= Roquebrune =

Roquebrune may refer to the following communes in France:

- Roquebrune, Gers, in the Gers département
- Roquebrune, Gironde, in the Gironde département
- Roquebrune, the former name for Roquebrune-Cap Martin, in the Alpes-Maritimes département
- Roquebrune-sur-Argens, in the Var département

== Other uses ==
- 13701 Roquebrune, an asteroid
