= Sendets =

Sendets may refer to two communes in the southwestern France:

- Sendets, Gironde
- Sendets, Pyrénées-Atlantiques
