= Cazalis =

Cazalis is the name of the following communes in France:

- Cazalis, Gironde, in the Gironde department
- Cazalis, Landes, in the Landes department

== People ==
- Henri Cazalis
