= Saint-Martin-du-Puy =

Saint-Martin-du-Puy is the name of the following communes in France:

- Saint-Martin-du-Puy, Gironde, in the Gironde department
- Saint-Martin-du-Puy, Nièvre, in the Nièvre department
