= Bagas, Gironde =

Bagas
- Commune
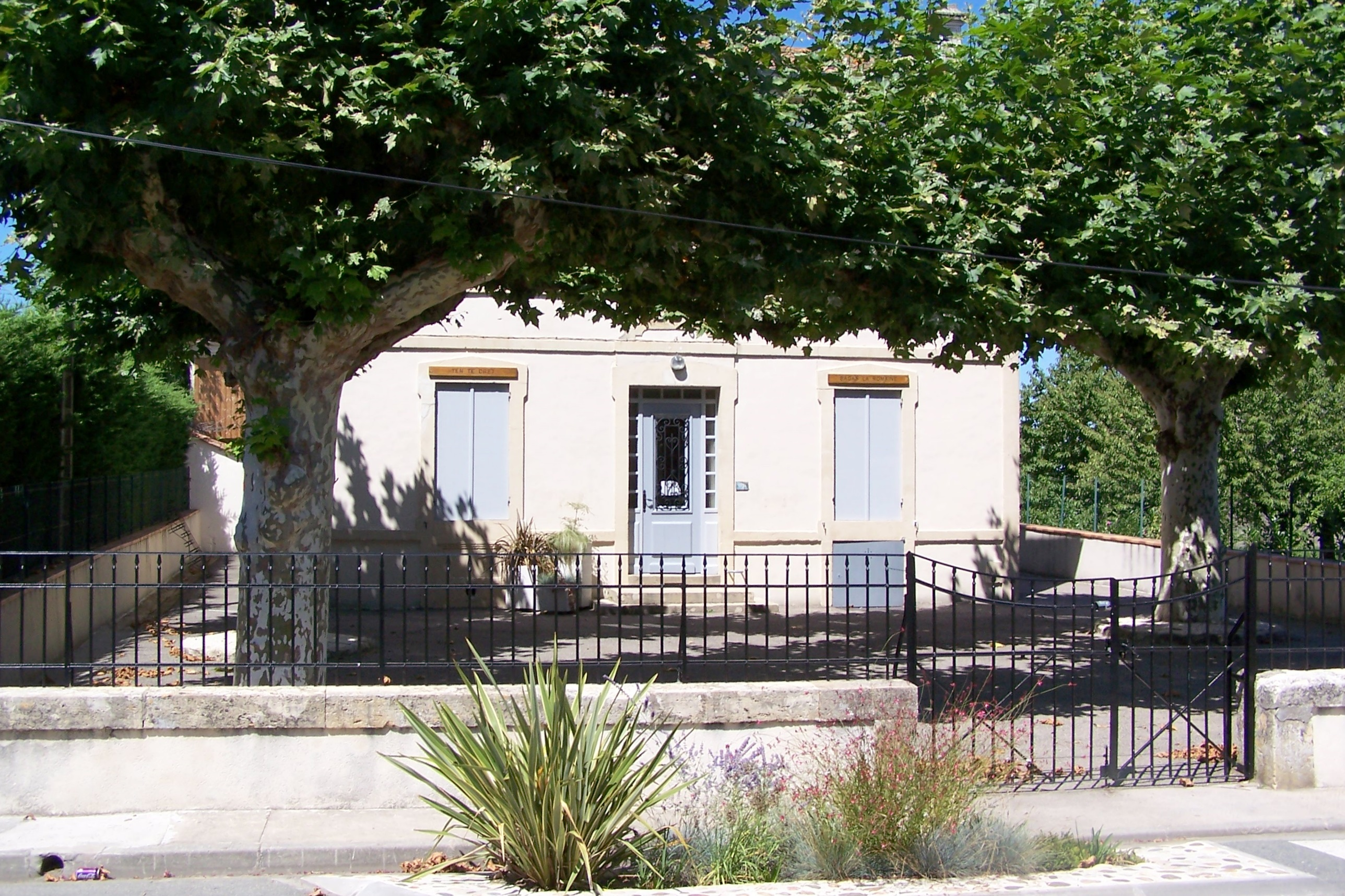
- Town hall
- Location of Bagas
- Location within France Location within Nouvelle-Aquitaine
- Coordinates: 44°37′33″N 0°03′16″W
- Country: France
- Region: Nouvelle-Aquitaine
- Department: Gironde
- Arrondissement: Langon
- Canton: Le Réolais et Les Bastides

Government
  - Mayor (2020–2026): Serge Issard
- Area^{1}: 3.63 km^{2} (1.40 sq mi)
- Elevation: 30 m (98 ft)
- Highest elevation: 86 m (282 ft)
- Lowest elevation: 11 m (36 ft)
- Population (2023): 283
  - Density: 78.0/km^{2} (202/sq mi)
- Time zone: UTC+01:00 (CET)
  - Summer (DST): UTC+02:00 (CEST)
- INSEE/Postal code: 33024 /33190
- ^{1} French Land Register data, which excludes lakes, ponds, glaciers > 1 km^{2} (0.386 sq mi or 247 acres) and river estuaries.

Bagas is a commune in the Gironde department in southwestern France.

== Population ==
Historical population
Year	Pop.	±% p.a.
1968	200	—
1975	197	−0.22%
1982	158	−3.10%
1990	144	−1.15%
1999	173	+2.06%
2007	224	+3.28%
2012	295	+5.66%
2017	295	+0.00%
2023	283	−0.69%
Source: INSEE

== See also ==
- Communes of the Gironde department
