= Sillas =

- Commune
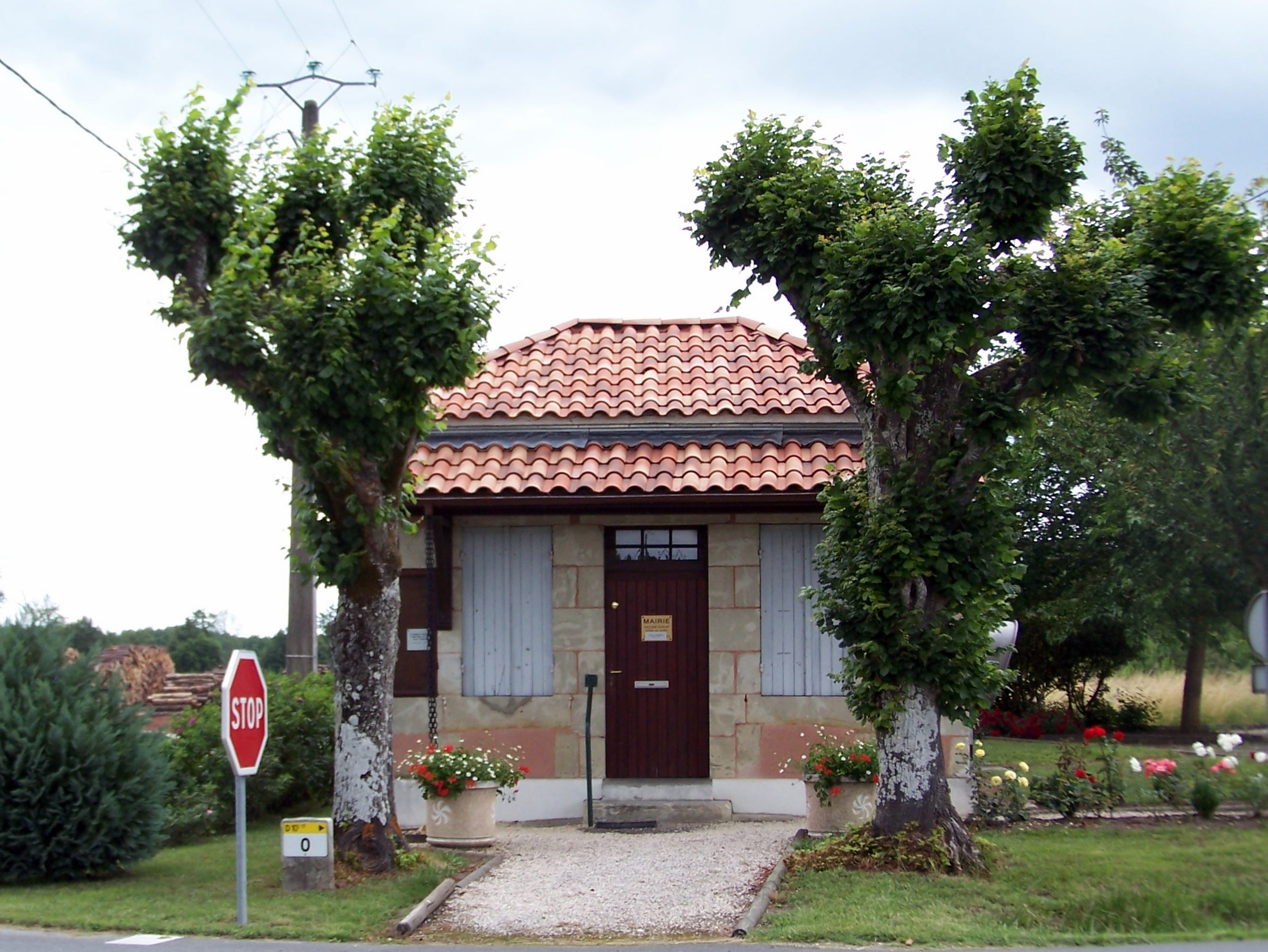
- Town hall
- Location of Sillas
- Location within France Location within Nouvelle-Aquitaine
- Coordinates: 44°22′30″N 0°03′36″W
- Country: France
- Region: Nouvelle-Aquitaine
- Department: Gironde
- Arrondissement: Langon
- Canton: Le Sud-Gironde
- Intercommunality: Bazadais

Government
  - Mayor (2020–2026): Michel Desqueyroux
- Area^{1}: 7.63 km^{2} (2.95 sq mi)
- Elevation: 125 m (410 ft)
- Highest elevation: 141 m (463 ft)
- Lowest elevation: 104 m (341 ft)
- Population (2023): 119
  - Density: 15.6/km^{2} (40.4/sq mi)
- Time zone: UTC+01:00 (CET)
  - Summer (DST): UTC+02:00 (CEST)
- INSEE/Postal code: 33513 /33690
- ^{1} French Land Register data, which excludes lakes, ponds, glaciers > 1 km^{2} (0.386 sq mi or 247 acres) and river estuaries.

Sillas (Occitan: Cadièras) is a commune in the Gironde department in Nouvelle-Aquitaine in southwestern France.

== Population ==
Historical population
Year	Pop.	±% p.a.
1968	129	—
1975	111	−2.12%
1982	100	−1.48%
1990	100	+0.00%
1999	105	+0.54%
2007	120	+1.68%
2012	106	−2.45%
2017	118	+2.17%
2023	119	+0.14%
Source: INSEE

== See also ==
- Communes of the Gironde department
