= Marimbault =

- Commune
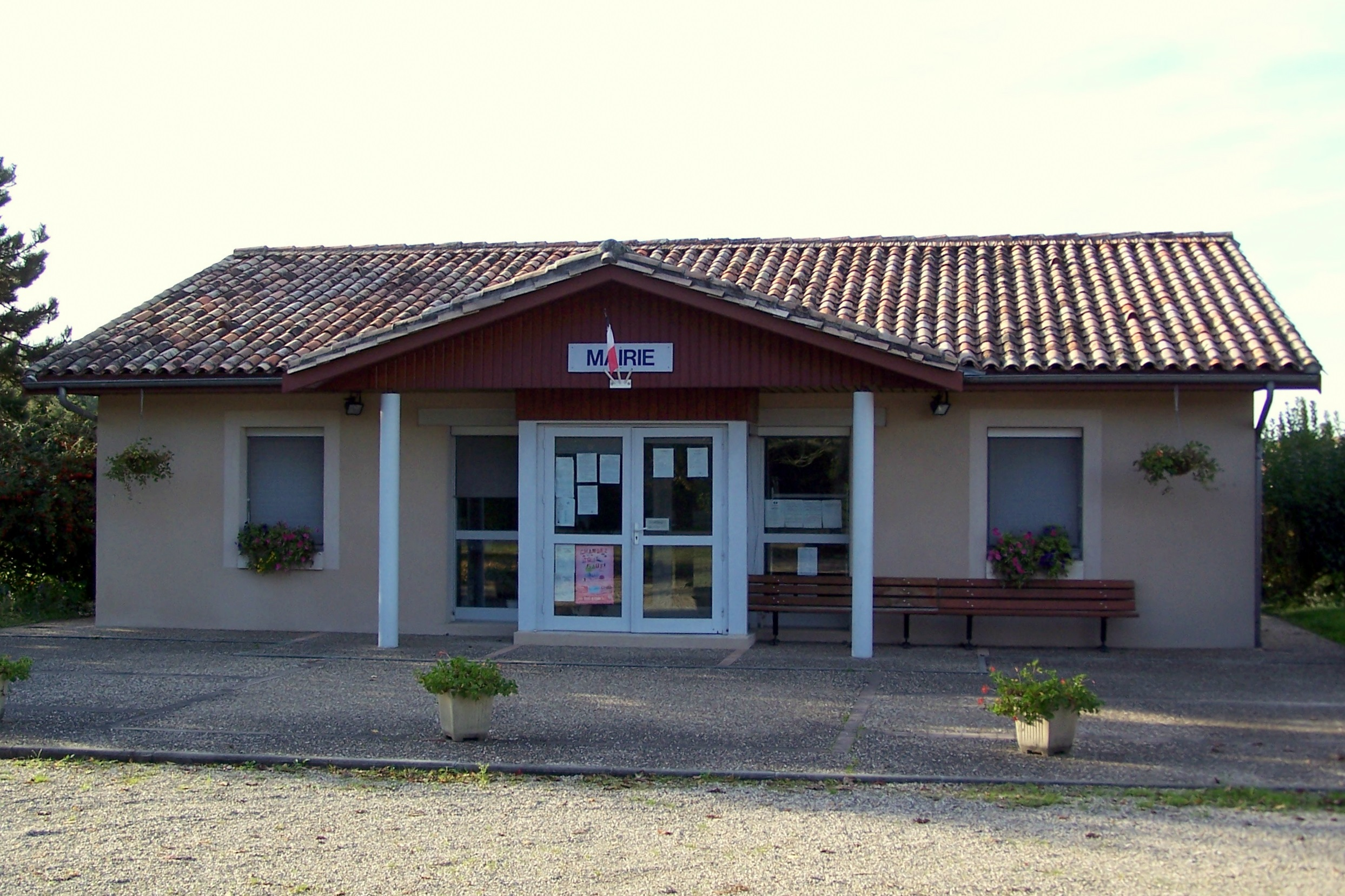
- Town hall
- Location of Marimbault
- Location within France Location within Nouvelle-Aquitaine
- Coordinates: 44°24′40″N 0°16′03″W
- Country: France
- Region: Nouvelle-Aquitaine
- Department: Gironde
- Arrondissement: Langon
- Canton: Le Sud-Gironde
- Intercommunality: Bazadais

Government
  - Mayor (2020–2026): Sébastien Tamagnan
- Area^{1}: 6.71 km^{2} (2.59 sq mi)
- Elevation: 113 m (371 ft)
- Highest elevation: 123 m (404 ft)
- Lowest elevation: 88 m (289 ft)
- Population (2023): 196
  - Density: 29.2/km^{2} (75.7/sq mi)
- Time zone: UTC+01:00 (CET)
  - Summer (DST): UTC+02:00 (CEST)
- INSEE/Postal code: 33270 /33430
- ^{1} French Land Register data, which excludes lakes, ponds, glaciers > 1 km^{2} (0.386 sq mi or 247 acres) and river estuaries.

Marimbault (French pronunciation: [maʁɛ̃bo]; Occitan: Masrimbaud) is a commune in the Gironde department in Nouvelle-Aquitaine in southwestern France.

== Population ==
Historical population
Year	Pop.	±% p.a.
1968	96	—
1975	68	−4.81%
1982	77	+1.79%
1990	83	+0.94%
1999	96	+1.63%
2007	142	+5.02%
2012	181	+4.97%
2017	186	+0.55%
2023	196	+0.88%
Source: INSEE

== See also ==
- Communes of the Gironde department
