= Bassanne =

- Commune
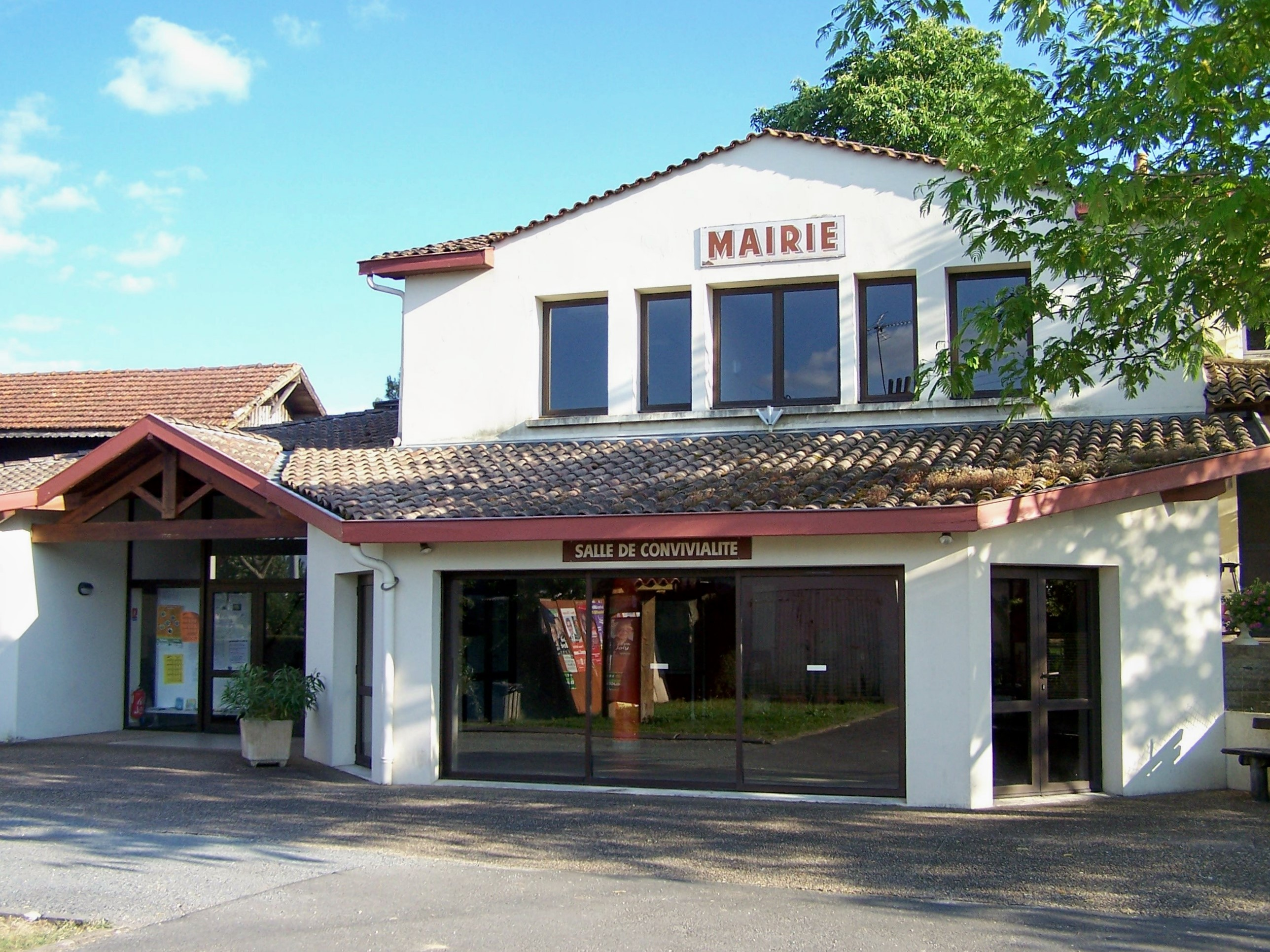
- Town hall
- Location of Bassanne
- Location within France Location within Nouvelle-Aquitaine
- Coordinates: 44°33′37″N 0°05′20″W
- Country: France
- Region: Nouvelle-Aquitaine
- Department: Gironde
- Arrondissement: Langon
- Canton: Le Réolais et Les Bastides

Government
  - Mayor (2020–2026): Richard Gauthier
- Area^{1}: 2.54 km^{2} (0.98 sq mi)
- Elevation: 12 m (39 ft)
- Highest elevation: 45 m (148 ft)
- Lowest elevation: 11 m (36 ft)
- Population (2023): 131
  - Density: 51.6/km^{2} (134/sq mi)
- Time zone: UTC+01:00 (CET)
  - Summer (DST): UTC+02:00 (CEST)
- INSEE/Postal code: 33031 /33190
- ^{1} French Land Register data, which excludes lakes, ponds, glaciers > 1 km^{2} (0.386 sq mi or 247 acres) and river estuaries.

Bassanne (French pronunciation: [basan]; Occitan: Bassana) is a commune in the Gironde department in southwestern France.

== Population ==
Historical population
Year	Pop.	±% p.a.
1968	113	—
1975	104	−1.18%
1982	104	+0.00%
1990	92	−1.52%
1999	87	−0.62%
2007	82	−0.74%
2012	95	+2.99%
2017	120	+4.78%
2023	131	+1.47%
Source: INSEE

== See also ==
- Communes of the Gironde department
