= Saint-Michel-de-Lapujade =

- Commune
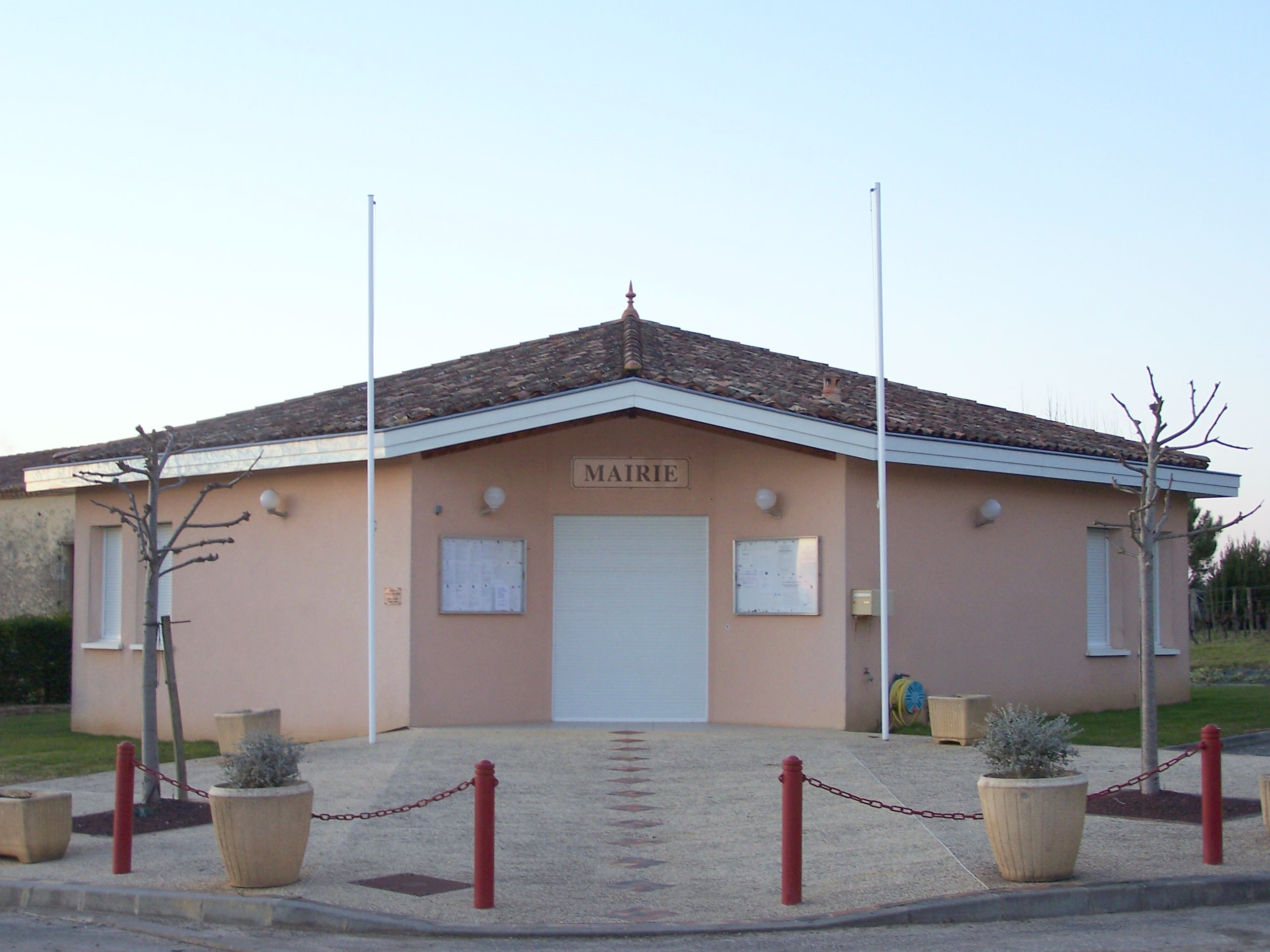
- Town hall
- Location of Saint-Michel-de-Lapujade
- Location within France Location within Nouvelle-Aquitaine
- Coordinates: 44°34′57″N 0°04′17″E
- Country: France
- Region: Nouvelle-Aquitaine
- Department: Gironde
- Arrondissement: Langon
- Canton: Le Réolais et Les Bastides
- Intercommunality: Réolais en Sud Gironde

Government
  - Mayor (2020–2026): Christian Malandit-Sallaud
- Area^{1}: 7.47 km^{2} (2.88 sq mi)
- Elevation: 85 m (279 ft)
- Highest elevation: 122 m (400 ft)
- Lowest elevation: 24 m (79 ft)
- Population (2023): 211
  - Density: 28.2/km^{2} (73.2/sq mi)
- Time zone: UTC+01:00 (CET)
  - Summer (DST): UTC+02:00 (CEST)
- INSEE/Postal code: 33453 /33190
- ^{1} French Land Register data, which excludes lakes, ponds, glaciers > 1 km^{2} (0.386 sq mi or 247 acres) and river estuaries.

Saint-Michel-de-Lapujade (French pronunciation: [sɛ̃ miʃɛl də lapyʒad]; Occitan: Sent Miquèu de la Pujada) is a commune in the Gironde department in Nouvelle-Aquitaine in southwestern France.

== Population ==
Historical population
Year	Pop.	±% p.a.
1968	217	—
1975	209	−0.54%
1982	221	+0.80%
1990	222	+0.06%
1999	221	−0.05%
2007	201	−1.18%
2012	191	−1.02%
2017	233	+4.06%
2023	211	−1.64%
Source: INSEE

== See also ==
- Communes of the Gironde department
