= Cleyrac =

- Commune
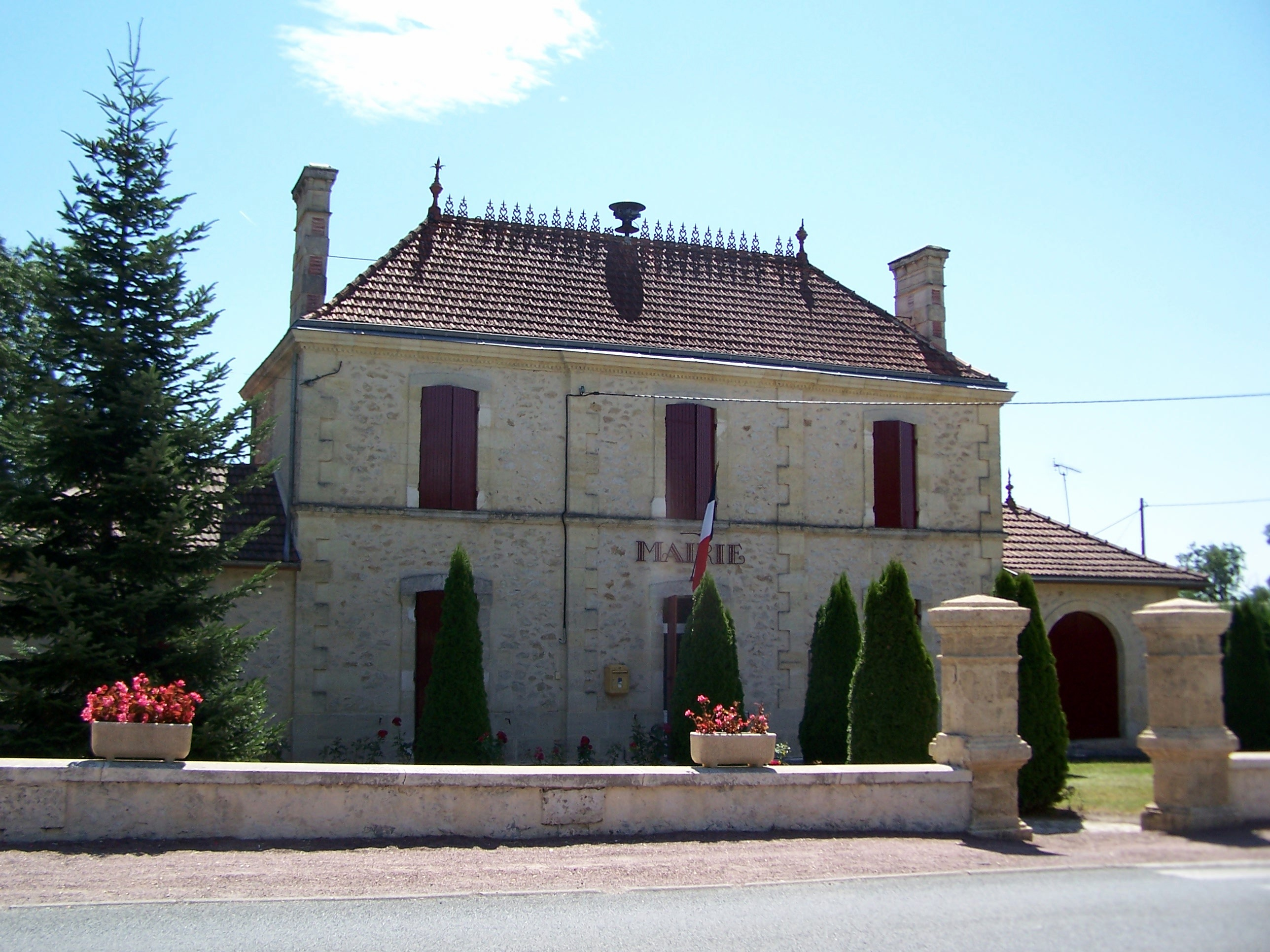
- Town hall

- Coat of arms
- Location of Cleyrac
- Location within France Location within Nouvelle-Aquitaine
- Coordinates: 44°43′13″N 0°02′14″W
- Country: France
- Region: Nouvelle-Aquitaine
- Department: Gironde
- Arrondissement: Langon
- Canton: Le Réolais et Les Bastides

Government
  - Mayor (2020–2026): Philippe Curoy
- Area^{1}: 6.07 km^{2} (2.34 sq mi)
- Elevation: 55 m (180 ft)
- Highest elevation: 106 m (348 ft)
- Lowest elevation: 53 m (174 ft)
- Population (2023): 148
  - Density: 24.4/km^{2} (63.1/sq mi)
- Time zone: UTC+01:00 (CET)
  - Summer (DST): UTC+02:00 (CEST)
- INSEE/Postal code: 33129 /33540
- ^{1} French Land Register data, which excludes lakes, ponds, glaciers > 1 km^{2} (0.386 sq mi or 247 acres) and river estuaries.

Cleyrac (French pronunciation: [klɛʁak]; Occitan: Clairac) is a commune in the Gironde department in Nouvelle-Aquitaine in southwestern France.

== Population ==
Historical population
Year	Pop.	±% p.a.
1968	156	—
1975	142	−1.33%
1982	124	−1.92%
1990	143	+1.80%
1999	149	+0.46%
2007	141	−0.69%
2012	154	+1.78%
2017	160	+0.77%
2023	148	−1.29%
Source: INSEE

== See also ==
- Communes of the Gironde department
