= Auriolles =

- Commune
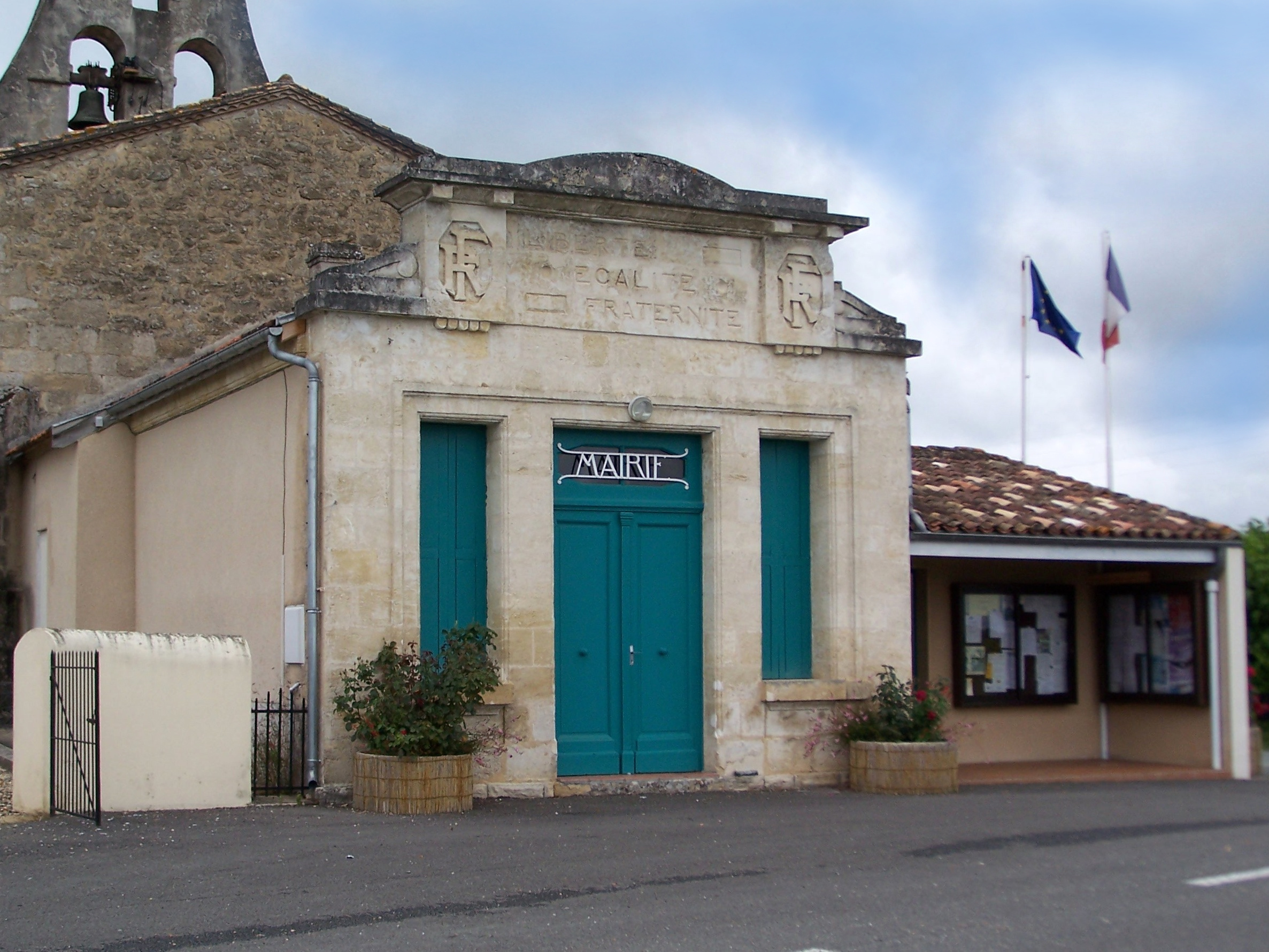
- Town hall
- Location of Auriolles
- Location within France Location within Nouvelle-Aquitaine
- Coordinates: 44°44′33″N 0°03′02″E
- Country: France
- Region: Nouvelle-Aquitaine
- Department: Gironde
- Arrondissement: Langon
- Canton: Le Réolais et Les Bastides
- Intercommunality: CC Pays Foyen

Government
  - Mayor (2020–2026): Marie-José Guyot
- Area^{1}: 7.03 km^{2} (2.71 sq mi)
- Elevation: 96 m (315 ft)
- Highest elevation: 116 m (381 ft)
- Lowest elevation: 41 m (135 ft)
- Population (2023): 136
  - Density: 19.3/km^{2} (50.1/sq mi)
- Time zone: UTC+01:00 (CET)
  - Summer (DST): UTC+02:00 (CEST)
- INSEE/Postal code: 33020 /33790
- ^{1} French Land Register data, which excludes lakes, ponds, glaciers > 1 km^{2} (0.386 sq mi or 247 acres) and river estuaries.

Auriolles (French pronunciation: [oʁjɔl]; Occitan: Auriòlas) is a commune in the Gironde department in southwestern France.

== Population ==
Historical population
Year	Pop.	±% p.a.
1968	179	—
1975	122	−5.33%
1982	110	−1.47%
1990	112	+0.23%
1999	117	+0.49%
2007	130	+1.33%
2012	124	−0.94%
2017	140	+2.46%
2023	136	−0.48%
Source: INSEE

== See also ==
- Communes of the Gironde department
