= Pondaurat =

- Commune
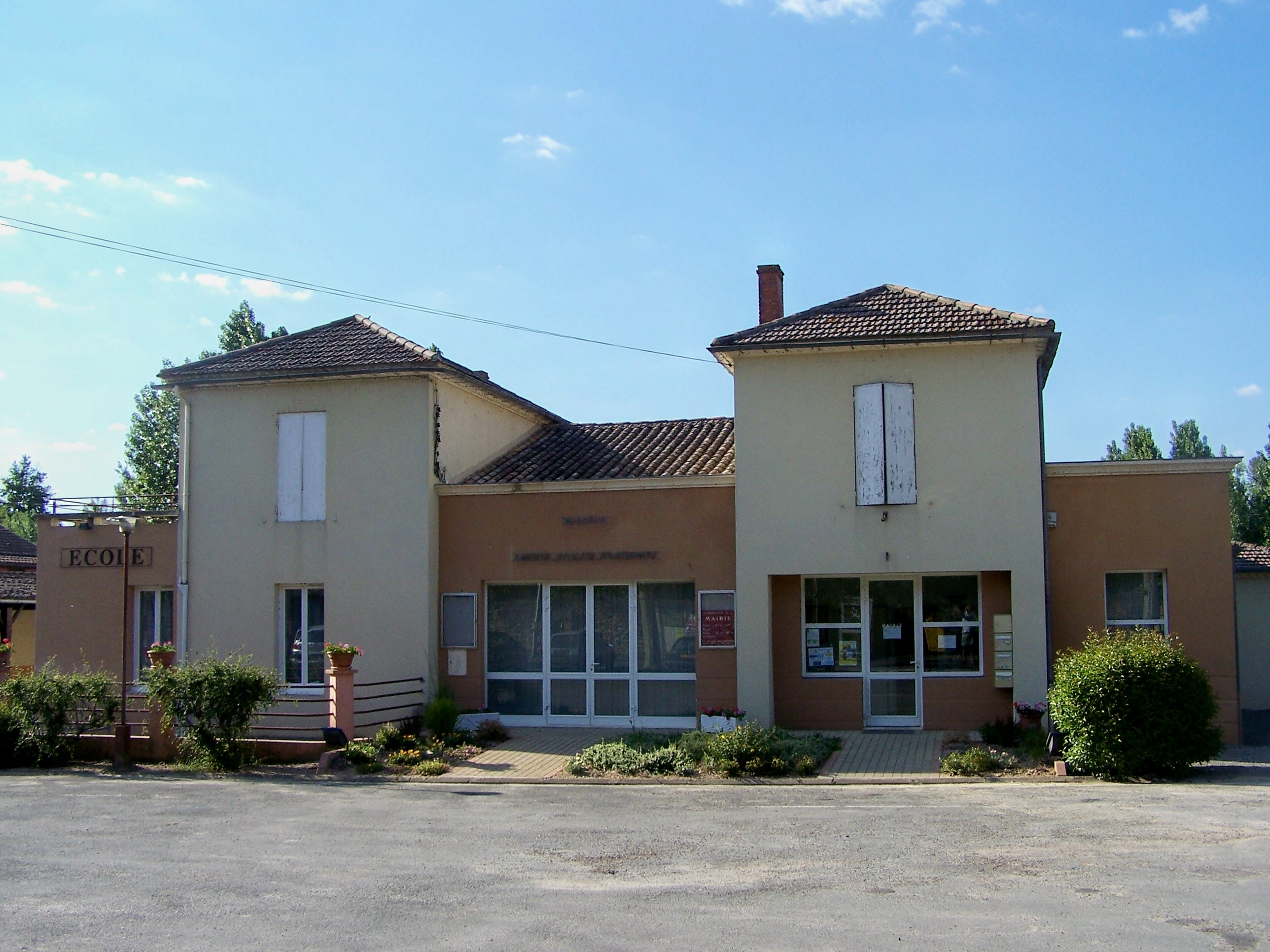
- Town hall

- Coat of arms
- Location of Pondaurat
- Location within France Location within Nouvelle-Aquitaine
- Coordinates: 44°32′15″N 0°05′13″W
- Country: France
- Region: Nouvelle-Aquitaine
- Department: Gironde
- Arrondissement: Langon
- Canton: Le Réolais et Les Bastides

Government
  - Mayor (2020–2026): Francis Zaghet
- Area^{1}: 8.74 km^{2} (3.37 sq mi)
- Highest elevation: 67 m (220 ft)
- Lowest elevation: 11 m (36 ft)
- Population (2023): 455
  - Density: 52.1/km^{2} (135/sq mi)
- Time zone: UTC+01:00 (CET)
  - Summer (DST): UTC+02:00 (CEST)
- INSEE/Postal code: 33331 /33190
- ^{1} French Land Register data, which excludes lakes, ponds, glaciers > 1 km^{2} (0.386 sq mi or 247 acres) and river estuaries.

Pondaurat (French pronunciation: [pɔ̃doʁa]) is a commune in the Gironde department in Nouvelle-Aquitaine in southwestern France.

== Population ==
Historical population
| Year | Pop. | ±% p.a. |
|---|---|---|
| 1968 | 465 | — |
| 1975 | 380 | −2.84% |
| 1982 | 361 | −0.73% |
| 1990 | 361 | +0.00% |
| 1999 | 355 | −0.19% |
| 2007 | 372 | +0.59% |
| 2012 | 479 | +5.19% |
| 2017 | 470 | −0.38% |
| 2023 | 455 | −0.54% |
Source: INSEE

== See also ==
- Communes of the Gironde department
