= Blasimon =

- Commune
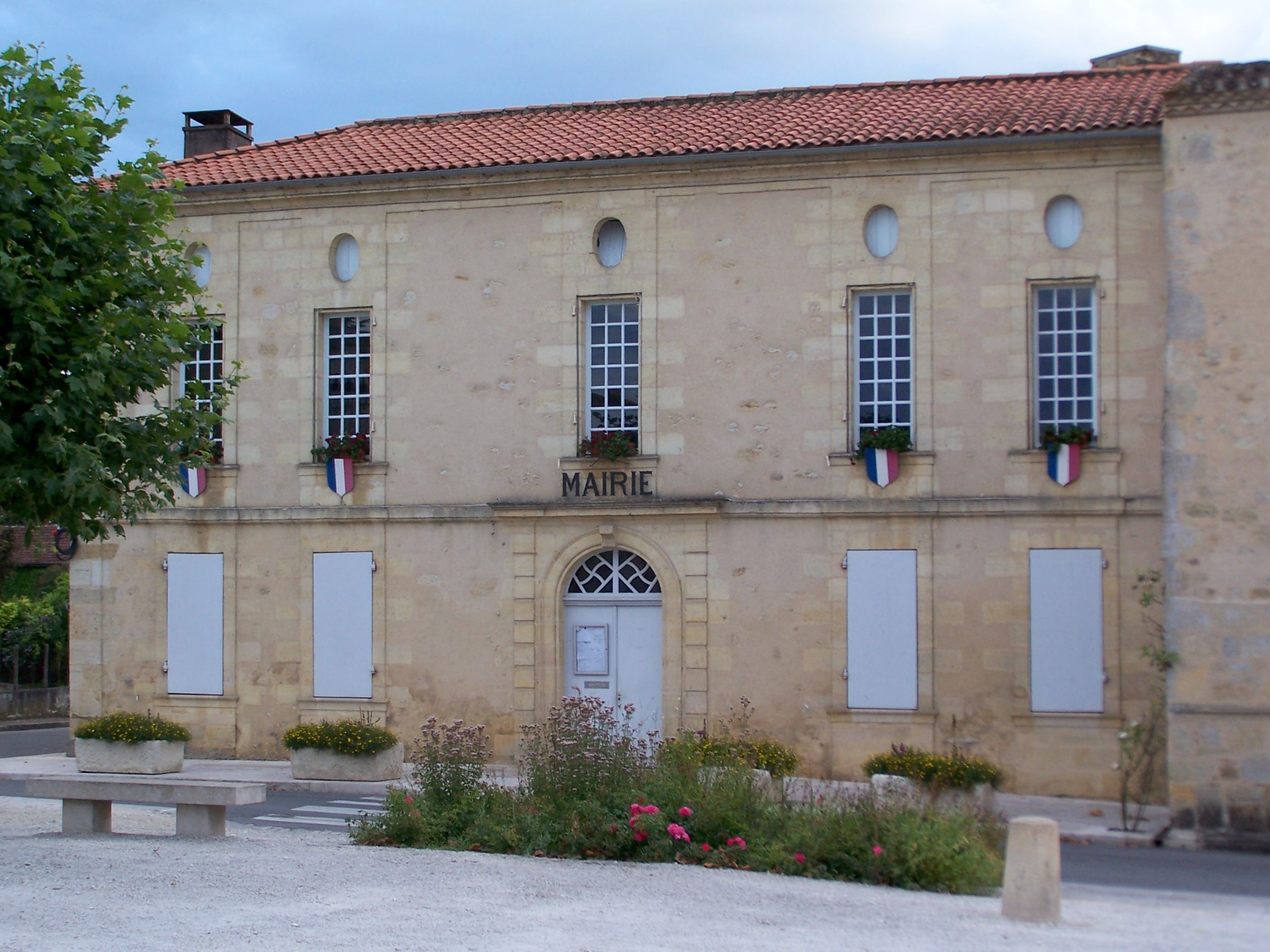
- Town hall

- Coat of arms
- Location of Blasimon
- Location within France Location within Nouvelle-Aquitaine
- Coordinates: 44°44′59″N 0°04′23″W
- Country: France
- Region: Nouvelle-Aquitaine
- Department: Gironde
- Arrondissement: Langon
- Canton: Le Réolais et Les Bastides

Government
  - Mayor (2020–2026): Daniel Barbe
- Area^{1}: 29.76 km^{2} (11.49 sq mi)
- Elevation: 70 m (230 ft)
- Highest elevation: 130 m (430 ft)
- Lowest elevation: 22 m (72 ft)
- Population (2023): 959
  - Density: 32.2/km^{2} (83.5/sq mi)
- Time zone: UTC+01:00 (CET)
  - Summer (DST): UTC+02:00 (CEST)
- INSEE/Postal code: 33057 /33540
- ^{1} French Land Register data, which excludes lakes, ponds, glaciers > 1 km^{2} (0.386 sq mi or 247 acres) and river estuaries.

Blasimon (French pronunciation: [blazimɔ̃]; Occitan: Blasimont) is a commune in the Gironde department in Nouvelle-Aquitaine in southwestern France.

== Population ==
Historical population
Year	Pop.	±% p.a.
1968	836	—
1975	782	−0.95%
1982	666	−2.27%
1990	701	+0.64%
1999	711	+0.16%
2007	861	+2.42%
2012	896	+0.80%
2017	906	+0.22%
2023	959	+0.95%
Source: INSEE

== See also ==
- Communes of the Gironde department
