= Mongauzy =

- Commune
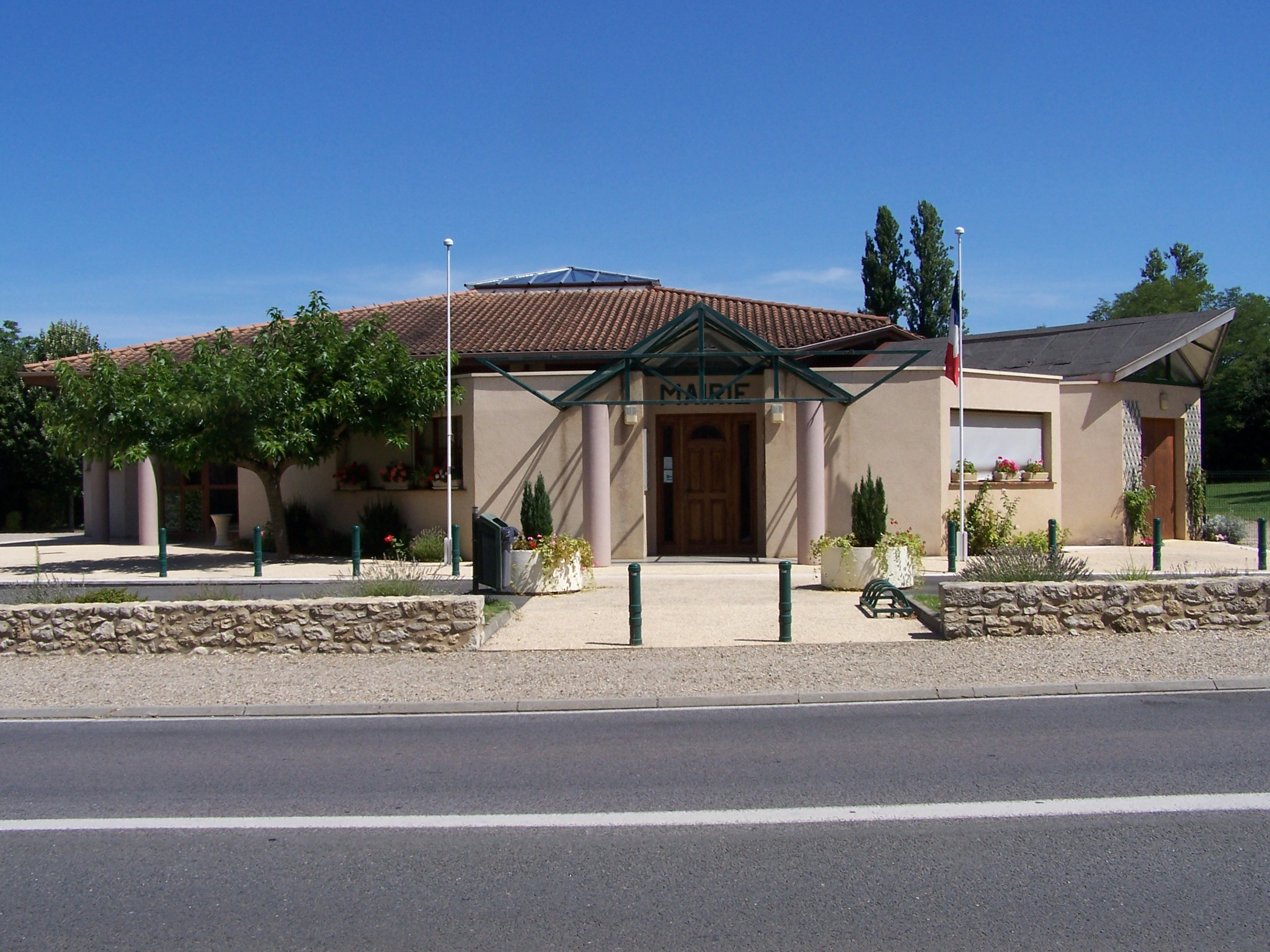
- Town hall
- Location of Mongauzy
- Location within France Location within Nouvelle-Aquitaine
- Coordinates: 44°34′05″N 0°02′05″E
- Country: France
- Region: Nouvelle-Aquitaine
- Department: Gironde
- Arrondissement: Langon
- Canton: Le Réolais et Les Bastides

Government
  - Mayor (2020–2026): Clara Delas
- Area^{1}: 6.84 km^{2} (2.64 sq mi)
- Elevation: 26 m (85 ft)
- Highest elevation: 110 m (360 ft)
- Lowest elevation: 13 m (43 ft)
- Population (2023): 667
  - Density: 97.5/km^{2} (253/sq mi)
- Time zone: UTC+01:00 (CET)
  - Summer (DST): UTC+02:00 (CEST)
- INSEE/Postal code: 33287 /33190
- ^{1} French Land Register data, which excludes lakes, ponds, glaciers > 1 km^{2} (0.386 sq mi or 247 acres) and river estuaries.

Mongauzy (French pronunciation: [mɔ̃ɡozi]; Occitan: Montgausí) is a commune in the Gironde department in Nouvelle-Aquitaine in southwestern France.

== Population ==
Historical population
Year	Pop.	±% p.a.
1968	555	—
1975	538	−0.44%
1982	537	−0.03%
1990	531	−0.14%
1999	568	+0.75%
2007	580	+0.26%
2012	604	+0.81%
2017	595	−0.30%
2023	667	+1.92%
Source: INSEE

== See also ==
- Communes of the Gironde department
