= Lartigue, Gironde =

Lartigue
- Commune
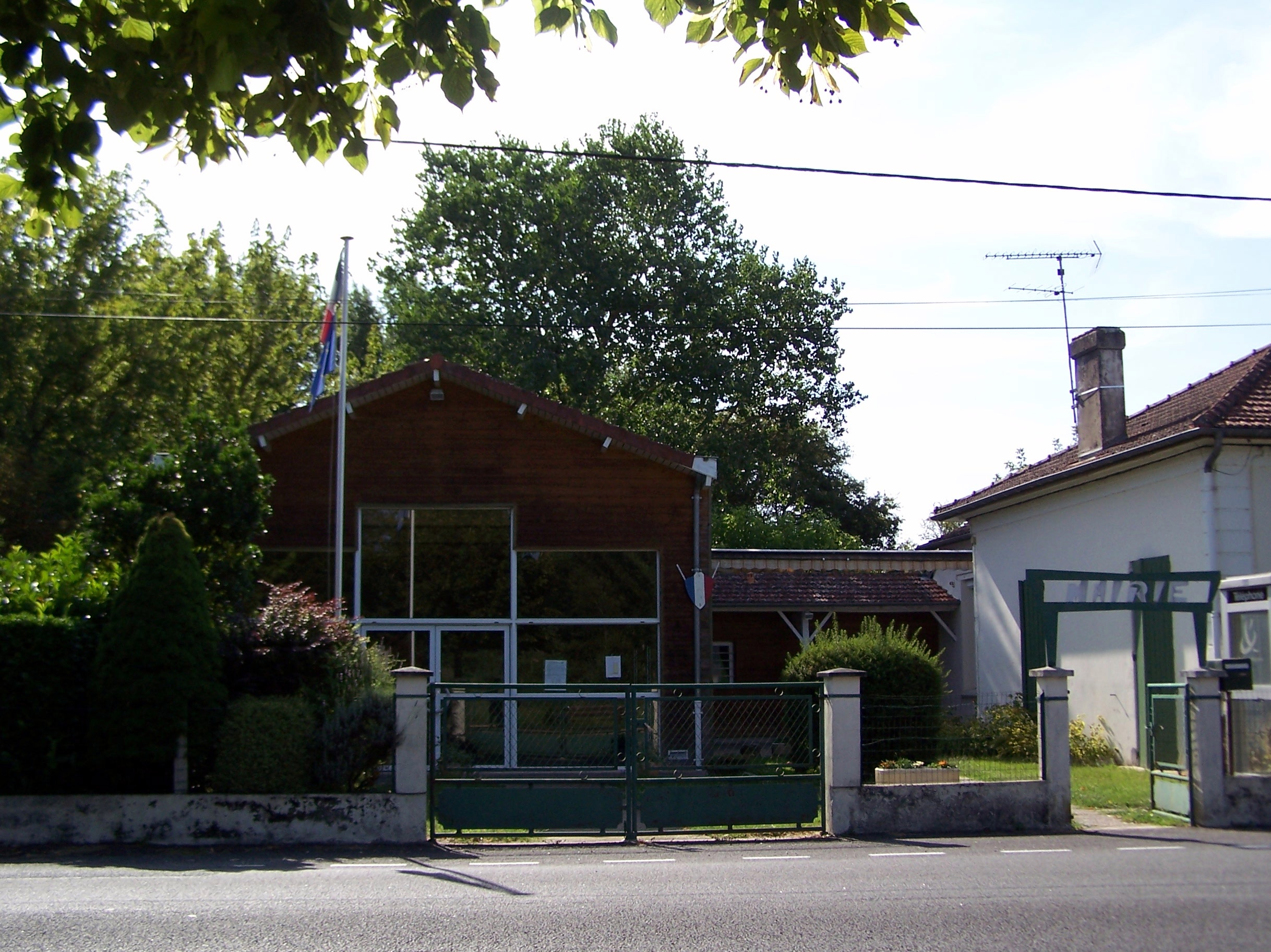
- Town hall
- Location of Lartigue
- Location within France Location within Nouvelle-Aquitaine
- Coordinates: 44°15′07″N 0°05′44″W
- Country: France
- Region: Nouvelle-Aquitaine
- Department: Gironde
- Arrondissement: Langon
- Canton: Le Sud-Gironde
- Intercommunality: Bazadais

Government
  - Mayor (2020–2026): Philippe Lamothe
- Area^{1}: 13.64 km^{2} (5.27 sq mi)
- Elevation: 119 m (390 ft)
- Highest elevation: 127 m (417 ft)
- Lowest elevation: 91 m (299 ft)
- Population (2023): 41
  - Density: 3.0/km^{2} (7.8/sq mi)
- Time zone: UTC+01:00 (CET)
  - Summer (DST): UTC+02:00 (CEST)
- INSEE/Postal code: 33232 /33840
- ^{1} French Land Register data, which excludes lakes, ponds, glaciers > 1 km^{2} (0.386 sq mi or 247 acres) and river estuaries.

Lartigue (French pronunciation: [laʁtiɡ]; Occitan: L'Artiga) is a commune in the Gironde department in Nouvelle-Aquitaine in southwestern France.

== Population ==
Lartigue has the smallest population of any commune in the department.

Historical population
Year	Pop.	±% p.a.
1968	93	—
1975	67	−4.58%
1982	61	−1.33%
1990	40	−5.14%
1999	41	+0.27%
2007	55	+3.74%
2012	47	−3.09%
2017	40	−3.17%
2023	41	+0.41%
Source: INSEE

== See also ==
- Communes of the Gironde department
