= Saint-Pierre-de-Mons =

- Commune
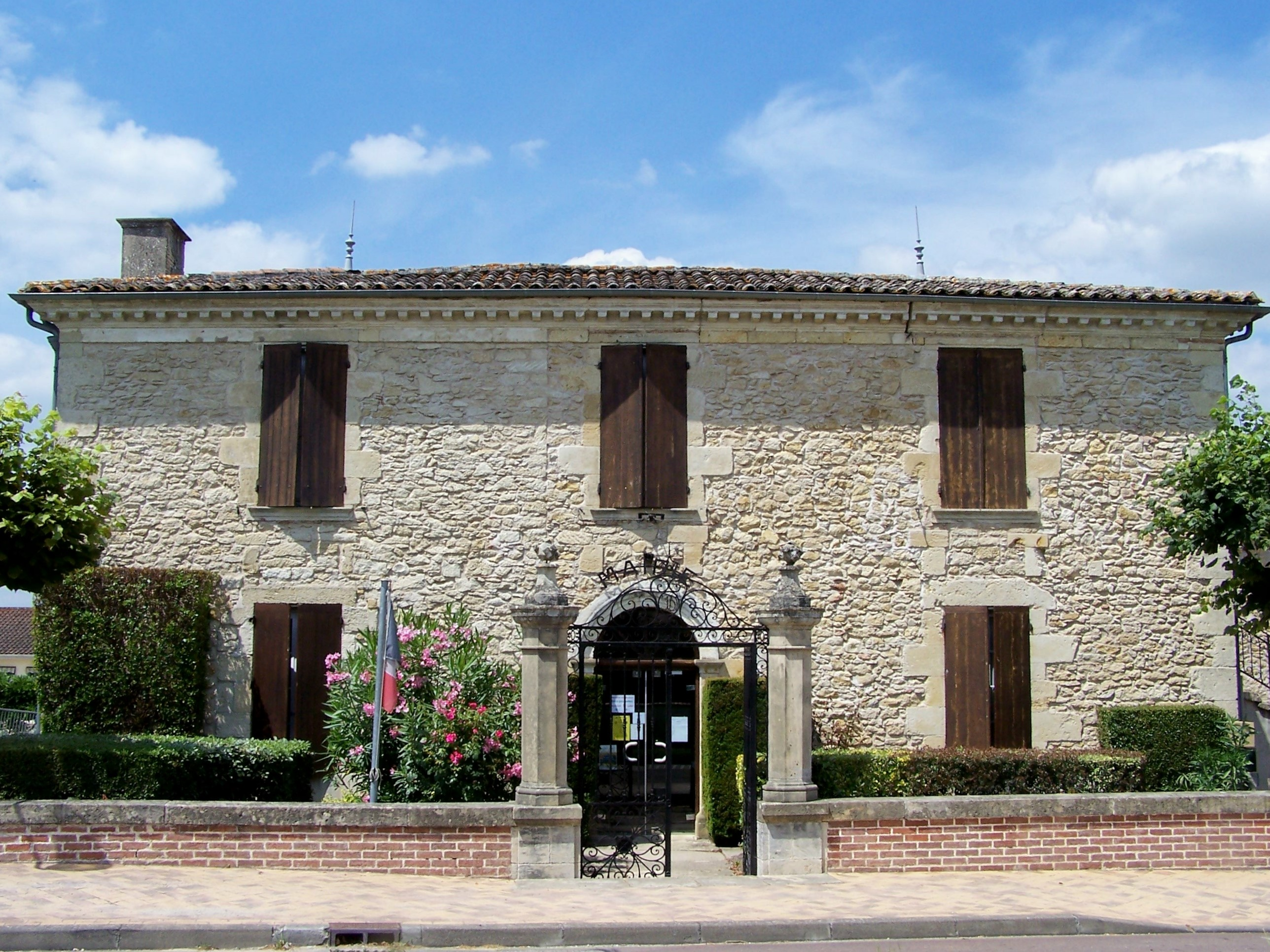
- Town hall
- Location of Saint-Pierre-de-Mons
- Location within France Location within Nouvelle-Aquitaine
- Coordinates: 44°33′10″N 0°13′10″W
- Country: France
- Region: Nouvelle-Aquitaine
- Department: Gironde
- Arrondissement: Langon
- Canton: Le Sud-Gironde

Government
  - Mayor (2020–2026): Patrick Labayle
- Area^{1}: 9.27 km^{2} (3.58 sq mi)
- Elevation: 34 m (112 ft)
- Highest elevation: 55 m (180 ft)
- Lowest elevation: 2 m (6.6 ft)
- Population (2023): 1,240
  - Density: 134/km^{2} (346/sq mi)
- Time zone: UTC+01:00 (CET)
  - Summer (DST): UTC+02:00 (CEST)
- INSEE/Postal code: 33465 /33210
- ^{1} French Land Register data, which excludes lakes, ponds, glaciers > 1 km^{2} (0.386 sq mi or 247 acres) and river estuaries.

Saint-Pierre-de-Mons is a commune in the Gironde department in Nouvelle-Aquitaine in southwestern France.

== Population ==
Historical population
Year	Pop.	±% p.a.
1968	636	—
1975	585	−1.19%
1982	712	+2.85%
1990	799	+1.45%
1999	813	+0.19%
2007	1,032	+3.03%
2012	1,093	+1.16%
2017	1,198	+1.85%
2023	1,240	+0.58%
Source: INSEE

== See also ==
- Communes of the Gironde department
