= Saint-Hilaire-de-la-Noaille =

- Commune
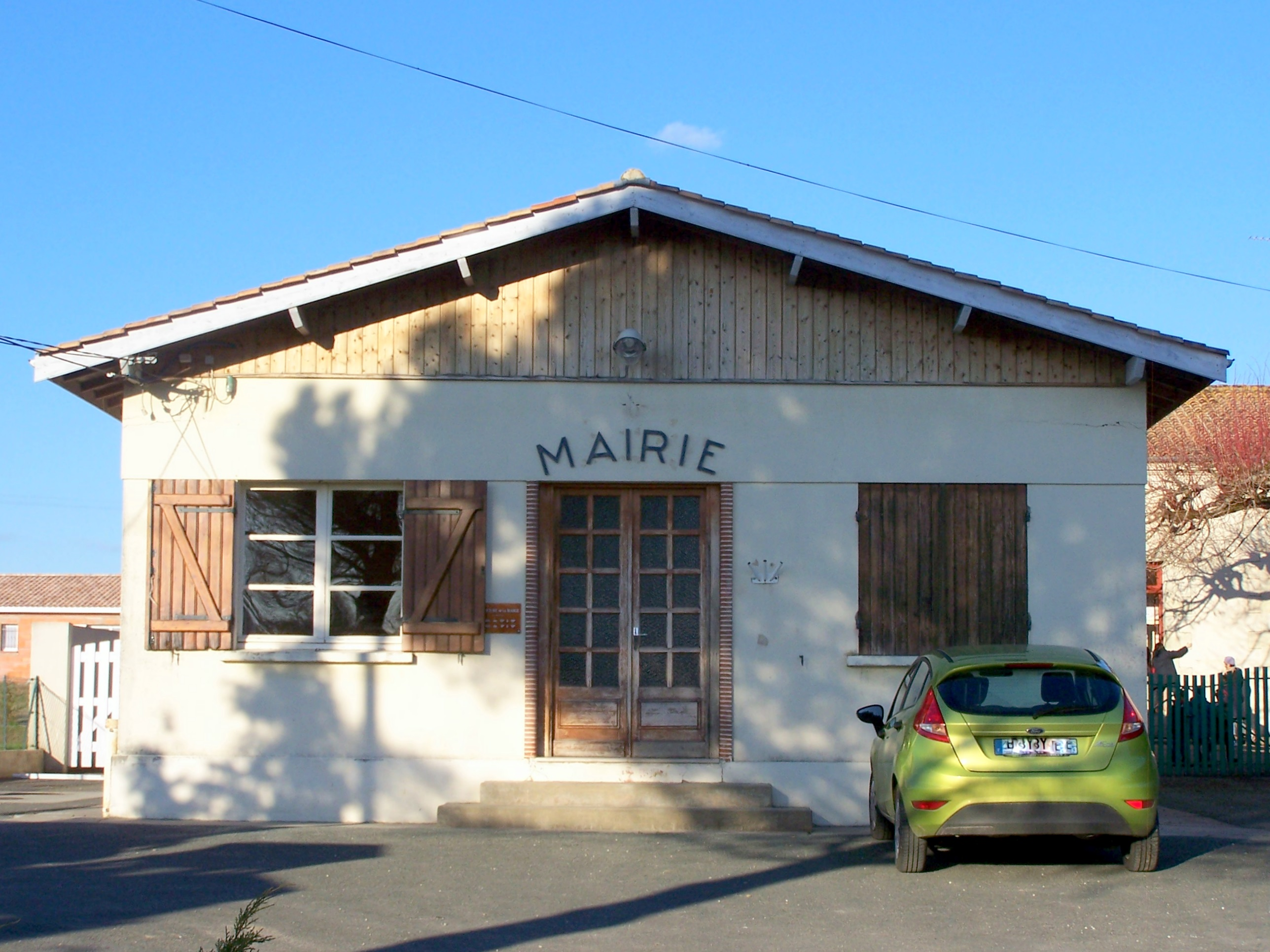
- The town hall in Saint-Hilaire-de-la-Noaille
- Location of Saint-Hilaire-de-la-Noaille
- Location within France Location within Nouvelle-Aquitaine
- Coordinates: 44°36′07″N 0°00′09″E
- Country: France
- Region: Nouvelle-Aquitaine
- Department: Gironde
- Arrondissement: Langon
- Canton: Le Réolais et Les Bastides
- Intercommunality: Réolais en Sud Gironde

Government
  - Mayor (2020–2026): Didier Lecourt
- Area^{1}: 11.45 km^{2} (4.42 sq mi)
- Highest elevation: 130 m (430 ft)
- Lowest elevation: 39 m (128 ft)
- Population (2023): 382
  - Density: 33.4/km^{2} (86.4/sq mi)
- Time zone: UTC+01:00 (CET)
  - Summer (DST): UTC+02:00 (CEST)
- INSEE/Postal code: 33418 /33190
- ^{1} French Land Register data, which excludes lakes, ponds, glaciers > 1 km^{2} (0.386 sq mi or 247 acres) and river estuaries.

Saint-Hilaire-de-la-Noaille (French pronunciation: [sɛ̃.t‿ilɛʁ də lanɔaj]; Gascon: Sent Ilari de la Noalha) is a commune in the Gironde department in Nouvelle-Aquitaine in southwestern France.

== Population ==
Historical population
Year	Pop.	±% p.a.
1968	316	—
1975	296	−0.93%
1982	271	−1.25%
1990	291	+0.89%
1999	305	+0.52%
2007	362	+2.16%
2012	374	+0.65%
2017	381	+0.37%
2023	382	+0.04%
Source: INSEE

== See also ==
- Communes of the Gironde department
