= Sainte-Gemme, Gironde =

Sainte-Gemme
- Commune
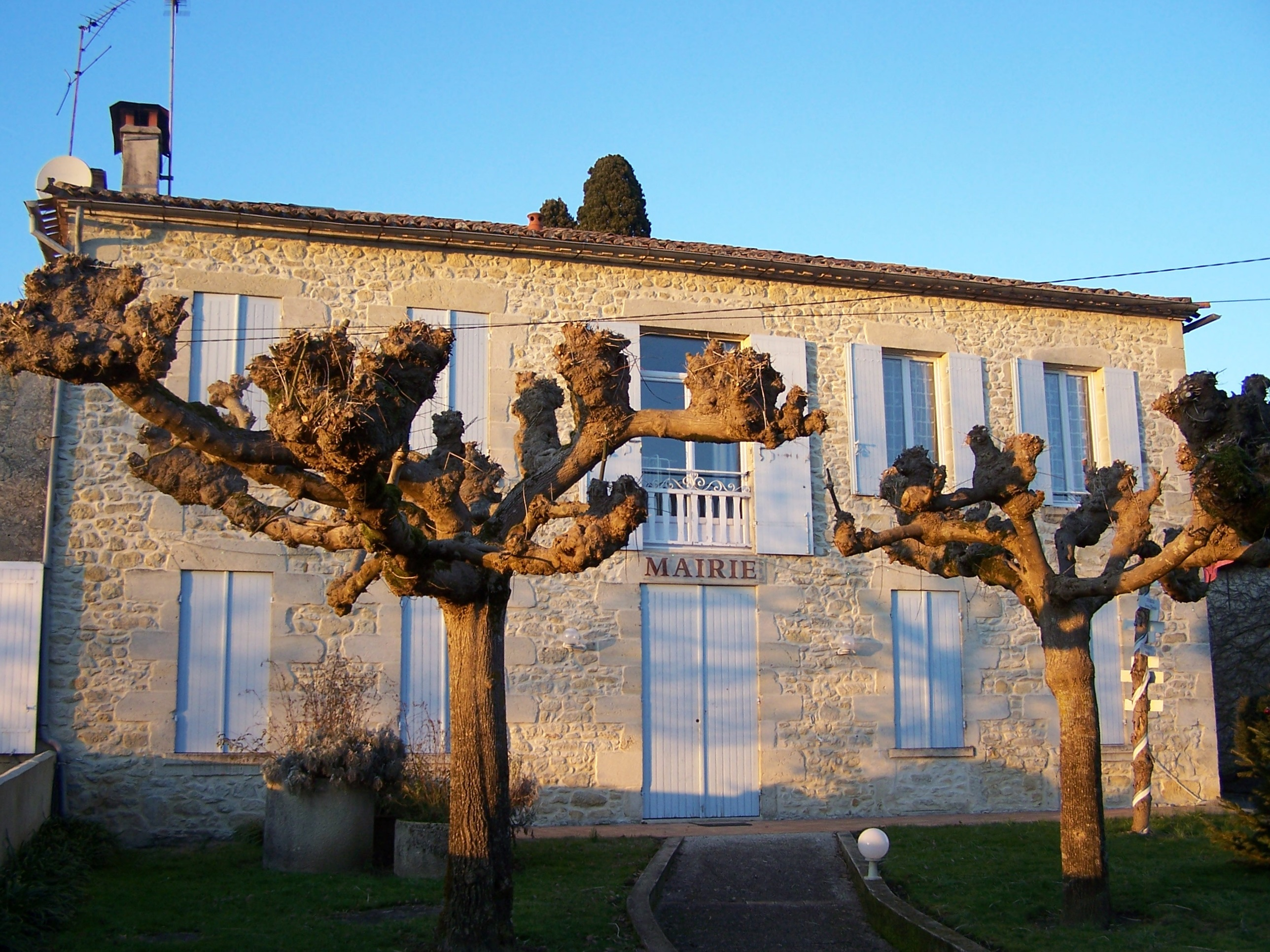
- Town hall
- Location of Sainte-Gemme
- Location within France Location within Nouvelle-Aquitaine
- Coordinates: 44°37′16″N 0°04′14″E
- Country: France
- Region: Nouvelle-Aquitaine
- Department: Gironde
- Arrondissement: Langon
- Canton: Le Réolais et Les Bastides

Government
  - Mayor (2025–2026): Marie Bardin
- Area^{1}: 9.55 km^{2} (3.69 sq mi)
- Elevation: 84 m (276 ft)
- Highest elevation: 116 m (381 ft)
- Lowest elevation: 30 m (98 ft)
- Population (2023): 192
  - Density: 20.1/km^{2} (52.1/sq mi)
- Time zone: UTC+01:00 (CET)
  - Summer (DST): UTC+02:00 (CEST)
- INSEE/Postal code: 33404 /33580
- ^{1} French Land Register data, which excludes lakes, ponds, glaciers > 1 km^{2} (0.386 sq mi or 247 acres) and river estuaries.

Sainte-Gemme (French pronunciation: [sɛ̃t ʒɛm]; Occitan: Senta Gema) is a commune in the Gironde department in Nouvelle-Aquitaine in southwestern France.

== Population ==
Historical population
Year	Pop.	±% p.a.
1968	265	—
1975	206	−3.53%
1982	208	+0.14%
1990	189	−1.19%
1999	187	−0.12%
2007	221	+2.11%
2012	257	+3.06%
2017	186	−6.26%
2023	192	+0.53%
Source: INSEE

== See also ==
- Communes of the Gironde department
