= Savignac, Gironde =

Savignac
- Commune
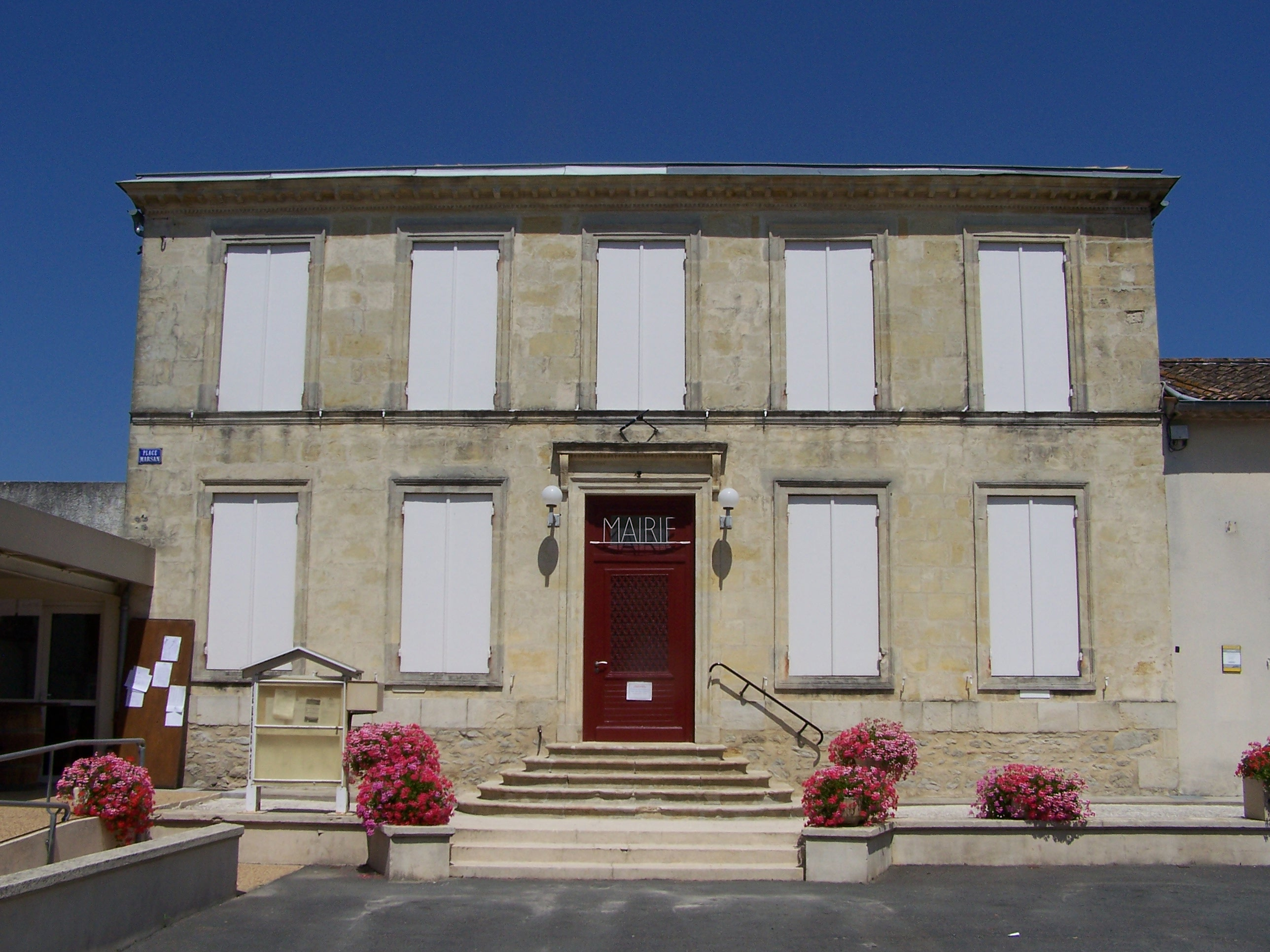
- The town hall in Savignac
- Location of Savignac
- Location within France Location within Nouvelle-Aquitaine
- Coordinates: 44°31′25″N 0°06′28″W
- Country: France
- Region: Nouvelle-Aquitaine
- Department: Gironde
- Arrondissement: Langon
- Canton: Le Réolais et Les Bastides

Government
  - Mayor (2020–2026): Patrick Monto
- Area^{1}: 17.02 km^{2} (6.57 sq mi)
- Highest elevation: 106 m (348 ft)
- Lowest elevation: 27 m (89 ft)
- Population (2023): 637
  - Density: 37.4/km^{2} (96.9/sq mi)
- Time zone: UTC+01:00 (CET)
  - Summer (DST): UTC+02:00 (CEST)
- INSEE/Postal code: 33508 /33124
- ^{1} French Land Register data, which excludes lakes, ponds, glaciers > 1 km^{2} (0.386 sq mi or 247 acres) and river estuaries.

Savignac (French pronunciation: [saviɲak]; Occitan: Savinhac) is a commune in the Gironde department in Nouvelle-Aquitaine in southwestern France.

== Population ==
Historical population
Year	Pop.	±% p.a.
1968	586	—
1975	445	−3.86%
1982	437	−0.26%
1990	464	+0.75%
1999	493	+0.68%
2007	528	+0.86%
2012	612	+3.00%
2017	633	+0.68%
2023	637	+0.11%
Source: INSEE

== See also ==
- Communes of the Gironde department
