= Brannens =

- Commune
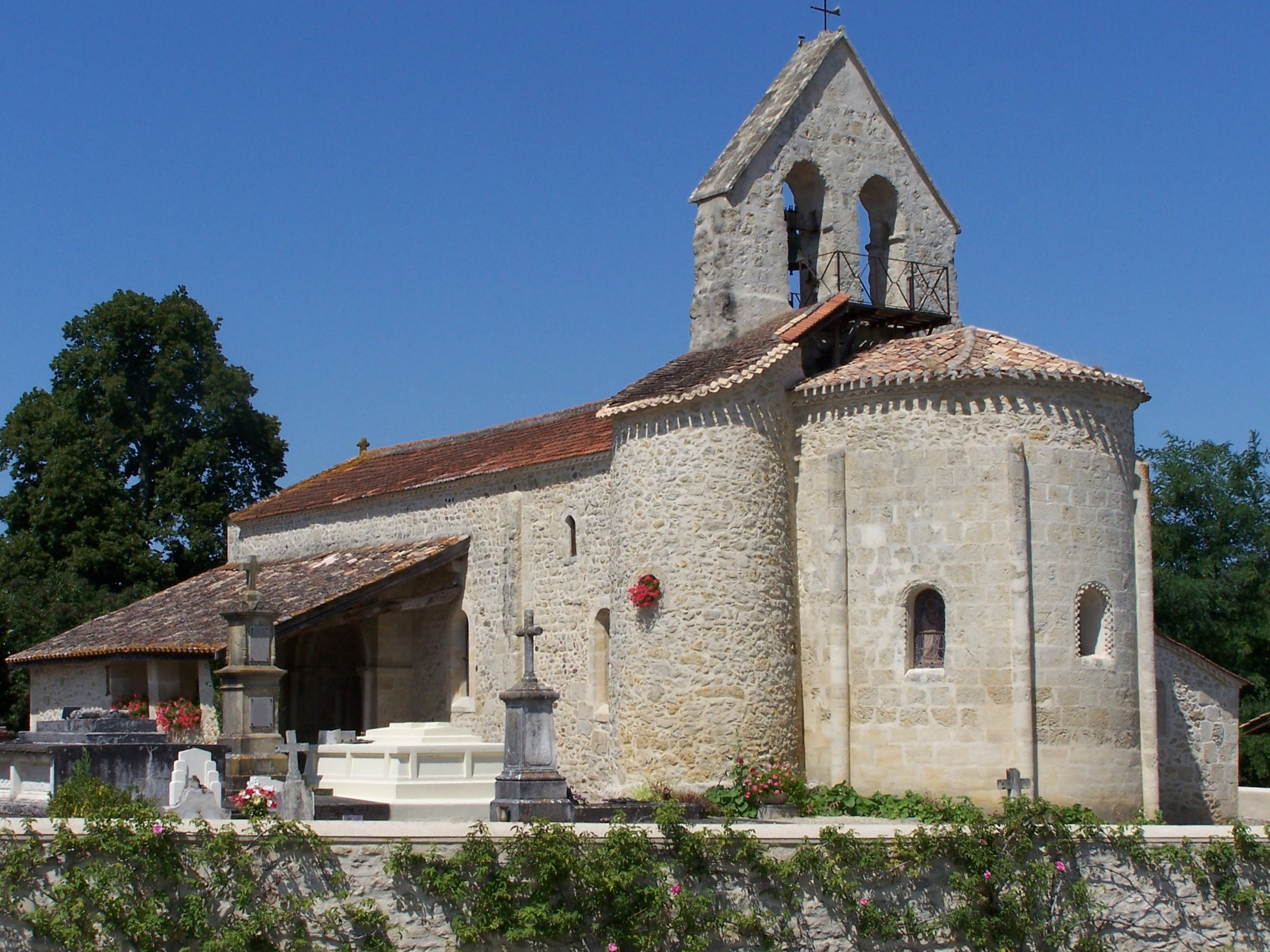
- The church in Brannens
- Location of Brannens
- Location within France Location within Nouvelle-Aquitaine
- Coordinates: 44°31′18″N 0°09′06″W
- Country: France
- Region: Nouvelle-Aquitaine
- Department: Gironde
- Arrondissement: Langon
- Canton: Le Réolais et Les Bastides

Government
  - Mayor (2020–2026): Yannick Duffau
- Area^{1}: 6.04 km^{2} (2.33 sq mi)
- Elevation: 54 m (177 ft)
- Highest elevation: 65 m (213 ft)
- Lowest elevation: 15 m (49 ft)
- Population (2023): 251
  - Density: 41.6/km^{2} (108/sq mi)
- Time zone: UTC+01:00 (CET)
  - Summer (DST): UTC+02:00 (CEST)
- INSEE/Postal code: 33072 /33124
- ^{1} French Land Register data, which excludes lakes, ponds, glaciers > 1 km^{2} (0.386 sq mi or 247 acres) and river estuaries.

Brannens is a commune in the Gironde department in Nouvelle-Aquitaine in southwestern France.

== Population ==
Historical population
Year	Pop.	±% p.a.
1968	178	—
1975	162	−1.34%
1982	176	+1.19%
1990	193	+1.16%
1999	173	−1.21%
2007	215	+2.75%
2012	217	+0.19%
2017	239	+1.95%
2023	251	+0.82%
Source: INSEE

== See also ==
- Communes of the Gironde department
