= Arrondissement of Langon =

Coordinates: 44.55°N 0.25°W

Langon
- Arrondissement
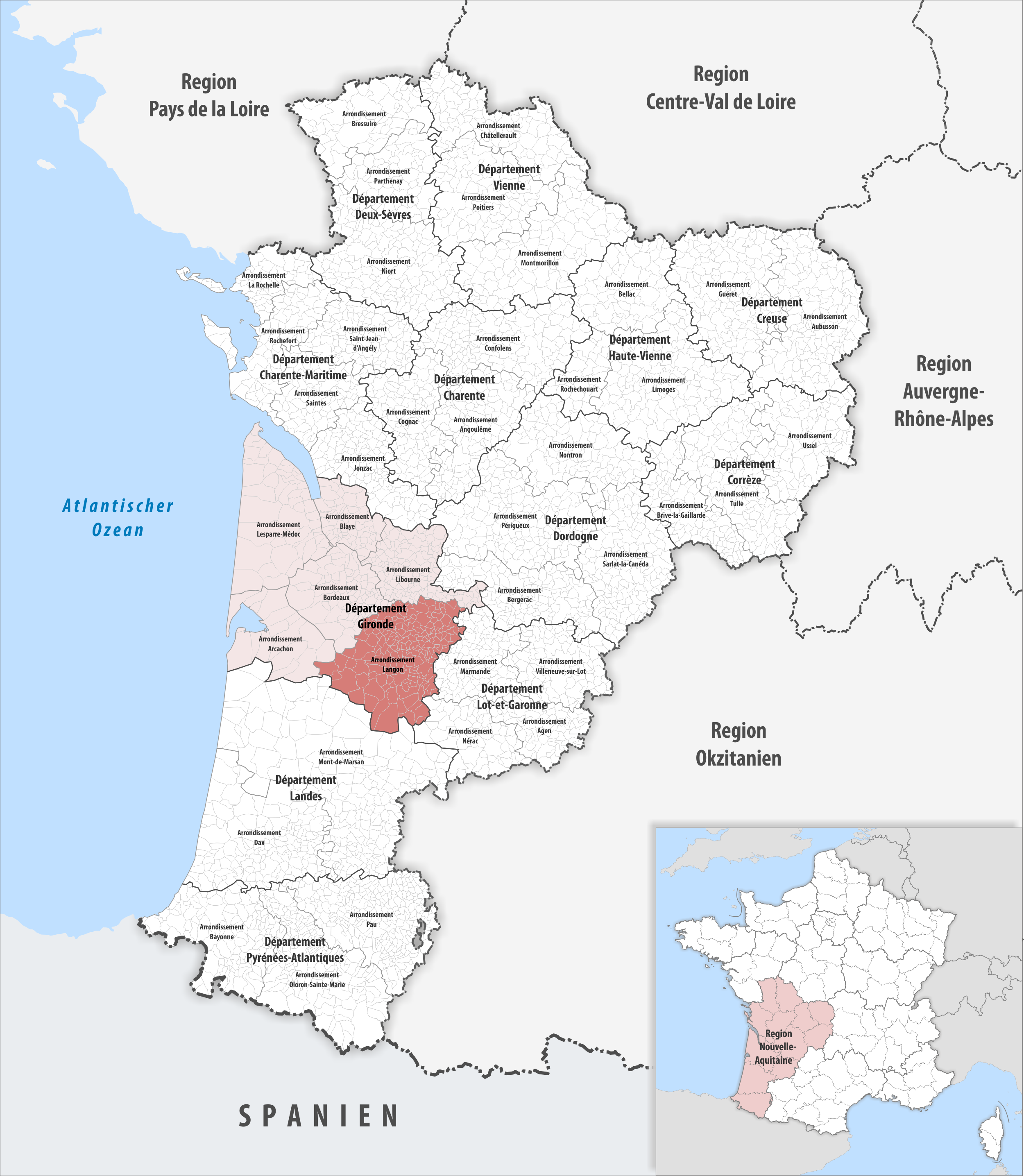
- Location within the region Nouvelle-Aquitaine
- Country: France
- Region: Nouvelle-Aquitaine
- Department: Gironde
- No. of communes: {{{nbcomm}}}
- Area: 2,644.3 km^{2} (1,021.0 sq mi)
- Population (2023): 135,533
  - Density: 51.255/km^{2} (132.75/sq mi)
- INSEE code: 333

The arrondissement of Langon is an arrondissement of France in the Gironde department in the Nouvelle-Aquitaine region. It has 195 communes. Its population is 134,250 (2021), and its area is 2,644.3 km^{2} (1,021.0 sq mi).

== Composition ==
The communes of the arrondissement of Langon are:

1. Aillas
2. Arbanats
3. Aubiac
4. Auriolles
5. Auros
6. Bagas
7. Baigneaux
8. Balizac
9. Barie
10. Barsac
11. Bassanne
12. Bazas
13. Béguey
14. Bellebat
15. Bellefond
16. Bernos-Beaulac
17. Berthez
18. Bieujac
19. Birac
20. Blaignac
21. Blasimon
22. Bommes
23. Bourdelles
24. Bourideys
25. Brannens
26. Brouqueyran
27. Budos
28. Cadillac
29. Camiran
30. Capian
31. Captieux
32. Cardan
33. Casseuil
34. Castelmoron-d'Albret
35. Castelviel
36. Castets et Castillon
37. Caudrot
38. Caumont
39. Cauvignac
40. Cazalis
41. Cazats
42. Cazaugitat
43. Cérons
44. Cessac
45. Cleyrac
46. Coimères
47. Coirac
48. Courpiac
49. Cours-de-Monségur
50. Cours-les-Bains
51. Coutures
52. Cudos
53. Daubèze
54. Dieulivol
55. Donzac
56. Escaudes
57. Escoussans
58. Les Esseintes
59. Faleyras
60. Fargues
61. Floudès
62. Fontet
63. Fossès-et-Baleyssac
64. Frontenac
65. Gabarnac
66. Gajac
67. Gans
68. Gironde-sur-Dropt
69. Giscos
70. Gornac
71. Goualade
72. Grignols
73. Guillos
74. Hostens
75. Hure
76. Illats
77. Labescau
78. Ladaux
79. Lados
80. Lamothe-Landerron
81. Landerrouat
82. Landerrouet-sur-Ségur
83. Landiras
84. Langoiran
85. Langon
86. Laroque
87. Lartigue
88. Lavazan
89. Léogeats
90. Lerm-et-Musset
91. Lestiac-sur-Garonne
92. Lignan-de-Bazas
93. Listrac-de-Durèze
94. Loubens
95. Louchats
96. Loupiac
97. Loupiac-de-la-Réole
98. Lucmau
99. Lugasson
100. Marimbault
101. Marions
102. Martres
103. Masseilles
104. Massugas
105. Mauriac
106. Mazères
107. Mérignas
108. Mesterrieux
109. Mongauzy
110. Monprimblanc
111. Monségur
112. Montagoudin
113. Montignac
114. Morizès
115. Mourens
116. Neuffons
117. Le Nizan
118. Noaillac
119. Noaillan
120. Omet
121. Origne
122. Paillet
123. Pellegrue
124. Le Pian-sur-Garonne
125. Podensac
126. Pompéjac
127. Pondaurat
128. Porte-de-Benauge
129. Portets
130. Préchac
131. Preignac
132. Pujols-sur-Ciron
133. Le Puy
134. Puybarban
135. La Réole
136. Rimons
137. Rions
138. Roaillan
139. Romagne
140. Roquebrune
141. Ruch
142. Saint-André-du-Bois
143. Saint-Antoine-du-Queyret
144. Saint-Brice
145. Saint-Côme
146. Sainte-Croix-du-Mont
147. Sainte-Foy-la-Longue
148. Sainte-Gemme
149. Saint-Exupéry
150. Saint-Félix-de-Foncaude
151. Saint-Ferme
152. Saint-Germain-de-Grave
153. Saint-Hilaire-de-la-Noaille
154. Saint-Hilaire-du-Bois
155. Saint-Laurent-du-Bois
156. Saint-Laurent-du-Plan
157. Saint-Léger-de-Balson
158. Saint-Loubert
159. Saint-Macaire
160. Saint-Maixant
161. Saint-Martial
162. Saint-Martin-de-Lerm
163. Saint-Martin-de-Sescas
164. Saint-Martin-du-Puy
165. Saint-Michel-de-Castelnau
166. Saint-Michel-de-Lapujade
167. Saint-Michel-de-Rieufret
168. Saint-Pardon-de-Conques
169. Saint-Pierre-d'Aurillac
170. Saint-Pierre-de-Bat
171. Saint-Pierre-de-Mons
172. Saint-Sève
173. Saint-Sulpice-de-Guilleragues
174. Saint-Sulpice-de-Pommiers
175. Saint-Symphorien
176. Saint-Vivien-de-Monségur
177. Sauternes
178. Sauveterre-de-Guyenne
179. Sauviac
180. Savignac
181. Semens
182. Sendets
183. Sigalens
184. Sillas
185. Soulignac
186. Soussac
187. Taillecavat
188. Targon
189. Toulenne
190. Le Tuzan
191. Uzeste
192. Verdelais
193. Villandraut
194. Villenave-de-Rions
195. Virelade

== History ==
The arrondissement of Bazas was created in 1800. The subprefecture was moved to Langon in 1926. At the May 2006 reorganisation of the arrondissements of Gironde, it gained the cantons of Cadillac and Podensac from the arrondissement of Bordeaux.

As a result of the reorganisation of the cantons of France which came into effect in 2015, the borders of the cantons are no longer related to the borders of the arrondissements. The cantons of the arrondissement of Langon were, as of January 2015:

1. Auros
2. Bazas
3. Cadillac
4. Captieux
5. Grignols
6. Langon
7. Monségur
8. Pellegrue
9. Podensac
10. La Réole
11. Saint-Macaire
12. Saint-Symphorien
13. Sauveterre-de-Guyenne
14. Targon
15. Villandraut
