= Landerrouat =

- Commune
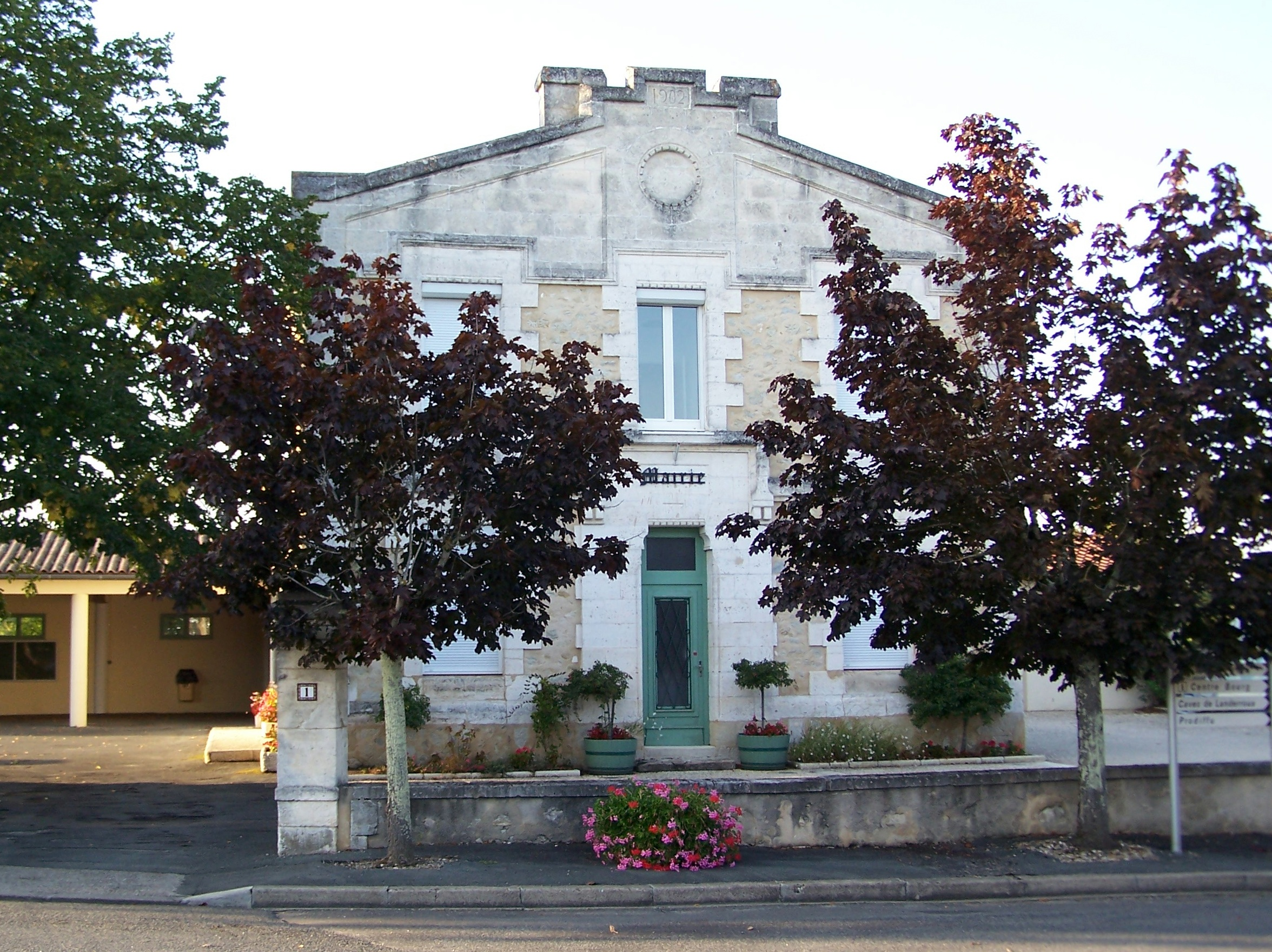
- Town hall
- Location of Landerrouat
- Location within France Location within Nouvelle-Aquitaine
- Coordinates: 44°44′35″N 0°09′34″E
- Country: France
- Region: Nouvelle-Aquitaine
- Department: Gironde
- Arrondissement: Langon
- Canton: Le Réolais et Les Bastides
- Intercommunality: Pays Foyen

Government
  - Mayor (2020–2026): Diana Conord
- Area^{1}: 4.99 km^{2} (1.93 sq mi)
- Elevation: 108 m (354 ft)
- Highest elevation: 126 m (413 ft)
- Lowest elevation: 68 m (223 ft)
- Population (2023): 217
  - Density: 43.5/km^{2} (113/sq mi)
- Time zone: UTC+01:00 (CET)
  - Summer (DST): UTC+02:00 (CEST)
- INSEE/Postal code: 33223 /33790
- ^{1} French Land Register data, which excludes lakes, ponds, glaciers > 1 km^{2} (0.386 sq mi or 247 acres) and river estuaries.

Landerrouat (occitan Landeroat) is a commune in the Gironde department in Nouvelle-Aquitaine in southwestern France.

== Population ==
Historical population
Year	Pop.	±% p.a.
1968	186	—
1975	188	+0.15%
1982	183	−0.38%
1990	193	+0.67%
1999	161	−1.99%
2007	175	+1.05%
2012	190	+1.66%
2017	208	+1.83%
2023	217	+0.71%
Source: INSEE

== See also ==
- Communes of the Gironde department
