= Cudos, Gironde =

Cudos
- Commune
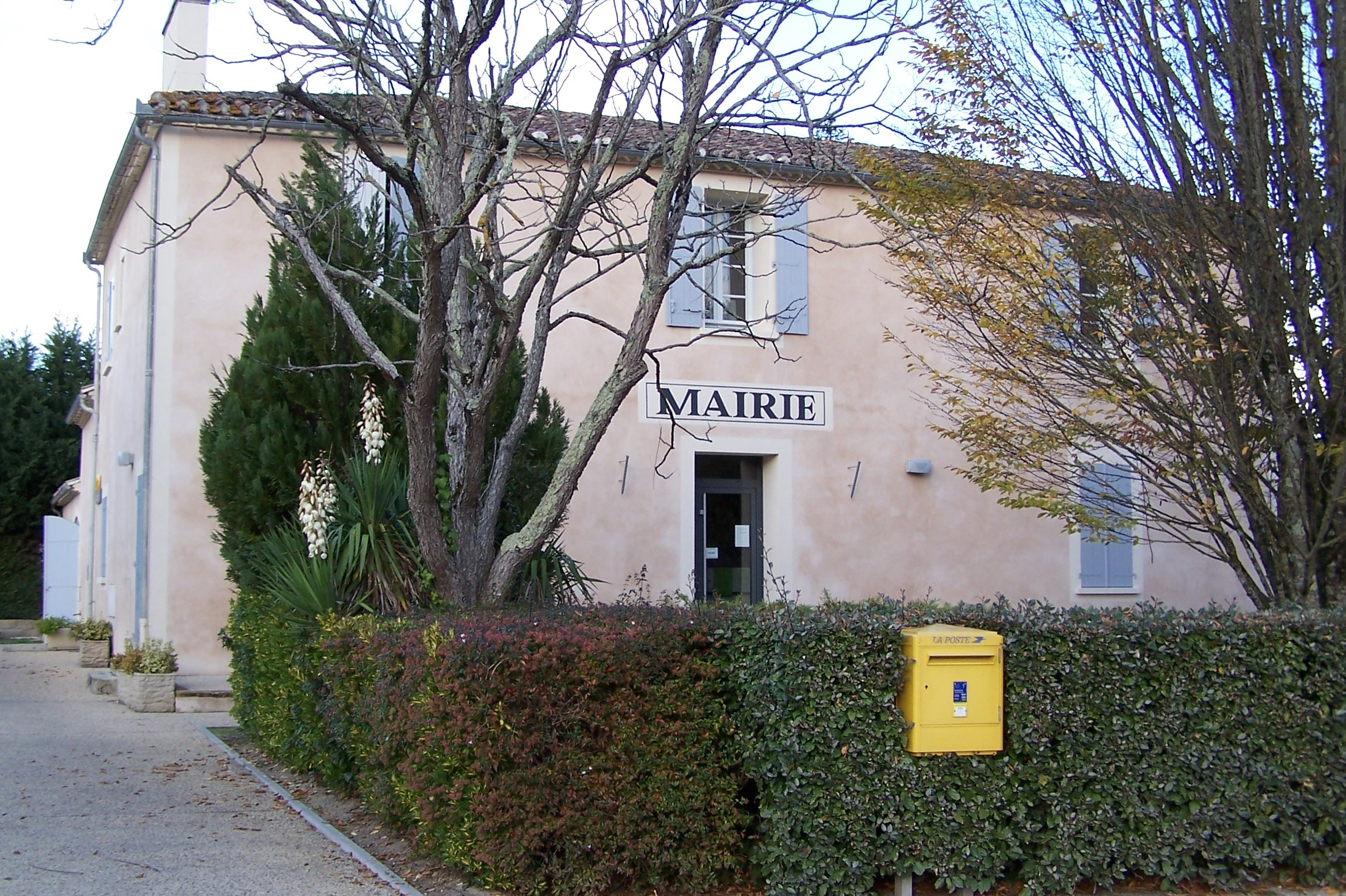
- Town hall
- Location of Cudos
- Location within France Location within Nouvelle-Aquitaine
- Coordinates: 44°23′23″N 0°13′06″W
- Country: France
- Region: Nouvelle-Aquitaine
- Department: Gironde
- Arrondissement: Langon
- Canton: Le Sud-Gironde
- Intercommunality: Bazadais

Government
  - Mayor (2020–2026): Jean-Claude Dupiol
- Area^{1}: 34.21 km^{2} (13.21 sq mi)
- Highest elevation: 133 m (436 ft)
- Lowest elevation: 60 m (200 ft)
- Population (2023): 793
  - Density: 23.2/km^{2} (60.0/sq mi)
- Time zone: UTC+01:00 (CET)
  - Summer (DST): UTC+02:00 (CEST)
- INSEE/Postal code: 33144 /33430
- ^{1} French Land Register data, which excludes lakes, ponds, glaciers > 1 km^{2} (0.386 sq mi or 247 acres) and river estuaries.

Cudos (French pronunciation: [kydɔs]; Gascon: Cudòs) is a commune in the Gironde department in southwestern France.

== Population ==
Historical population
Year	Pop.	±% p.a.
1968	597	—
1975	527	−1.77%
1982	513	−0.38%
1990	519	+0.15%
1999	559	+0.83%
2007	788	+4.39%
2012	835	+1.17%
2017	802	−0.80%
2023	793	−0.19%
Source: INSEE

== See also ==
- Communes of the Gironde department
