= Fossès-et-Baleyssac =

- Commune
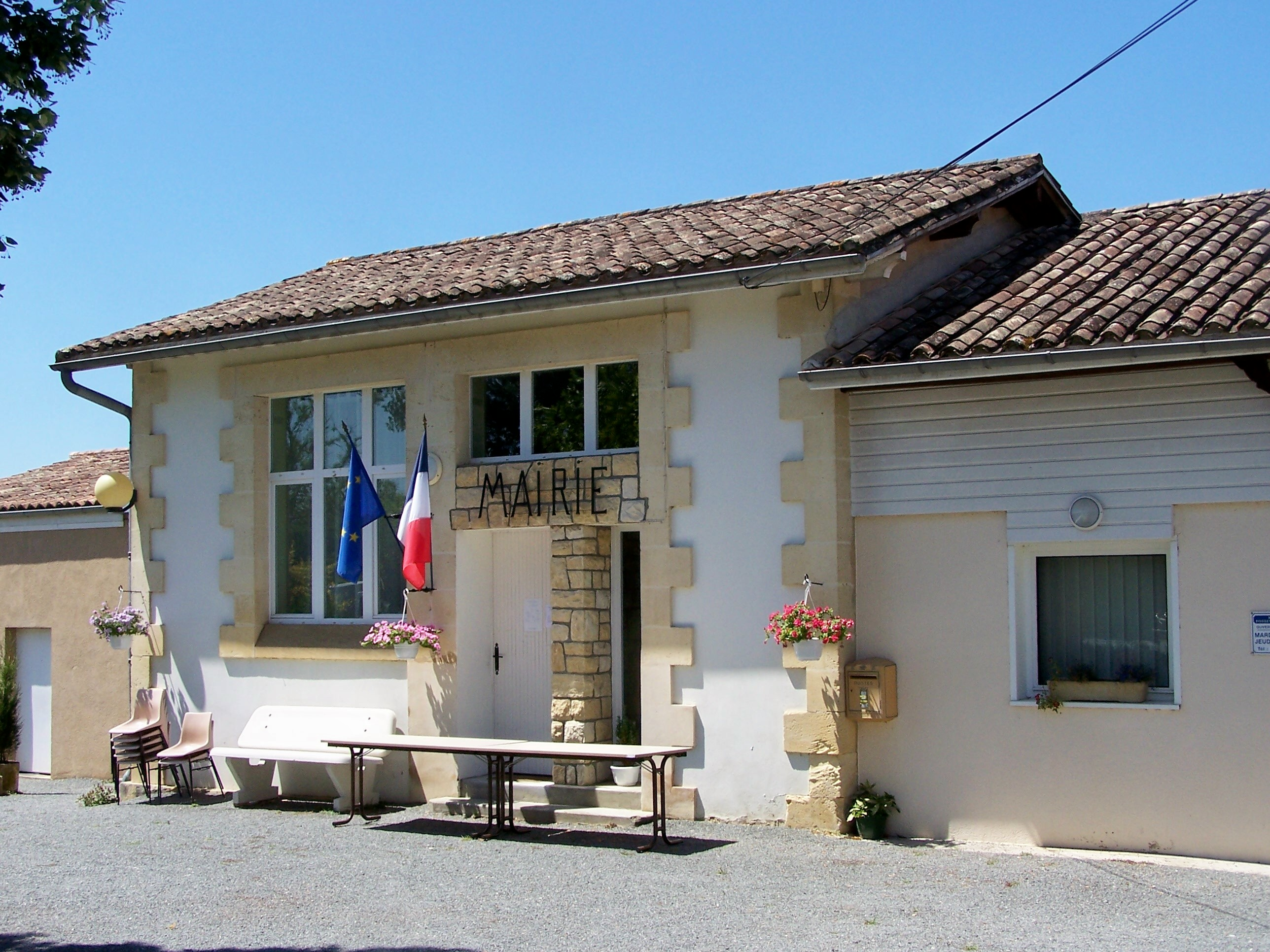
- Town hall
- Location of Fossès-et-Baleyssac
- Location within France Location within Nouvelle-Aquitaine
- Coordinates: 44°35′42″N 0°02′34″E
- Country: France
- Region: Nouvelle-Aquitaine
- Department: Gironde
- Arrondissement: Langon
- Canton: Le Réolais et Les Bastides
- Intercommunality: Réolais en Sud Gironde

Government
  - Mayor (2020–2026): Alain Doux
- Area^{1}: 9.4 km^{2} (3.6 sq mi)
- Elevation: 84 m (276 ft)
- Highest elevation: 113 m (371 ft)
- Lowest elevation: 33 m (108 ft)
- Population (2023): 222
  - Density: 24/km^{2} (61/sq mi)
- Time zone: UTC+01:00 (CET)
  - Summer (DST): UTC+02:00 (CEST)
- INSEE/Postal code: 33171 /33190
- ^{1} French Land Register data, which excludes lakes, ponds, glaciers > 1 km^{2} (0.386 sq mi or 247 acres) and river estuaries.

Fossès-et-Baleyssac is a commune in the Gironde department in Nouvelle-Aquitaine in southwestern France.

== Population ==
Historical population
| Year | Pop. | ±% p.a. |
|---|---|---|
| 1968 | 158 | — |
| 1975 | 132 | −2.54% |
| 1982 | 118 | −1.59% |
| 1990 | 136 | +1.79% |
| 1999 | 158 | +1.68% |
| 2007 | 187 | +2.13% |
| 2012 | 186 | −0.11% |
| 2017 | 224 | +3.79% |
| 2023 | 222 | −0.15% |
Source: INSEE

== See also ==
- Communes of the Gironde department
