= Caumont, Gironde =

Caumont
- Commune
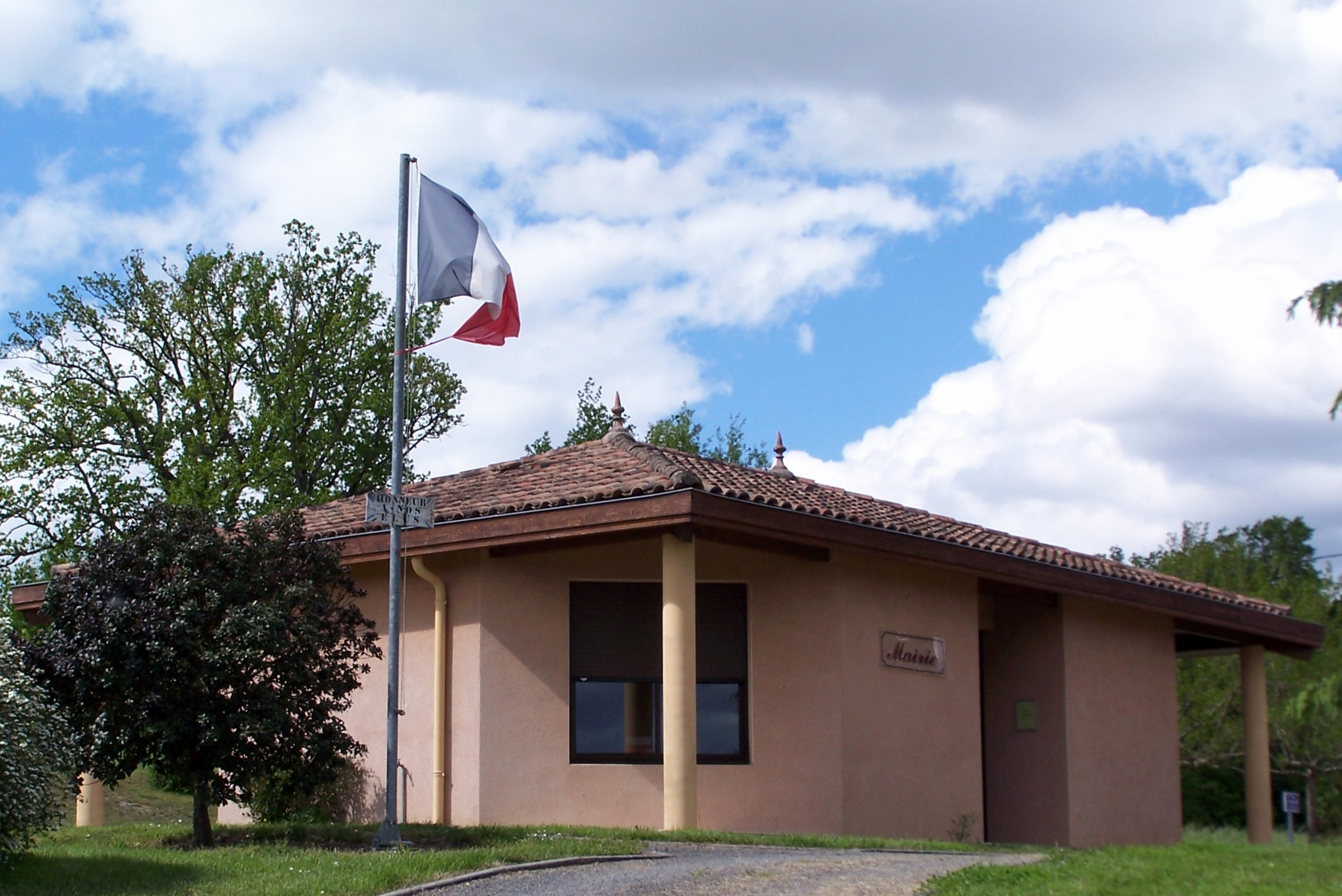
- Town hall

- Coat of arms
- Location of Caumont
- Location within France Location within Nouvelle-Aquitaine
- Coordinates: 44°41′44″N 0°00′13″W
- Country: France
- Region: Nouvelle-Aquitaine
- Department: Gironde
- Arrondissement: Langon
- Canton: Le Réolais et Les Bastides

Government
  - Mayor (2020–2026): Benjamin Malambic
- Area^{1}: 7.58 km^{2} (2.93 sq mi)
- Elevation: 73 m (240 ft)
- Highest elevation: 108 m (354 ft)
- Lowest elevation: 37 m (121 ft)
- Population (2023): 133
  - Density: 17.5/km^{2} (45.4/sq mi)
- Time zone: UTC+01:00 (CET)
  - Summer (DST): UTC+02:00 (CEST)
- INSEE/Postal code: 33112 /33540
- ^{1} French Land Register data, which excludes lakes, ponds, glaciers > 1 km^{2} (0.386 sq mi or 247 acres) and river estuaries.

Caumont (French pronunciation: [komɔ̃]) is a commune in the Gironde department in Nouvelle-Aquitaine in southwestern France.

== Population ==
Historical population
Year	Pop.	±% p.a.
1968	204	—
1975	146	−4.67%
1982	143	−0.30%
1990	138	−0.44%
1999	122	−1.36%
2007	154	+2.95%
2012	158	+0.51%
2017	147	−1.43%
2023	133	−1.65%
Source: INSEE

== See also ==
- Communes of the Gironde department
