= Rimons =

- Commune
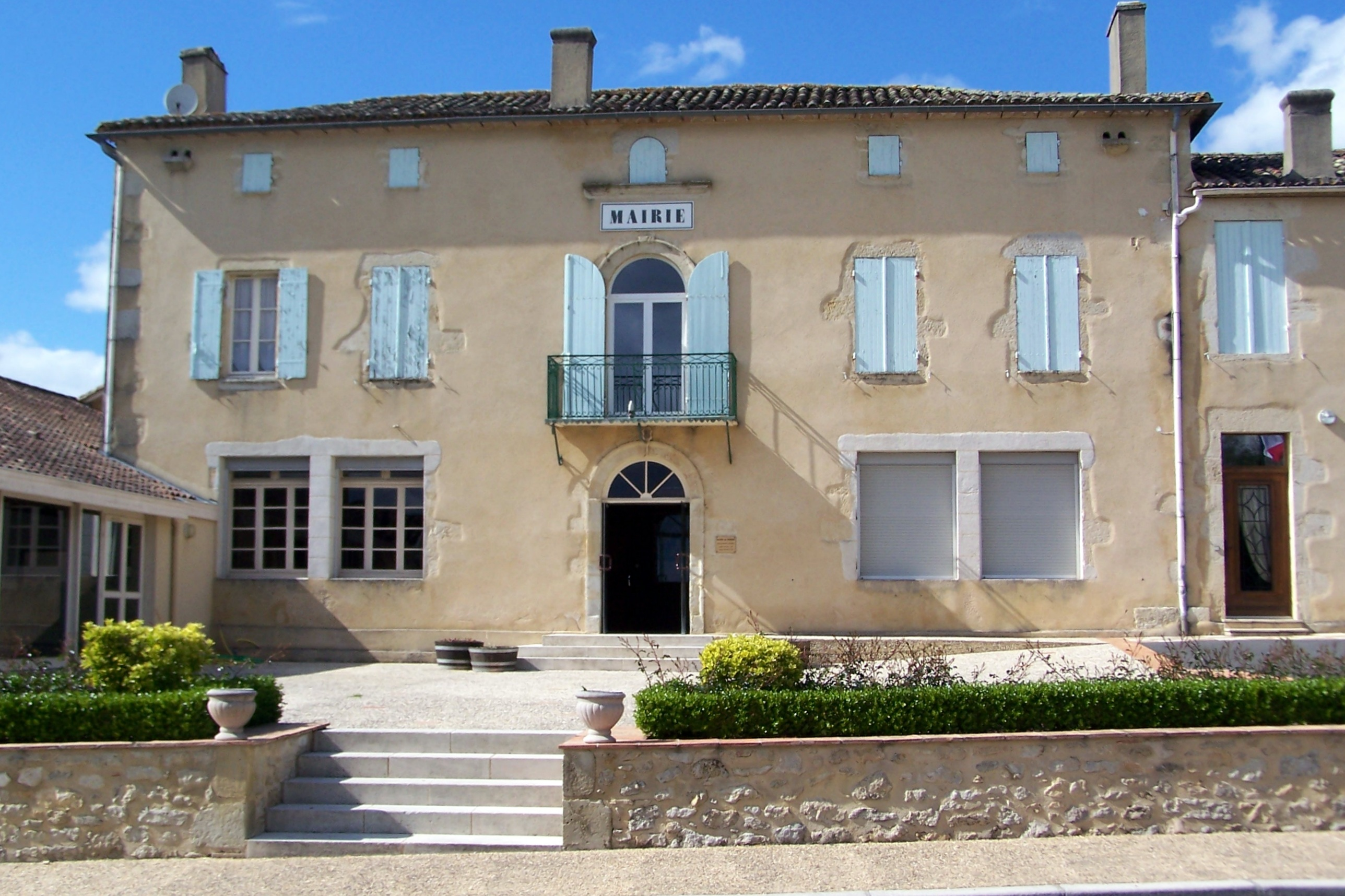
- Town hall
- Location of Rimons
- Location within France Location within Nouvelle-Aquitaine
- Coordinates: 44°40′22″N 0°00′25″E
- Country: France
- Region: Nouvelle-Aquitaine
- Department: Gironde
- Arrondissement: Langon
- Canton: Le Réolais et Les Bastides

Government
  - Mayor (2020–2026): René Boudigue
- Area^{1}: 14.38 km^{2} (5.55 sq mi)
- Highest elevation: 106 m (348 ft)
- Lowest elevation: 29 m (95 ft)
- Population (2023): 198
  - Density: 13.8/km^{2} (35.7/sq mi)
- Time zone: UTC+01:00 (CET)
  - Summer (DST): UTC+02:00 (CEST)
- INSEE/Postal code: 33353 /33580
- ^{1} French Land Register data, which excludes lakes, ponds, glaciers > 1 km^{2} (0.386 sq mi or 247 acres) and river estuaries.

Rimons is a commune in the Gironde department in Nouvelle-Aquitaine in southwestern France.

== Population ==
Historical population
Year	Pop.	±% p.a.
1968	246	—
1975	194	−3.34%
1982	181	−0.99%
1990	188	+0.48%
1999	190	+0.12%
2007	195	+0.33%
2012	204	+0.91%
2017	192	−1.21%
2023	198	+0.51%
Source: INSEE

== See also ==
- Communes of the Gironde department
