= Berthez =

- Commune
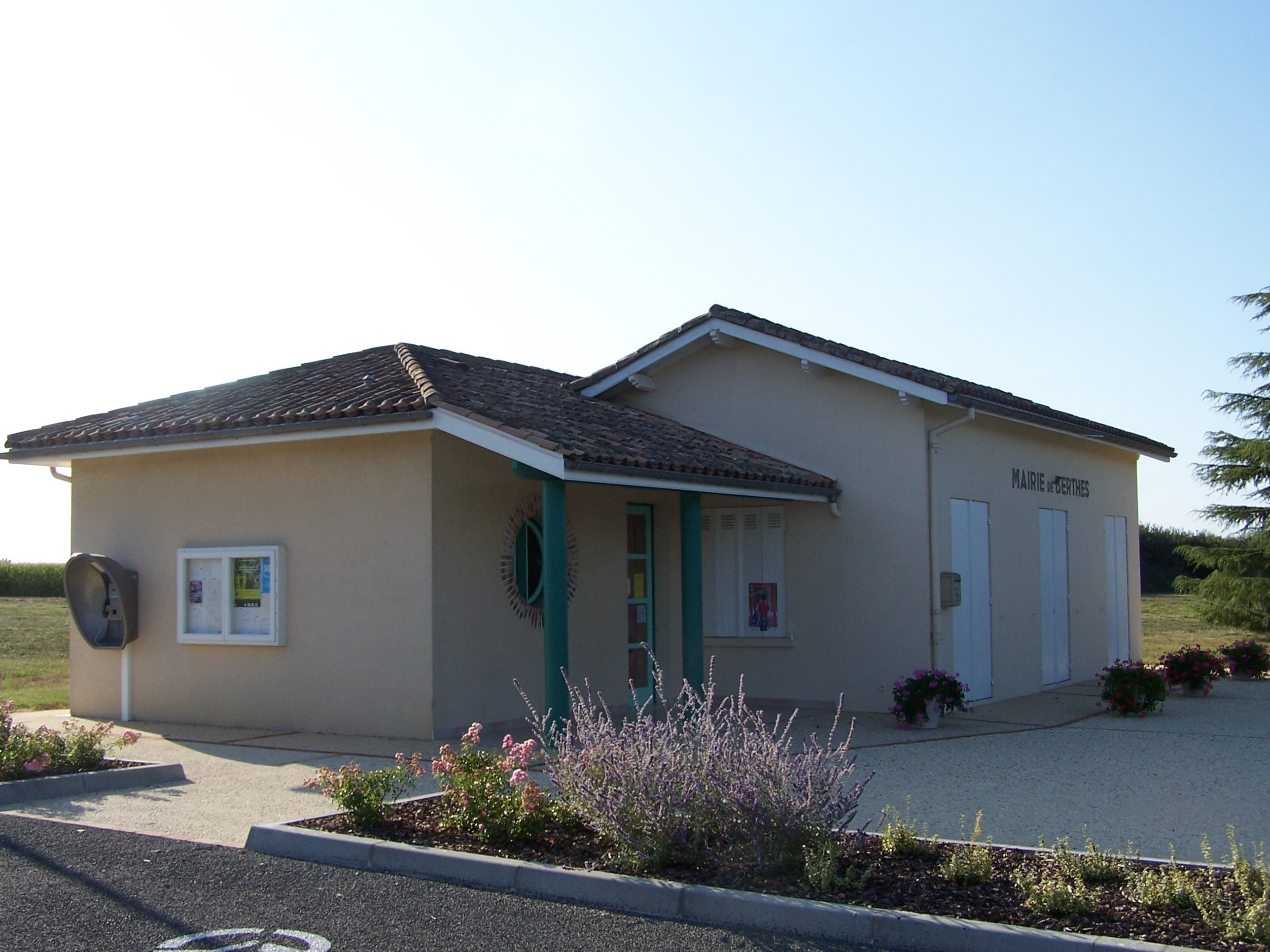
- Town hall

- Coat of arms
- Location of Berthez
- Location within France Location within Nouvelle-Aquitaine
- Coordinates: 44°29′09″N 0°08′03″W
- Country: France
- Region: Nouvelle-Aquitaine
- Department: Gironde
- Arrondissement: Langon
- Canton: Le Réolais et Les Bastides

Government
  - Mayor (2020–2026): Guy Dubouilh
- Area^{1}: 6.03 km^{2} (2.33 sq mi)
- Elevation: 107 m (351 ft)
- Highest elevation: 115 m (377 ft)
- Lowest elevation: 29 m (95 ft)
- Population (2023): 301
  - Density: 49.9/km^{2} (129/sq mi)
- Time zone: UTC+01:00 (CET)
  - Summer (DST): UTC+02:00 (CEST)
- INSEE/Postal code: 33048 /33124
- ^{1} French Land Register data, which excludes lakes, ponds, glaciers > 1 km^{2} (0.386 sq mi or 247 acres) and river estuaries.

Berthez is a commune in the Gironde department in Nouvelle-Aquitaine in southwestern France.

== Population ==
Historical population
| Year | Pop. | ±% p.a. |
|---|---|---|
| 1968 | 152 | — |
| 1975 | 119 | −3.44% |
| 1982 | 102 | −2.18% |
| 1990 | 142 | +4.22% |
| 1999 | 166 | +1.75% |
| 2007 | 210 | +2.98% |
| 2012 | 232 | +2.01% |
| 2017 | 263 | +2.54% |
| 2023 | 301 | +2.27% |
Source: INSEE

== See also ==
- Communes of the Gironde department
