= Bourdelles =

- Commune
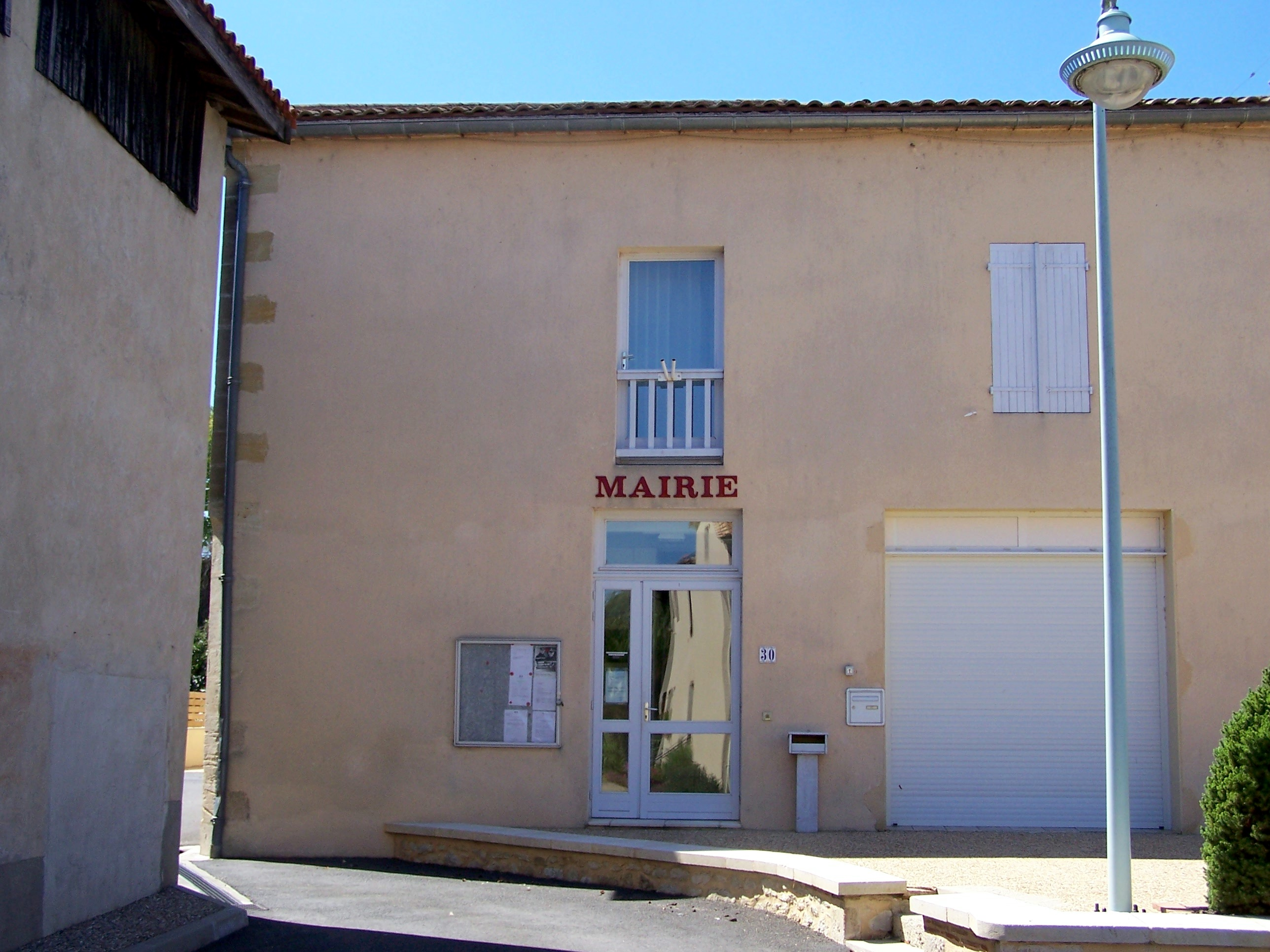
- Town hall
- Location of Bourdelles
- Location within France Location within Nouvelle-Aquitaine
- Coordinates: 44°33′15″N 0°00′02″E
- Country: France
- Region: Nouvelle-Aquitaine
- Department: Gironde
- Arrondissement: Langon
- Canton: Le Réolais et Les Bastides
- Intercommunality: Réolais en Sud Gironde

Government
  - Mayor (2020–2026): Jean-Michel Mascotto
- Area^{1}: 7.06 km^{2} (2.73 sq mi)
- Highest elevation: 40 m (130 ft)
- Lowest elevation: 7 m (23 ft)
- Population (2023): 97
  - Density: 14/km^{2} (36/sq mi)
- Time zone: UTC+01:00 (CET)
  - Summer (DST): UTC+02:00 (CEST)
- INSEE/Postal code: 33066 /33190
- ^{1} French Land Register data, which excludes lakes, ponds, glaciers > 1 km^{2} (0.386 sq mi or 247 acres) and river estuaries.

Bourdelles (French pronunciation: [buʁdɛl]; Occitan: Bordèras) is a commune in the Gironde department in Nouvelle-Aquitaine in southwestern France. It lies on the right bank of the Garonne, upstream from La Réole.

== Population ==
Historical population
Year	Pop.	±% p.a.
1968	232	—
1975	187	−3.03%
1982	159	−2.29%
1990	119	−3.56%
1999	107	−1.17%
2007	122	+1.65%
2012	109	−2.23%
2017	93	−3.13%
2023	97	+0.70%
Source: INSEE

== See also ==
- Communes of the Gironde department
