= Cazalis, Gironde =

Cazalis
- Commune
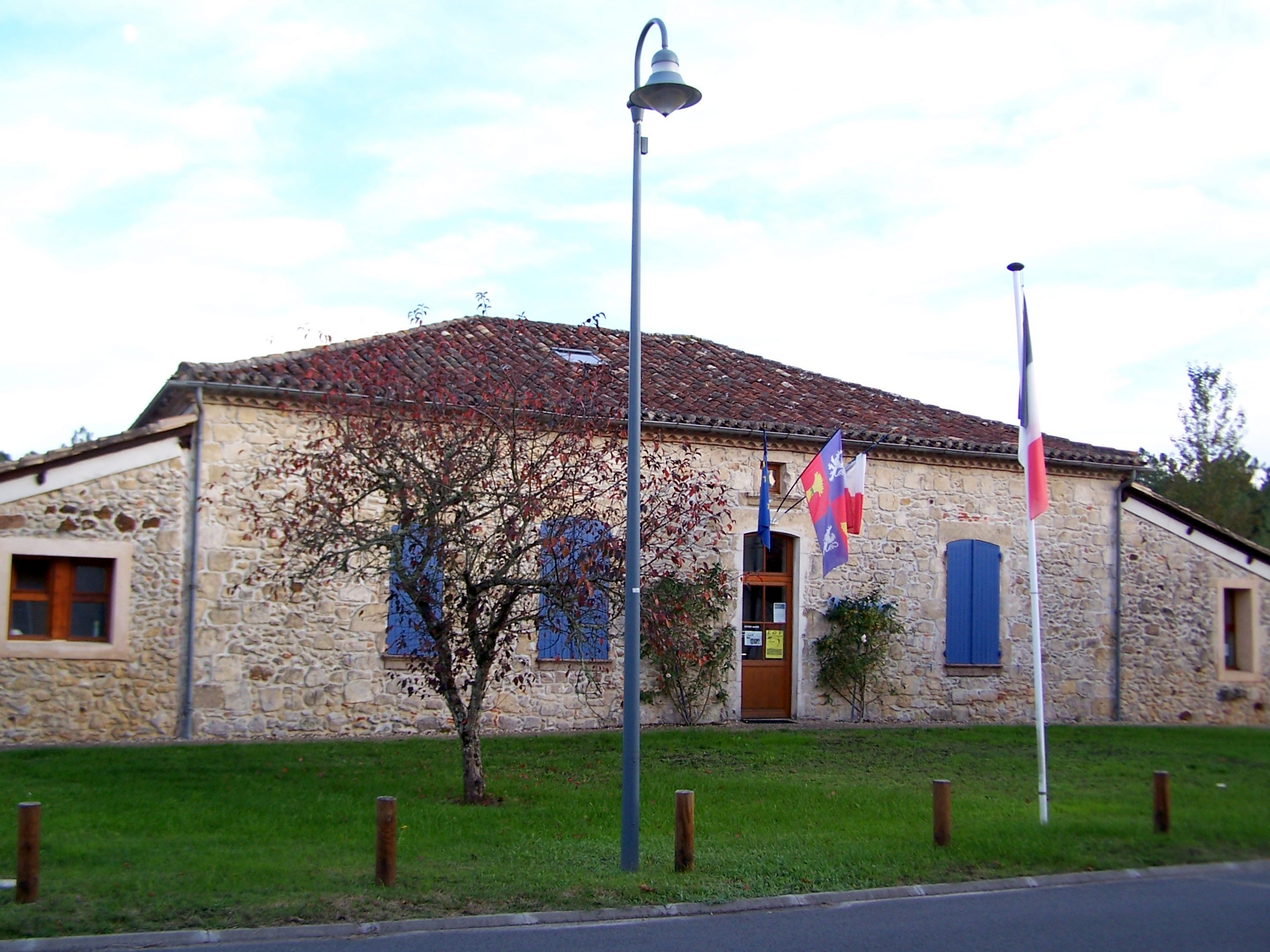
- The town hall in Cazalis
- Location of Cazalis
- Location within France Location within Nouvelle-Aquitaine
- Coordinates: 44°20′34″N 0°22′44″W
- Country: France
- Region: Nouvelle-Aquitaine
- Department: Gironde
- Arrondissement: Langon
- Canton: Le Sud-Gironde

Government
  - Mayor (2020–2026): Jean-Claude Lassalle
- Area^{1}: 46.81 km^{2} (18.07 sq mi)
- Elevation: 102 m (335 ft)
- Highest elevation: 130 m (430 ft)
- Lowest elevation: 79 m (259 ft)
- Population (2023): 269
  - Density: 5.75/km^{2} (14.9/sq mi)
- Time zone: UTC+01:00 (CET)
  - Summer (DST): UTC+02:00 (CEST)
- INSEE/Postal code: 33115 /33113
- ^{1} French Land Register data, which excludes lakes, ponds, glaciers > 1 km^{2} (0.386 sq mi or 247 acres) and river estuaries.

Cazalis (French pronunciation: [kazalis]; Gascon: Casalís) is a commune in the Gironde department in Nouvelle-Aquitaine in southwestern France.

== Population ==
Historical population
Year	Pop.	±% p.a.
1968	199	—
1975	180	−1.42%
1982	158	−1.85%
1990	177	+1.43%
1999	179	+0.12%
2007	215	+2.32%
2012	240	+2.22%
2017	236	−0.34%
2023	269	+2.21%
Source: INSEE

== See also ==
- Communes of the Gironde department
