= Roquebrune, Gironde =

Roquebrune
- Commune
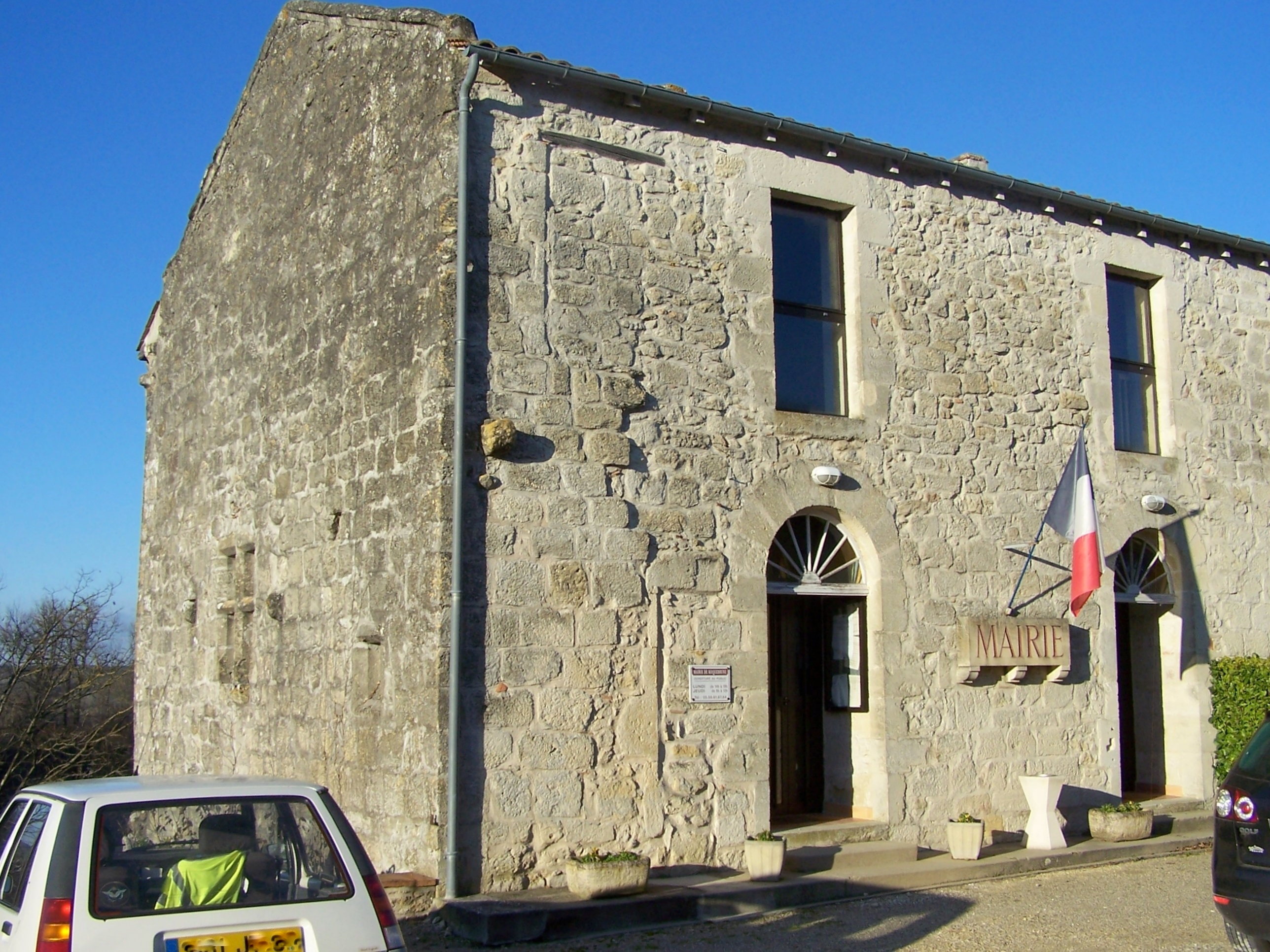
- Town hall
- Location of Roquebrune
- Location within France Location within Nouvelle-Aquitaine
- Coordinates: 44°37′48″N 0°01′23″E
- Country: France
- Region: Nouvelle-Aquitaine
- Department: Gironde
- Arrondissement: Langon
- Canton: Le Réolais et Les Bastides

Government
  - Mayor (2020–2026): Jacky Britton
- Area^{1}: 6.52 km^{2} (2.52 sq mi)
- Highest elevation: 108 m (354 ft)
- Lowest elevation: 14 m (46 ft)
- Population (2023): 279
  - Density: 42.8/km^{2} (111/sq mi)
- Time zone: UTC+01:00 (CET)
  - Summer (DST): UTC+02:00 (CEST)
- INSEE/Postal code: 33359 /33580
- ^{1} French Land Register data, which excludes lakes, ponds, glaciers > 1 km^{2} (0.386 sq mi or 247 acres) and river estuaries.

Roquebrune (French pronunciation: [ʁɔk(ə)bʁyn]; Occitan: Ròcabruna, [rɔkaˈbryno]) is a commune in the department of Gironde, and the region of Nouvelle-Aquitaine (before 2015: Aquitaine), southwestern France.

== Population ==
Historical population
Year	Pop.	±% p.a.
1968	258	—
1975	237	−1.21%
1982	230	−0.43%
1990	213	−0.96%
1999	217	+0.21%
2007	227	+0.56%
2012	253	+2.19%
2017	280	+2.05%
2023	279	−0.06%
Source: INSEE

== See also ==
- Communes of the Gironde department
