= Saint-Martin-du-Puy, Gironde =

Saint-Martin-du-Puy
- Commune
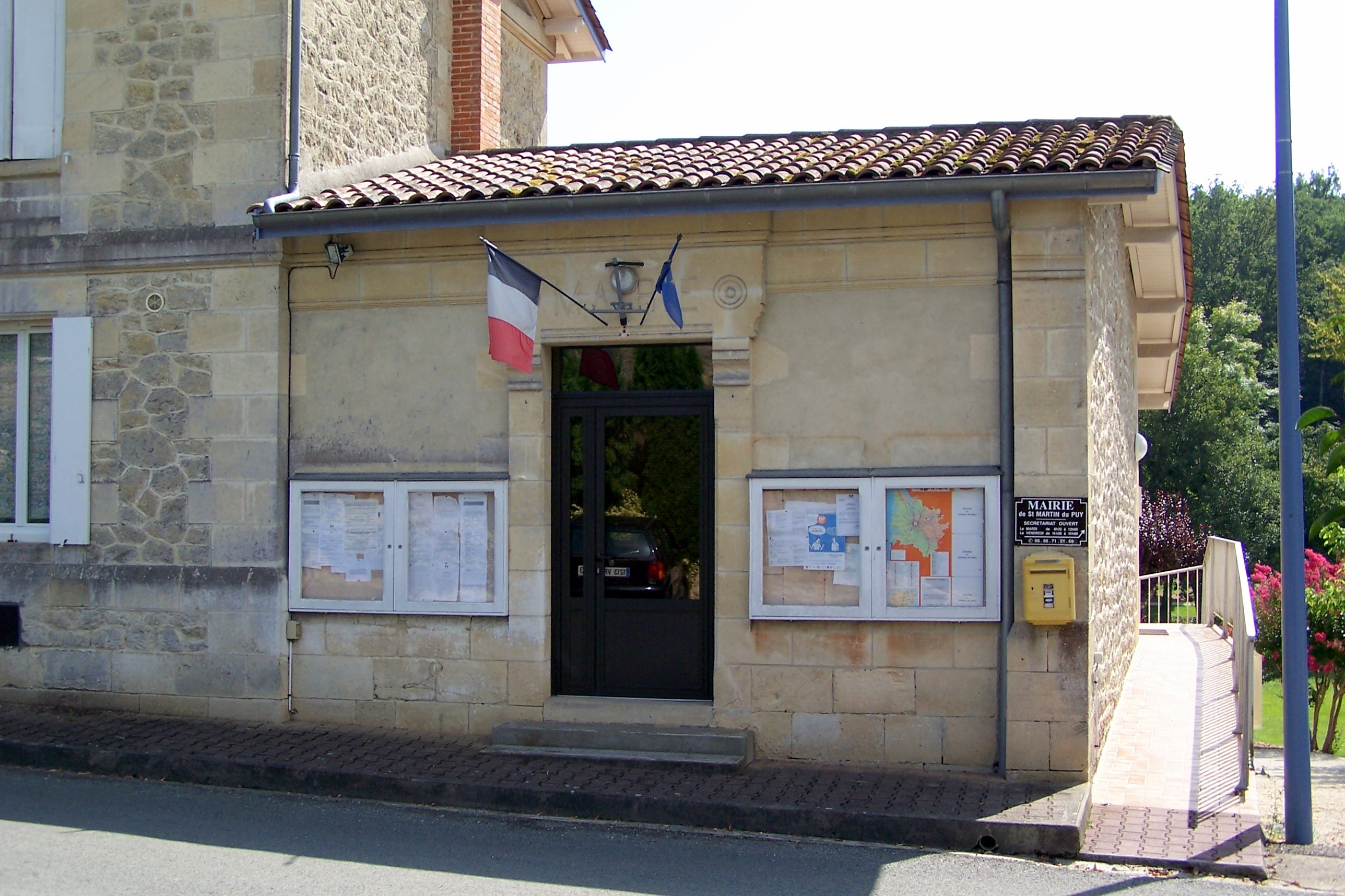
- Town hall
- Location of Saint-Martin-du-Puy
- Location within France Location within Nouvelle-Aquitaine
- Coordinates: 44°39′49″N 0°10′50″W
- Country: France
- Region: Nouvelle-Aquitaine
- Department: Gironde
- Arrondissement: Langon
- Canton: Le Réolais et Les Bastides

Government
  - Mayor (2020–2026): Martine Lopez
- Area^{1}: 8.35 km^{2} (3.22 sq mi)
- Elevation: 109 m (358 ft)
- Highest elevation: 113 m (371 ft)
- Lowest elevation: 54 m (177 ft)
- Population (2023): 163
  - Density: 19.5/km^{2} (50.6/sq mi)
- Time zone: UTC+01:00 (CET)
  - Summer (DST): UTC+02:00 (CEST)
- INSEE/Postal code: 33446 /33540
- ^{1} French Land Register data, which excludes lakes, ponds, glaciers > 1 km^{2} (0.386 sq mi or 247 acres) and river estuaries.

Saint-Martin-du-Puy (French pronunciation: [sɛ̃ maʁtɛ̃ dy pɥi]; Gascon: Sent Martin deu Pot) is a commune in the Gironde department in Nouvelle-Aquitaine in southwestern France.

== Population ==
Historical population
Year	Pop.	±% p.a.
1968	231	—
1975	205	−1.69%
1982	237	+2.09%
1990	242	+0.26%
1999	228	−0.66%
2007	210	−1.02%
2012	198	−1.17%
2017	183	−1.56%
2023	163	−1.91%
Source: INSEE

== See also ==
- Communes of the Gironde department
