= Sendets, Gironde =

Sendets
- Commune
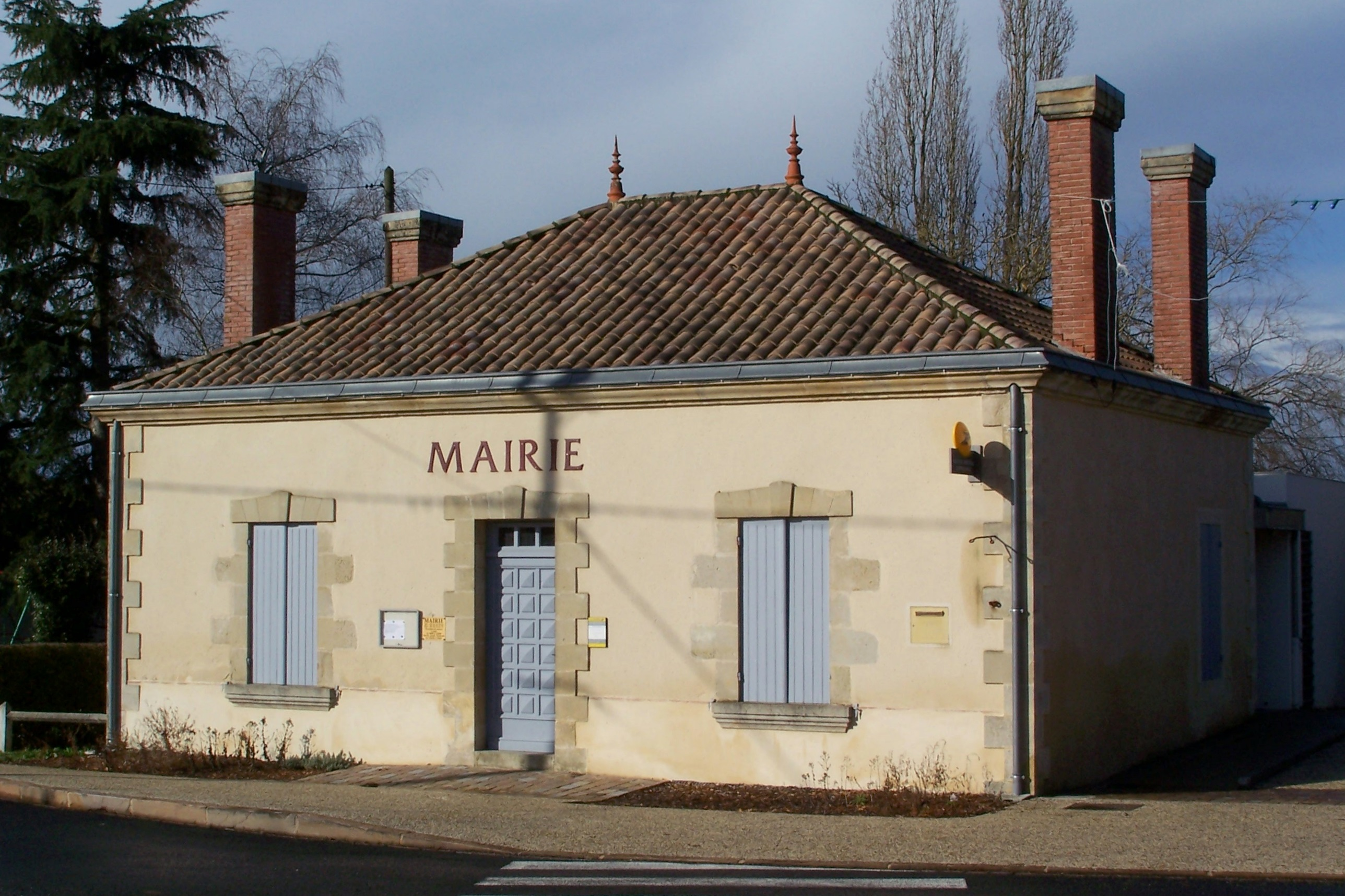
- The town hall in Sendets
- Location of Sendets
- Location within France Location within Nouvelle-Aquitaine
- Coordinates: 44°25′25″N 0°05′14″W
- Country: France
- Region: Nouvelle-Aquitaine
- Department: Gironde
- Arrondissement: Langon
- Canton: Le Sud-Gironde
- Intercommunality: Bazadais

Government
  - Mayor (2020–2026): Éric Vigneau
- Area^{1}: 8.36 km^{2} (3.23 sq mi)
- Elevation: 142 m (466 ft)
- Highest elevation: 144 m (472 ft)
- Lowest elevation: 78 m (256 ft)
- Population (2023): 354
  - Density: 42.3/km^{2} (110/sq mi)
- Time zone: UTC+01:00 (CET)
  - Summer (DST): UTC+02:00 (CEST)
- INSEE/Postal code: 33511 /33690
- ^{1} French Land Register data, which excludes lakes, ponds, glaciers > 1 km^{2} (0.386 sq mi or 247 acres) and river estuaries.

Sendets is a commune in the Gironde department in Nouvelle-Aquitaine in southwestern France.

== Population ==
Historical population
Year	Pop.	±% p.a.
1968	328	—
1975	288	−1.84%
1982	232	−3.04%
1990	234	+0.11%
1999	255	+0.96%
2007	297	+1.92%
2012	354	+3.57%
2017	334	−1.16%
2023	354	+0.97%
Source: INSEE

== See also ==
- Communes of the Gironde department
