= 2022 European and Mediterranean wildfires =

Wildfires in Europe and North Africa

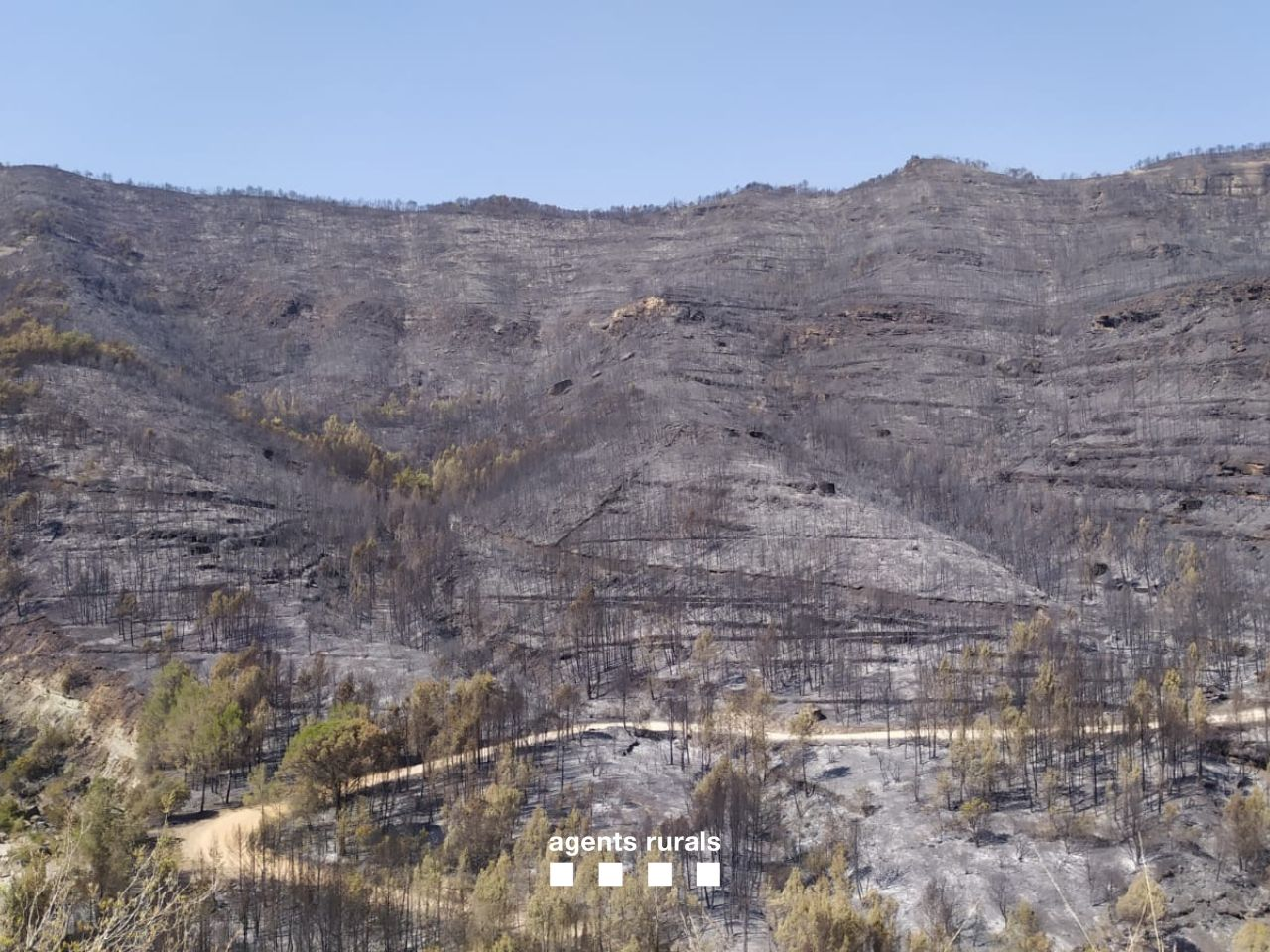
- Site of a forest fire at El Pont de Vilomara i Rocafort, Catalonia, Spain
- Date: March — August 2022
- Location: Europe, the Middle East and North Africa

Statistics
- Burned area: 1,500,978 ha (3,708,997 acres; 15,010 km^{2}; 5,795 sq mi)

Impacts
- Deaths: 41 (Note: Algeria: 38 Morocco: 1 Portugal: 1 Spain: 1)
- Evacuated: 45,211 (Note: France:36,750 Turkey: 3,530 Spain: 2,300 Morocco: 1,831 Portugal: 800 Algeria: 350)

From March to August 2022, parts of Europe, the Middle East and North Africa were affected by wildfires, with Mediterranean countries affected the most. 2022 was ranked as the second worst year with 900,000 hectares burned, after 2017 with 1.3 million hectares. About 365,000 hectares of protected Natura 2000 sites were damaged (the highest number in 10 years at the time) specifically in Romania, Spain, Portugal, and France.

== By country ==
Burned area by country
Country	Area	Source
Albania	17,764 ha (43,896 acres; 178 km^{2}; 69 sq mi)	
Algeria	52,556 ha (129,869 acres; 526 km^{2}; 203 sq mi)	
Austria	1,016 ha (2,511 acres; 10 km^{2}; 4 sq mi)	
Belgium	382 ha (944 acres; 4 km^{2}; 1 sq mi)	
Bosnia and Herzegovina	72,899 ha (180,137 acres; 729 km^{2}; 281 sq mi)	
Bulgaria	14,579 ha (36,025 acres; 146 km^{2}; 56 sq mi)	
Croatia	32,943 ha (81,404 acres; 329 km^{2}; 127 sq mi)	
Cyprus	2,540 ha (6,276 acres; 25 km^{2}; 10 sq mi)	
Czechia	1,436 ha (3,548 acres; 14 km^{2}; 6 sq mi)	
Denmark	341 ha (843 acres; 3 km^{2}; 1 sq mi)	
Egypt	2,059 ha (5,088 acres; 21 km^{2}; 8 sq mi)	
Finland	160 ha (395 acres; 2 km^{2}; 1 sq mi)	
France	66,337 ha (163,922 acres; 663 km^{2}; 256 sq mi)	
Germany	4,293 ha (10,608 acres; 43 km^{2}; 17 sq mi)	
Greece	174,773 ha (431,873 acres; 1,748 km^{2}; 675 sq mi)	
Ireland	2,982 ha (7,369 acres; 30 km^{2}; 12 sq mi)	
Italy	97,984 ha (242,124 acres; 980 km^{2}; 378 sq mi)	
Kosovo	3,739 ha (9,239 acres; 37 km^{2}; 14 sq mi)	
Latvia	171 ha (423 acres; 2 km^{2}; 1 sq mi)	
Lebanon	119 ha (294 acres; 1 km^{2}; 0 sq mi)	
Libya	173 ha (427 acres; 2 km^{2}; 1 sq mi)	
Montenegro	24,579 ha (60,736 acres; 246 km^{2}; 95 sq mi)	
Morocco	32,132 ha (79,400 acres; 321 km^{2}; 124 sq mi)	
Netherlands	271 ha (670 acres; 3 km^{2}; 1 sq mi)	
North Macedonia	3,806 ha (9,405 acres; 38 km^{2}; 15 sq mi)	
Norway	2,143 ha (5,295 acres; 21 km^{2}; 8 sq mi)	
Poland	465 ha (1,149 acres; 5 km^{2}; 2 sq mi)	
Portugal	104,379 ha (257,926 acres; 1,044 km^{2}; 403 sq mi)	
Romania	153,207 ha (378,583 acres; 1,532 km^{2}; 592 sq mi)	
Serbia	11,508 ha (28,437 acres; 115 km^{2}; 44 sq mi)	
Slovakia	317 ha (783 acres; 3 km^{2}; 1 sq mi)	
Slovenia	4,388 ha (10,843 acres; 44 km^{2}; 17 sq mi)	
Spain	306,555 ha (757,514 acres; 3,066 km^{2}; 1,184 sq mi)	
Sweden	266 ha (657 acres; 3 km^{2}; 1 sq mi)	
Switzerland	235 ha (581 acres; 2 km^{2}; 1 sq mi)	
Tunisia	10,846 ha (26,801 acres; 108 km^{2}; 42 sq mi)	
Turkey	15,685 ha (38,758 acres; 157 km^{2}; 61 sq mi)	
Ukraine	260,588 ha (643,927 acres; 2,606 km^{2}; 1,006 sq mi)	
United Kingdom	20,362 ha (50,316 acres; 204 km^{2}; 79 sq mi)	
Total	1,500,978 ha (3,708,997 acres; 15,010 km^{2}; 5,795 sq mi)	

Map of 2022 European wildfires (≥ 1000 ha) (map data)

Location of the 2022 European and Mediterranean wildfires since 19 July 2022

=== Albania ===
In Krasta and Krujë, more than 50 hectares (120 acres) of forest were destroyed by wildfires. There were also large fires reported in Lezhë County.

=== Algeria ===
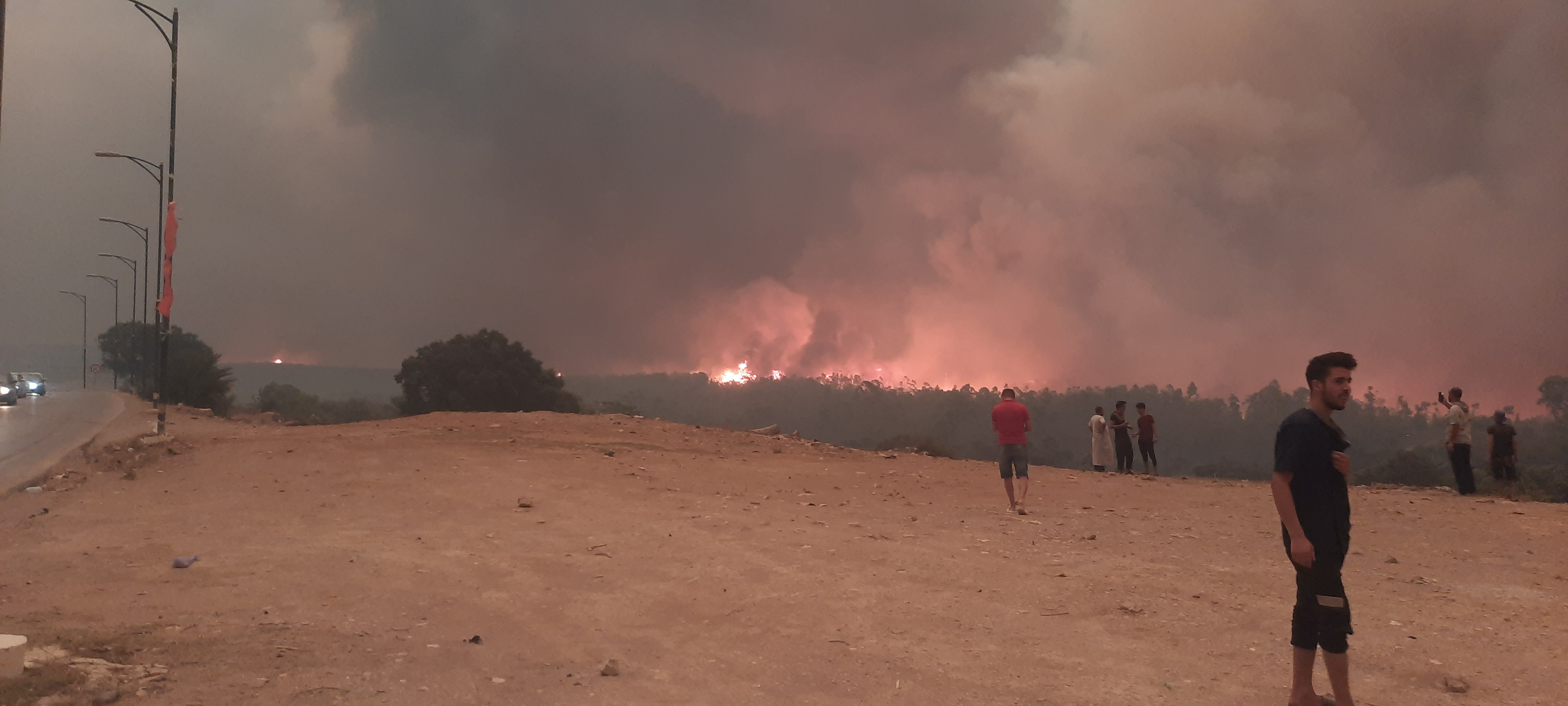
Wildfire in Algeria in August 2022.

Wildfires which broke out in August have killed at least 38 people, 24 in the city of El Taref, and injured at least 200 others. They caused 350 people to be evacuated, according to Minister of Interior Kamel Beldjoud.

=== Croatia ===
Three large wildfires in the Zadar and Šibenik area destroyed around 20 homes in the village of Raslina by Lake Prokljan. The fire was extinguished by 18 July.

=== Cyprus ===
On 23 June, a wildfire destroyed at least 10,000 acres (4,000 ha) of forest on the foothills of the Kyrenia Mountains.

=== Czech Republic ===
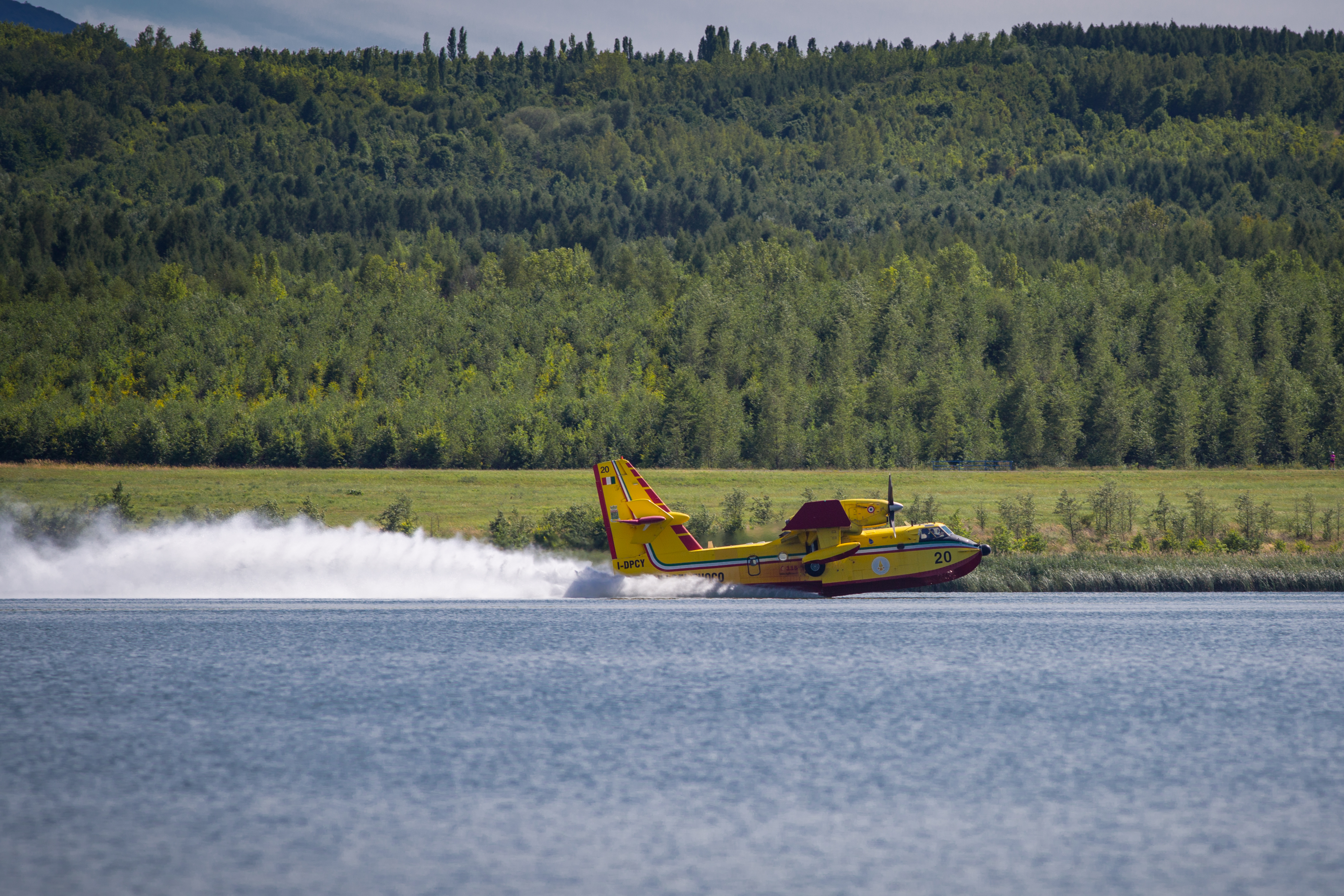
Two Italian aircraft of the Canadair CL-415 type with large-capacity 6,000 liter tanks took part in extinguishing the fire; water was collected from Lake Milada near Ústí nad Labem.

A forest fire occurred in the Bohemian Switzerland National Park on 24 July 2022. It has been burning during large heatwaves, in the difficult-to-access terrain of the Malinový důl gorge in the national park area near Hřensko. Firefighters have been working since Sunday morning, they also evacuated dozens of tourists, 60 people from the camp in Dolský mlýn and residents of the village of Mezná. Firefighters and helicopters from Poland, Slovakia, Sweden and Germany also responded to the fire.

On 26 July, the smell of smoke from a forest fire was noticed as far away as Vysočina, Prague, Ústí nad Orlicí District, Svitavy District and Dresden. As of 26 July, the fire affected 1,060 hectares (2,600 acres) of forest.

=== France ===
==== July Gironde Fires ====
In July, estimated total of more than 20,800 ha (51,000 acres) were burnt by the wildfires in Gironde, causing a total of 36,750 people to be evacuated.

The fire at La Teste-de-Buch started at around 15:00 on 12 July. The mayor of La Teste-de-Buch, Patrick Davet, said that the cause of the fire may have been a vehicle that could have had electrical problems and ignited a fire on the side of a road near the Dune of Pilat.

In the evening, authorities evacuated five hamlets and the village of Guillos near Landiras as a precautionary measure. Five hundred people were evacuated and no casualties were reported from this fire. The D115 and D125 roads were closed to traffic.

On 13 July, in the area close to the fire, an evacuation of five campsites began, with around 6,000 holidaymakers fleeing as a cautionary measure. They were sent to the exhibition centre and the Leclerc shopping centre in La Teste-de-Buch. The D218 road was cut off by the fire between Pilat and the beach at Biscarosse. No injuries were reported. At the La Teste-de-Buch fire, 445 hectares (1,100 acres) in the district of Arcachon had been burnt since 12 July. By midday, the fire in this area had increased to 700 hectares (1,700 acres).

At the Landiras fire, 800 hectares (2,000 acres) had been burnt since 12 July and no injuries were reported. The prefecture activated two operational command posts manned by the SDIS of the Gironde to coordinate operations. Nearly six hundred firefighters were engaged to fight the fire. Two Canadair water bombers were deployed and two Dash aircraft, with additional reinforcements allocated from other areas of France. By midday, the fire in this area had increased to 1,000 hectares (2,500 acres).

By the morning of 14 July, 1,750 hectares (4,300 acres) had been burnt in Arcachon near La Teste-de-Buch with no injuries reported. The fire was not under control and was difficult to access. From 5 a.m., sixty people were evacuated from an area north of Cazaux. The D218 road remained cut between the roundabout at Pilat and the beach at Biscarosse remained closed. By the early evening, 2,900 hectares (7,200 acres) had been destroyed as two houses and campsites near the lake were under threat. Further evacuations took place in the afternoon around Cazaux and 4,000 evacuees were now being housed as a reception centre at La Teste-de-Buch.

In Landiras, 2,100 hectares (5,200 acres) had burnt near Langon by the morning with no injuries reported. The fire was not under control and the D115, D125 and D220 roads were closed. Guillos and the hamlets of Lahon and Hil et Petit-Hil were evacuated and by the evening, the fire had burnt through 2,400 hectares (5,900 acres).

Nearly one thousand firefighters, four Canadairs and two Dash aircraft had been mobilised. The prefect, Fabienne Buccio placed the Gironde department on Orange alert due to the weather conditions and the risk of other forest fires.

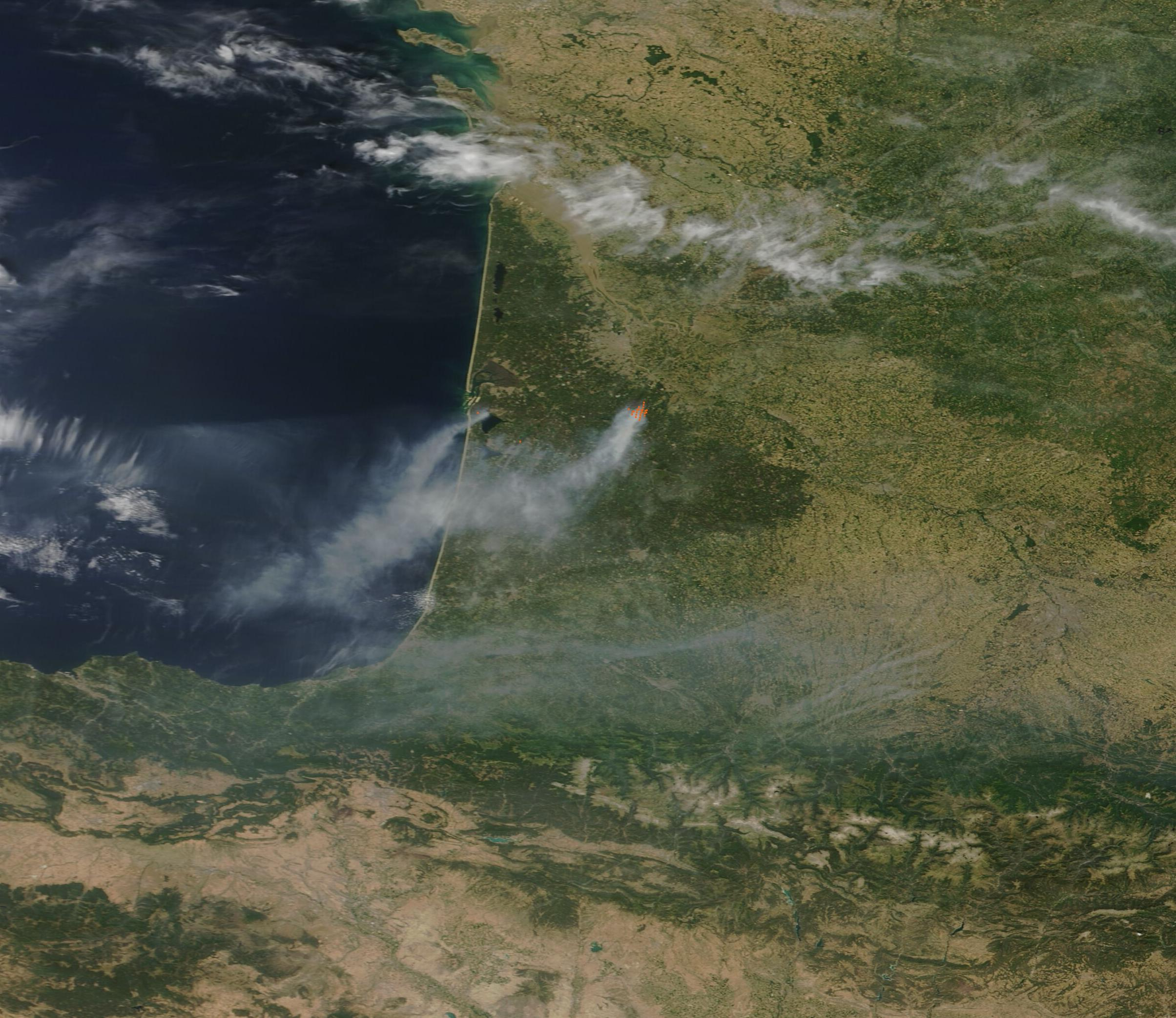
Aerial view of fires in the forests near La Teste-de-Buch and Landiras, 15 July

By the morning of 15 July, 3,150 hectares (7,800 acres) had burnt at the La Teste-de-Buch, the fire having reached the lake at Cazaux while 10,000 people had been evacuated so far. The fire was still not under control and at Cazaux three houses and two restaurants had been destroyed. Bulldozers were brought in to attempt to build firebreaks ahead of the fire. Around a thousand firefighters, three Canadairs and one Dash aircraft were being deployed to fight the fires in both areas that morning.

Evacuees from the campsites around La Teste-de-Buch, evacuated since 12 July, returned on 15 July, with individuals allowed to return to the sites to pack up their camping gear and luggage. Most inhabitants of Cazaux were not allowed back to check on their homes and pets.

4,500 hectares (11,000 acres) had been destroyed near Landiras, but increased to 4,700 hectares (12,000 acres) by the evening. Further evacuations had been carried out throughout the day at Louchats, Origne, Balizac and La Broque with around 1,900 evacuated. One house at Guillos had been destroyed and more roads closed in the fire area.

Greece and Italy made two Canadair water bombers available for France. They arrived in France that morning, being mobilised to the south of France. President Emmanuel Macron visited the Ministry of Interior's crisis centre in Paris to be briefed on the progress to fight the fire.

On 16 July, some inhabitants of Cazaux were allowed through to retrieve belongings and pets while others could not go due to the road to the town being overrun again by fire. The fire at La Teste-de-Buch fire was contained but still burning with the possibility of becoming out of control if the temperatures stayed high and the winds rise again.

The town of Cabanac-et-Villagrains was evacuated as were 1,900 people from the Hostens. At Hostens, an evacuation order was issued but residents were not obliged to leave and if they chose to stay, they had to declare that position. The amount of vegetation and forest burnt in the two fires now stood at under 10,000 hectares (25,000 acres). Two new accommodation centres were opened in Saucats and Belin-Béliet.

Aerial water bombers dropped 10,000 litres (2,200 imp gal; 2,600 US gal) of fire retardant on the fire fronts to stop the progress of the fire. It had been reported that so far only four firefighters were injured, one fire appliance overturned and one was burnt. Three thousand buildings had been saved.

President of the Gironde Departmental Council, Jean-Luc Gleyze pleaded for more Canadair and Dash aircraft on site to fight the fire as some Canadair water bombers had been moved to other areas in France. Some, he complained, had arrived too late and made containing the fire harder. He said if the fire at La Teste-de-Buch could be contained between the coast and Lac de Cazaux, then more resources could then be moved to the Landiras.

Jean-Marc Pelletant, mayor of Landiras said a team of prosecutors from Bordeaux had arrived and were investigating if there was any criminal activity responsible for the fire, a situation he was not aware of.

Satellite images showing the impact of the wildfire in Gironde between 12 and 17 July 2022.

On 17 July, the evacuation of 2,100 people in Cabanac began during the day with more than 16,000 people evacuated since 12 July. The prefecture announced at midday that around 11,000 ha (27,000 acres) had been burnt in the two fires. 1,500 firemen from all over France were fighting the fire. At the La Teste-de-Buch fire, 3,400 ha (8,400 acres) had burnt while at the Landiras fire, 7,200 ha (18,000 acres) had been lost. The fire at Landiras was said to have a perimeter of 12 km (7.5 mi) by 6 km (3.7 mi) with several fire heads.

Midday at the La-Teste-de-Buch fire, saw the construction of firebreaks continued with the fire fought on left and right flanks to protect campsites and dwellings. During the day at the Landiras fire, the DFCI (Défense des Forêts Contre les Incendies) continued to build firebreaks in front of the fire. By evening, 3,900 ha (9,600 acres) had burnt at La-Teste-de-Buch and 9,000 ha (22,000 acres) at Landiras after the fire situation deteriorated during the afternoon, with fire at the former having reached the ocean at Banc d'Arguin and turned south. And at Landiras, the fire had several fronts when the wind changed. Resources to fight the fire had been increased but were still to deploy with an additional three aircraft, two hundred firefighters and eleven more fire appliances allocated. In the Landiras region, two new shelters were opened in Langon while one was closed at Saucats.

On 18 July, in the La Teste-de-Buch and Landiras areas, more than 16,000 people were evacuated as fires continue to spread across Gironde.

The wildfire plume from Gironde also traveled hundreds of kilometers, reaching the Île-de-France region by the late afternoon of July 19.

In Brasparts, Monts d'Arrée, Finistère, a large moorland fire started, forcing the evacuation of 300 people while more than 1700 hectares burned. It was caused by two distinct fires a few kilometers apart, both of human origin, one obviously criminal according to Quimper prosecutor Carine Halley.

==== August Gironde Fires ====
As of 12 August 2022, more than 1,000 firefighters were fighting a megafire in Gironde, which has destroyed about 7,400 ha (18,000 acres) of forest and forced 10,000 residents to flee. Firefighters from Poland, Romania, Austria and Germany and helicopters from Greece, Italy and Sweden helped extinguish the fires.

=== Germany ===
On 25 July, a forest fire covering an area of 800 ha (2,000 acres) led to the evacuation of 700 people in the villages of Rehfeld and Kölsa in the state of Brandenburg. Seven firefighters suffered injuries.

Wildfires in the Czech Republic crossed the border to the Saxon Switzerland on 25 July 2022 with fires near Großer Winterberg and Kirnitzschtal.

On 4 August, a fire broke out at an explosives disposal site in Grunewald, a forest in Berlin. Due to the fire, the Bundesautobahn 115, a highway located approximately 500 m (1,600 ft) from the explosives disposal site, remained closed for all traffic until the evening of 10 August, when it was confirmed that the safety of travellers would not be compromised by any remaining explosives inside the forest.

=== Greece ===
Wildfires broke out on 14 July, affecting areas near Preveza. Seven villages near Rethymno were evacuated because of fires.

On 19 July, a wildfire broke out near the Pantokratoros Monastery. The villages of Drafi and Pallini were evacuated.

=== Italy ===
A wildfire broke out on 15 July in a corn field in Bibione, San Michele al Tagliamento.
On the evening of 18 July a large fire breaks out in Massarosa (Province of Lucca), which in 5 days has destroyed beyond 900 hectares (at 22 July) until it reaches the Province of Pisa.

=== Lebanon ===
On 9 July, a large wildfire engulfed a pine forest near Nabatieh.

=== Malta ===
On 18 July, a wildfire broke out in grassland in Mriehel.

=== Morocco ===
In July 2022, at the same time as wildfires across Europe, Morocco was affected by large wildfires as a result of historic heatwaves. The Royal Moroccan Armed Forces and firefighters have struggled to get the situation under control. The forests of Taza, Tetouan and Larache have been burning. 500 families were evacuated from the provinces of Larache and Taza. 1,331 families were evacuated from 20 villages, and around 170 houses were destroyed south of the port of Tangier.

One person was killed during the fires, and 1,500 ha (3,700 acres) of forest have been destroyed.

=== Portugal ===
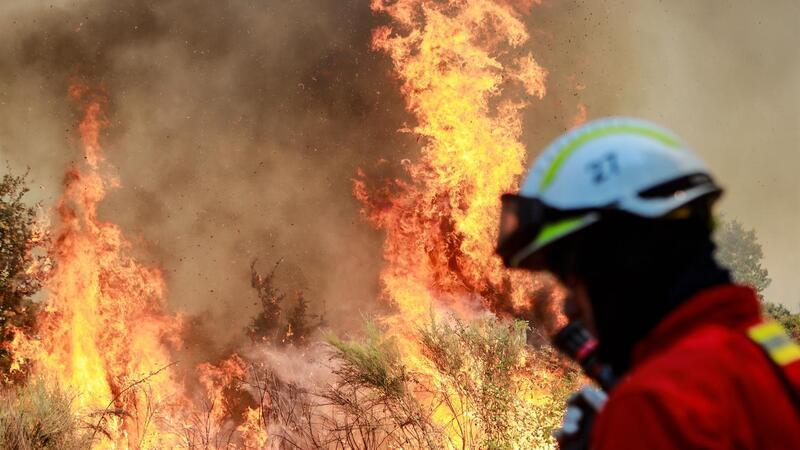
Fire in Ourém.

The Algarve region and the districts of Leiria and Santarém have been most affected by wildfires. One fireplane pilot was killed when the plane crashed. In July, a total of 30,000 hectares (74,000 acres) were burnt by wildfires. In Leiria, a fire blocked a part of the A1 which runs from Porto to Lisbon. In Algarve, a fire broke out in the city of Faro, which spread to the Quinta do Lago resort. A fire in the municipality of Palmela in the Lisbon metropolitan area burned 400 hectares (990 acres) of bush and caused 12 injuries. According to the Civil Protection Authority, at least 135 people have been injured since wildfires began, and about 800 people have been evacuated from their homes.

On 31 July, firefighters battled a large wildfire in the municipality of Mafra near the town of Venda do Pinheiro.

On 21 August, a wildfire broke out in the Vila Real District. A fire tornado was filmed in the area.

=== Romania ===
On 5 July, a wildfire destroyed 100 hectares of a wheat field in Timiș County.

=== Slovenia ===
On 17 July, wildfires broke out in the Karst region on the Italy–Slovenia border and more than 300 firefighters were battling the flames. The Karst wildfires continued to spread until 20 July, causing evacuations of a number of villages. There were several foreign aircraft that assisted the domestic ones in battling the flames and monitoring the affected areas. Approximately 1,900 ha (4,700 acres) of land were burnt, making it the most extensive spread of wildfires ever recorded in Slovenia. On 22 July, when the Karst wildfires started to spread again, there were more than 800 firefighters and 260 foresters on location.

In the early morning of 24 July, there were rain showers in the Karst region, but precipitation only occurred in part of the areas affected by the Karst wildfires, which continued to burn due to strong winds and high temperatures. By the end of the day, approximately 2,000 people and several domestic as well as foreign aircraft succeeded in stopping these wildfires from spreading further. On 25 July, they were confirmed to be under control, but not yet fully extinguished, after burning an estimated 3,500 ha (8,600 acres) of land in the municipalities of Miren–Kostanjevica and Renče–Vogrsko. At that time, many of the people who fought the flames the previous day already left the affected areas and all foreign aircraft returned to their home countries. As strong winds and slow-burning flames could still start a new spread, a total of 518 people, including approximately 325 firefighters, kept monitoring the situation in the most critical parts of the affected areas.

Although there were periods of rain in the Karst region on 26 July, precipitation in the areas affected by the Karst wildfires was low. As it was assessed that strong winds could still contribute to flames igniting in natural environments, a total of 143 firefighters remained on location during the day and their number was reduced to 58 during the night. In the early morning of 27 July, a wildfire broke out at a previously unaffected location in the municipality of Komen, but it was soon put under control by a total of 180 firefighters and only an estimated 20 ha (49 acres) of land were burnt. A number of smaller fires also broke out in the previously affected areas as firefighters and helicopter crews continued to monitor the situation. In the days that followed, they only reported minor fires that burned without spreading and did not register any significant changes on the Slovenian side of the border. However, a new wildfire started to spread on the Italian side of the border on 28 July, which caused up to 60 Slovenian firefighters and one helicopter to relocate there and assist in the efforts to put it under control. After new periods of rain in the Karst region on 30 July, the Karst wildfires were under control on both sides of the border. However, they were not yet considered fully extinguished and the affected areas on the Slovenian side of the border were monitored by up to 60 firefighters.

On 1 August, it was announced that 10 firefighters would continue to monitor these affected areas as long as it would be assessed that flames could ignite in natural environments. The estimation in regard to the land area affected by the Karst wildfires on the Slovenian side of the border was updated to 3,600 ha (8,900 acres) that day, of which approximately 82% were in the municipality of Miren–Kostanjevica. The blazes mostly affected forests and grasslands, but also olive groves and vineyards. They destroyed a mountain hut and several small agricultural buildings, but did not cause any damage to residential buildings and only around 60 cases of minor injuries were recorded. On 3 August, it was reported that the areas affected by the Karst wildfires on the Slovenian side of the border would be cleared of burnt wood within three weeks.

On 1 August, a wildfire broke out on a hill in the vicinity of Lake Bled, a popular tourist destination, affecting a forest and burning above a railway tunnel, but it was extinguished within hours.

On 9 August, a wildfire broke out in a previously unaffected area on the Italy–Slovenia border, burning in a shrubland in the hills near Socerb in the municipality of Koper, further south from the areas affected by the July wildfires in the Karst region. After the blaze was noticed during the night, approximately 80 firefighters and two helicopters were activated to stop its spread. It was thought to be under control by noon, but it started spreading again during the afternoon, when approximately 120 firefighters and several aircraft from both sides of the border were battling the flames. In the evening, the wildfire was reported to be under control, but the location was still closely monitored due to the blowing of the bora. On the morning of 11 August, it was reported that the wildfire was extinguished. The affected area, which encompassed an estimated 100 ha (250 acres) of land, was watered and monitored by approximately 150 firefighters and several aircraft the previous day.

On 10 August, there were three smaller forest fires near Radovljica, which were extinguished within hours. They broke out next to a railway and were confirmed to have been caused by the braking of a train.

In the early afternoon of 17 August, a forest fire broke out in the hills near Zalog, a neighbourhood on the outskirts of the capital Ljubljana. Two helicopters and more than 110 firefighters were activated to stop its spread. As the night fell, around 60 firefighters stayed on location and successfully put the blaze under control. The area it affected is accessible only by foot and no residential buildings were in danger.

On 19 August, a warning of heightened risk of fires breaking out in natural environments, which was issued for several municipalities on 20 July, was lifted in the municipalities of Miren–Kostanjevica, Renče–Vogrsko and Komen, which were affected by the July wildfires in the Karst region, as well as in the municipality of Koper, which was affected by the wildfire near Socerb earlier in August.

On 6 September, the ARSO confirmed that a total of 4,388 ha (10,840 acres) of land were burnt by wildfires in Slovenia in 2022.

=== Spain ===
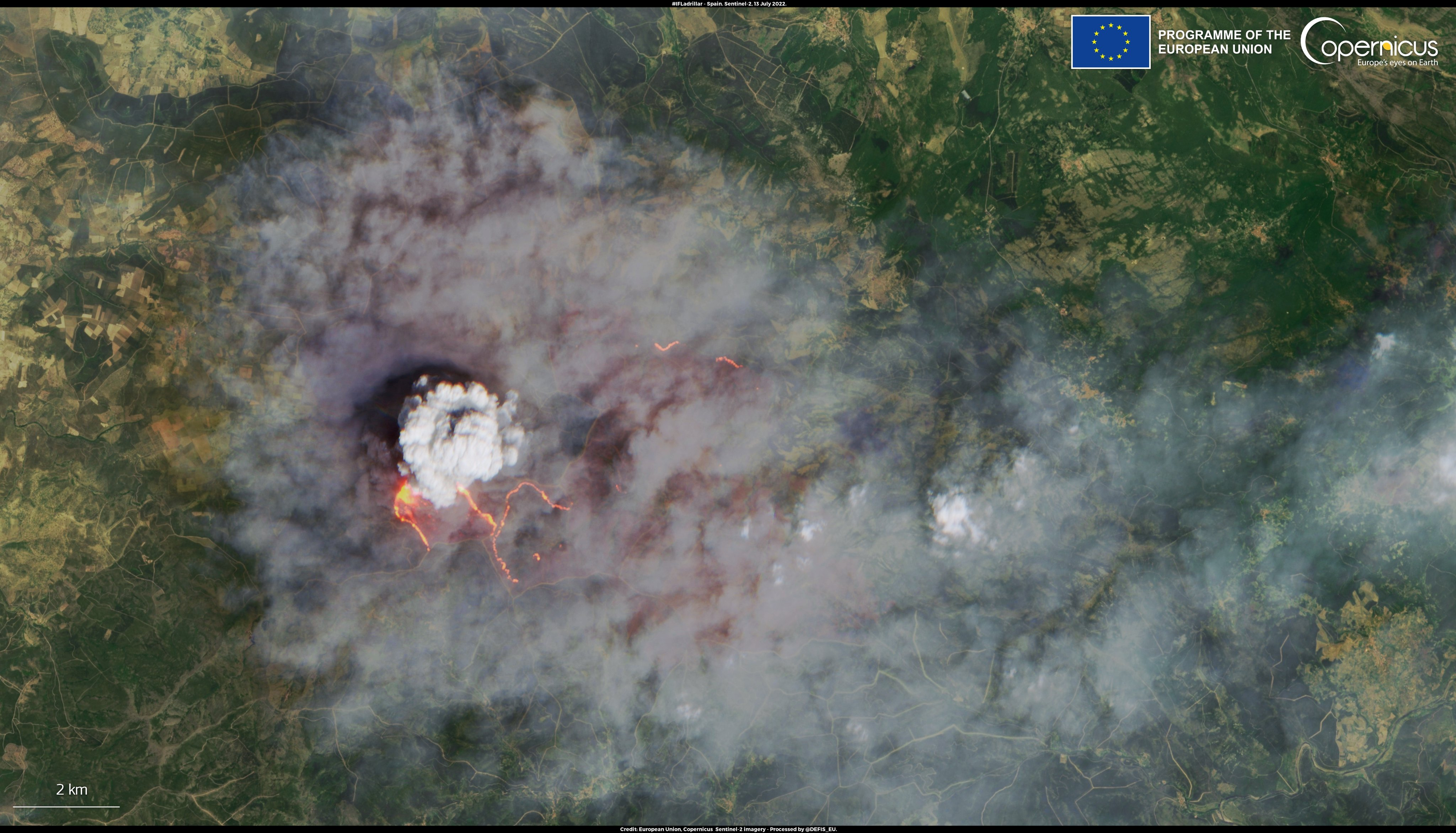
Pyrocumulus clouds over the wildfire near Salamanca, 13 July

Wildfires broke out in the Sierra de Mijas mountains, which forced 2,300 to flee near the Costa del Sol. In July, Extremadura experienced wildfires which spread to Salamanca in Castile and León and burnt more than 4,000 hectares (9,900 acres).

In Aragon, on 18 July, a fire started in Ateca, burning 14,000 hectares. On 13 August another fire starts, in the Moncayo Range, burning 6,000 hectares. On 14 August, more than 1,500 people were evacuated from Zaragoza, Spain, due to wildfires.

=== Tunisia ===
On 19 June, a wildfire broke out in Jebel Boukornine near the capital Tunis.

=== Turkey ===
On 24 June, a wildfire raged in the Bördübet region, near Marmaris on the Aegean Sea coast. On 13 July, a wildfire broke out on the Datça Peninsula. 450 houses and 3,530 people were evacuated from the area.

=== United Kingdom ===
There were nearly 25,000 wildfires across the United Kingdom.

== See also ==
- 2024 Portugal wildfires
- 2022 European heat waves
- 2022 United Kingdom heat waves
- Climate change in Europe
- Climate change in the Middle East and North Africa
