= Gat mort =

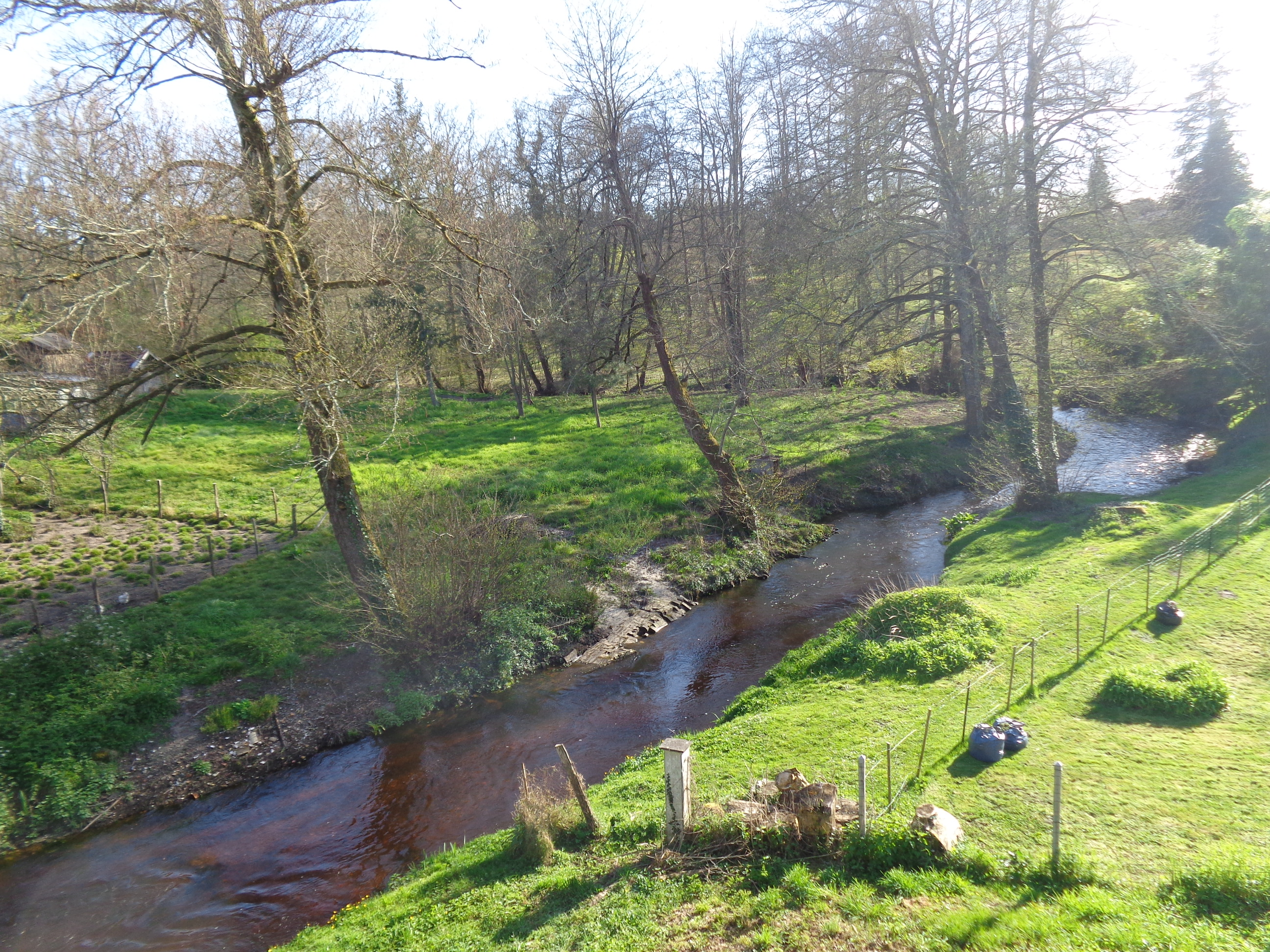

- Location within France Location within Nouvelle-Aquitaine

Physical characteristics
- Source
  - location: Hostens
  - coordinates: 44°29′20″N 0°36′35″W
  - elevation: 77 m (253 ft)
- Mouth
  - location: Garonne
  - coordinates: 44°42′14″N 0°26′18″W
  - elevation: 5 m (16 ft)
- Length: 37 km (23 mi)

Basin features
- Progression: Garonne→ Gironde estuary→ Atlantic Ocean

Gat mort is a left tributary of the Garonne, in southwest France. It is 37 km (23 mi) long.

== Geography ==
Gat mort rises in the Landes de Gascogne Regional Natural Park, in the commune of Hostens, generally drains in a north-easterly direction through the Graves wine-growing region and flows into the Garonne as a left tributary after about 37 km (23 mi) at the municipal boundary of Beautiran and Castres-Gironde.

== Department and towns ==
Gat mort flows through the following department and towns:

- Gironde (33) : Hostens, Saint-Magne, Louchats, Cabanac-et-Villagrains, Saint-Morillon, Saint-Selve, Castres-Gironde, Beautiran.
