= Pujols-sur-Ciron =

- Commune
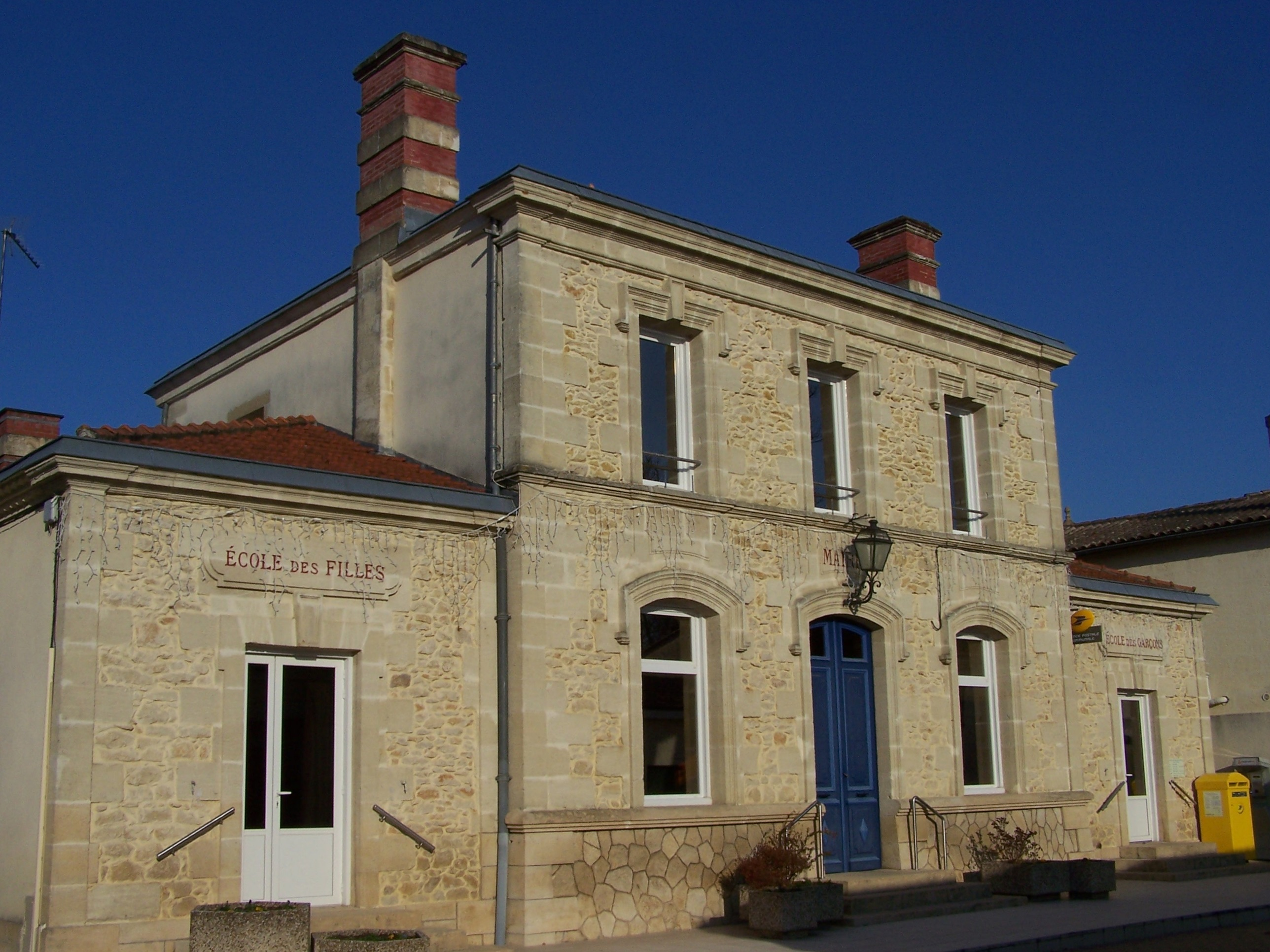
- Town hall

- Coat of arms
- Location of Pujols-sur-Ciron
- Location within France Location within Nouvelle-Aquitaine
- Coordinates: 44°33′46″N 0°21′11″W
- Country: France
- Region: Nouvelle-Aquitaine
- Department: Gironde
- Arrondissement: Langon
- Canton: Les Landes des Graves
- Intercommunality: Convergence Garonne

Government
  - Mayor (2020–2026): Dominique Clavier
- Area^{1}: 7.53 km^{2} (2.91 sq mi)
- Elevation: 21 m (69 ft)
- Highest elevation: 24 m (79 ft)
- Lowest elevation: 8 m (26 ft)
- Population (2023): 945
  - Density: 125/km^{2} (325/sq mi)
- Time zone: UTC+01:00 (CET)
  - Summer (DST): UTC+02:00 (CEST)
- INSEE/Postal code: 33343 /33210
- ^{1} French Land Register data, which excludes lakes, ponds, glaciers > 1 km^{2} (0.386 sq mi or 247 acres) and river estuaries.

Pujols-sur-Ciron (French pronunciation: [pyʒɔl syʁ siʁɔ̃], literally Pujols on Ciron; Occitan: Pujòus de Siron) is a commune in the Gironde department in Nouvelle-Aquitaine in southwestern France.

== Population ==
Historical population
Year	Pop.	±% p.a.
1968	550	—
1975	419	−3.81%
1982	575	+4.63%
1990	649	+1.52%
1999	722	+1.19%
2007	717	−0.09%
2012	779	+1.67%
2017	780	+0.03%
2023	945	+3.25%
Source: INSEE

== See also ==
- Communes of the Gironde department
