= Saint-Symphorien, Gironde =

Commune in southwestern France

Saint-Symphorien
- Commune
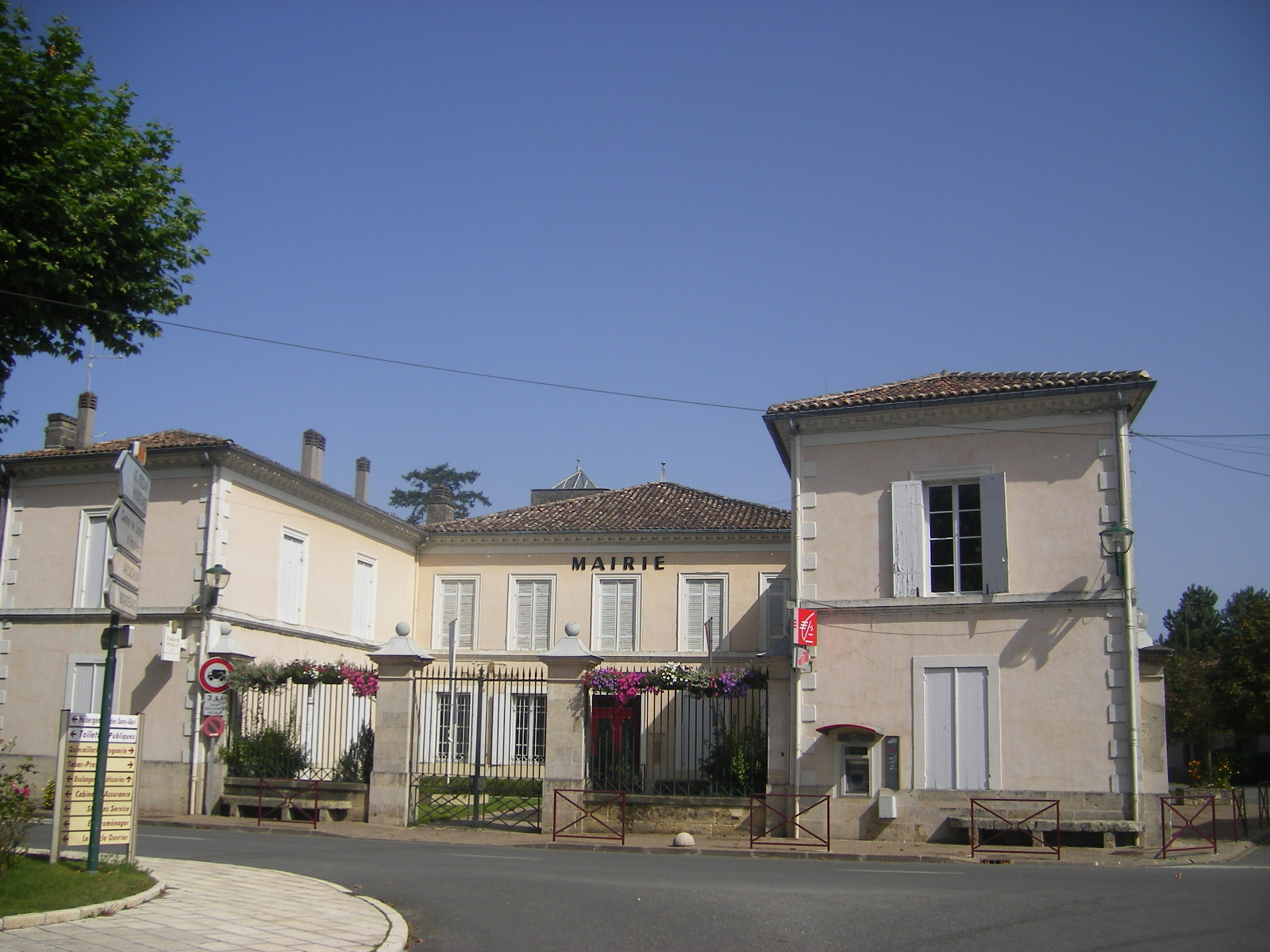
- Town hall

- Coat of arms
- Location of Saint-Symphorien
- Location within France Location within Nouvelle-Aquitaine
- Coordinates: 44°25′45″N 0°29′20″W
- Country: France
- Region: Nouvelle-Aquitaine
- Department: Gironde
- Arrondissement: Langon
- Canton: Les Landes des Graves

Government
  - Mayor (2020–2026): Bruno Gardère
- Area^{1}: 106.29 km^{2} (41.04 sq mi)
- Elevation: 52 m (171 ft)
- Highest elevation: 86 m (282 ft)
- Lowest elevation: 45 m (148 ft)
- Population (2023): 1,878
  - Density: 17.67/km^{2} (45.76/sq mi)
- Time zone: UTC+01:00 (CET)
  - Summer (DST): UTC+02:00 (CEST)
- INSEE/Postal code: 33484 /33113
- ^{1} French Land Register data, which excludes lakes, ponds, glaciers > 1 km^{2} (0.386 sq mi or 247 acres) and river estuaries.

Saint-Symphorien (French pronunciation: [sɛ̃ sɛ̃fɔʁjɛ̃]; Occitan: Sent Sefrian) is a commune in the Gironde department in Nouvelle-Aquitaine in southwestern France.

== Population ==
Historical population
Year	Pop.	±% p.a.
1968	1,385	—
1975	1,385	+0.00%
1982	1,414	+0.30%
1990	1,396	−0.16%
1999	1,398	+0.02%
2007	1,594	+1.65%
2012	1,783	+2.27%
2017	1,837	+0.60%
2023	1,878	+0.37%
Source: INSEE

== See also ==
- Communes of the Gironde department
- Parc naturel régional des Landes de Gascogne
