= Saint-Michel-de-Rieufret =

- Commune
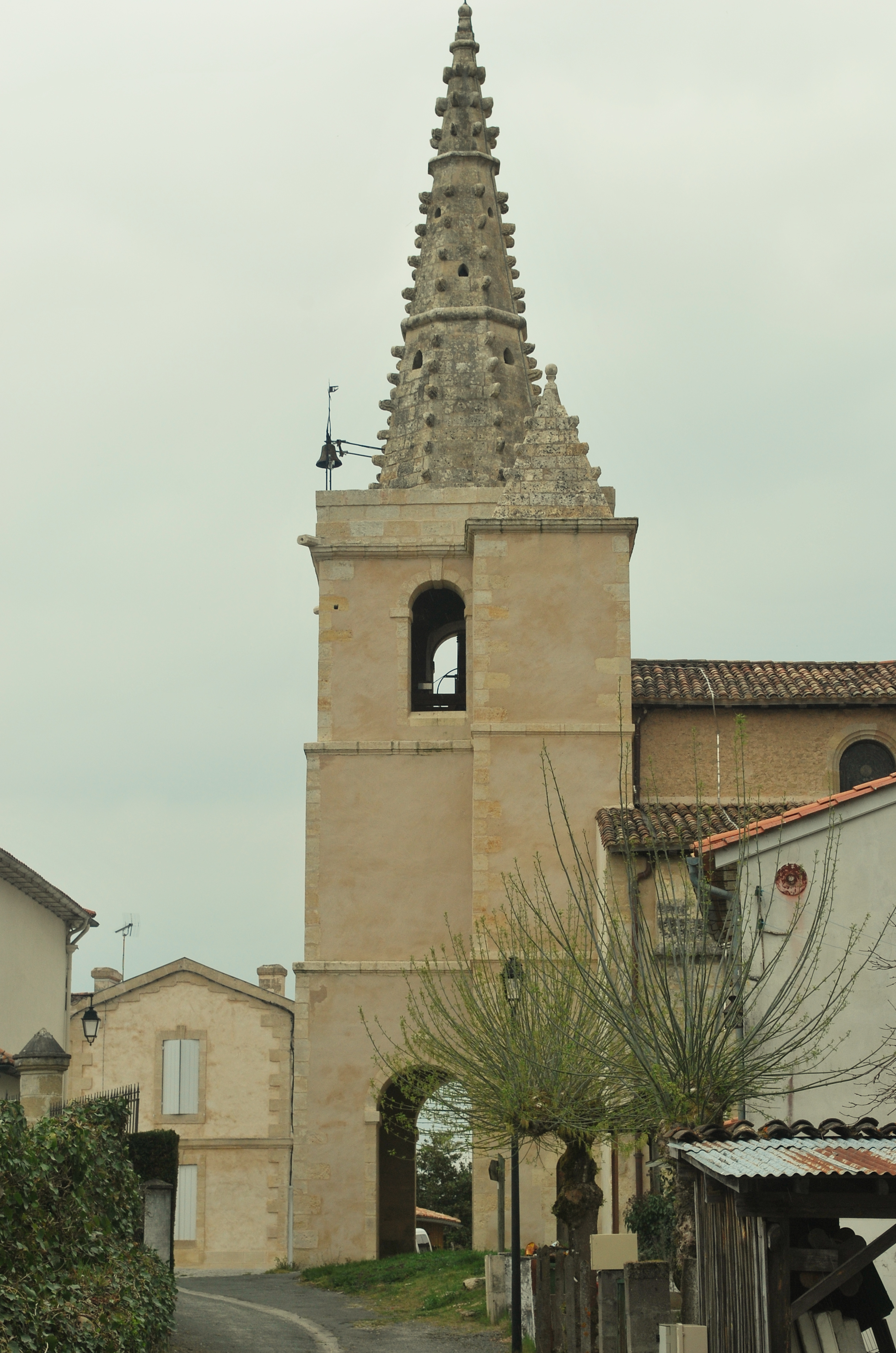
- The church in Saint-Michel-de-Rieufret
- Location of Saint-Michel-de-Rieufret
- Location within France Location within Nouvelle-Aquitaine
- Coordinates: 44°37′22″N 0°25′51″W
- Country: France
- Region: Nouvelle-Aquitaine
- Department: Gironde
- Arrondissement: Langon
- Canton: Les Landes des Graves
- Intercommunality: Convergence Garonne

Government
  - Mayor (2020–2026): Jean-Bernard Papin
- Area^{1}: 18.94 km^{2} (7.31 sq mi)
- Elevation: 34 m (112 ft)
- Highest elevation: 66 m (217 ft)
- Lowest elevation: 19 m (62 ft)
- Population (2023): 868
  - Density: 45.8/km^{2} (119/sq mi)
- Time zone: UTC+01:00 (CET)
  - Summer (DST): UTC+02:00 (CEST)
- INSEE/Postal code: 33452 /33720
- ^{1} French Land Register data, which excludes lakes, ponds, glaciers > 1 km^{2} (0.386 sq mi or 247 acres) and river estuaries.

Saint-Michel-de-Rieufret (French pronunciation: [sɛ̃ miʃɛl də ʁjøfʁɛ]; Occitan: Sent Miquèu de Riufred) is a commune in the Gironde department in Nouvelle-Aquitaine in southwestern France.

== Population ==
Historical population
Year	Pop.	±% p.a.
1968	141	—
1975	153	+1.17%
1982	278	+8.91%
1990	471	+6.81%
1999	498	+0.62%
2007	520	+0.54%
2012	558	+1.42%
2017	781	+6.96%
2023	868	+1.78%
Source: INSEE

== See also ==
- Communes of the Gironde department
