= Sore, Landes =

Sore
- Commune
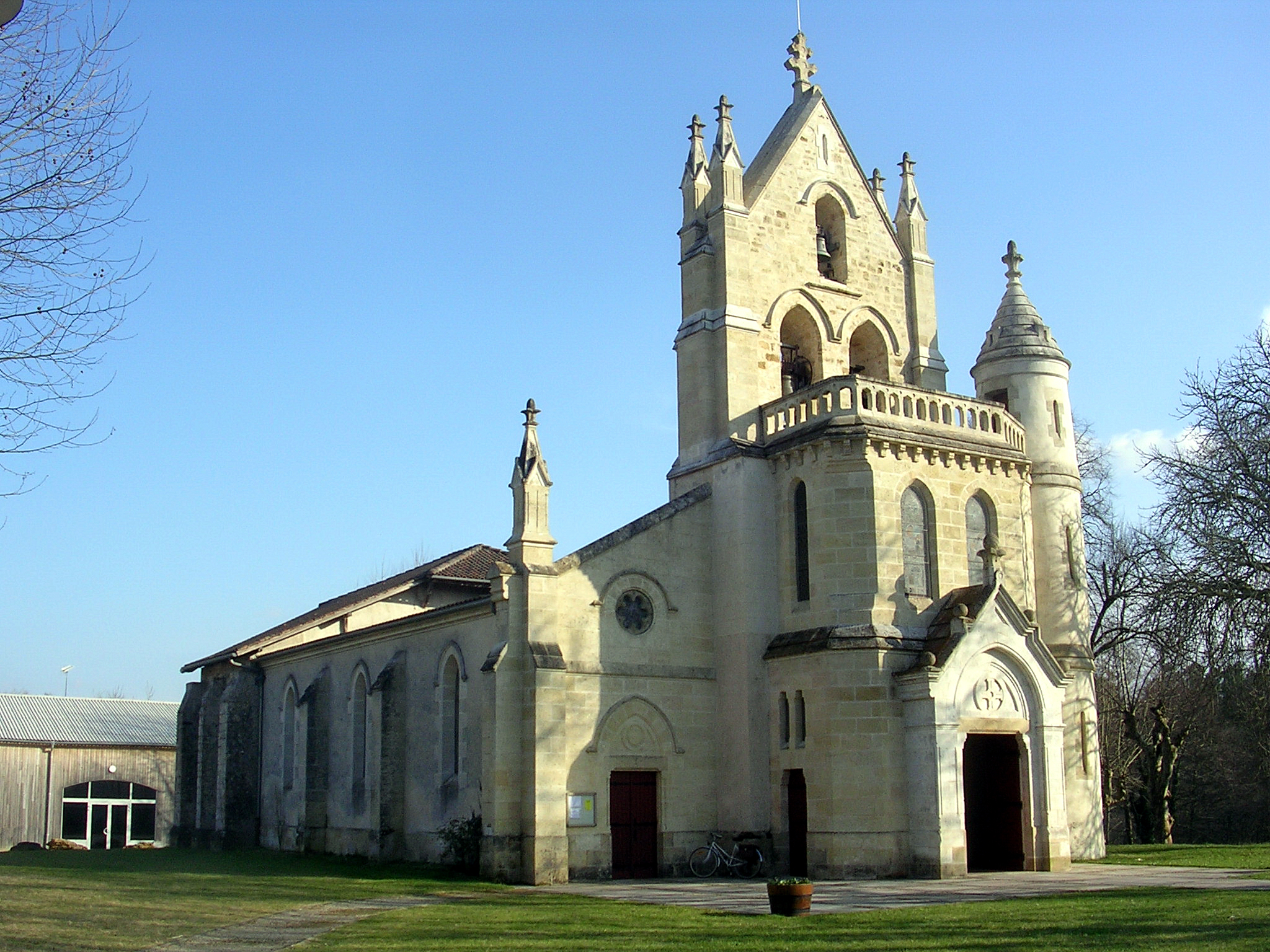
- Location of Sore
- Location within France Location within Nouvelle-Aquitaine
- Coordinates: 44°19′28″N 0°34′48″W
- Country: France
- Region: Nouvelle-Aquitaine
- Department: Landes
- Arrondissement: Mont-de-Marsan
- Canton: Haute Lande Armagnac

Government
  - Mayor (2020–2026): Vincent Gelley
- Area^{1}: 147.72 km^{2} (57.04 sq mi)
- Elevation: 73 m (240 ft)
- Highest elevation: 99 m (325 ft)
- Lowest elevation: 45 m (148 ft)
- Population (2023): 1,179
  - Density: 7.981/km^{2} (20.67/sq mi)
- Time zone: UTC+01:00 (CET)
  - Summer (DST): UTC+02:00 (CEST)
- INSEE/Postal code: 40307 /40430
- ^{1} French Land Register data, which excludes lakes, ponds, glaciers > 1 km^{2} (0.386 sq mi or 247 acres) and river estuaries.

Sore (French pronunciation: [sɔʁ]; Occitan: Sòra) is a commune in the Landes department in Nouvelle-Aquitaine in southwestern France. It is in the middle of the Landes de Gascogne Regional Natural Park. Sore is about 65 km south of Bordeaux and about 50 km inland east of the Atlantic coast.

== Population ==
Historical population
Year	Pop.	±% p.a.
1968	933	—
1975	918	−0.23%
1982	843	−1.21%
1990	883	+0.58%
1999	898	+0.19%
2007	995	+1.29%
2012	1,061	+1.29%
2017	1,122	+1.12%
2023	1,179	+0.83%
Source: INSEE

== See also ==
- Communes of the Landes department
- Parc naturel régional des Landes de Gascogne
