= Le Tuzan =

- Commune
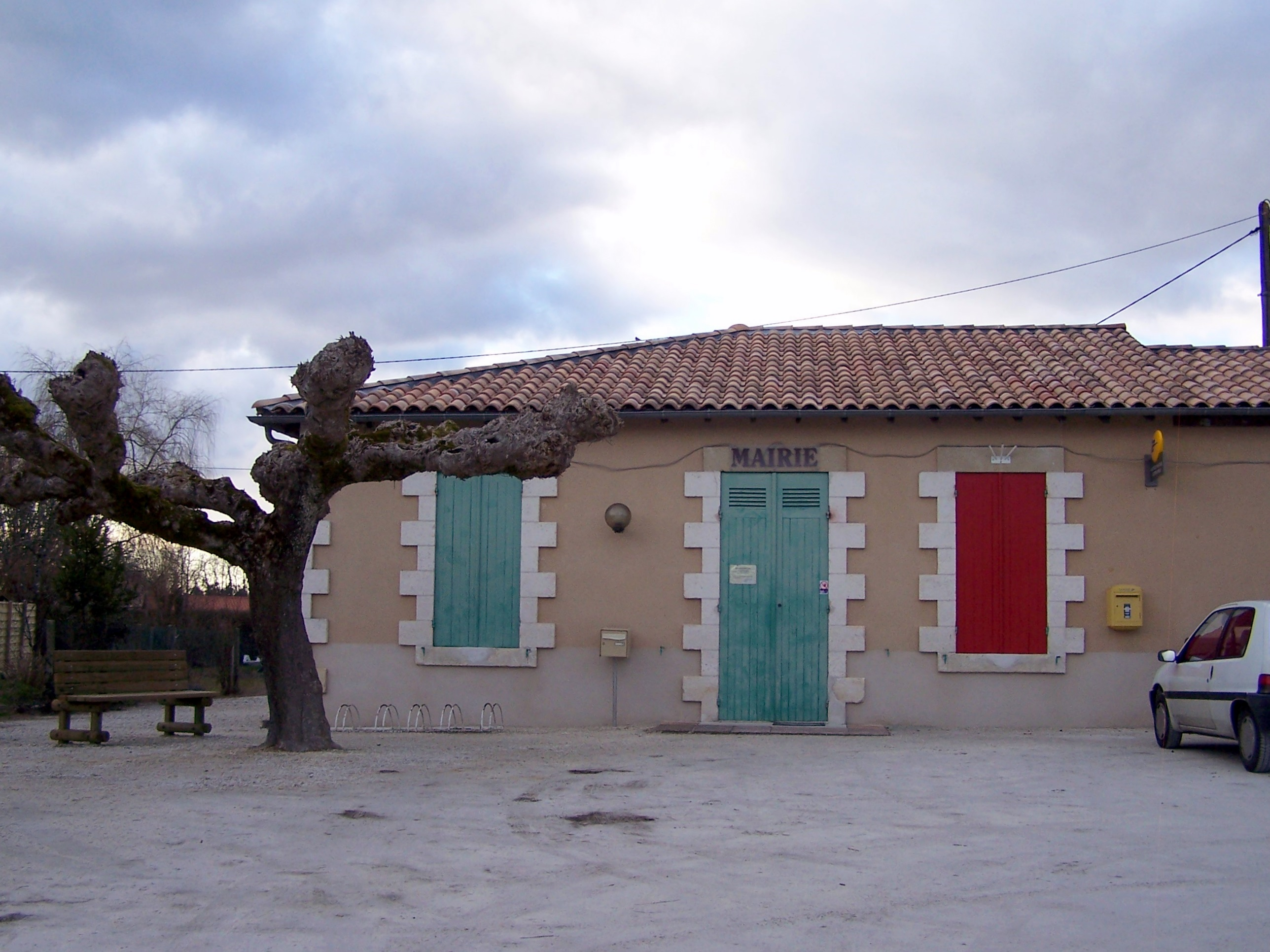
- The town hall in Le Tuzan
- Location of Le Tuzan
- Location within France Location within Nouvelle-Aquitaine
- Coordinates: 44°27′02″N 0°34′30″W
- Country: France
- Region: Nouvelle-Aquitaine
- Department: Gironde
- Arrondissement: Langon
- Canton: Les Landes des Graves

Government
  - Mayor (2020–2026): Christiane Benich
- Area^{1}: 18 km^{2} (6.9 sq mi)
- Elevation: 85 m (279 ft)
- Highest elevation: 87 m (285 ft)
- Lowest elevation: 66 m (217 ft)
- Population (2023): 263
  - Density: 15/km^{2} (38/sq mi)
- Time zone: UTC+01:00 (CET)
  - Summer (DST): UTC+02:00 (CEST)
- INSEE/Postal code: 33536 /33125
- ^{1} French Land Register data, which excludes lakes, ponds, glaciers > 1 km^{2} (0.386 sq mi or 247 acres) and river estuaries.

Le Tuzan (French pronunciation: [lə tyzɑ̃]; Gascon: Lo Tusan) is a commune in the Gironde department in Nouvelle-Aquitaine in southwestern France.

== Population ==
Historical population
Year	Pop.	±% p.a.
1968	116	—
1975	127	+1.30%
1982	127	+0.00%
1990	153	+2.36%
1999	161	+0.57%
2007	201	+2.81%
2012	241	+3.70%
2017	278	+2.90%
2023	263	−0.92%
Source: INSEE

== See also ==
- Communes of the Gironde department
- Parc naturel régional des Landes de Gascogne
