= Saint-Léger-de-Balson =

- Commune
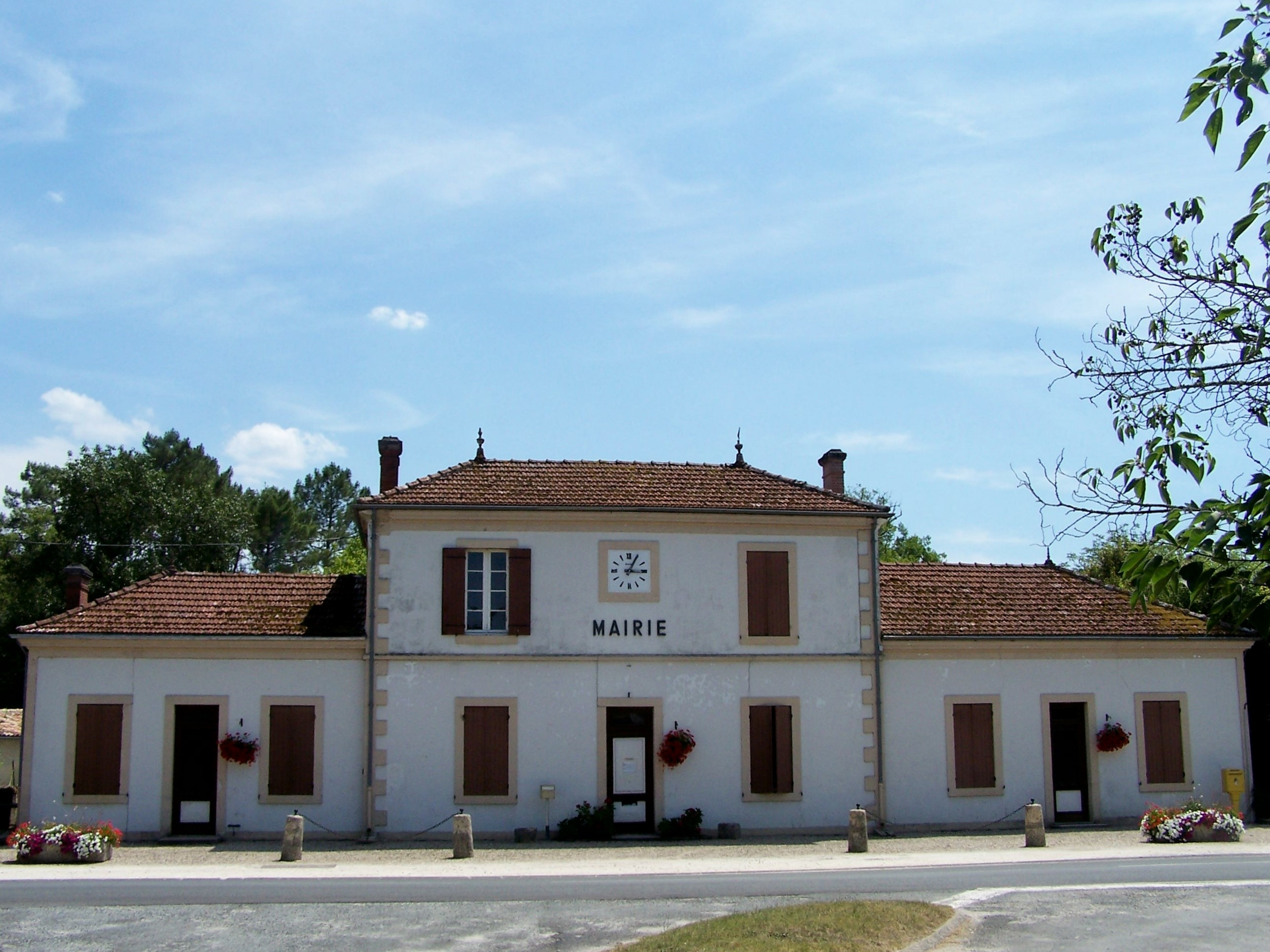
- Town hall

- Coat of arms
- Location of Saint-Léger-de-Balson
- Location within France Location within Nouvelle-Aquitaine
- Coordinates: 44°25′58″N 0°27′53″W
- Country: France
- Region: Nouvelle-Aquitaine
- Department: Gironde
- Arrondissement: Langon
- Canton: Les Landes des Graves

Government
  - Mayor (2020–2026): Laëtitia Rodriguez
- Area^{1}: 38.04 km^{2} (14.69 sq mi)
- Elevation: 52 m (171 ft)
- Highest elevation: 71 m (233 ft)
- Lowest elevation: 27 m (89 ft)
- Population (2023): 328
  - Density: 8.62/km^{2} (22.3/sq mi)
- Time zone: UTC+01:00 (CET)
  - Summer (DST): UTC+02:00 (CEST)
- INSEE/Postal code: 33429 /33113
- ^{1} French Land Register data, which excludes lakes, ponds, glaciers > 1 km^{2} (0.386 sq mi or 247 acres) and river estuaries.

Saint-Léger-de-Balson (French pronunciation: [sɛ̃ leʒe də balsɔ̃]; Gascon: Sent Lugèir de Balion) is a commune in the Gironde department in Nouvelle-Aquitaine in southwestern France.

== Population ==
Historical population
Year	Pop.	±% p.a.
1968	217	—
1975	214	−0.20%
1982	227	+0.85%
1990	239	+0.65%
1999	243	+0.18%
2007	287	+2.10%
2012	332	+2.96%
2017	337	+0.30%
2023	328	−0.45%
Source: INSEE

== See also ==
- Communes of the Gironde department
- Parc naturel régional des Landes de Gascogne
