= Luxey =

- Commune
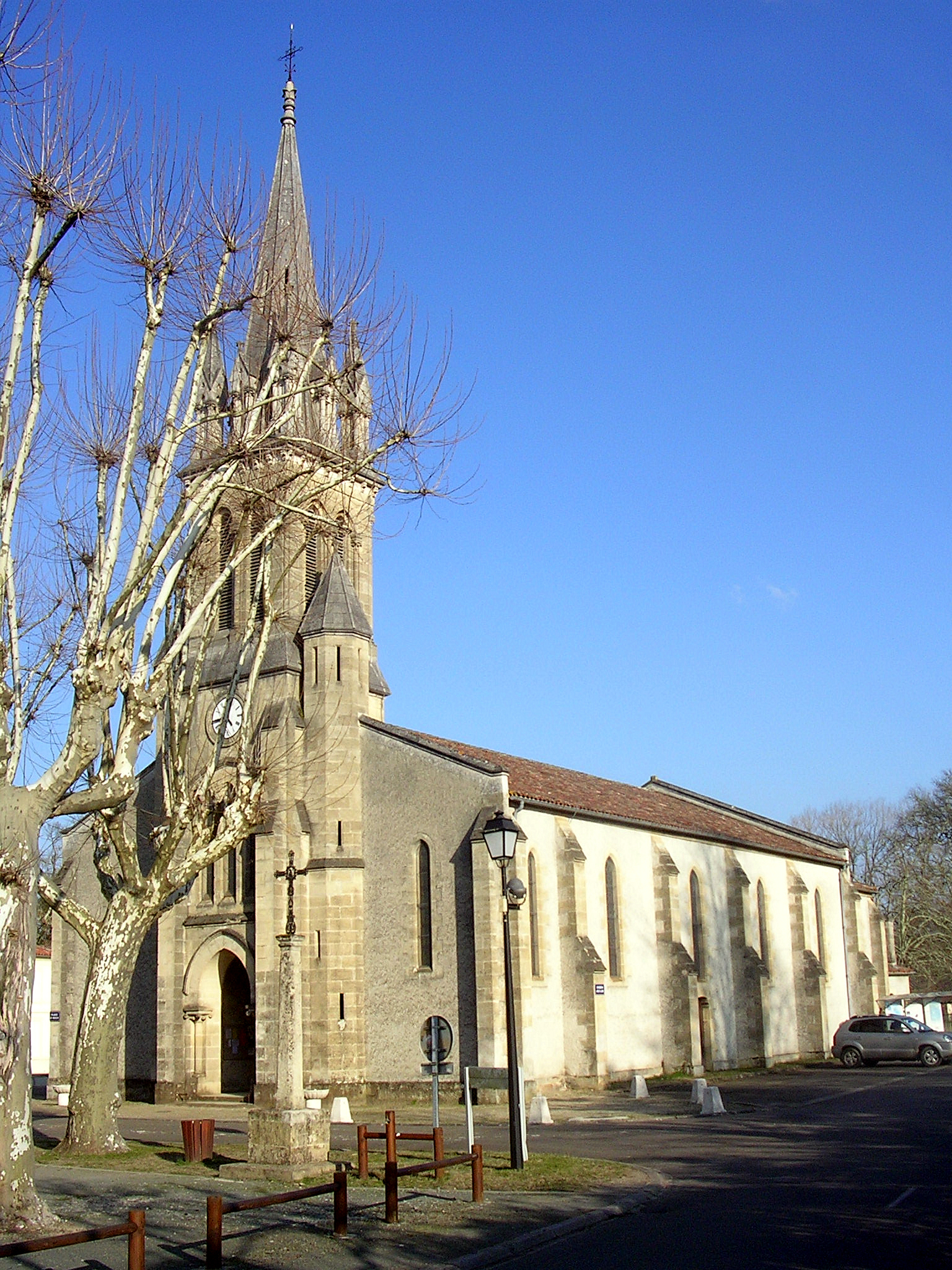
- Church at Luxey
- Location of Luxey
- Location within France Location within Nouvelle-Aquitaine
- Coordinates: 44°15′52″N 0°31′06″W
- Country: France
- Region: Nouvelle-Aquitaine
- Department: Landes
- Arrondissement: Mont-de-Marsan
- Canton: Haute Lande Armagnac
- Intercommunality: Cœur Haute Lande

Government
  - Mayor (2020–2026): Serge Sore
- Area^{1}: 160.07 km^{2} (61.80 sq mi)
- Elevation: 87 m (285 ft)
- Highest elevation: 121 m (397 ft)
- Lowest elevation: 62 m (203 ft)
- Population (2023): 654
  - Density: 4.09/km^{2} (10.6/sq mi)
- Demonym(s): Luxois, Luxoise
- Time zone: UTC+01:00 (CET)
  - Summer (DST): UTC+02:00 (CEST)
- INSEE/Postal code: 40167 /40430
- ^{1} French Land Register data, which excludes lakes, ponds, glaciers > 1 km^{2} (0.386 sq mi or 247 acres) and river estuaries.

Luxey (French pronunciation: [lyksɛ]; Occitan: Lucsèir) is a commune in the Landes department, Nouvelle-Aquitaine, Southwestern France.

== See also ==
- Communes of the Landes department
- Parc naturel régional des Landes de Gascogne
