= Venda do Pinheiro =

Coordinates: 38°55′25″N 9°13′56″W

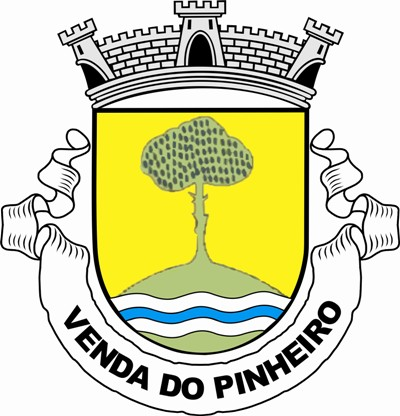
Former parish coat of arms. (???? — 2013)

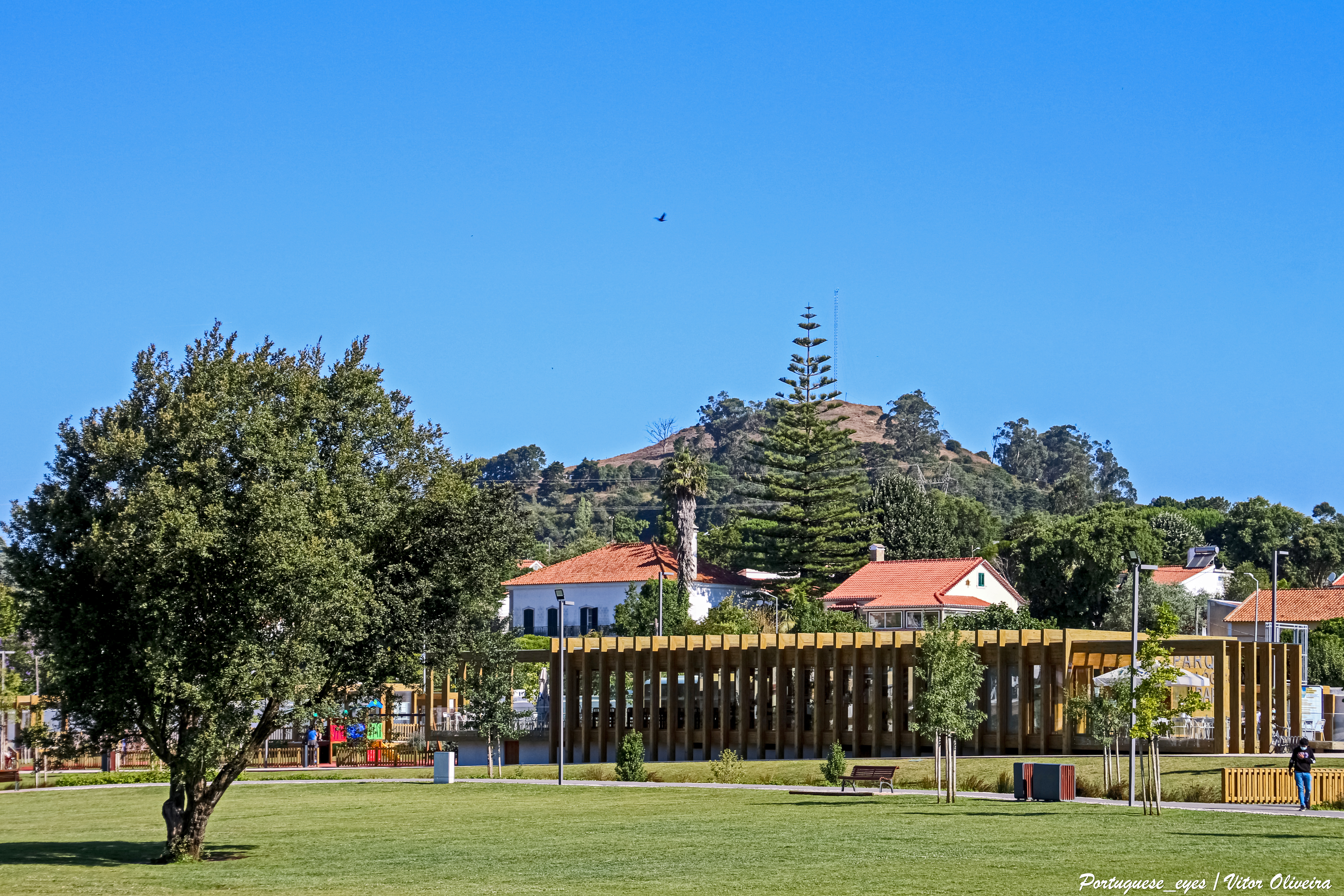
The town park.

Venda do Pinheiro is a small town in the municipality of Mafra, northern Lisbon district, Portugal. It was the head of a civil parish (freguesia) until the 2013 reform, when it was merged into Venda do Pinheiro and Santo Estêvão das Galés parish.

== History ==
The Portuguese version of Big Brother was filmed at Venda do Pinheiro. The town was affected by a wildfire on 31 July 2022.
