= Garein =

- Commune
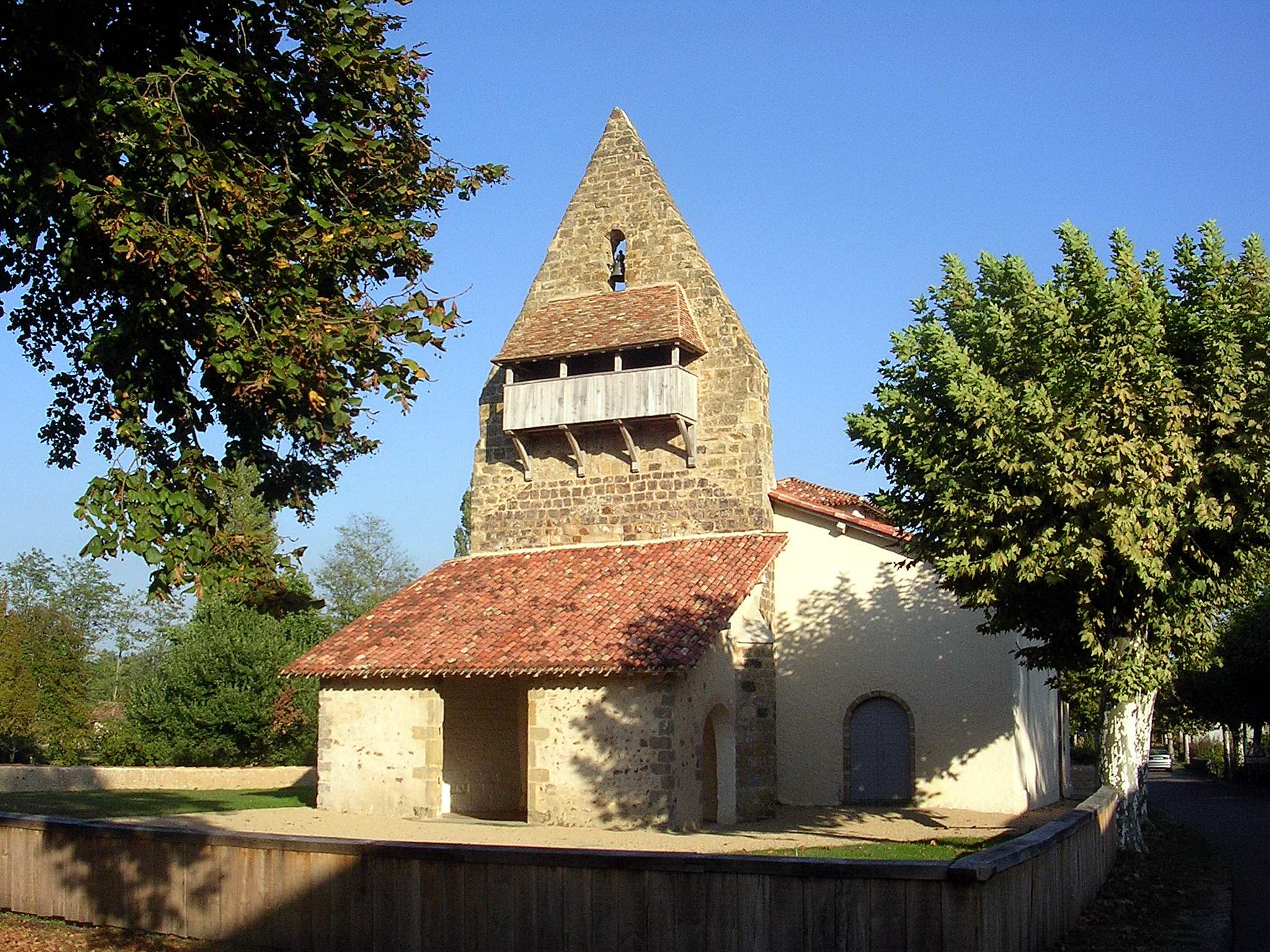
- Location of Garein
- Location within France Location within Nouvelle-Aquitaine
- Coordinates: 44°02′51″N 0°39′01″W
- Country: France
- Region: Nouvelle-Aquitaine
- Department: Landes
- Arrondissement: Mont-de-Marsan
- Canton: Haute Lande Armagnac

Government
  - Mayor (2020–2026): Philippe Sartre
- Area^{1}: 57.1 km^{2} (22.0 sq mi)
- Elevation: 36 m (118 ft)
- Highest elevation: 106 m (348 ft)
- Lowest elevation: 65 m (213 ft)
- Population (2023): 424
  - Density: 7.43/km^{2} (19.2/sq mi)
- Time zone: UTC+01:00 (CET)
  - Summer (DST): UTC+02:00 (CEST)
- INSEE/Postal code: 40105 /40420
- ^{1} French Land Register data, which excludes lakes, ponds, glaciers > 1 km^{2} (0.386 sq mi or 247 acres) and river estuaries.

Garein (French pronunciation: [ɡaʁɛ̃]; Occitan: Garenh) is a commune in the Landes department in Nouvelle-Aquitaine in southwestern France.

== Population ==
Historical population
Year	Pop.	±% p.a.
1968	401	—
1975	410	+0.32%
1982	385	−0.89%
1990	373	−0.40%
1999	382	+0.27%
2007	424	+1.31%
2012	428	+0.19%
2017	436	+0.37%
2023	424	−0.46%
Source: INSEE

== See also ==
- Communes of the Landes department
- Parc naturel régional des Landes de Gascogne
