= Canton of Les Landes des Graves =

Coordinates: 44.55°N 0.87°W

The canton of Les Landes des Graves is an administrative division of the Gironde department, southwestern France. It was created at the French canton reorganisation which came into effect in March 2015. Its seat is in Salles.

It consists of the following communes:

1. Arbanats
2. Balizac
3. Le Barp
4. Barsac
5. Belin-Béliet
6. Budos
7. Cérons
8. Guillos
9. Hostens
10. Illats
11. Landiras
12. Louchats
13. Lugos
14. Origne
15. Podensac
16. Portets
17. Preignac
18. Pujols-sur-Ciron
19. Saint-Léger-de-Balson
20. Saint-Magne
21. Saint-Michel-de-Rieufret
22. Saint-Symphorien
23. Salles
24. Le Tuzan
25. Virelade
