= Salles, Gironde =

Salles
- Commune
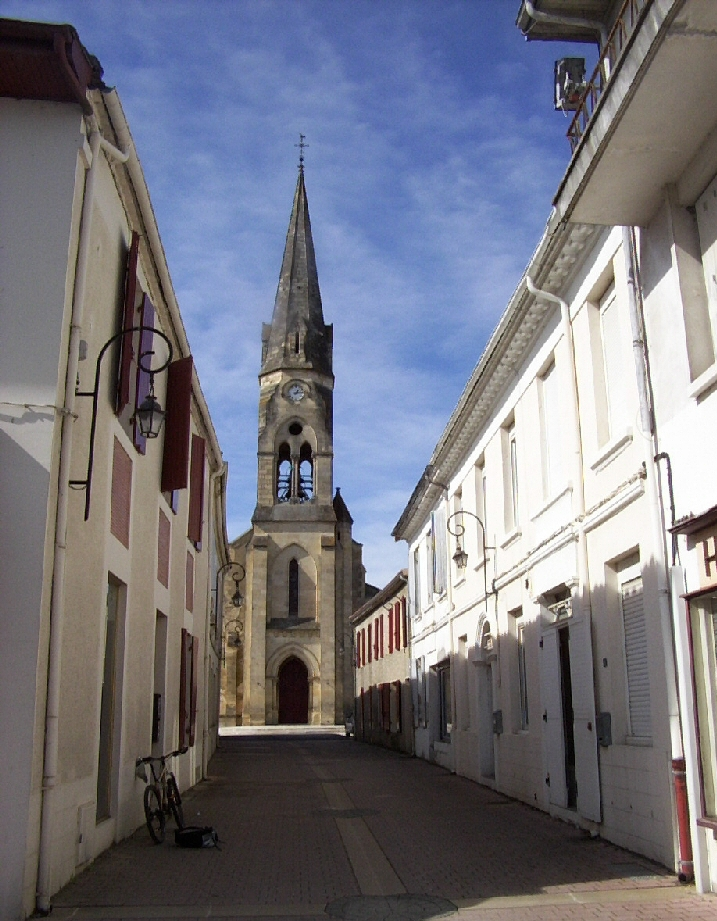
- The church in Salles

- Coat of arms
- Location of Salles
- Location within France Location within Nouvelle-Aquitaine
- Coordinates: 44°33′10″N 0°52′05″W
- Country: France
- Region: Nouvelle-Aquitaine
- Department: Gironde
- Arrondissement: Arcachon
- Canton: Les Landes des Graves
- Intercommunality: Val de l'Eyre

Government
  - Mayor (2020–2026): Bruno Bureau
- Area^{1}: 137.98 km^{2} (53.27 sq mi)
- Elevation: 41.5 m (136 ft)
- Highest elevation: 76 m (249 ft)
- Lowest elevation: 7 m (23 ft)
- Population (2023): 8,208
  - Density: 59.49/km^{2} (154.1/sq mi)
- Time zone: UTC+01:00 (CET)
  - Summer (DST): UTC+02:00 (CEST)
- INSEE/Postal code: 33498 /33770
- ^{1} French Land Register data, which excludes lakes, ponds, glaciers > 1 km^{2} (0.386 sq mi or 247 acres) and river estuaries.

Salles (French pronunciation: [sal]; Gascon: Salas) is a commune in the Gironde department, Nouvelle-Aquitaine, southwestern France.

== Population ==
Historical population

Year	Pop.	±% p.a.
1793	2,837	—
1800	2,938	+0.50%
1806	2,953	+0.08%
1821	3,388	+0.92%
1831	3,618	+0.66%
1836	3,628	+0.06%
1841	3,840	+1.14%
1846	3,973	+0.68%
1851	3,918	−0.28%
1856	3,876	−0.22%
1861	3,966	+0.46%
1866	4,052	+0.43%
1872	4,015	−0.15%
1876	4,048	+0.20%
1881	3,872	−0.89%
1886	3,900	+0.14%
1891	3,884	−0.08%
1896	3,862	−0.11%
1901	3,866	+0.02%

Year	Pop.	±% p.a.
1906	3,810	−0.29%
1911	3,756	−0.29%
1921	3,335	−1.18%
1926	3,307	−0.17%
1931	3,075	−1.44%
1936	2,848	−1.52%
1946	2,723	−0.45%
1954	2,840	+0.53%
1962	2,759	−0.36%
1968	2,916	+0.93%
1975	3,275	+1.67%
1982	3,645	+1.54%
1990	3,957	+1.03%
1999	4,487	+1.41%
2007	5,758	+3.17%
2012	6,349	+1.97%
2017	7,028	+2.05%
2023	8,208	+2.62%

Source: EHESS and INSEE (1968-2023)

== See also ==
- Communes of the Gironde department
- Parc naturel régional des Landes de Gascogne
