= Saint-Magne =

- Commune
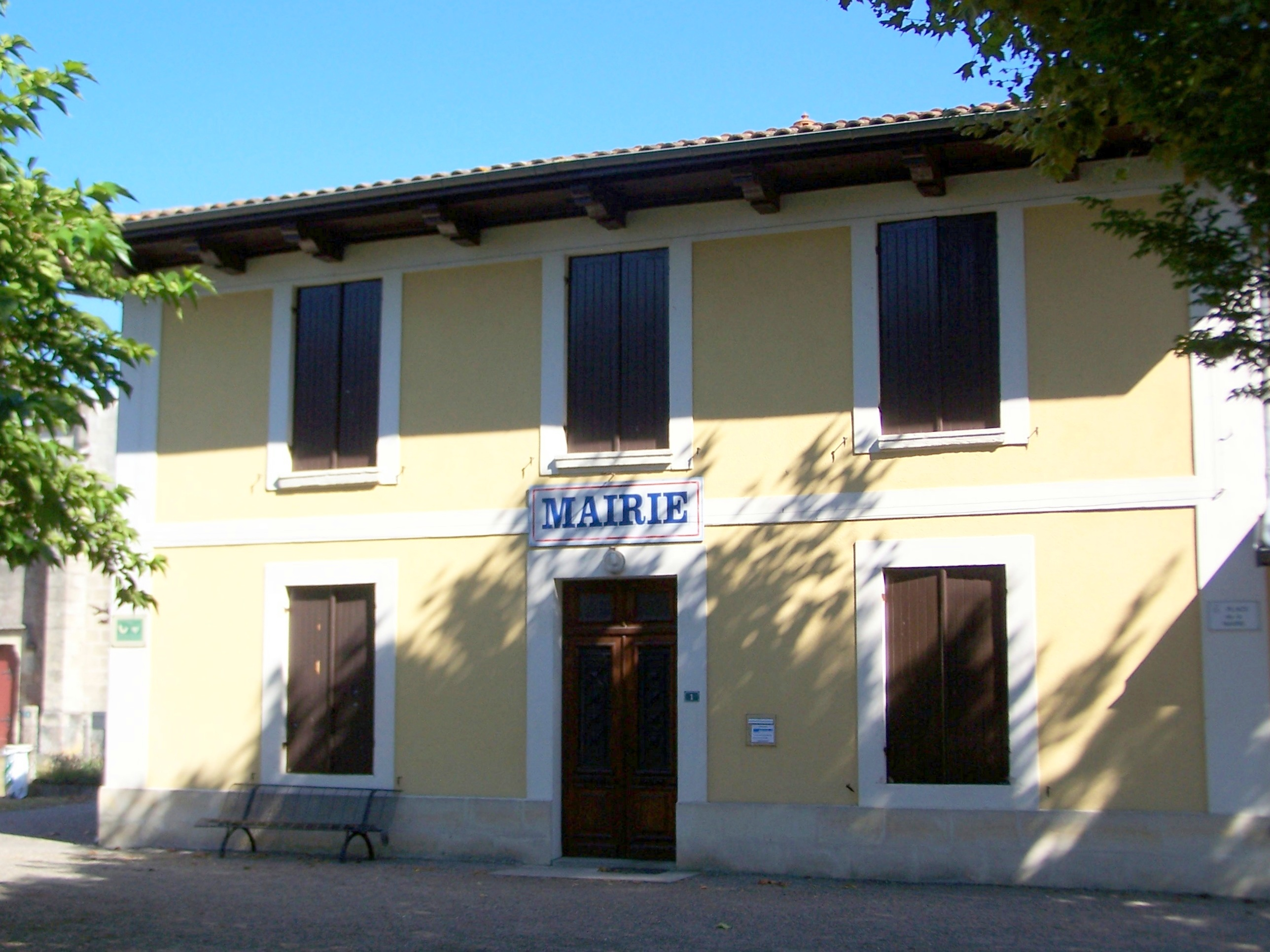
- The town hall in Saint-Magne

- Coat of arms
- Location of Saint-Magne
- Location within France Location within Nouvelle-Aquitaine
- Coordinates: 44°31′41″N 0°39′24″W
- Country: France
- Region: Nouvelle-Aquitaine
- Department: Gironde
- Arrondissement: Arcachon
- Canton: Les Landes des Graves
- Intercommunality: Val de l'Eyre

Government
  - Mayor (2020–2026): Ghislaine Charles
- Area^{1}: 82.66 km^{2} (31.92 sq mi)
- Elevation: 70 m (230 ft)
- Highest elevation: 81 m (266 ft)
- Lowest elevation: 50 m (160 ft)
- Population (2023): 1,260
  - Density: 15.2/km^{2} (39.5/sq mi)
- Time zone: UTC+01:00 (CET)
  - Summer (DST): UTC+02:00 (CEST)
- INSEE/Postal code: 33436 /33125
- ^{1} French Land Register data, which excludes lakes, ponds, glaciers > 1 km^{2} (0.386 sq mi or 247 acres) and river estuaries.

Saint-Magne (French pronunciation: [sɛ̃ maɲ]; Gascon: Sent Manhe) is a commune in the Gironde department in Nouvelle-Aquitaine in southwestern France.

== Population ==
Historical population
Year	Pop.	±% p.a.
1968	593	—
1975	538	−1.38%
1982	754	+4.94%
1990	799	+0.73%
1999	814	+0.21%
2007	958	+2.06%
2012	996	+0.78%
2017	967	−0.59%
2023	1,260	+4.51%
Source: INSEE

== See also ==
- Communes of the Gironde department
- Parc naturel régional des Landes de Gascogne
