= Origne =

- Commune
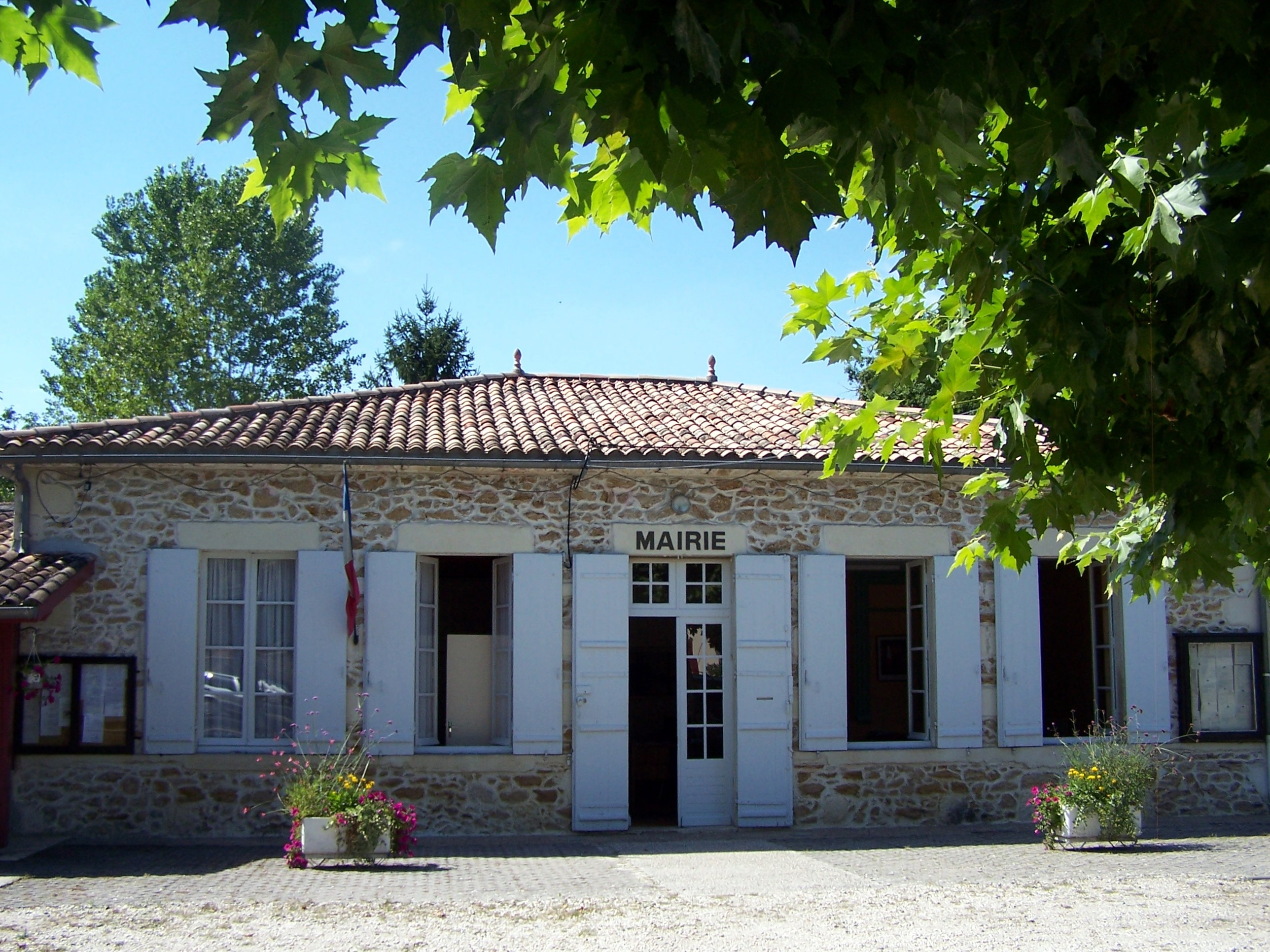
- Town hall
- Location of Origne
- Location within France Location within Nouvelle-Aquitaine
- Coordinates: 44°29′36″N 0°30′03″W
- Country: France
- Region: Nouvelle-Aquitaine
- Department: Gironde
- Arrondissement: Langon
- Canton: Les Landes des Graves
- Intercommunality: Sud Gironde

Government
  - Mayor (2020–2026): Vincent Dedieu
- Area^{1}: 27.19 km^{2} (10.50 sq mi)
- Elevation: 60 m (200 ft)
- Highest elevation: 76 m (249 ft)
- Lowest elevation: 38 m (125 ft)
- Population (2023): 187
  - Density: 6.88/km^{2} (17.8/sq mi)
- Time zone: UTC+01:00 (CET)
  - Summer (DST): UTC+02:00 (CEST)
- INSEE/Postal code: 33310 /33113
- ^{1} French Land Register data, which excludes lakes, ponds, glaciers > 1 km^{2} (0.386 sq mi or 247 acres) and river estuaries.

Origne (French pronunciation: [ɔʁiɲ]; Occitan: Aurinha) is a commune in the Gironde department in Nouvelle-Aquitaine in southwestern France.

== Population ==
Historical population
Year	Pop.	±% p.a.
1968	86	—
1975	57	−5.71%
1982	80	+4.96%
1990	112	+4.30%
1999	125	+1.23%
2007	160	+3.13%
2012	181	+2.50%
2017	182	+0.11%
2023	187	+0.45%
Source: INSEE

== See also ==
- Communes of the Gironde department
- Parc naturel régional des Landes de Gascogne
