= Landes de Gascogne Regional Natural Park =

Regional natural park of France

Coordinates: 44°29′23″N 0°47′26″W

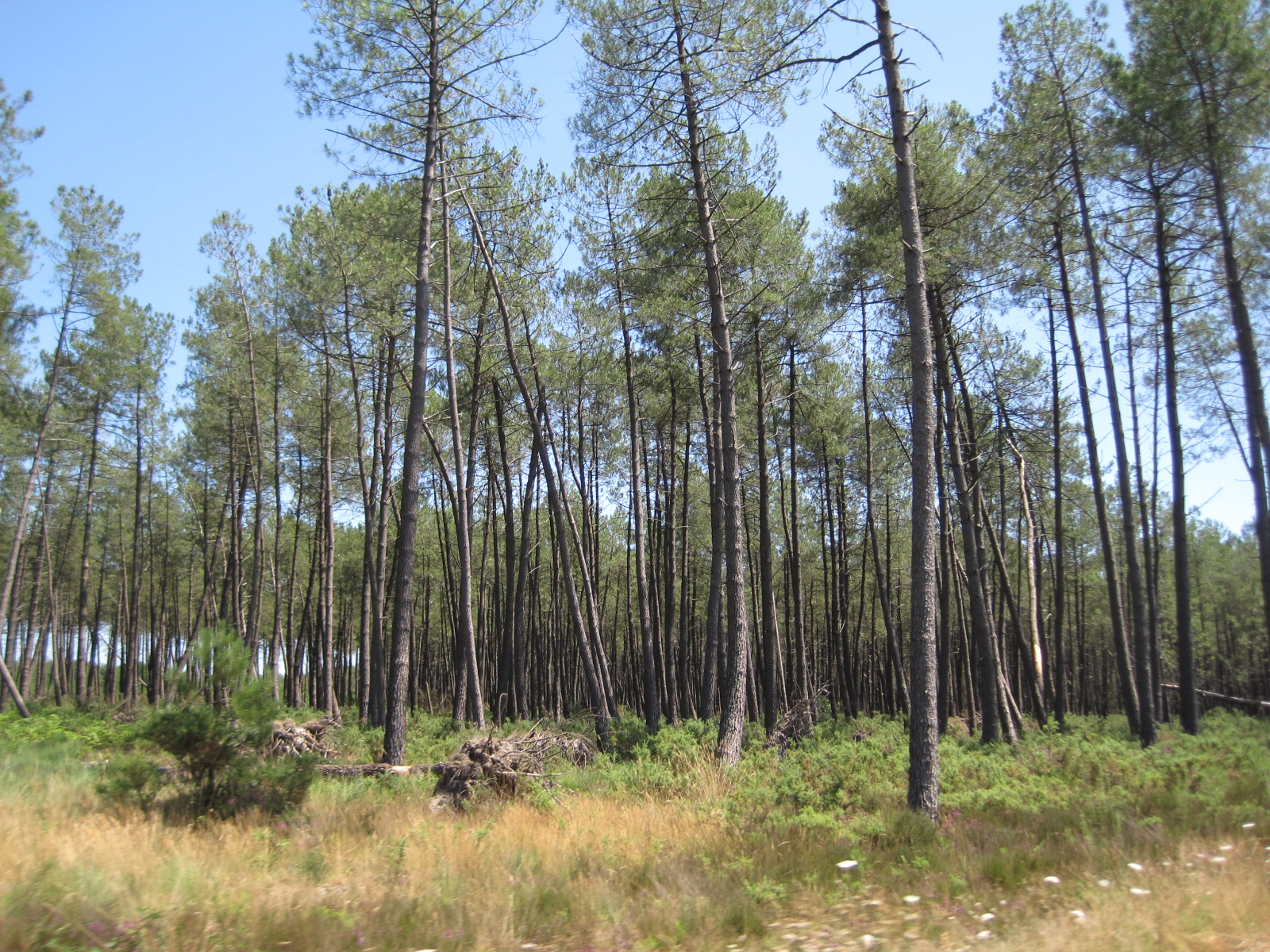
- Maritime pine in the forest of Landes Park emblem

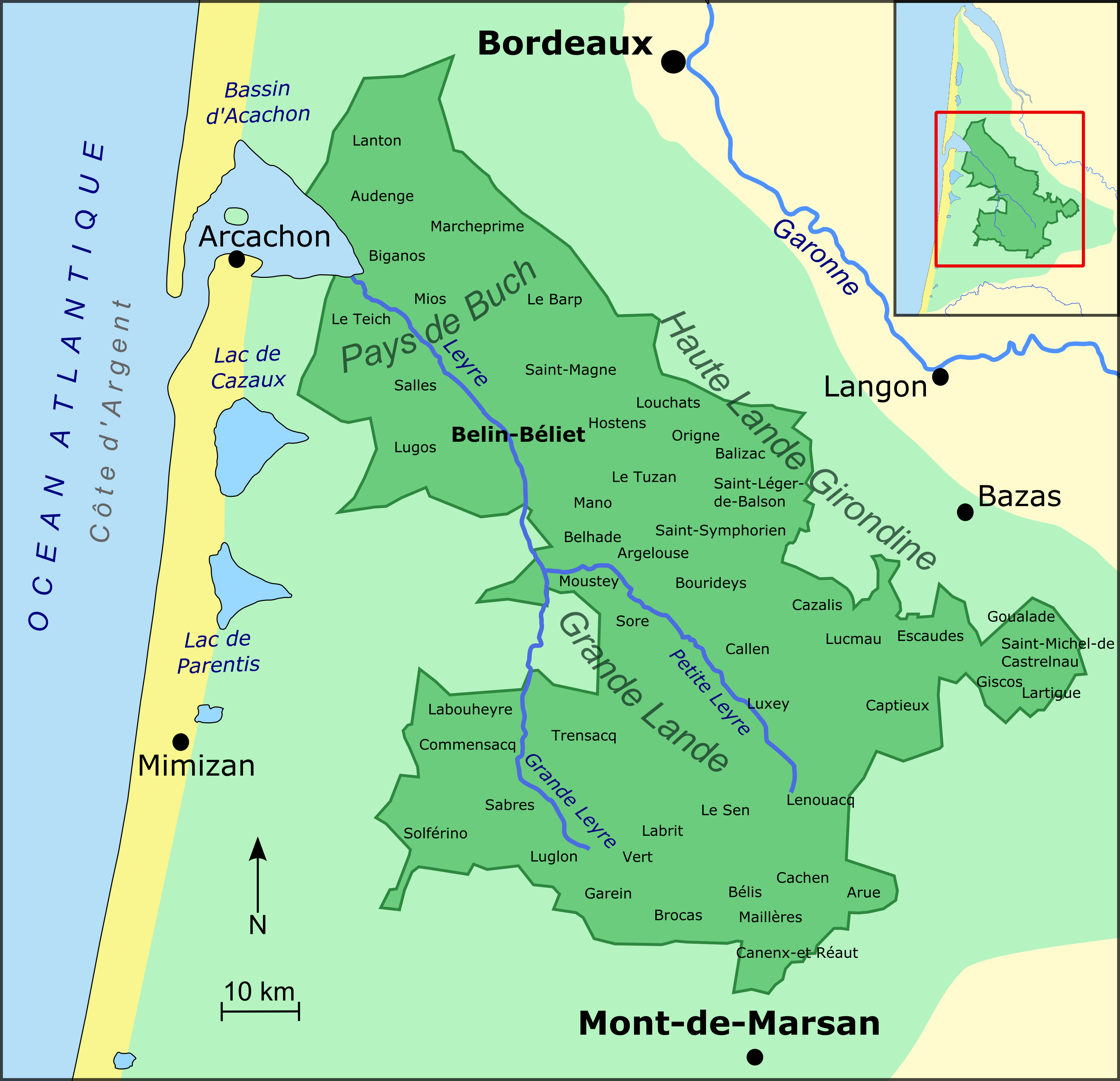
- Location: Nouvelle-Aquitaine, Landes; Gironde, France
- Area: 3,153 km^{2} (1,217 sq mi)
- Established: 1970
- Governing body: Fédération des parcs naturels régionaux de France

Landes de Gascogne Regional Natural Park (French: Parc naturel régional des Landes de Gascogne, pronounced [paʁk natyʁɛl ʁeʒjɔnal de lɑ̃d də ɡaskɔɲ]) is a protected area of pine forest, wetland and oceanic coastline located in the Landes de Gascogne natural region of Nouvelle-Aquitaine in southwestern France.

== History ==
The lands comprising the park were largely unpopulated throughout history. The roughly triangular area of the modern-day park was originally an inland sea which had receded, leaving a mostly infertile depression which did not attract human habitation. Large-scale public works helped drain, clear, and reforest the area during the nineteenth century but the transformation was limited. By the mid-twentieth century, government attention had turned to protecting the natural environment.

== Geography ==
Straddling the departments of Landes and Gironde, Parc naturel régional des Landes de Gascogne comprises the center of the massive forest of Landes. The park extends southeast from Arcachon Bay in Pays de Buch and encompasses the entire Leyre River. The park was originally conceived in 1970 with a total area of 206,000 hectares (510,000 acres), but has been increased to a modern total area of 315,300 hectares.

As of 2011, the park holds 41 small communes with approximately 60,000 inhabitants.

=== Member communes ===
The forty-one member communes are:

- Argelouse
- Audenge
- Belhade
- Belin-Beliet
- Biganos
- Bourideys
- Brocas
- Callen
- Captieux
- Commensacq
- Garein
- Hostens
- Labouheyre
- Labrit
- Le Barp
- Lencouacq
- Le Teich
- Le Tuzan
- Le Sen
- Louchats
- Lucmau
- Luglon
- Lugos
- Luxey
- Mano
- Marcheprime
- Mios
- Moustey
- Muret
- Origne
- Pissos
- Sabres
- Salles
- Saint-Léger-de-Balson
- Saint-Magne
- Saint-Symphorien
- Saugnacq-et-Muret
- Solférino
- Sore
- Trensacq
- Vert

==== Major features ====
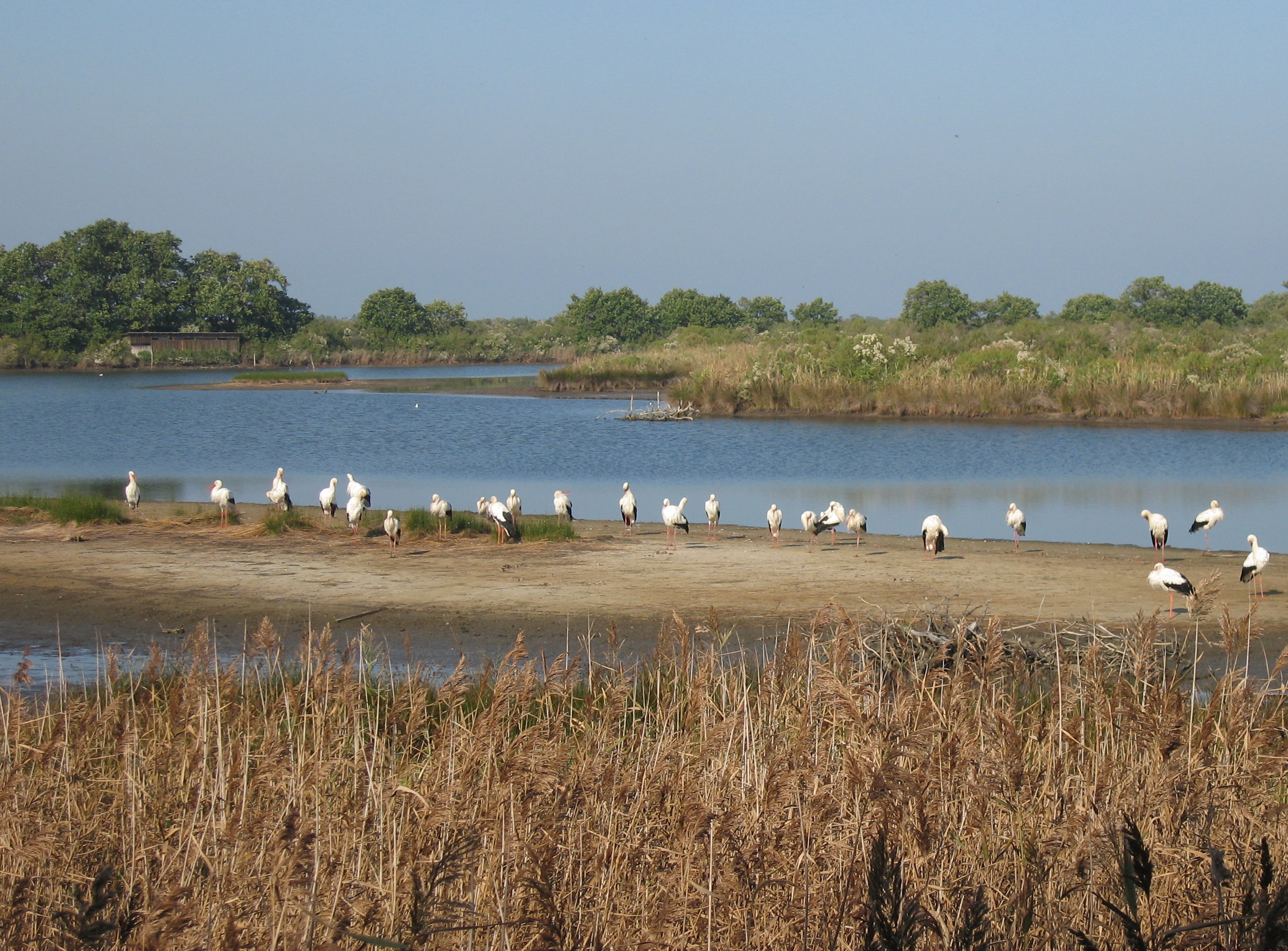
Teich bird sanctuary

The park maintains a bird sanctuary on Arcachon Bay, the parc ornithologique du Teich. Throughout the year, over 300,000 migratory birds take refuge in its wetlands.

At several sites throughout the park, there are sections of the regional museum, Ḗcomusée de la Grande Lande, which host exhibitions about the history, development and maintenance of the natural lands. The museum also organizes various events focused on Gascon lifestyles and traditions.

The local villages also organize their own events. Thousands of visitors come every year to the Flower Show at Garein, an annual weekend event which celebrated its 25th anniversary in 2010.

== Administration ==
The park is administered by a joint union of local authorities in the Syndicat Mixte du Parc Naturel Régional des Landes de Gascogne, a deliberative assembly of 45 members. The union includes public and private representatives of Gironde, Landes, and Aquitaine.

=== Park emblem ===
The park's unique emblem is derived from a woodcut, still visible today, made on the beam of an old building in Luxey. The scene depicts a leaping fox frustrated in its hunt: a solid horizontal line separates him from the hen who strolls serenely in the sun. The situation was a familiar one in the Gascony moors where generations of farmers built their livestock shelters on stilts.

== See also ==
- List of regional natural parks of France
