= Balizac =

- Commune
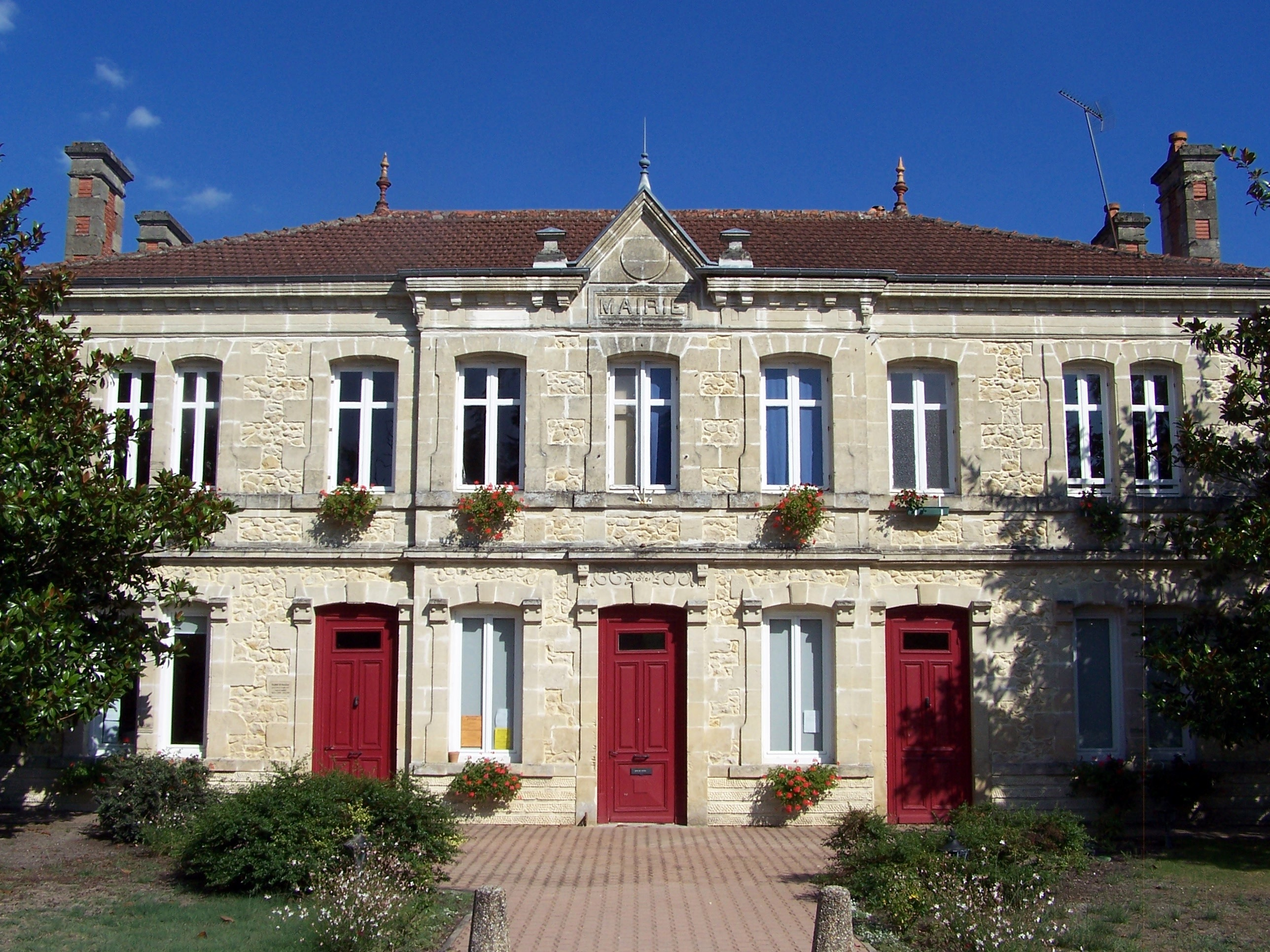
- Town hall
- Location of Balizac
- Location within France Location within Nouvelle-Aquitaine
- Coordinates: 44°29′17″N 0°26′39″W
- Country: France
- Region: Nouvelle-Aquitaine
- Department: Gironde
- Arrondissement: Langon
- Canton: Les Landes des Graves
- Intercommunality: Sud Gironde

Government
  - Mayor (2020–2026): Nathalie Duluc
- Area^{1}: 41.78 km^{2} (16.13 sq mi)
- Elevation: 43 m (141 ft)
- Highest elevation: 64 m (210 ft)
- Lowest elevation: 18 m (59 ft)
- Population (2023): 520
  - Density: 12/km^{2} (32/sq mi)
- Time zone: UTC+01:00 (CET)
  - Summer (DST): UTC+02:00 (CEST)
- INSEE/Postal code: 33026 /33730
- ^{1} French Land Register data, which excludes lakes, ponds, glaciers > 1 km^{2} (0.386 sq mi or 247 acres) and river estuaries.

Balizac (French pronunciation: [balizak]; Gascon: Balisac) is a commune in the Gironde department in southwestern France.

== Population ==
Historical population
Year	Pop.	±% p.a.
1968	252	—
1975	234	−1.05%
1982	266	+1.85%
1990	272	+0.28%
1999	321	+1.86%
2007	400	+2.79%
2012	473	+3.41%
2017	503	+1.24%
2023	520	+0.56%
Source: INSEE

== See also ==
- Communes of the Gironde department
