= Landiras =

- Commune
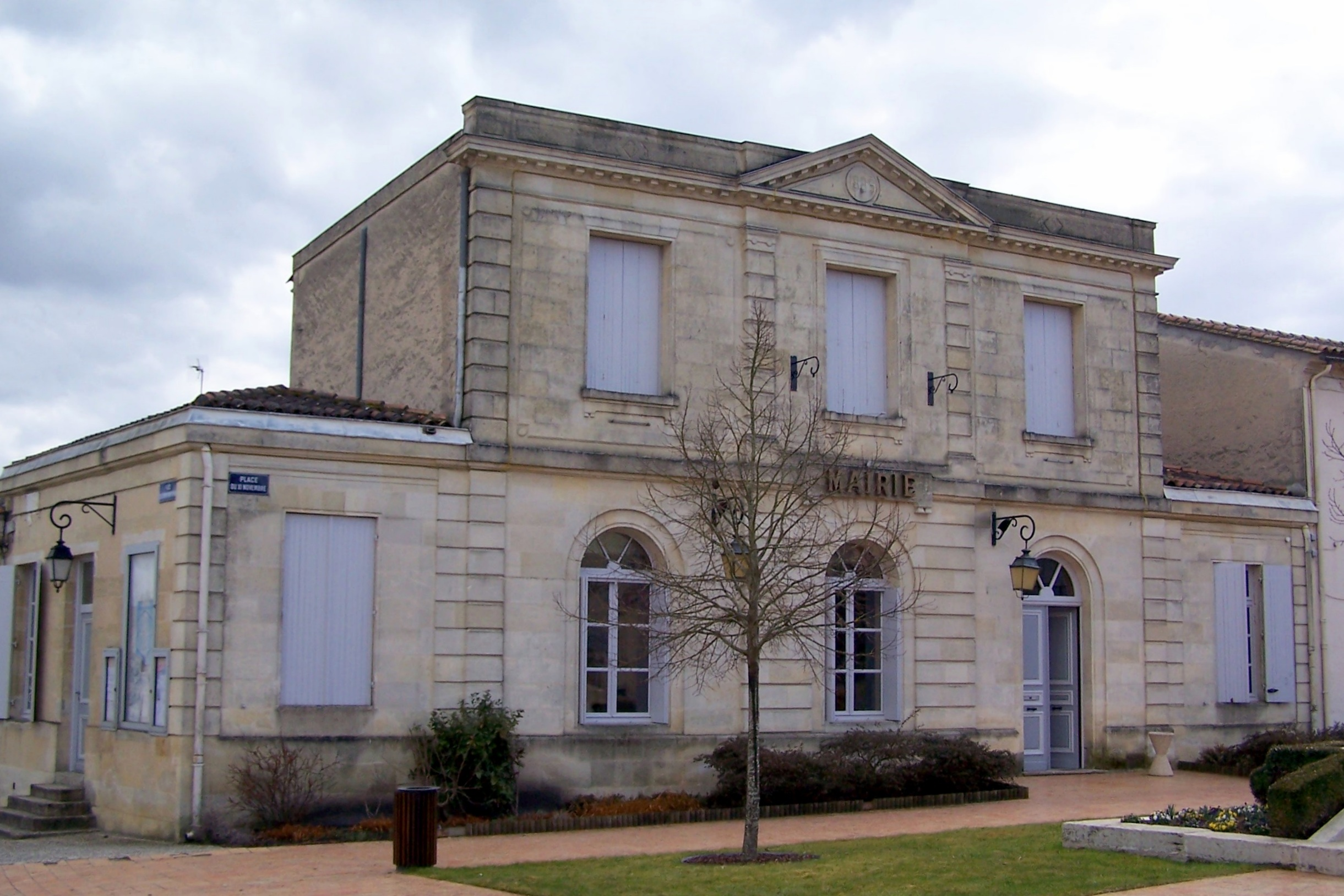
- Town hall

- Coat of arms
- Location of Landiras
- Location within France Location within Nouvelle-Aquitaine
- Coordinates: 44°34′06″N 0°24′51″W
- Country: France
- Region: Nouvelle-Aquitaine
- Department: Gironde
- Arrondissement: Langon
- Canton: Les Landes des Graves
- Intercommunality: Convergence Garonne

Government
  - Mayor (2020–2026): Jean-Marc Pelletant
- Area^{1}: 59.75 km^{2} (23.07 sq mi)
- Elevation: 41 m (135 ft)
- Highest elevation: 83 m (272 ft)
- Lowest elevation: 13 m (43 ft)
- Population (2023): 2,310
  - Density: 38.7/km^{2} (100/sq mi)
- Demonym: Landiranais
- Time zone: UTC+01:00 (CET)
  - Summer (DST): UTC+02:00 (CEST)
- INSEE/Postal code: 33225 /33720
- ^{1} French Land Register data, which excludes lakes, ponds, glaciers > 1 km^{2} (0.386 sq mi or 247 acres) and river estuaries.

Landiras (French pronunciation: [lɑ̃diʁas]; Gascon: Landiràs) is a commune in the Gironde department in the Nouvelle-Aquitaine region in Southwestern France.

== Population ==
Historical population
Year	Pop.	±% p.a.
1968	1,132	—
1975	1,089	−0.55%
1982	1,230	+1.75%
1990	1,418	+1.79%
1999	1,506	+0.67%
2007	1,915	+3.05%
2012	2,168	+2.51%
2017	2,227	+0.54%
2023	2,310	+0.61%
Source: INSEE

== Notable people ==
Jules Koundé (born 1998), professional footballer for FC Barcelona

== See also ==
- Communes of the Gironde department
