= Guillos =

- Commune
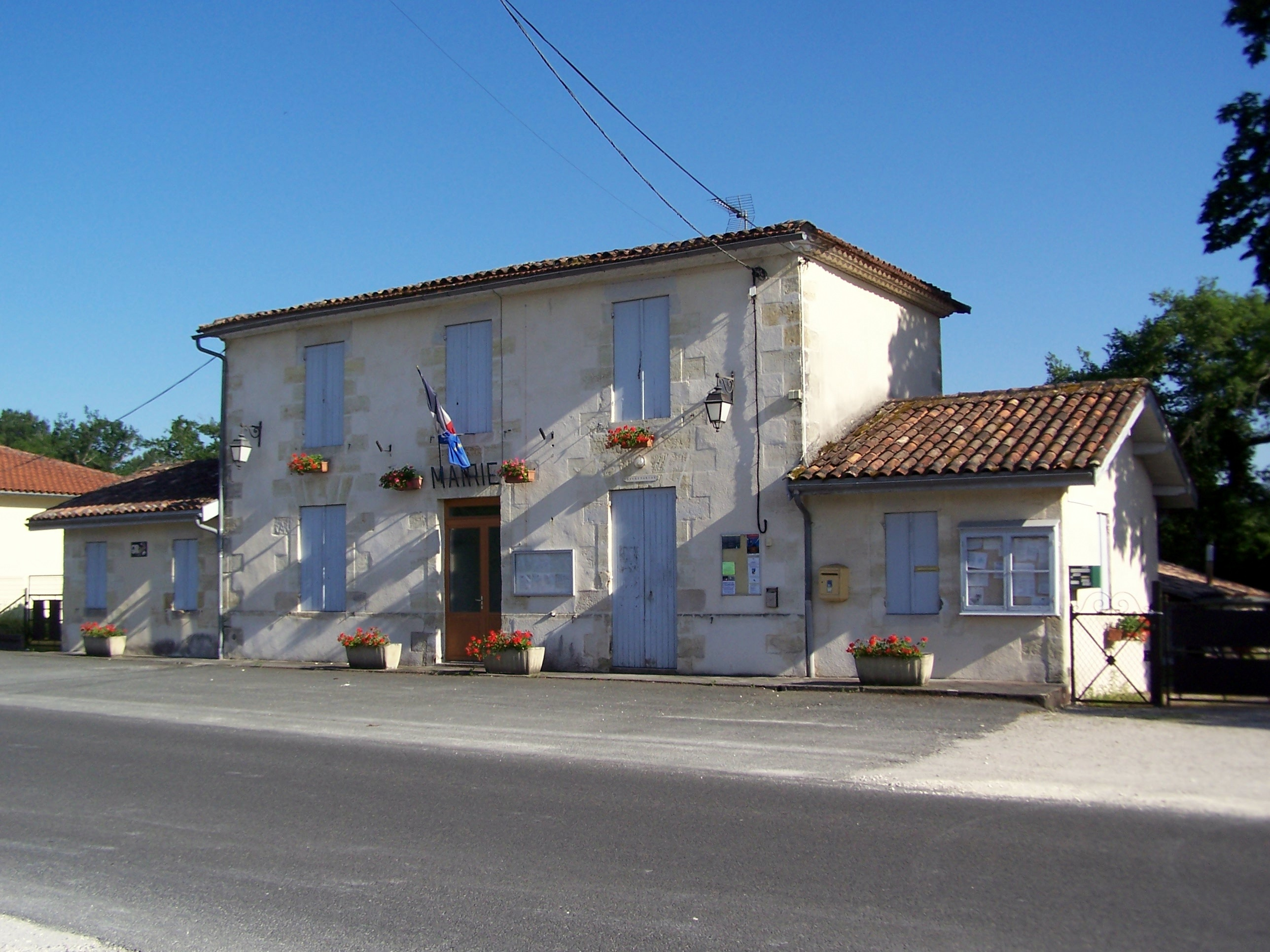
- Town hall
- Location of Guillos
- Location within France Location within Nouvelle-Aquitaine
- Coordinates: 44°32′56″N 0°30′05″W
- Country: France
- Region: Nouvelle-Aquitaine
- Department: Gironde
- Arrondissement: Langon
- Canton: Les Landes des Graves

Government
  - Mayor (2020–2026): Mylène Doreau
- Area^{1}: 22.67 km^{2} (8.75 sq mi)
- Elevation: 77 m (253 ft)
- Highest elevation: 82 m (269 ft)
- Lowest elevation: 65 m (213 ft)
- Population (2023): 467
  - Density: 20.6/km^{2} (53.4/sq mi)
- Time zone: UTC+01:00 (CET)
  - Summer (DST): UTC+02:00 (CEST)
- INSEE/Postal code: 33197 /33720
- ^{1} French Land Register data, which excludes lakes, ponds, glaciers > 1 km^{2} (0.386 sq mi or 247 acres) and river estuaries.

Guillos is a commune in the Gironde department in southwestern France.

== Population ==
Historical population
Year	Pop.	±% p.a.
1968	253	—
1975	225	−1.66%
1982	266	+2.42%
1990	372	+4.28%
1999	357	−0.46%
2007	387	+1.01%
2012	427	+1.99%
2017	450	+1.05%
2023	467	+0.62%
Source: INSEE

== See also ==
- Communes of the Gironde department
