= Hostens =

- Commune
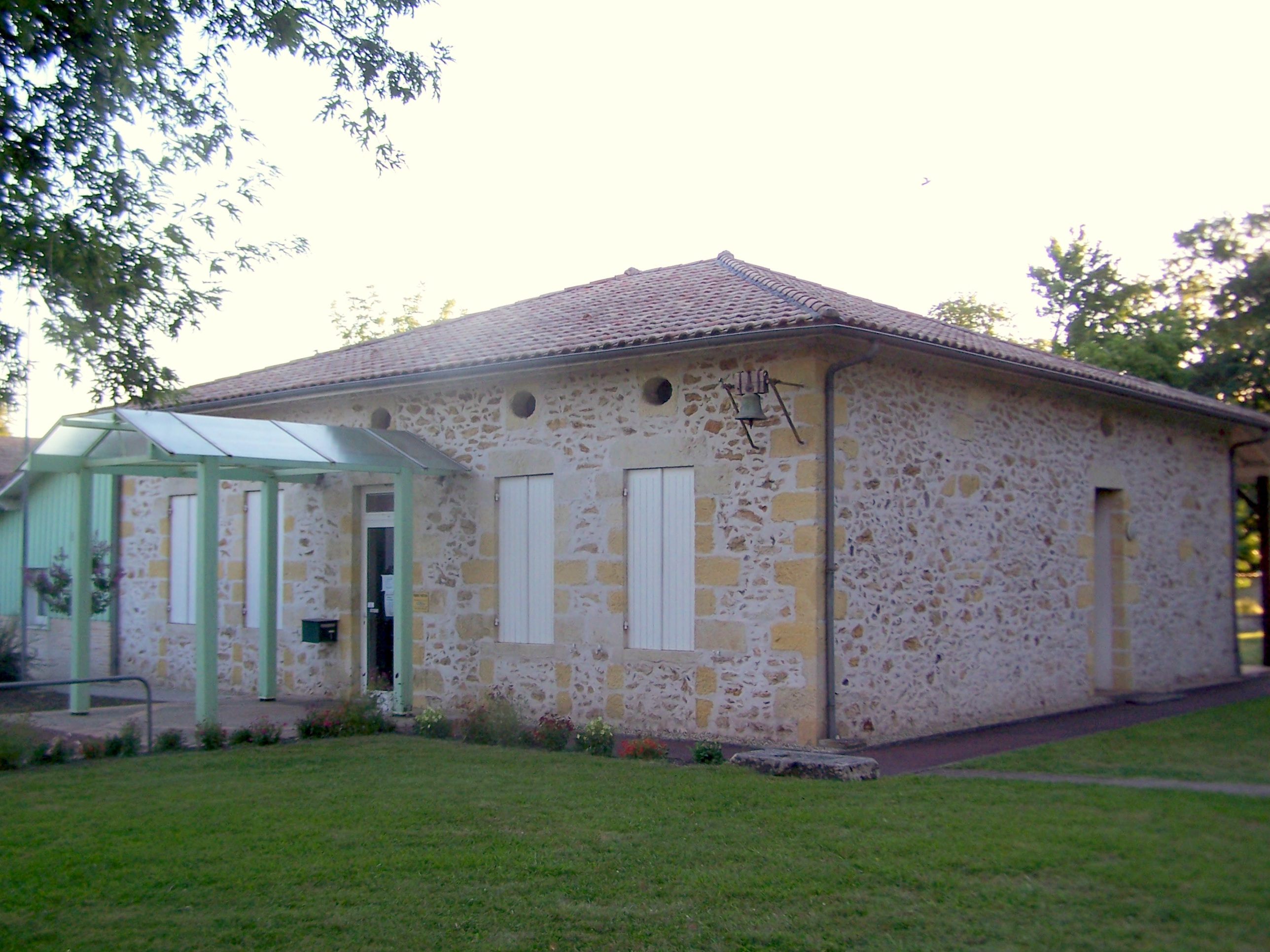
- The town hall in Hostens
- Location of Hostens
- Location within France Location within Nouvelle-Aquitaine
- Coordinates: 44°29′39″N 0°38′17″W
- Country: France
- Region: Nouvelle-Aquitaine
- Department: Gironde
- Arrondissement: Langon
- Canton: Les Landes des Graves

Government
  - Mayor (2020–2026): Jean-Louis Dartiailh
- Area^{1}: 57.64 km^{2} (22.25 sq mi)
- Elevation: 80 m (260 ft)
- Highest elevation: 100 m (330 ft)
- Lowest elevation: 49 m (161 ft)
- Population (2023): 1,554
  - Density: 26.96/km^{2} (69.83/sq mi)
- Time zone: UTC+01:00 (CET)
  - Summer (DST): UTC+02:00 (CEST)
- INSEE/Postal code: 33202 /33125
- ^{1} French Land Register data, which excludes lakes, ponds, glaciers > 1 km^{2} (0.386 sq mi or 247 acres) and river estuaries.

Hostens (French pronunciation: [ɔstɛ̃s]; Gascon: Ostens) is a commune in the Gironde department in southwestern France. It is around 35 km south of Bordeaux.

== Population ==
Historical population
| Year | Pop. | ±% p.a. |
|---|---|---|
| 1968 | 727 | — |
| 1975 | 692 | −0.70% |
| 1982 | 714 | +0.45% |
| 1990 | 721 | +0.12% |
| 1999 | 740 | +0.29% |
| 2007 | 1,177 | +5.97% |
| 2012 | 1,379 | +3.22% |
| 2017 | 1,329 | −0.74% |
| 2023 | 1,554 | +2.64% |
Source: INSEE

== See also ==
- Communes of the Gironde department
- Parc naturel régional des Landes de Gascogne
