= Louchats =

- Commune
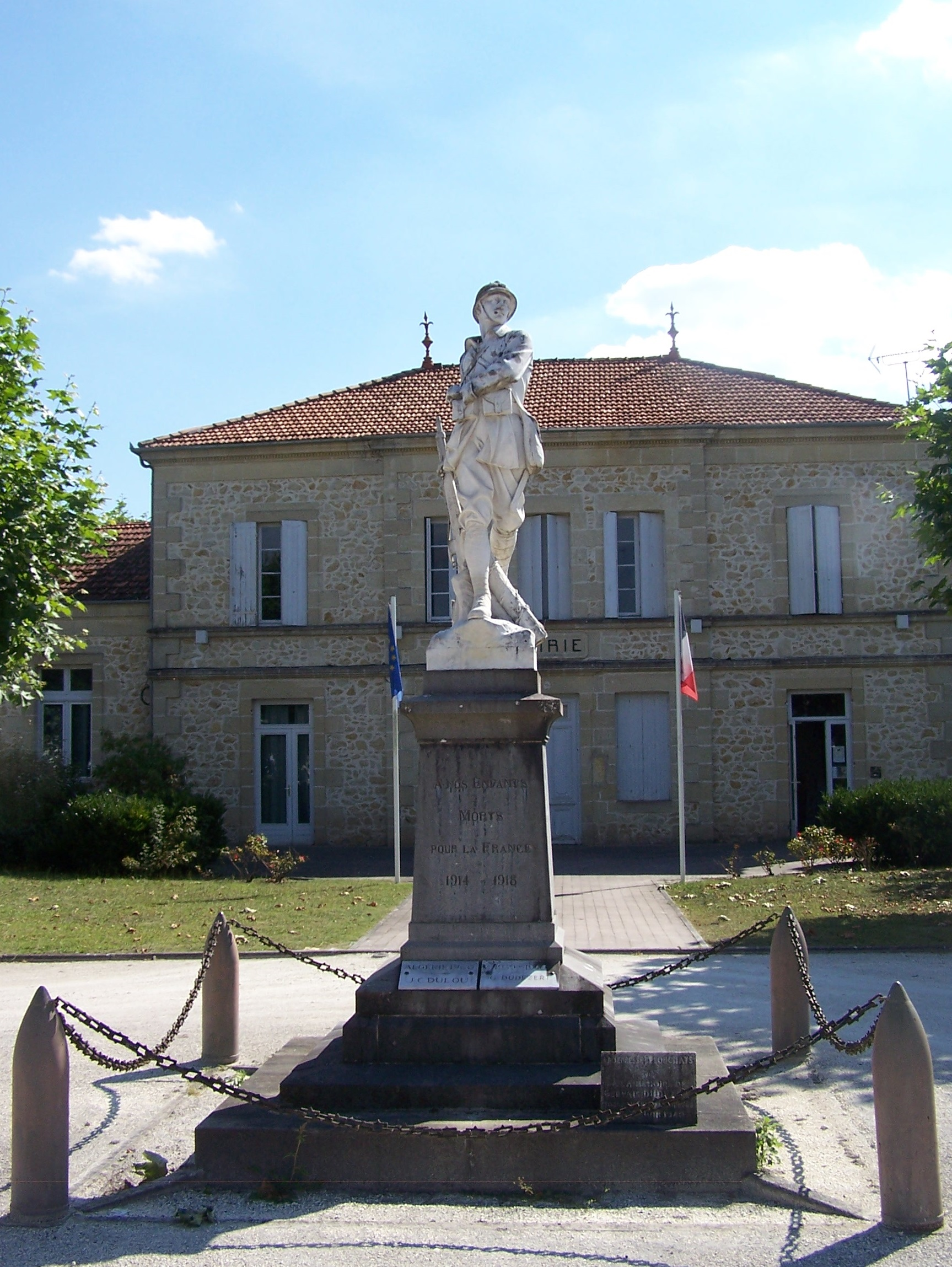
- World War I memorial and town hall
- Location of Louchats
- Location within France Location within Nouvelle-Aquitaine
- Coordinates: 44°30′48″N 0°33′57″W
- Country: France
- Region: Nouvelle-Aquitaine
- Department: Gironde
- Arrondissement: Langon
- Canton: Les Landes des Graves

Government
  - Mayor (2023–2026): Marc Viguié
- Area^{1}: 39.24 km^{2} (15.15 sq mi)
- Elevation: 76 m (249 ft)
- Highest elevation: 86 m (282 ft)
- Lowest elevation: 57 m (187 ft)
- Population (2023): 683
  - Density: 17.4/km^{2} (45.1/sq mi)
- Time zone: UTC+01:00 (CET)
  - Summer (DST): UTC+02:00 (CEST)
- INSEE/Postal code: 33251 /33125
- ^{1} French Land Register data, which excludes lakes, ponds, glaciers > 1 km^{2} (0.386 sq mi or 247 acres) and river estuaries.

Louchats (French pronunciation: [luʃats]; Gascon: Loishats) is a commune in the Gironde department in Nouvelle-Aquitaine in southwestern France.

== Population ==
Historical population
Year	Pop.	±% p.a.
1968	307	—
1975	228	−4.16%
1982	300	+4.00%
1990	425	+4.45%
1999	538	+2.65%
2007	704	+3.42%
2012	704	+0.00%
2017	724	+0.56%
2023	683	−0.97%
Source: INSEE

== See also ==
- Communes of the Gironde department
- Parc naturel régional des Landes de Gascogne
