= Portet (disambiguation) =

Portet may refer to:

== People ==
- Lorenzo Portet (1870–1917), Spanish anarchist
- Renada-Laura Portet (1927-2021), French writer of Northern Catalonia

== Places ==
- Canton of Portet-sur-Garonne, administrative division of the Haute-Garonne department, southern France
- Col de Portet, mountain pass in the French Pyrenees in the department of Hautes-Pyrénées and the Occitanie region
- Col de Portet d'Aspet, mountain pass in the central Pyrenees in the department of Haute-Garonne in France
- Portet, commune in the Pyrénées-Atlantiques department in southwestern France
- Portets, commune in the Gironde department in Nouvelle-Aquitaine in southwestern France
- Portet-d'Aspet, commune in the Haute-Garonne department in southwestern France
- Portet-de-Luchon, commune in the Haute-Garonne department in southwestern France
- Portet-sur-Garonne, ommune in the Haute-Garonne

== Transportation ==
- Portet-Saint-Simon station, railway station in Portet-sur-Garonne, Occitanie, France
- Portet-Saint-Simon–Puigcerdà railway, secondary railway line in southwestern France
- Portets station, French railway station located in the commune of Portets, Gironde department
