= Beautiran station =

Railway station in Beautiran, France

Coordinates: 44°42′04″N 0°27′00″W

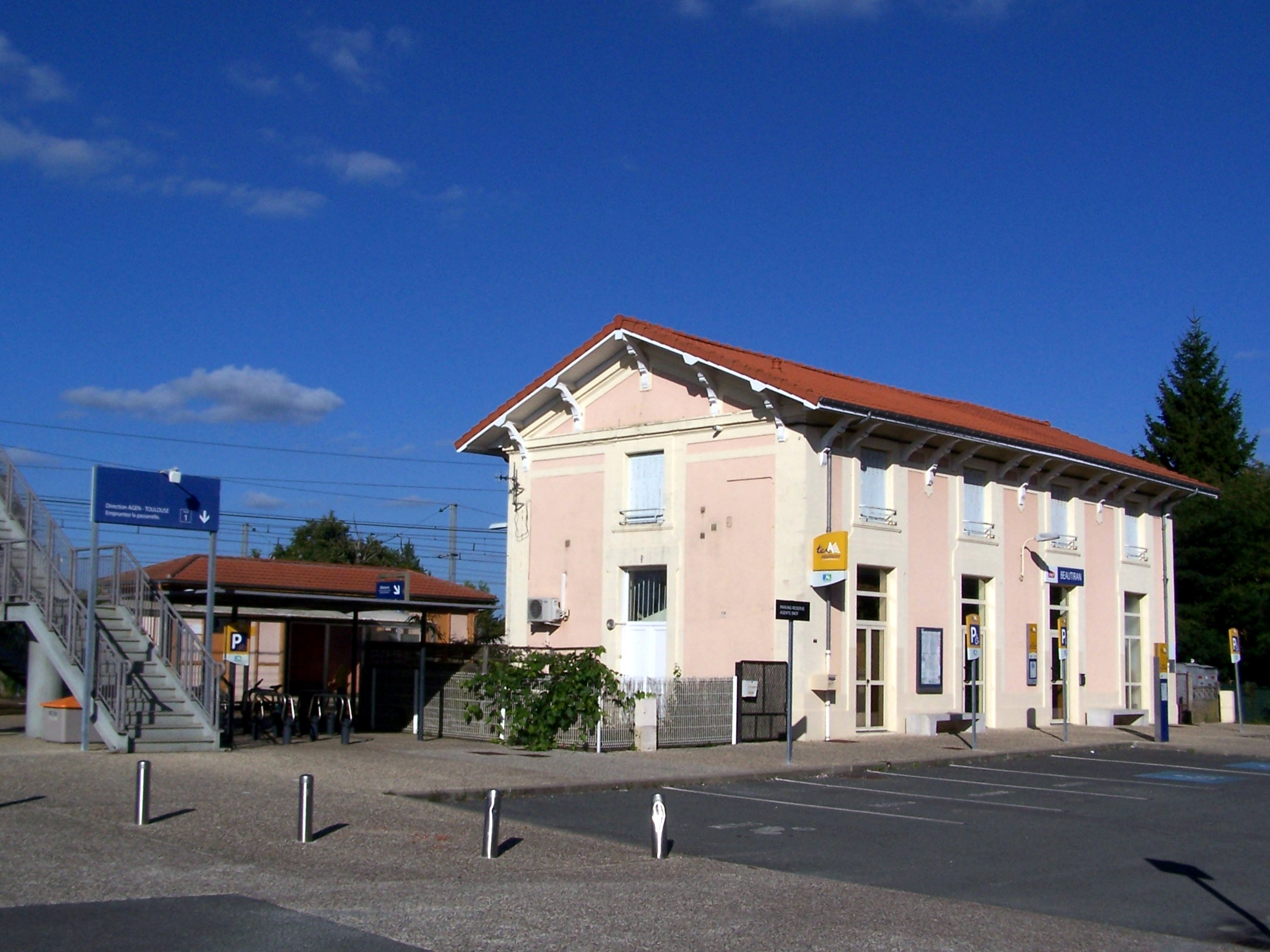
Train station of Beautiran (in the Gironde department of Nouvelle-Aquitaine)

Beautiran is a railway station in Beautiran, Nouvelle-Aquitaine, France. The station is located on the Bordeaux–Sète railway line. The station is served by TER, local services operated by SNCF.

== Train services ==
The following services currently call at Beautiran:

- local service (TER Nouvelle-Aquitaine) Bordeaux - Langon - Marmande - Agen

Preceding station	TER Nouvelle-Aquitaine	Following station
Saint-Médard-d'Eyrans towards Bordeaux	43.2U	Portets towards Langon
Bordeaux Terminus	44	Cérons towards Agen
