= Barsac =

Barsac may refer to:

- Barsac, Drôme, a village in the Drôme department, France
- Barsac, Gironde, a village in the Gironde department, France
  - Barsac railway station, its railway station
  - Barsac AOC, its wine certification, part of the Sauternes wine region

== See also ==
- Barsacq, French surname
- The Barsac Mission
