= Cadaujac station =

Railway station in Nouvelle-Aquitaine, France

Coordinates: 44°45′06″N 0°32′15″W

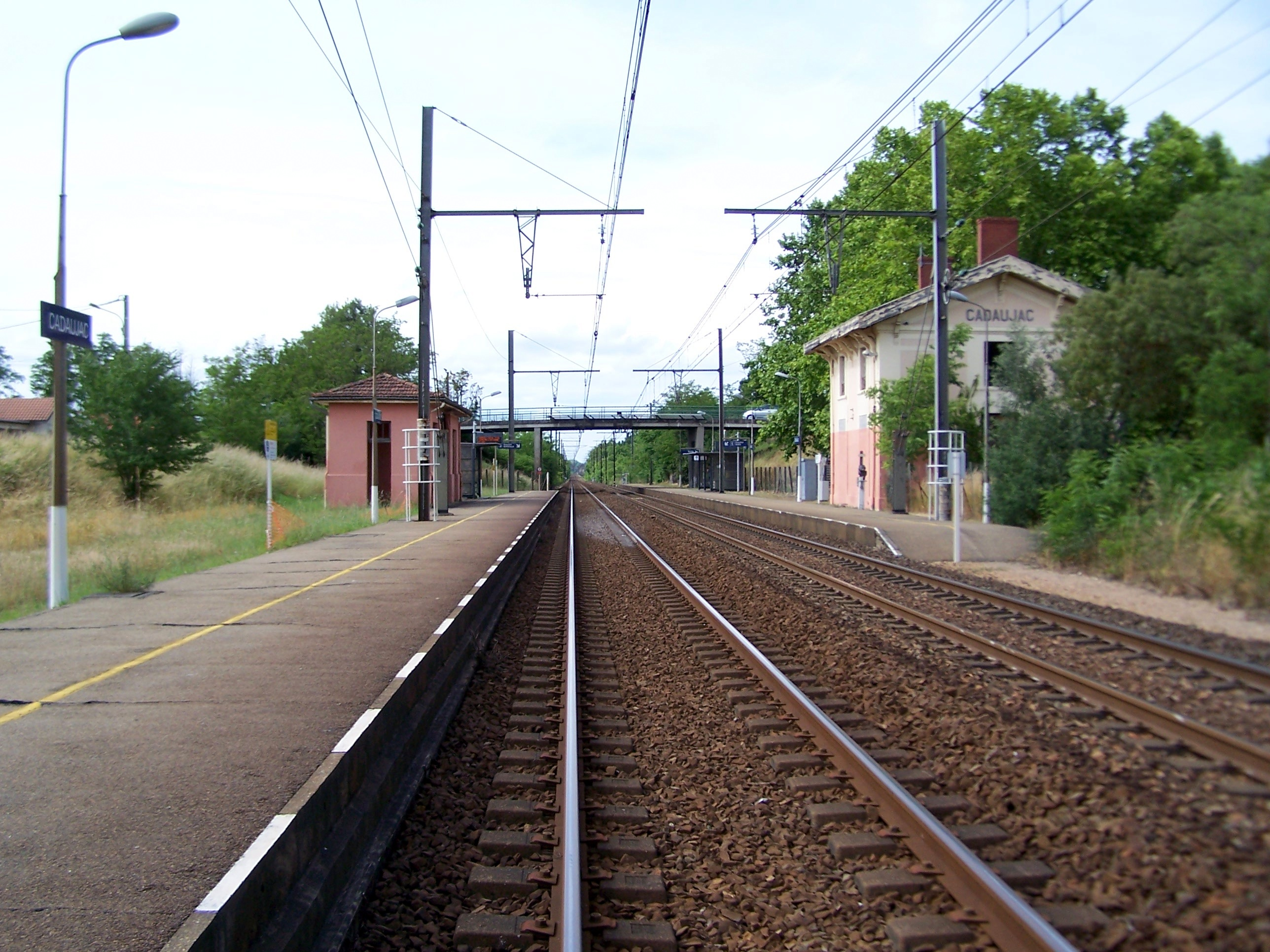
Train station of Cadaujac (Gironde, France, tracks toward Bordeaux

Cadaujac is a railway station in Cadaujac, Nouvelle-Aquitaine, France. The station is located on the Bordeaux–Sète railway line. The station is served by TER (local) services operated by SNCF.

== Train services ==
The following services currently call at Cadaujac:

- local service (TER Nouvelle-Aquitaine) Bordeaux - Langon

| Preceding station | TER Nouvelle-Aquitaine | Following station |
|---|---|---|
| Villenave-d'Ornon towards Bordeaux | 43.2U | Saint-Médard-d'Eyrans towards Langon |
