= Saint-Médard-d'Eyrans station =

Railway station in Saint-Médard-d'Eyrans, France

Coordinates: 44°42′56″N 0°30′15″W

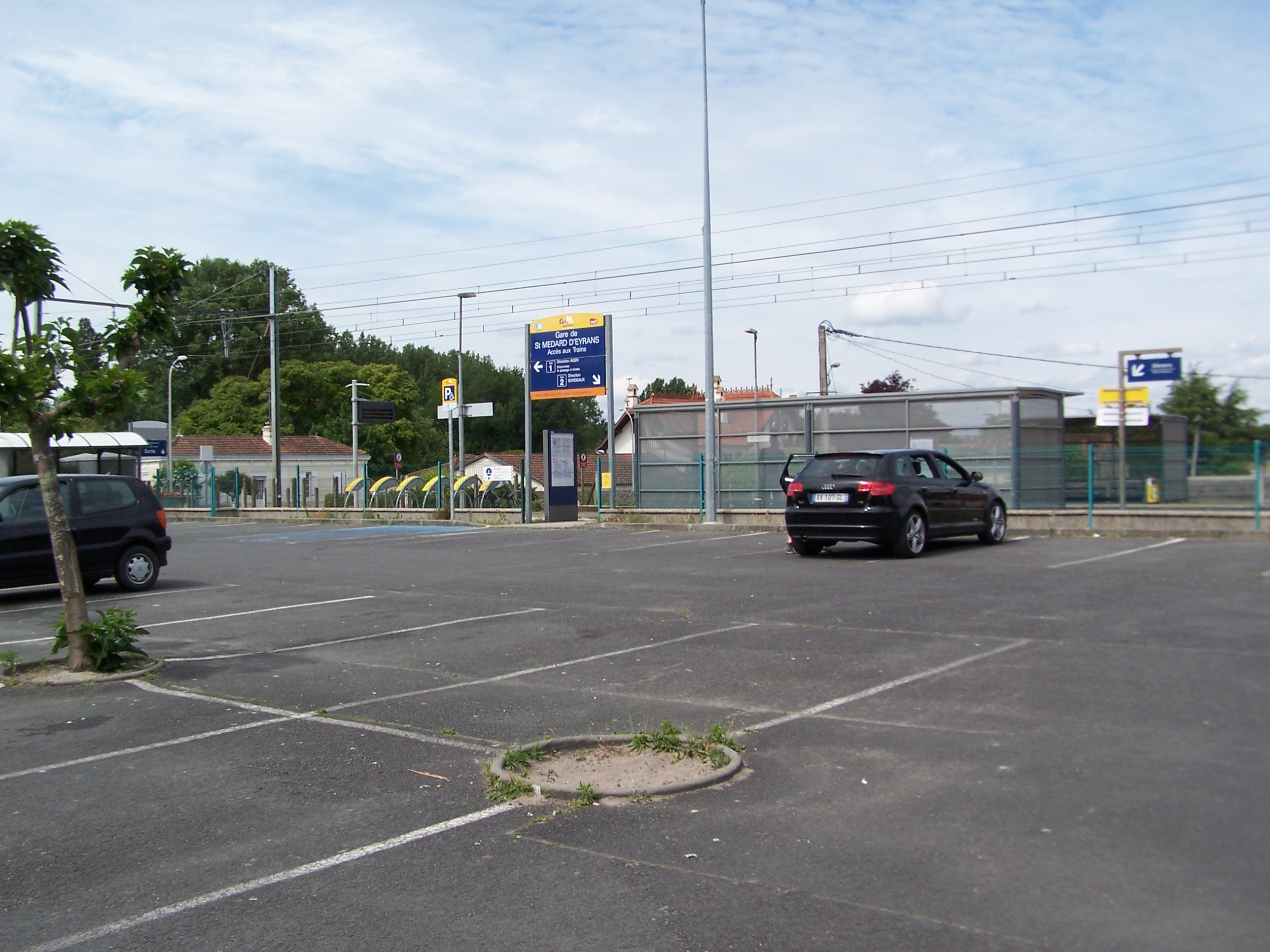
Train station of Saint-Médard-d'Eyrans (Gironde, France, parking and entrance

Saint-Médard-d'Eyrans is a railway station in Saint-Médard-d'Eyrans, Nouvelle-Aquitaine, France. The station is located on the Bordeaux–Sète railway line. The station is served by TER (local) services operated by SNCF.

== Train services ==
The following services currently call at Saint-Médard-d'Eyrans:

- local service (TER Nouvelle-Aquitaine) Bordeaux - Langon

Preceding station	TER Nouvelle-Aquitaine	Following station
Cadaujac towards Bordeaux	43.2U	Beautiran towards Langon
