= Villenave-d'Ornon station =

Railway station in Villenave-d'Ornon, France

Coordinates: 44°46′06″N 0°32′50″W

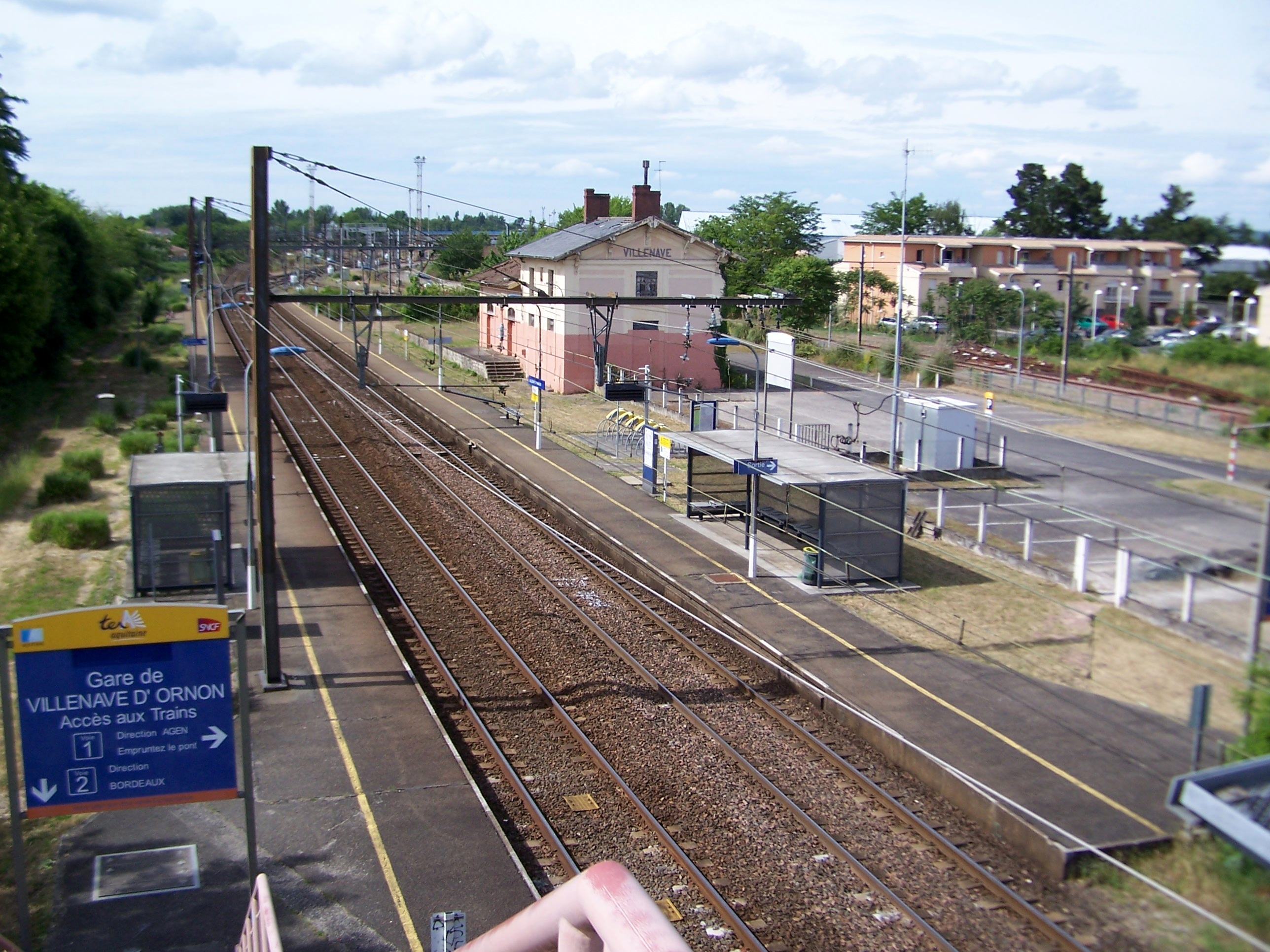
Train station of Villenave-d'Ornon (Gironde, France), tracks toward Bordeaux

Villenave-d'Ornon is a railway station in Villenave-d'Ornon near Bordeaux, Nouvelle-Aquitaine, France. The station is located on the Bordeaux–Sète railway line. The station is served by TER (local) services operated by SNCF.

== Train services ==
The following services currently call at Villenave-d'Ornon:

- local service (TER Nouvelle-Aquitaine) Bordeaux - Langon

Preceding station	TER Nouvelle-Aquitaine	Following station
Bègles towards Bordeaux	43.2U	Cadaujac towards Langon
