= Castres (disambiguation) =

Castres may refer to:

- Castres, a commune in the Tarn department in the Midi-Pyrénées region
- Castres, Aisne, a commune in the Aisne department in the Picardy region
- Castres-Gironde, a commune in the Gironde department in the Aquitaine region
- Arrondissement of Castres, an arrondissement in the Tarn department in the Midi-Pyrénées region
