= Saint-Paul-de-Fenouillet =

- Commune
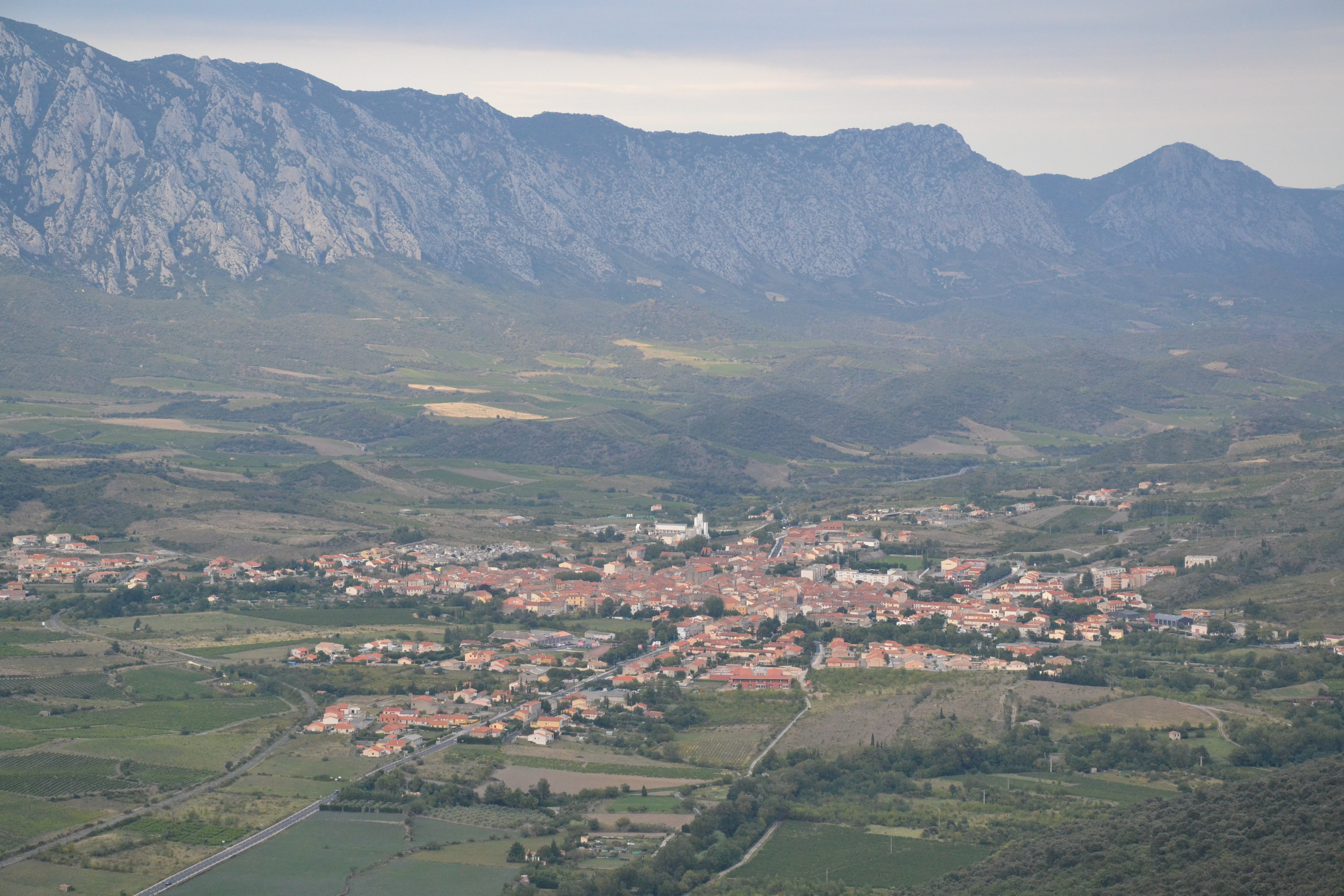
- Saint-Paul-de-Fenouillet, seen from the trail of Saint-Martin

- Coat of arms
- Location of Saint-Paul-de-Fenouillet
- Location within France Location within Occitanie
- Coordinates: 42°48′36″N 2°30′18″E
- Country: France
- Region: Occitania
- Department: Pyrénées-Orientales
- Arrondissement: Prades
- Canton: La Vallée de l'Agly
- Intercommunality: Agly Fenouillèdes

Government
  - Mayor (2021–2026): Jacques Bayona
- Area^{1}: 43.90 km^{2} (16.95 sq mi)
- Elevation: 267 m (876 ft)
- Highest elevation: 966 m (3,169 ft)
- Lowest elevation: 170 m (560 ft)
- Population (2023): 1,742
  - Density: 39.68/km^{2} (102.8/sq mi)
- Time zone: UTC+01:00 (CET)
  - Summer (DST): UTC+02:00 (CEST)
- INSEE/Postal code: 66187 /66220
- ^{1} French Land Register data, which excludes lakes, ponds, glaciers > 1 km^{2} (0.386 sq mi or 247 acres) and river estuaries.

Saint-Paul-de-Fenouillet (French pronunciation: [sɛ̃ pɔl də fənujɛ]; Languedocien: Sant Pau de Fenolhet) is a commune in the Pyrénées-Orientales department in southern France.

== Geography ==
Saint-Paul-de-Fenouillet is located in the canton of La Vallée de l'Agly and in the arrondissement of Perpignan.

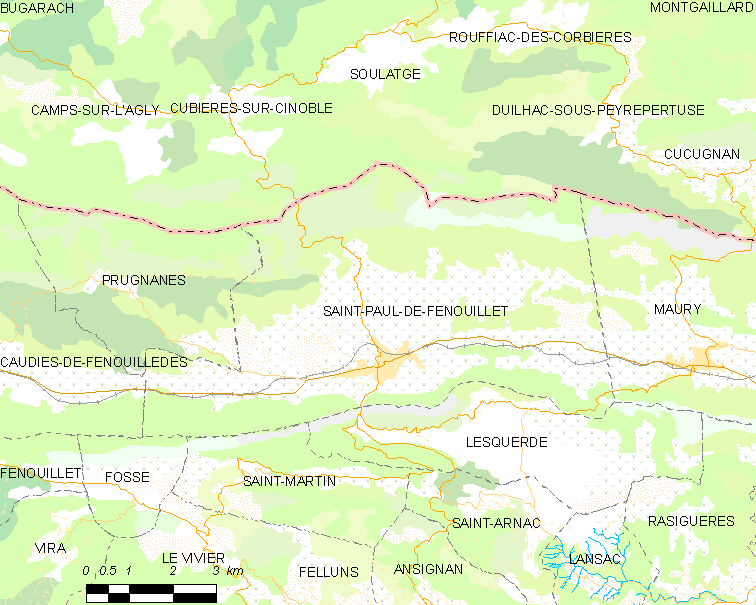
Map of Saint-Paul-de-Fenouillet and its surrounding communes

== Government and politics ==
=== International relations ===
Saint-Paul-de-Fenouillet is twinned with the town of Ennis in the Republic of Ireland.

== Population ==
Historical population
Year	Pop.	±% p.a.
1968	2,635	—
1975	2,531	−0.57%
1982	2,350	−1.05%
1990	2,214	−0.74%
1999	1,858	−1.93%
2007	1,966	+0.71%
2012	1,898	−0.70%
2017	1,812	−0.92%
2023	1,742	−0.65%
Source: INSEE

== Sites of interest ==
- The church of the chapter of Saint-Paul, built between the 14th and 17th centuries and protected as a monument historique since 1989.
- The Saint-Antoine de Galamus hermitage, built in the 15th century, and described in 1821 by Joseph Antoine Cervini and Antoine Ignace Melling as the « most beautiful wonder of Roussillon ».

== Coat of arms ==
It is said that the coat of arms has a relationship with Jean Lannes, 1st Duc de Montebello, 1st Prince de Siewierz (10 April 1769 – 31 May 1809) and Marshal of the Empire whose coat of arms has the sword pointing up, in recognition for his relationship with Marie Antoinette and Marius Fenouillet during the First Empire.

== Notable people ==
- Renada-Laura Portet (1927-2021), writer and linguist

== See also ==
- Corbières Massif
- Fenolheda
- Communes of the Pyrénées-Orientales department
