= Podensac station =

Railway station in Podensac, France

Coordinates: 44°38′57″N 0°21′32″W

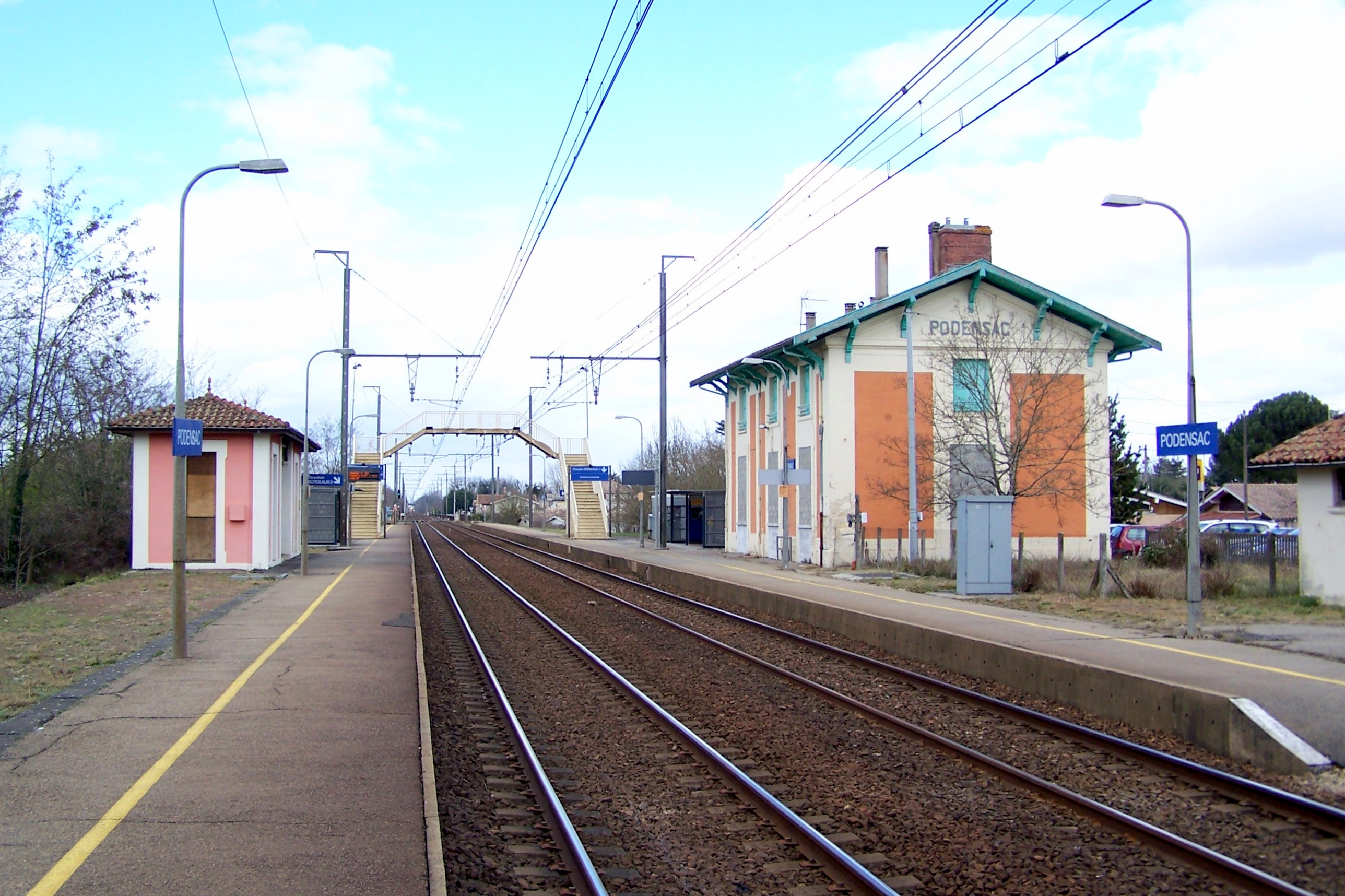
Podensac station

Podensac is a railway station in Podensac, Nouvelle-Aquitaine, France. The station is located on the Bordeaux–Sète railway line. The station is served by TER (local) services operated by SNCF.

== Train services ==
The following services currently call at Podensac:

- local service (TER Nouvelle-Aquitaine) Bordeaux - Langon

Preceding station	TER Nouvelle-Aquitaine	Following station
Arbanats towards Bordeaux	43.2U	Cérons towards Langon
