= Arbanats station =

Railway station in Arbanats, France

Coordinates: 44°40′29″N 0°23′44″W

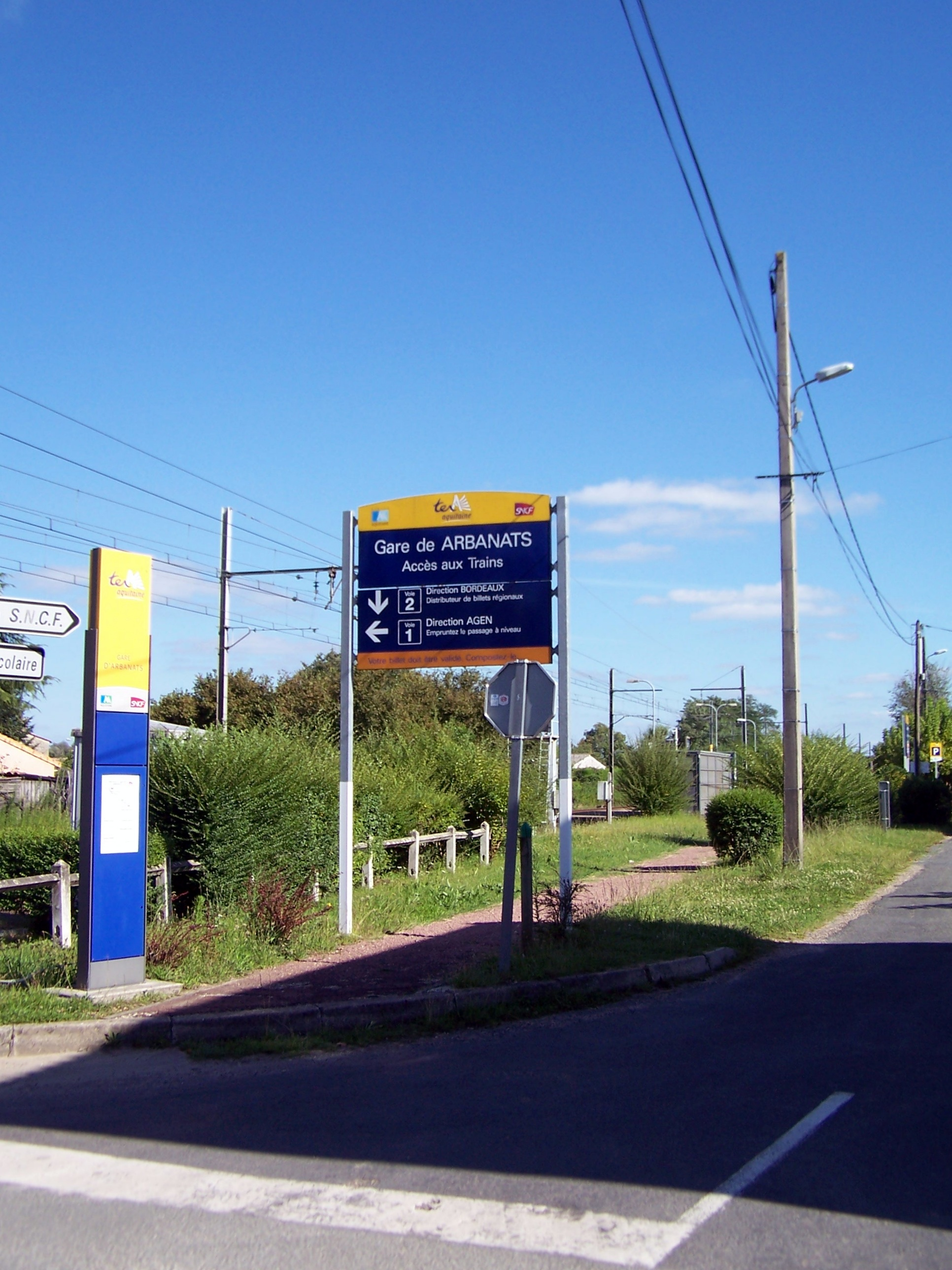
Arbanats station

Arbanats station (French: Gare d'Arbanats) is a railway station in Arbanats, Nouvelle-Aquitaine, France. The station is located on the Bordeaux–Sète railway line. The station is served by TER (local) services operated by SNCF.

== Train services ==
The following services currently call at Arbanats:

- local service (TER Nouvelle-Aquitaine) Bordeaux - Langon

Preceding station	TER Nouvelle-Aquitaine	Following station
Portets towards Bordeaux	43.2U	Podensac towards Langon
