= Canton of La Brède =

Canton of France

Coordinates: 44.68°N 0.53°W

- Canton
- Location of the Canton of La Brède in the Gironde department.
- Country: France
- Region: Nouvelle-Aquitaine
- Department: Gironde
- No. of communes: {{{nbcomm}}}
- Established: 5 Brumaire year X (27 October 1801)

Government
  - Representatives (2021–2028): Bernard Fath; Corinne Martinez
- Area: 330.14 km^{2} (127.47 sq mi)
- Population (2023): 47,671
  - Density: 144.40/km^{2} (373.98/sq mi)
- INSEE code: 33 08

The canton of La Brède is an administrative division of the Gironde department, southwestern France. Its borders were not modified at the French canton reorganisation which came into effect in March 2015. Its seat is in La Brède.

It consists of the following communes:

1. Ayguemorte-les-Graves
2. Beautiran
3. La Brède
4. Cabanac-et-Villagrains
5. Cadaujac
6. Castres-Gironde
7. Isle-Saint-Georges
8. Léognan
9. Martillac
10. Saint-Médard-d'Eyrans
11. Saint-Morillon
12. Saint-Selve
13. Saucats
