= Preignac station =

Railway station in Preignac, Nouvelle-Aquitane, France

Coordinates: 44°34′41″N 0°18′06″W

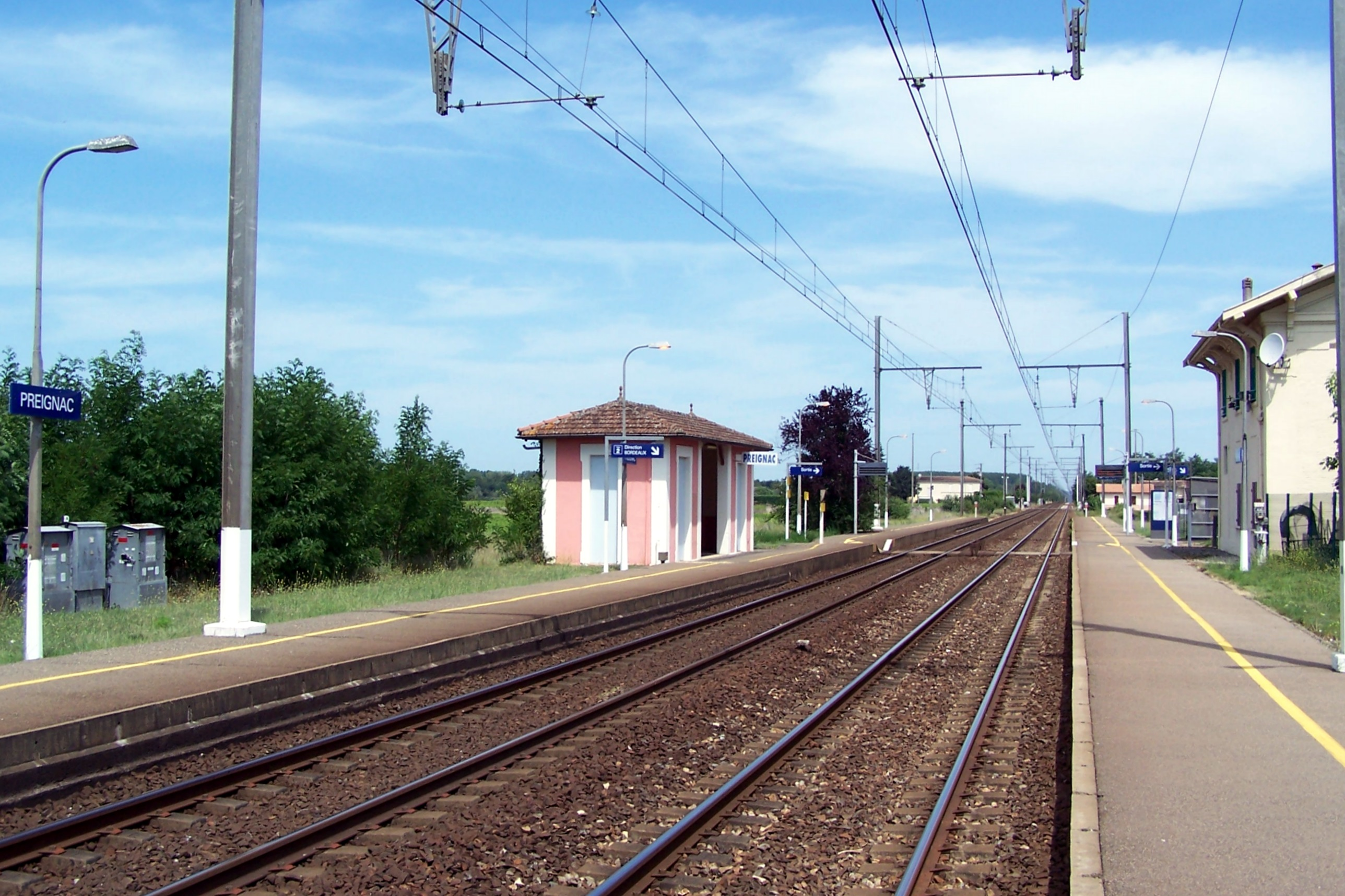
Preignac station

Preignac is a railway station in Preignac, Nouvelle-Aquitaine, France. The station is located on the Bordeaux–Sète railway line. The station is served by TER (local) services operated by SNCF.

== Train services ==
The following services currently call at Preignac:

- local service (TER Nouvelle-Aquitaine) Bordeaux - Langon

| Preceding station | TER Nouvelle-Aquitaine | Following station |
|---|---|---|
| Barsac towards Bordeaux | 43.2U | Langon Terminus |
