= Château de Mongenan =

18th-century folly and botanical garden in Portets, France

Coordinates: 44°41′46″N 0°25′51″W

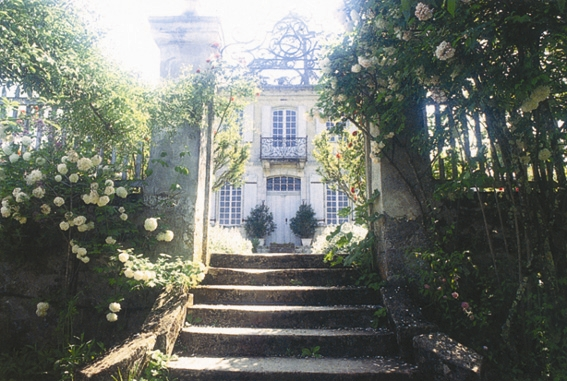

The Château de Mongenan is an 18th-century folly and botanical garden in Portets, in the Gironde Department of France. The gardens are classified by the Committee of Parks and Gardens of the French Ministry of Culture as among the Notable Gardens of France.

The Château de Mongenan has been listed as a Monument historique since 2003

== History ==
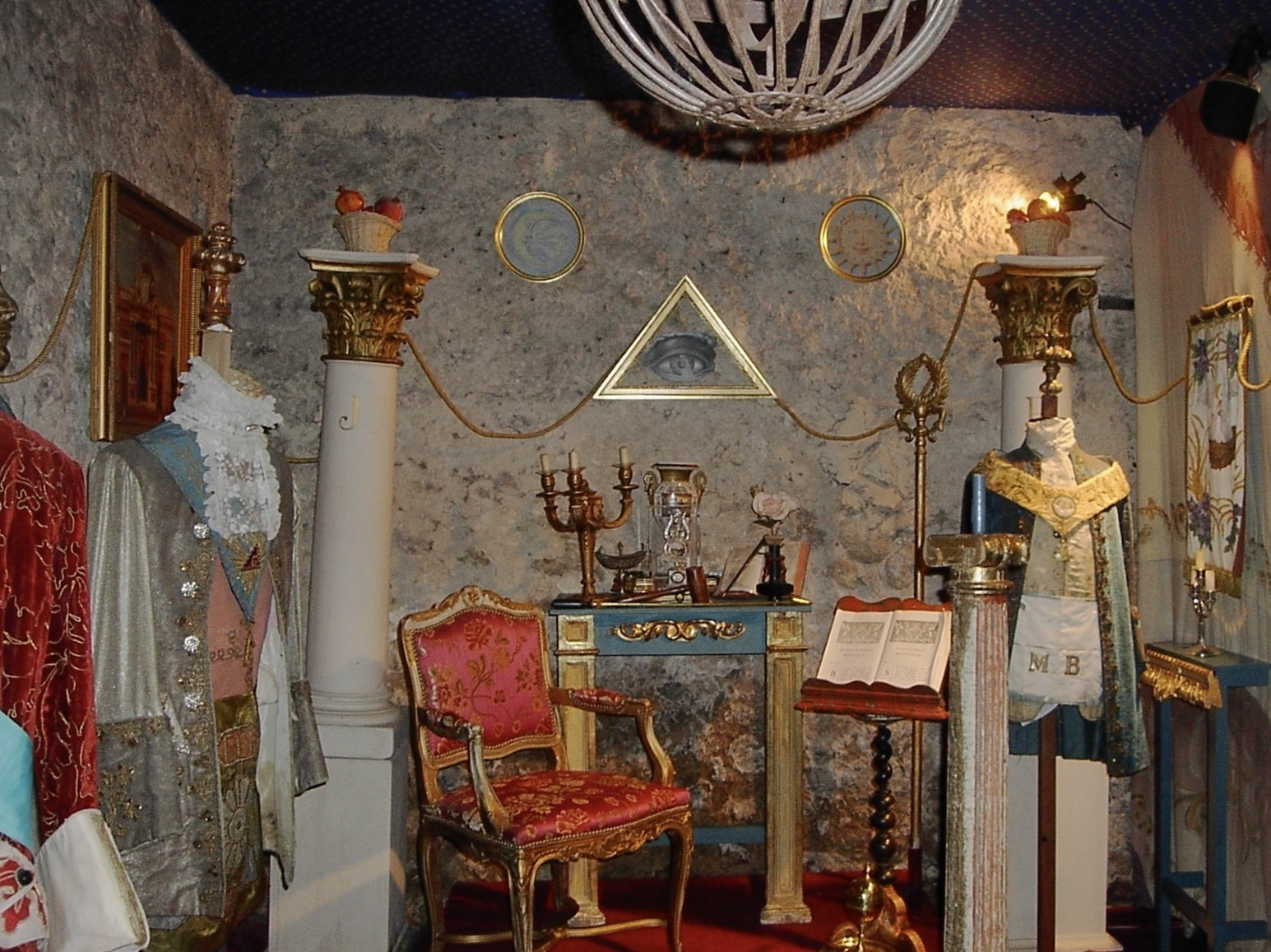
The Château's 18th century Masonic temple.

The Château de Mongenan was built in 1736 and the botanical gardens created in 1741 by the Baron de Gasq, inspired by his friend and music teacher Jean-Jacques Rousseau and the theories of the botanist Linnaeus, who believed that all plants were valuable, whether they were ornamental, medicinal, wild, or for food. The garden was made to resemble the ideal pre-romantic garden Rousseau described in Julie, la nouvelle Héloïse, full of aromas and colors. The current garden is kept as it was in the 18th century, with vegetables of the era, local varieties of fruit trees, 18th century varieties of roses, asters, iris, dahlias, aromatic plants, and plants used to make perfume. The park also includes tuberoses and jasmine.

The Château also houses a museum on Freemasonry.
