= Portets station =

Railway station in Portets, France

Portets
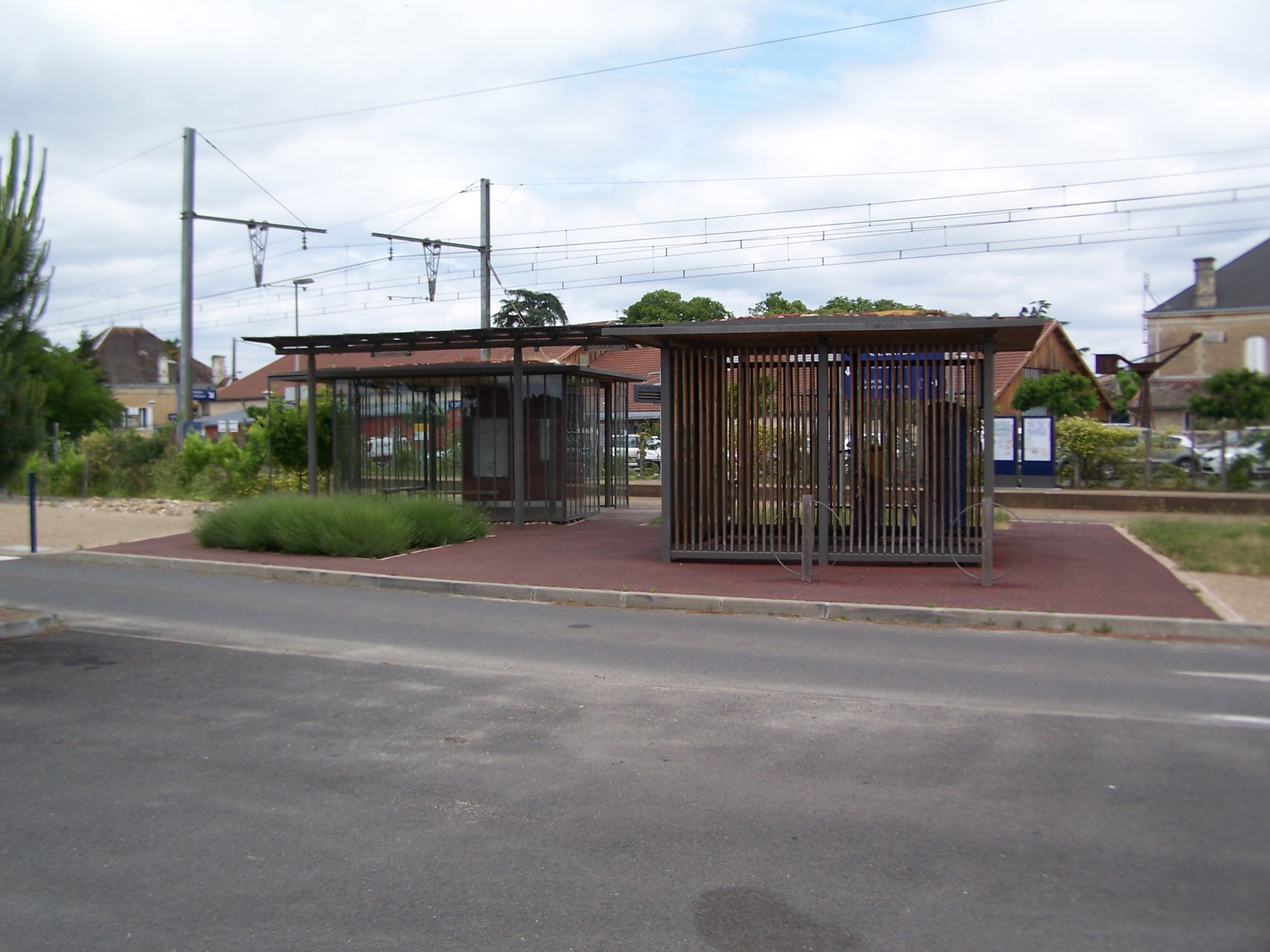
- Shelter with automatic ticket machines, a waiting room and bike racks facing the car parking lot.

General information
- Location: Allée du Merlot; 33640 Portets; Gironde; France
- Coordinates: 44°41′33″N 0°25′28″W
- Elevation: 14 metres (46 ft)
- Owner: SNCF
- Operator: SNCF
- Line: Bordeaux–Sète railway
- Distance: 20.275 kilometres (12.598 mi)
- Platforms: 2
- Tracks: 2

History
- Opened: 31 May 1855

Passengers
- 2019: 121,322

Services
Preceding station	TER Nouvelle-Aquitaine	Following station
Beautiran towards Bordeaux	43.2U	Arbanats towards Langon
Location

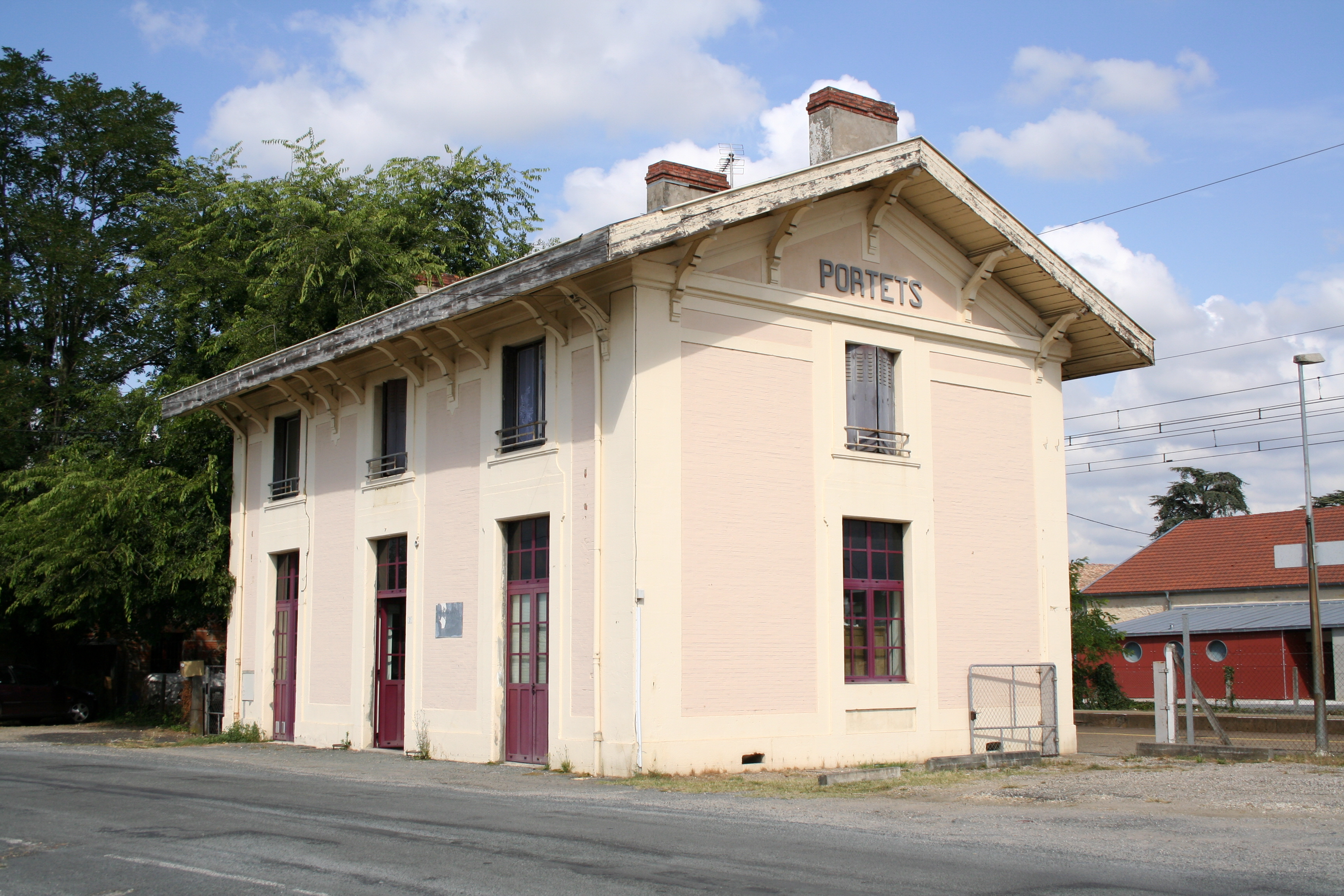
Portets station

Portets station (French: Gare de Portets) is a French railway station located in the commune of Portets, Gironde department in the southwestern Nouvelle-Aquitaine region of the country. Established at an elevation of 14 meters, the station is located at kilometric point (KP) 20.275 on the Bordeaux–Sète railway, between the stations of Beautiran and Arbanats.

As of 2023, the station is owned and operated by the SNCF and served by TER Nouvelle-Aquitaine trains.

== History ==
The station was put into service on 31 May 1855 by the Compagnie des chemins de fer du Midi et du Canal latéral à la Garonne (CF du Midi), alongside the opening of a section of railway between Bordeaux and Langon on the Bordeaux–Sète railway.

In 2019, the SNCF estimated that 121,322 passengers traveled through the station, compared with 101,476 in 2018 and 91,047 in 2017.

== Services ==
=== Passenger services ===
Classified as a PANG (point d'accès non géré), the station is unstaffed and equipped with automatic ticket dispensers.

=== Train services ===
As of 2022, the station is served by the following services:

- Local services (TER Nouvelle-Aquitaine 43.2U) Bordeaux ↔ Langon

=== Intermodality ===
The station has onsite bike racks, while car parking is located within a close proximity.

== Image gallery ==
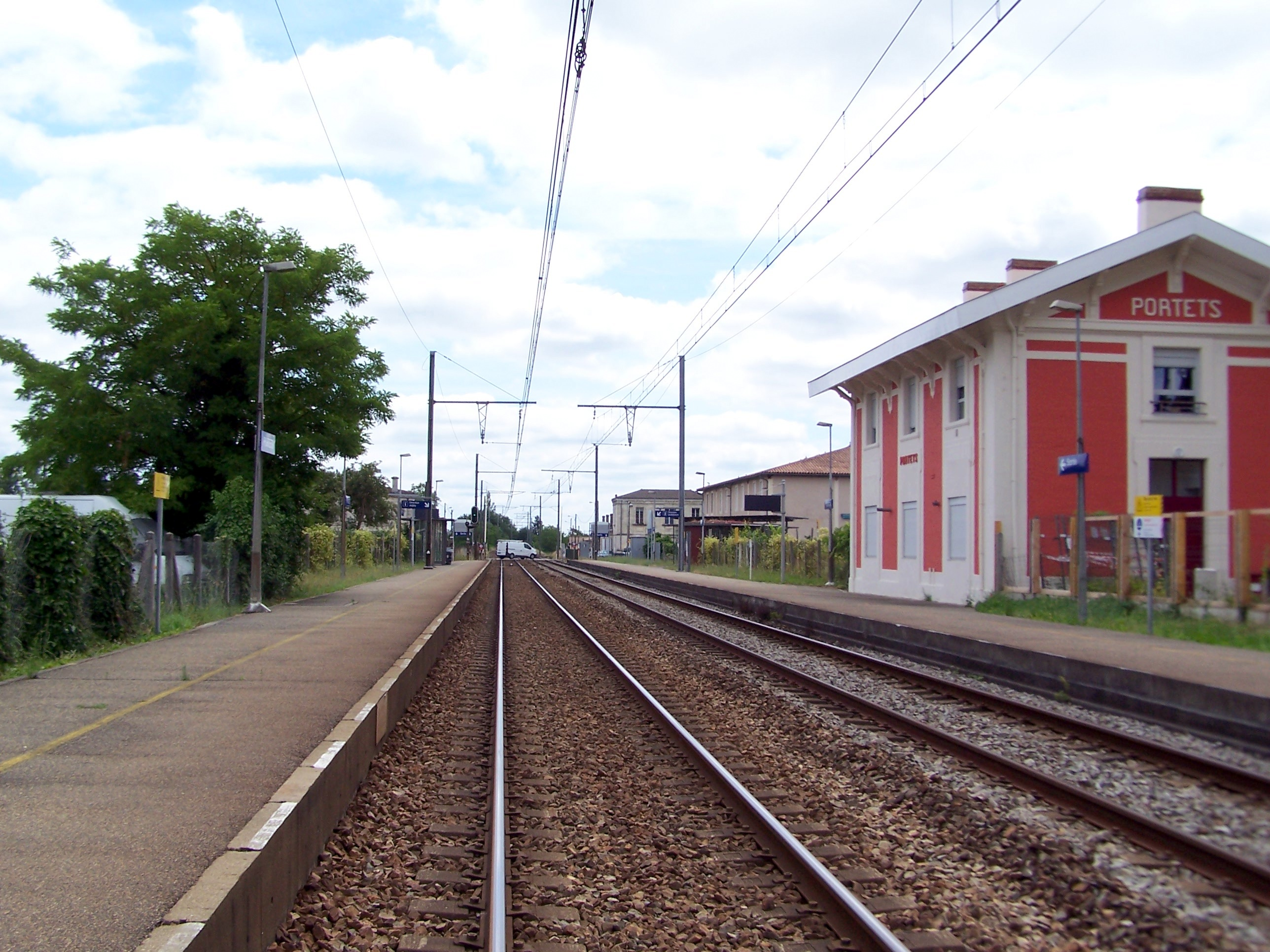
Train tracks looking towards Bordeaux.

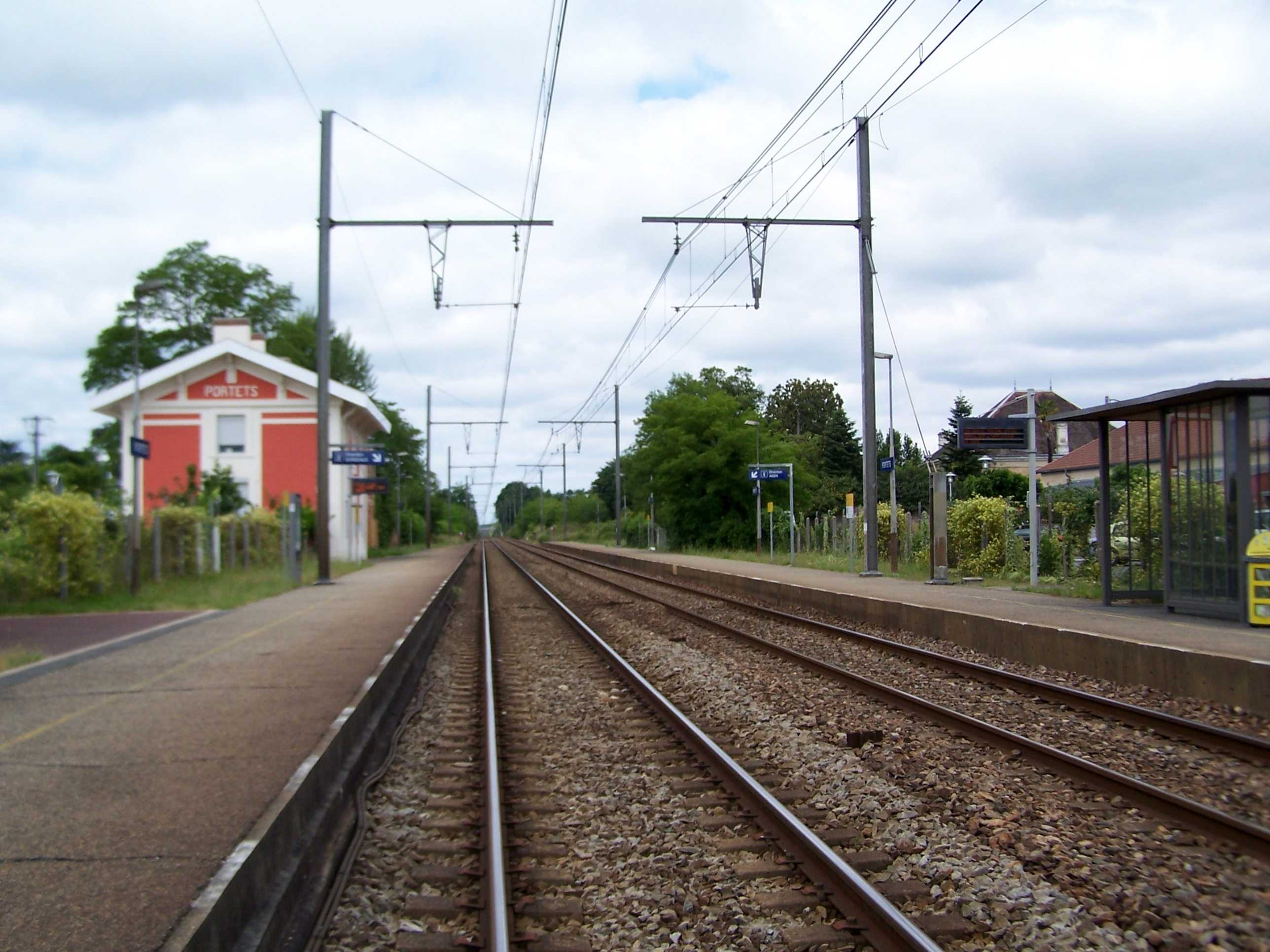
Train tracks looking towards Agen.

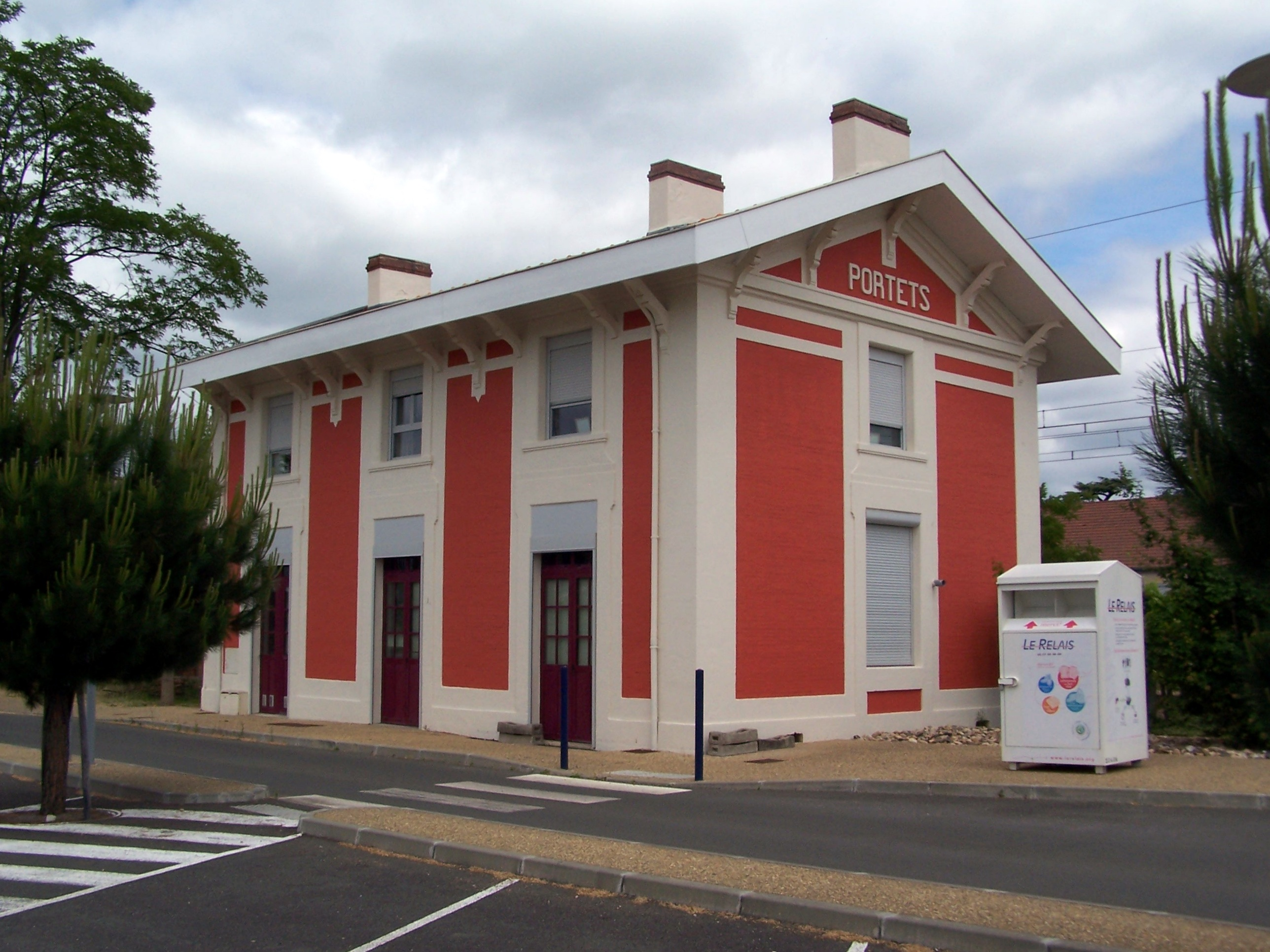
The former passenger building in Portets.

== See also ==
- List of SNCF stations in Nouvelle-Aquitaine
