= Cérons =

- Commune
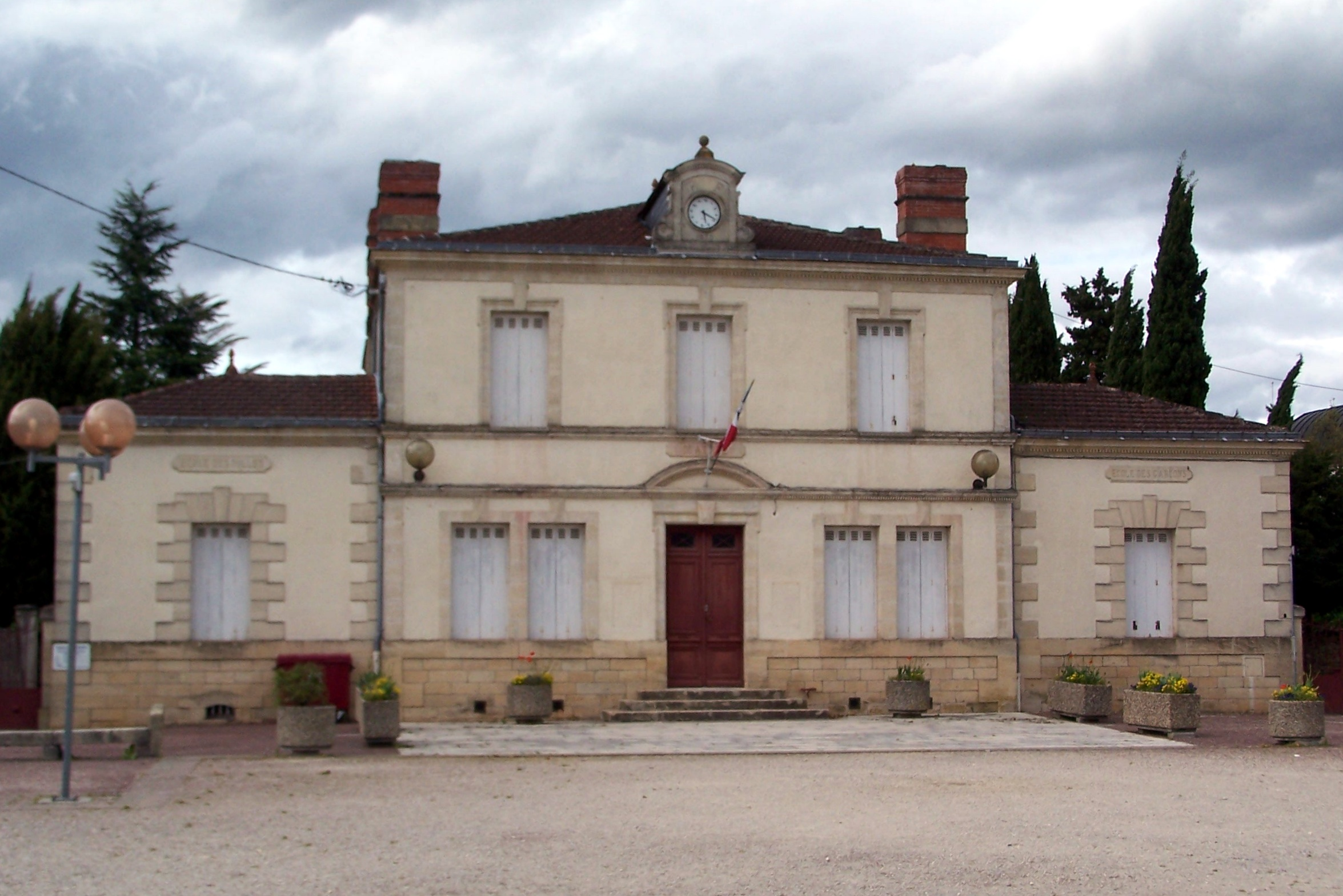
- Town hall
- Location of Cérons
- Location within France Location within Nouvelle-Aquitaine
- Coordinates: 44°37′56″N 0°20′07″W
- Country: France
- Region: Nouvelle-Aquitaine
- Department: Gironde
- Arrondissement: Langon
- Canton: Les Landes des Graves
- Intercommunality: Convergence Garonne

Government
  - Mayor (2020–2026): Jean-Patrick Soulé
- Area^{1}: 7.83 km^{2} (3.02 sq mi)
- Elevation: 14 m (46 ft)
- Highest elevation: 27 m (89 ft)
- Lowest elevation: 0 m (0 ft)
- Population (2023): 2,126
  - Density: 272/km^{2} (703/sq mi)
- Time zone: UTC+01:00 (CET)
  - Summer (DST): UTC+02:00 (CEST)
- INSEE/Postal code: 33120 /33720
- ^{1} French Land Register data, which excludes lakes, ponds, glaciers > 1 km^{2} (0.386 sq mi or 247 acres) and river estuaries.

Cérons (French pronunciation: [seʁɔ̃s]; Gascon: Seron or Serons) is a commune in the Gironde department in Nouvelle-Aquitaine in southwestern France. Cérons station has rail connections to Agen, Langon and Bordeaux.

== Population ==
Historical population
Year	Pop.	±% p.a.
1968	1,241	—
1975	1,281	+0.45%
1982	1,308	+0.30%
1990	1,319	+0.10%
1999	1,347	+0.23%
2007	1,652	+2.58%
2012	1,984	+3.73%
2017	2,084	+0.99%
2023	2,126	+0.33%
Source: INSEE

== See also ==
- Communes of the Gironde department
