= Arbanats =

- Commune
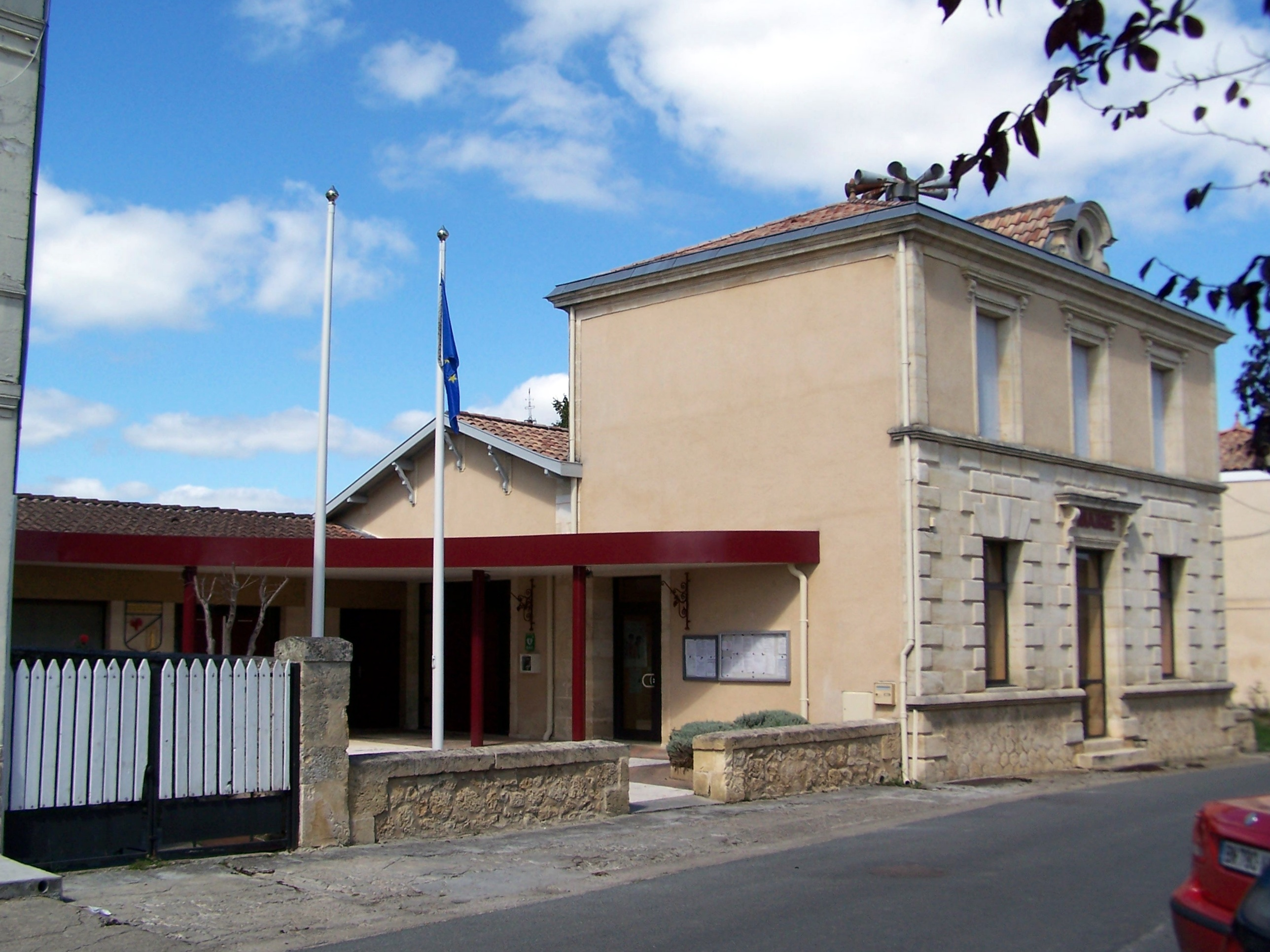
- The town hall in Arbanats

- Coat of arms
- Location of Arbanats
- Location within France Location within Nouvelle-Aquitaine
- Coordinates: 44°40′35″N 0°23′39″W
- Country: France
- Region: Nouvelle-Aquitaine
- Department: Gironde
- Arrondissement: Langon
- Canton: Les Landes des Graves

Government
  - Mayor (2020–2026): Aline Teycheney
- Area^{1}: 7.6 km^{2} (2.9 sq mi)
- Elevation: 18 m (59 ft)
- Highest elevation: 34 m (112 ft)
- Lowest elevation: 2 m (6.6 ft)
- Population (2023): 1,357
  - Density: 180/km^{2} (460/sq mi)
- Time zone: UTC+01:00 (CET)
  - Summer (DST): UTC+02:00 (CEST)
- INSEE/Postal code: 33007 /33640
- ^{1} French Land Register data, which excludes lakes, ponds, glaciers > 1 km^{2} (0.386 sq mi or 247 acres) and river estuaries.

Arbanats (French pronunciation: [aʁbanats]) is a commune of the Gironde department in southwestern France. Arbanats station has rail connections to Langon and Bordeaux.

== Population ==
Historical population
Year	Pop.	±% p.a.
1968	541	—
1975	556	+0.39%
1982	652	+2.30%
1990	757	+1.88%
1999	821	+0.91%
2007	980	+2.24%
2012	1,131	+2.91%
2017	1,272	+2.38%
2023	1,357	+1.08%
Source: INSEE

== See also ==
- Communes of the Gironde department
