= Ayguemorte-les-Graves =

- Commune
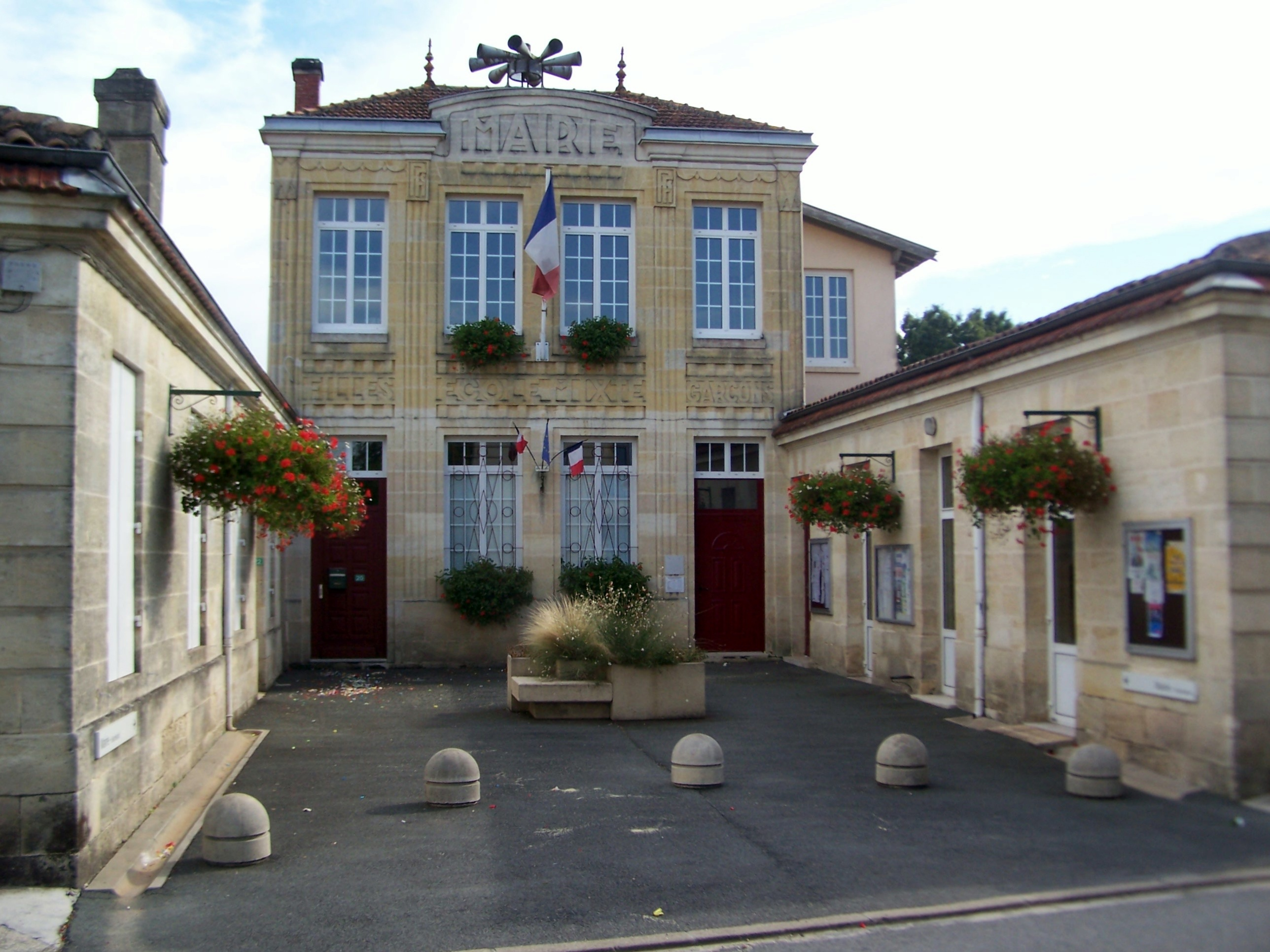
- The town hall in Ayguemorte-les-Graves

- Coat of arms
- Location of Ayguemorte-les-Graves
- Location within France Location within Nouvelle-Aquitaine
- Coordinates: 44°42′39″N 0°28′51″W
- Country: France
- Region: Nouvelle-Aquitaine
- Department: Gironde
- Arrondissement: Bordeaux
- Canton: La Brède
- Intercommunality: CC Montesquieu

Government
  - Mayor (2021–2026): Martine Talabot
- Area^{1}: 6.33 km^{2} (2.44 sq mi)
- Elevation: 13 m (43 ft)
- Highest elevation: 34 m (112 ft)
- Lowest elevation: 4 m (13 ft)
- Population (2023): 1,425
  - Density: 225/km^{2} (583/sq mi)
- Time zone: UTC+01:00 (CET)
  - Summer (DST): UTC+02:00 (CEST)
- INSEE/Postal code: 33023 /33640
- ^{1} French Land Register data, which excludes lakes, ponds, glaciers > 1 km^{2} (0.386 sq mi or 247 acres) and river estuaries.

Ayguemorte-les-Graves (French pronunciation: [ɛɡmɔʁt le ɡʁav]; Occitan: Aigamòrta de las Gravas) is a commune in the Gironde department in southwestern France.

== Population ==
Historical population
Year	Pop.	±% p.a.
1968	360	—
1975	434	+2.71%
1982	595	+4.61%
1990	696	+1.98%
1999	902	+2.92%
2007	974	+0.96%
2012	1,026	+1.05%
2017	1,256	+4.13%
2023	1,425	+2.13%
Source: INSEE

== See also ==
- Communes of the Gironde department
