= Saint-Médard-d'Eyrans =

- Commune
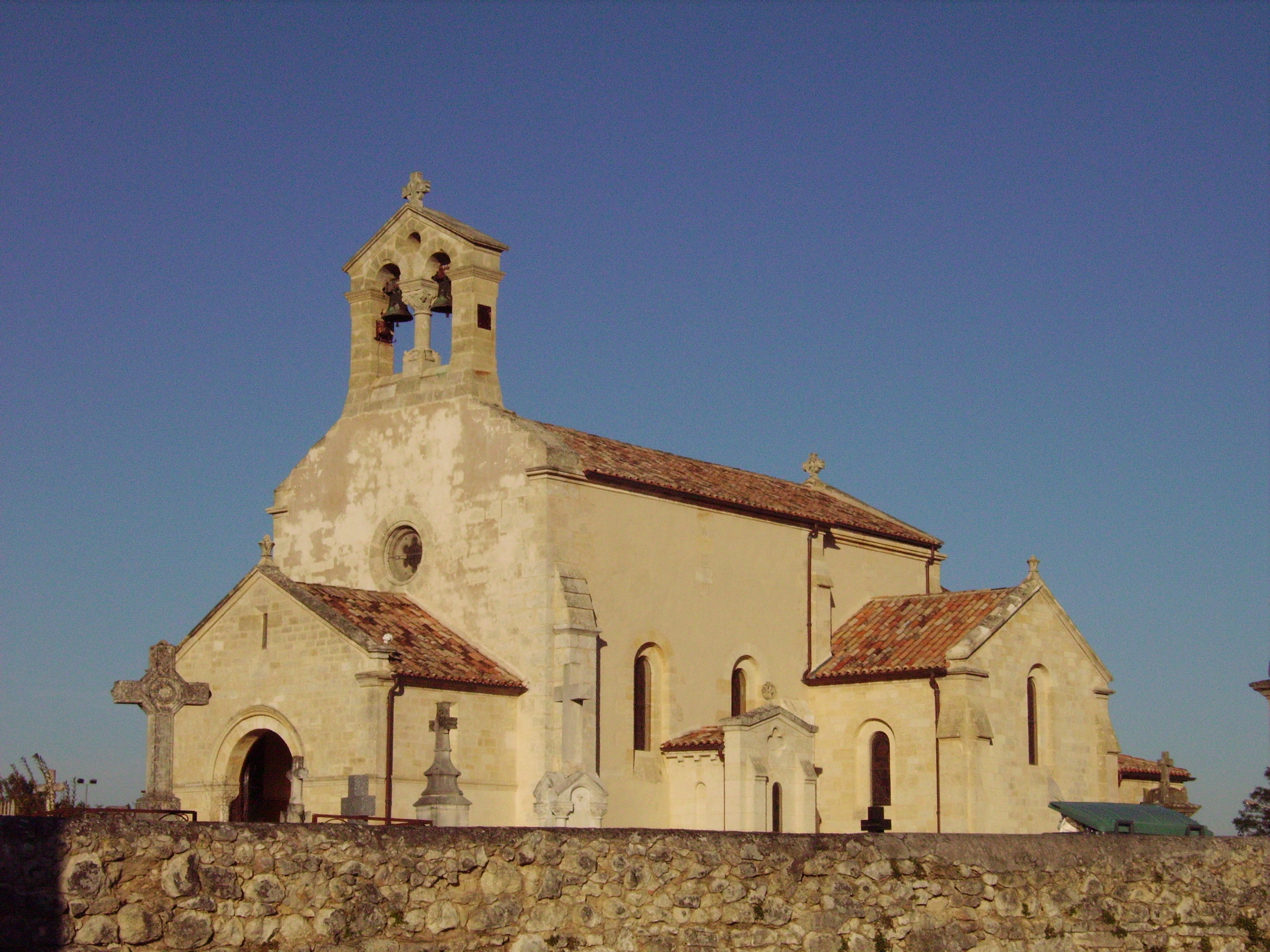
- The church in Saint-Médard-d'Eyrans

- Coat of arms
- Location of Saint-Médard-d'Eyrans
- Location within France Location within Nouvelle-Aquitaine
- Coordinates: 44°43′00″N 0°31′00″W
- Country: France
- Region: Nouvelle-Aquitaine
- Department: Gironde
- Arrondissement: Bordeaux
- Canton: La Brède
- Intercommunality: Montesquieu

Government
  - Mayor (2020–2026): Christian Tamarelle
- Area^{1}: 12.7 km^{2} (4.9 sq mi)
- Highest elevation: 51 m (167 ft)
- Lowest elevation: 3 m (9.8 ft)
- Population (2023): 3,409
  - Density: 268/km^{2} (695/sq mi)
- Time zone: UTC+01:00 (CET)
  - Summer (DST): UTC+02:00 (CEST)
- INSEE/Postal code: 33448 /33650
- ^{1} French Land Register data, which excludes lakes, ponds, glaciers > 1 km^{2} (0.386 sq mi or 247 acres) and river estuaries.

Saint-Médard-d'Eyrans (French pronunciation: [sɛ̃ medaʁ dɛʁɑ̃]; Gascon: Sent Medard d'Airans) is a commune in the Gironde department in Nouvelle-Aquitaine in southwestern France. Saint-Médard-d'Eyrans station has rail connections to Langon and Bordeaux.

== Population ==
Historical population
Year	Pop.	±% p.a.
1968	1,109	—
1975	1,330	+2.63%
1982	1,490	+1.64%
1990	2,033	+3.96%
1999	2,277	+1.27%
2007	2,650	+1.91%
2012	2,872	+1.62%
2017	2,971	+0.68%
2023	3,409	+2.32%
Source: INSEE

== See also ==
- Communes of the Gironde department
- Pessac-Léognan
- Communes of the Gironde department
