= Barsac station =

Railway station in Barsac, Nouvelle-Aquitaine, France

Coordinates: 44°36′18″N 0°19′14″W

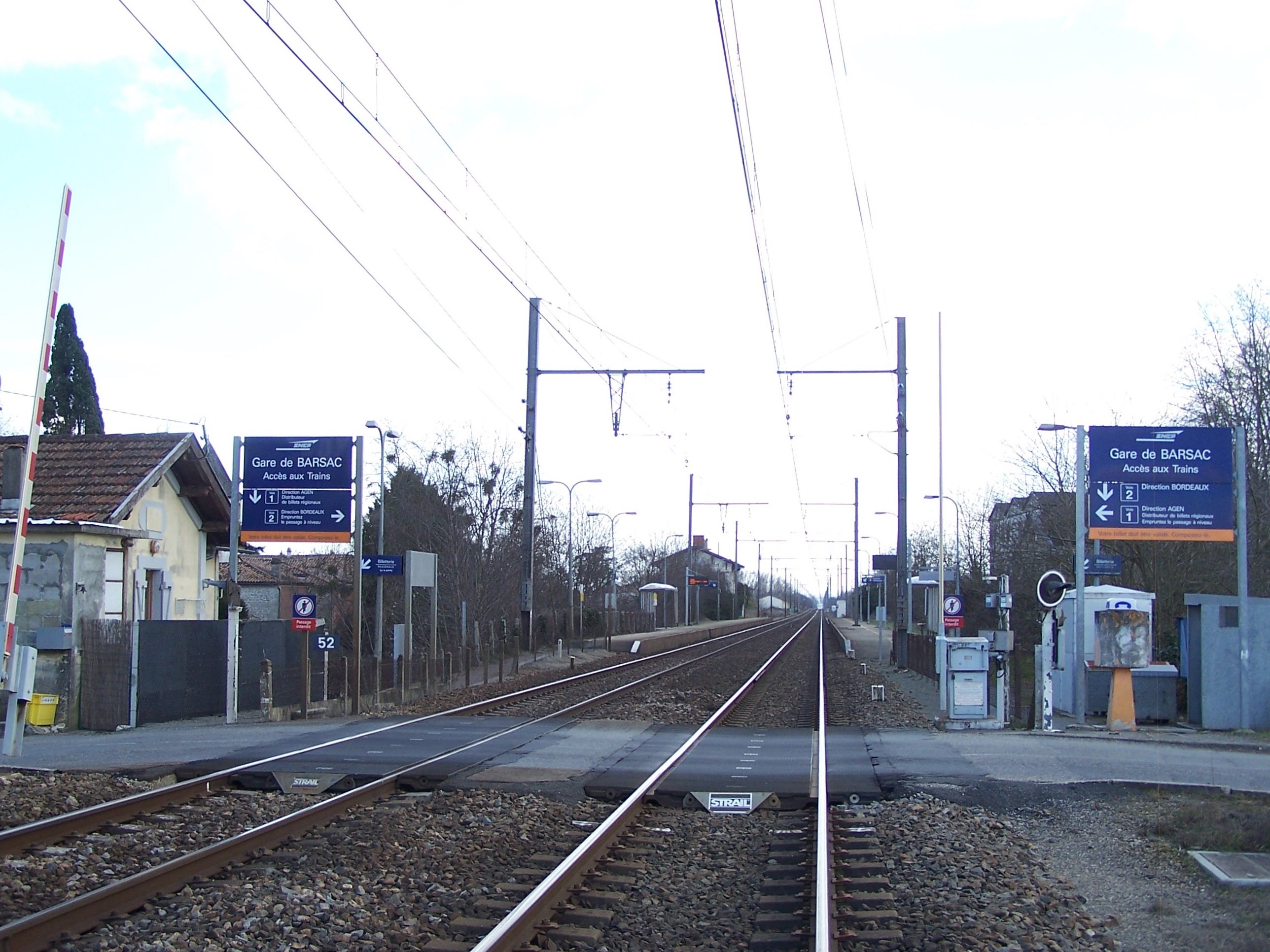
Gare de Barsac

Barsac station (French: Gare de Barsac) is a railway station in Barsac, Nouvelle-Aquitaine, France. The station is located on the Bordeaux–Sète railway line. The station is served by TER (local) services operated by SNCF.

== Train services ==
The following services currently call at Barsac:

- local service (TER Nouvelle-Aquitaine) Bordeaux - Langon

Preceding station	TER Nouvelle-Aquitaine	Following station
Cérons towards Bordeaux	43.2U	Preignac towards Langon
