= Barsacq =

Barsacq is a French surname. Notable people with the surname include:

- André Barsacq (1909–1973), French theatre director
- Léon Barsacq (1906–1969), Russian-born French production designer
- Marie Amachoukeli-Barsacq (born 1979), French film director
- Yves Barsacq (1931–2015), French film actor

== See also ==
- Barsac (disambiguation)
