= Saucats =

- Commune
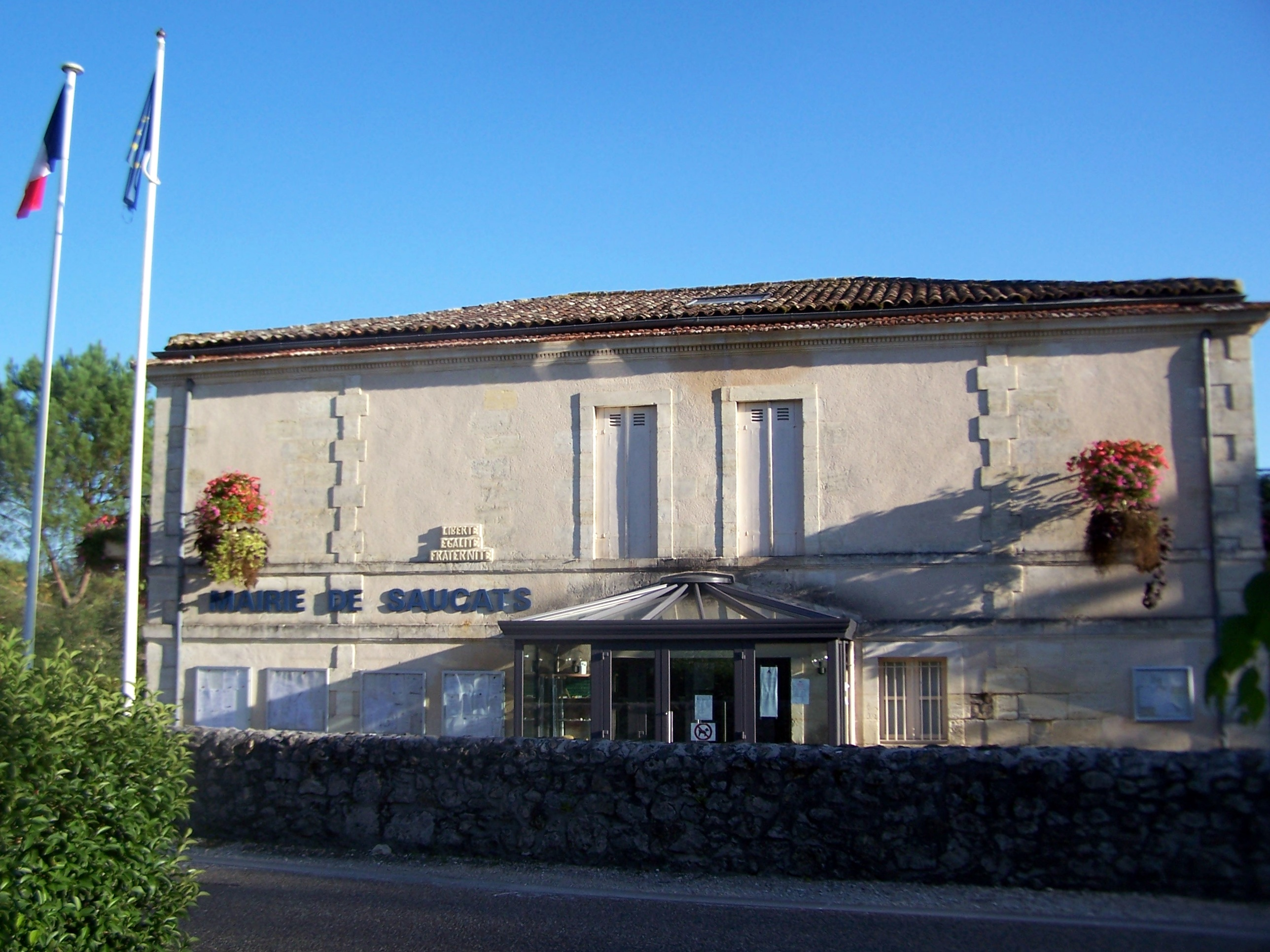
- The town hall in Saucats
- Location of Saucats
- Location within France Location within Nouvelle-Aquitaine
- Coordinates: 44°39′11″N 0°35′42″W
- Country: France
- Region: Nouvelle-Aquitaine
- Department: Gironde
- Arrondissement: Bordeaux
- Canton: La Brède
- Intercommunality: Montesquieu

Government
  - Mayor (2023–2026): Mélanie Tichané
- Area^{1}: 89.15 km^{2} (34.42 sq mi)
- Elevation: 50 m (160 ft)
- Highest elevation: 70 m (230 ft)
- Lowest elevation: 24 m (79 ft)
- Population (2023): 3,548
  - Density: 39.80/km^{2} (103.1/sq mi)
- Time zone: UTC+01:00 (CET)
  - Summer (DST): UTC+02:00 (CEST)
- INSEE/Postal code: 33501 /33650
- ^{1} French Land Register data, which excludes lakes, ponds, glaciers > 1 km^{2} (0.386 sq mi or 247 acres) and river estuaries.

Saucats (French pronunciation: [sokats]) is a commune in the Gironde department in Nouvelle-Aquitaine in southwestern France.

== Population ==
Historical population
Year	Pop.	±% p.a.
1968	578	—
1975	709	+2.96%
1982	1,054	+5.83%
1990	1,514	+4.63%
1999	1,655	+0.99%
2007	1,980	+2.27%
2012	2,230	+2.41%
2017	3,056	+6.50%
2023	3,548	+2.52%
Source: INSEE

== See also ==
- Communes of the Gironde department
