= Preignac =

- Commune
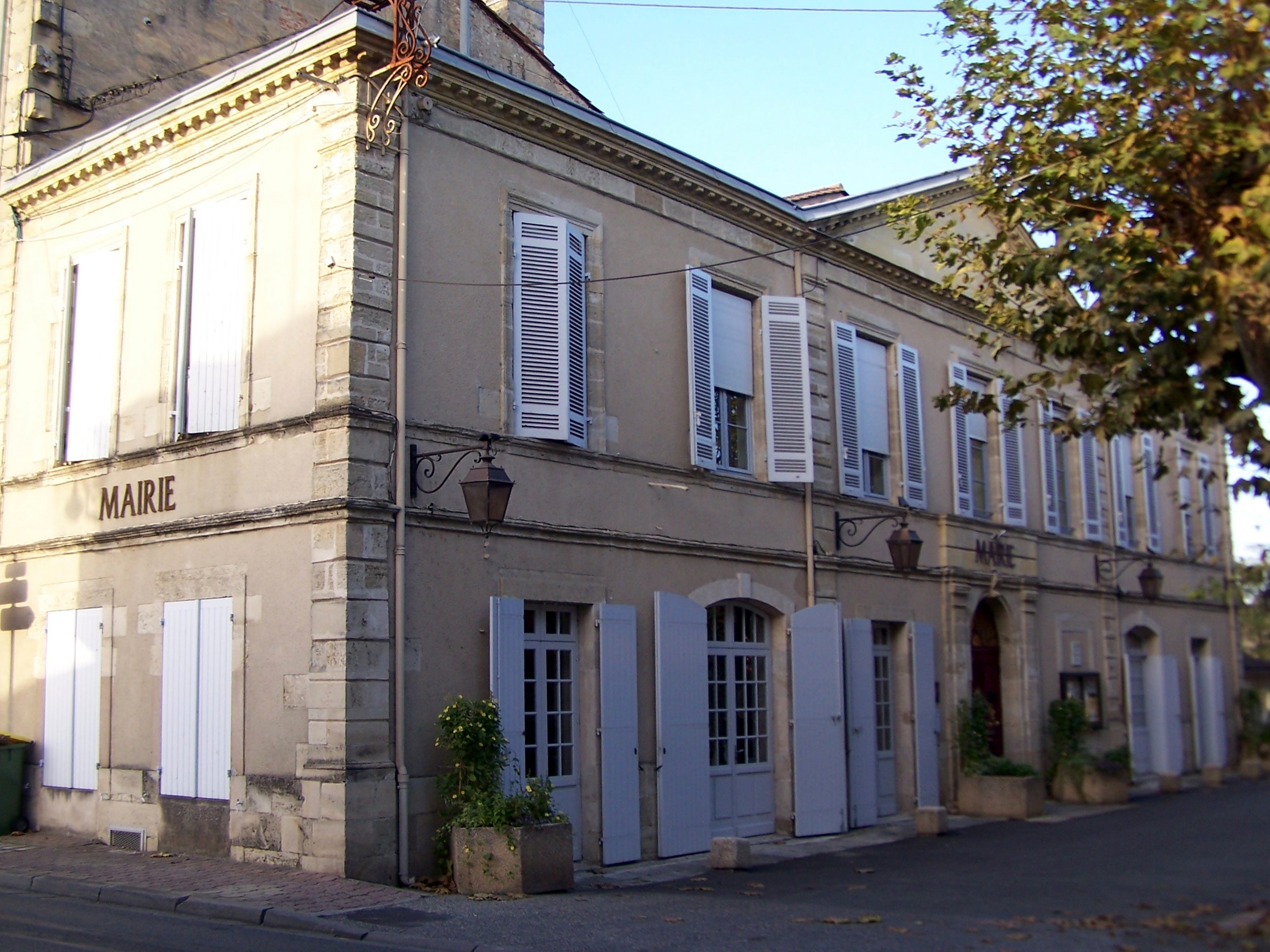
- Town hall

- Coat of arms
- Location of Preignac
- Location within France Location within Nouvelle-Aquitaine
- Coordinates: 44°35′09″N 0°17′39″W
- Country: France
- Region: Nouvelle-Aquitaine
- Department: Gironde
- Arrondissement: Langon
- Canton: Les Landes des Graves
- Intercommunality: Convergence Garonne

Government
  - Mayor (2020–2026): Thomas Filliatre
- Area^{1}: 13.26 km^{2} (5.12 sq mi)
- Elevation: 15 m (49 ft)
- Highest elevation: 59 m (194 ft)
- Lowest elevation: 2 m (6.6 ft)
- Population (2023): 2,135
  - Density: 161.0/km^{2} (417.0/sq mi)
- Time zone: UTC+01:00 (CET)
  - Summer (DST): UTC+02:00 (CEST)
- INSEE/Postal code: 33337 /33210
- ^{1} French Land Register data, which excludes lakes, ponds, glaciers > 1 km^{2} (0.386 sq mi or 247 acres) and river estuaries.

Preignac (French pronunciation: [pʁɛɲak]) is a commune in the Gironde department in Nouvelle-Aquitaine in southwestern France.

Preignac is located in the Sauternes wine appellation of Bordeaux. Preignac station has rail connections to Langon and Bordeaux.

== Population ==
Historical population
Year	Pop.	±% p.a.
1968	2,227	—
1975	2,096	−0.86%
1982	1,958	−0.97%
1990	1,992	+0.22%
1999	2,026	+0.19%
2007	2,148	+0.73%
2012	2,179	+0.29%
2017	2,140	−0.36%
2023	2,135	−0.04%
Source: INSEE

== See also ==
- Communes of the Gironde department
