= Isle-Saint-Georges =

- Commune
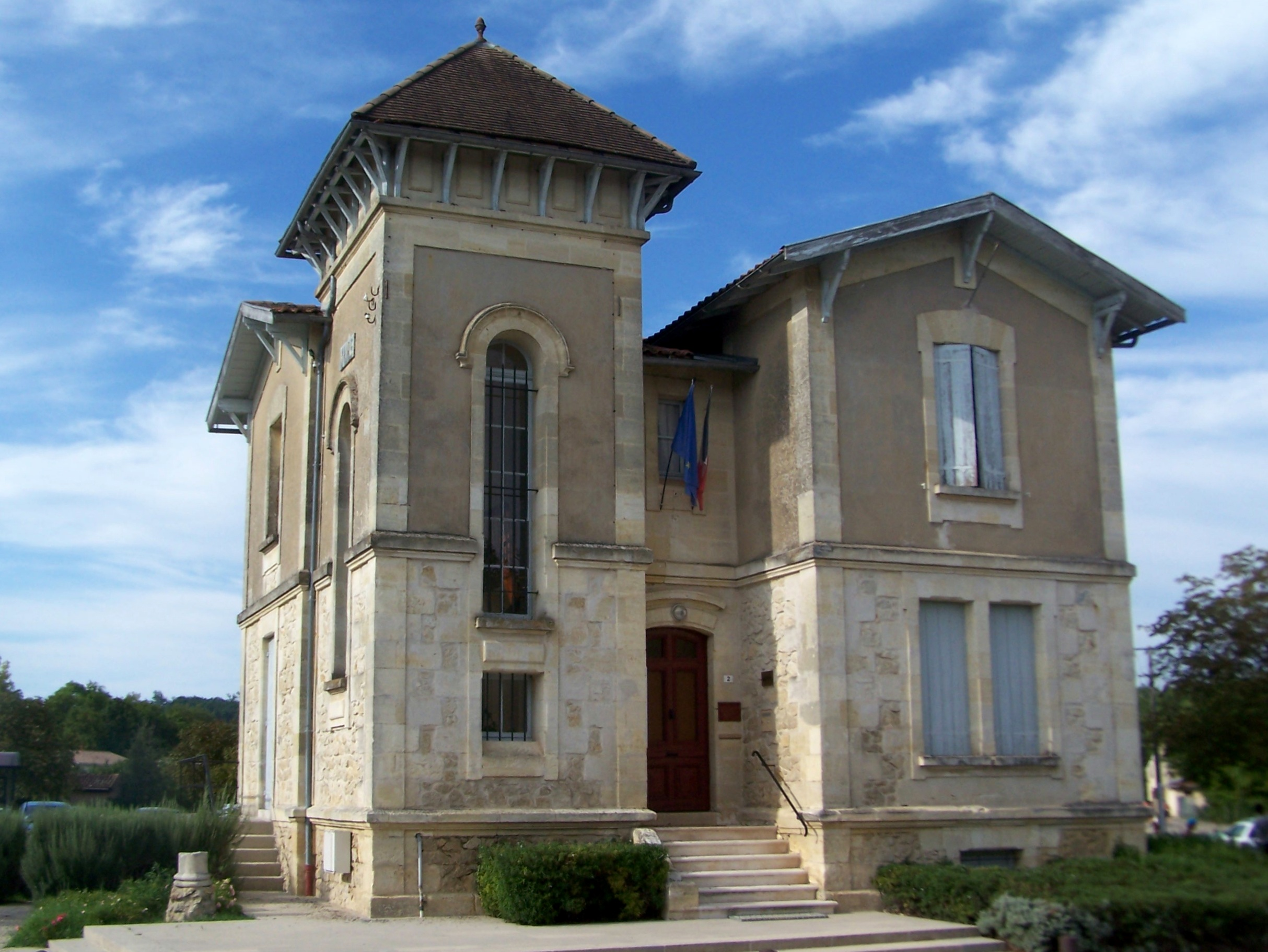
- The town hall in Isle-Saint-Georges

- Coat of arms
- Location of Isle-Saint-Georges
- Location within France Location within Nouvelle-Aquitaine
- Coordinates: 44°43′33″N 0°28′22″W
- Country: France
- Region: Nouvelle-Aquitaine
- Department: Gironde
- Arrondissement: Bordeaux
- Canton: La Brède
- Intercommunality: Montesquieu

Government
  - Mayor (2023–2026): Stéphanie Daubanes
- Area^{1}: 4.35 km^{2} (1.68 sq mi)
- Elevation: 4 m (13 ft)
- Highest elevation: 5 m (16 ft)
- Lowest elevation: 2 m (6.6 ft)
- Population (2023): 502
  - Density: 115/km^{2} (299/sq mi)
- Time zone: UTC+01:00 (CET)
  - Summer (DST): UTC+02:00 (CEST)
- INSEE/Postal code: 33206 /33640
- ^{1} French Land Register data, which excludes lakes, ponds, glaciers > 1 km^{2} (0.386 sq mi or 247 acres) and river estuaries.

Isle-Saint-Georges (French pronunciation: [il sɛ̃ ʒɔʁʒ]; Occitan: L'Isla Sent Jòrgi) is a commune in the Gironde department in Nouvelle-Aquitaine in southwestern France.

== Population ==
Historical population
Year	Pop.	±% p.a.
1968	442	—
1975	501	+1.81%
1982	510	+0.25%
1990	541	+0.74%
1999	522	−0.40%
2007	533	+0.26%
2012	541	+0.30%
2017	522	−0.71%
2023	502	−0.65%
Source: INSEE

== See also ==
- Communes of the Gironde department
