= Saint-Morillon =

- Commune
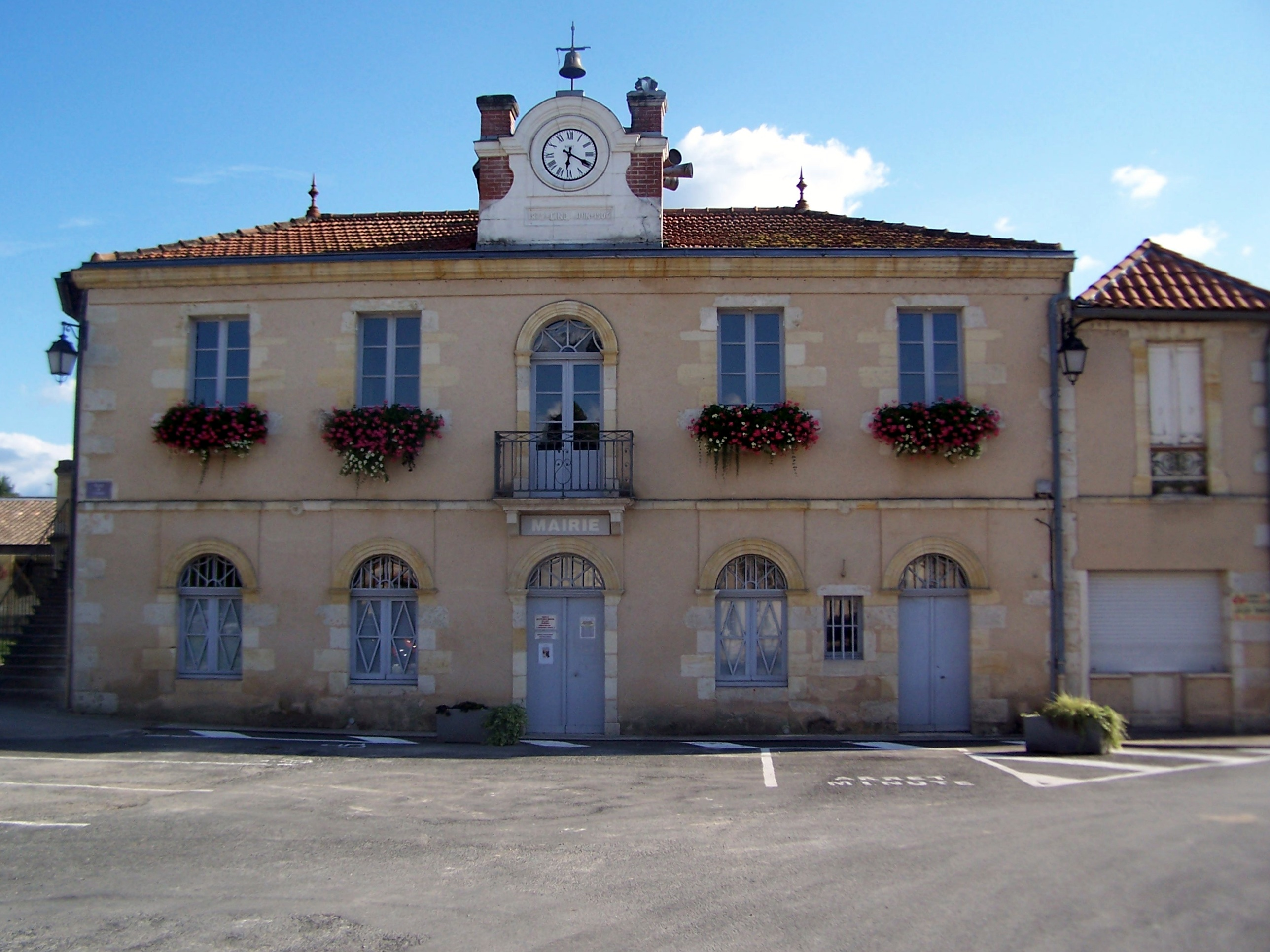
- The town hall in Saint-Morillon
- Location of Saint-Morillon
- Location within France Location within Nouvelle-Aquitaine
- Coordinates: 44°39′02″N 0°30′05″W
- Country: France
- Region: Nouvelle-Aquitaine
- Department: Gironde
- Arrondissement: Bordeaux
- Canton: La Brède
- Intercommunality: Montesquieu

Government
  - Mayor (2020–2026): Laurence Bourgade
- Area^{1}: 20.4 km^{2} (7.9 sq mi)
- Elevation: 6 m (20 ft)
- Highest elevation: 67 m (220 ft)
- Lowest elevation: 15 m (49 ft)
- Population (2023): 1,834
  - Density: 89.9/km^{2} (233/sq mi)
- Time zone: UTC+01:00 (CET)
  - Summer (DST): UTC+02:00 (CEST)
- INSEE/Postal code: 33454 /33650
- ^{1} French Land Register data, which excludes lakes, ponds, glaciers > 1 km^{2} (0.386 sq mi or 247 acres) and river estuaries.

Saint-Morillon (French pronunciation: [sɛ̃ mɔʁijɔ̃]; Gascon: Sent Maurilhon) is a commune in the Gironde department in Nouvelle-Aquitaine in southwestern France.

== Population ==
Historical population
Year	Pop.	±% p.a.
1968	507	—
1975	566	+1.59%
1982	722	+3.54%
1990	846	+2.00%
1999	1,083	+2.78%
2007	1,394	+3.21%
2012	1,542	+2.04%
2017	1,694	+1.90%
2023	1,834	+1.33%
Source: INSEE

== See also ==
- Communes of the Gironde department
