= Beautiran =

- Commune
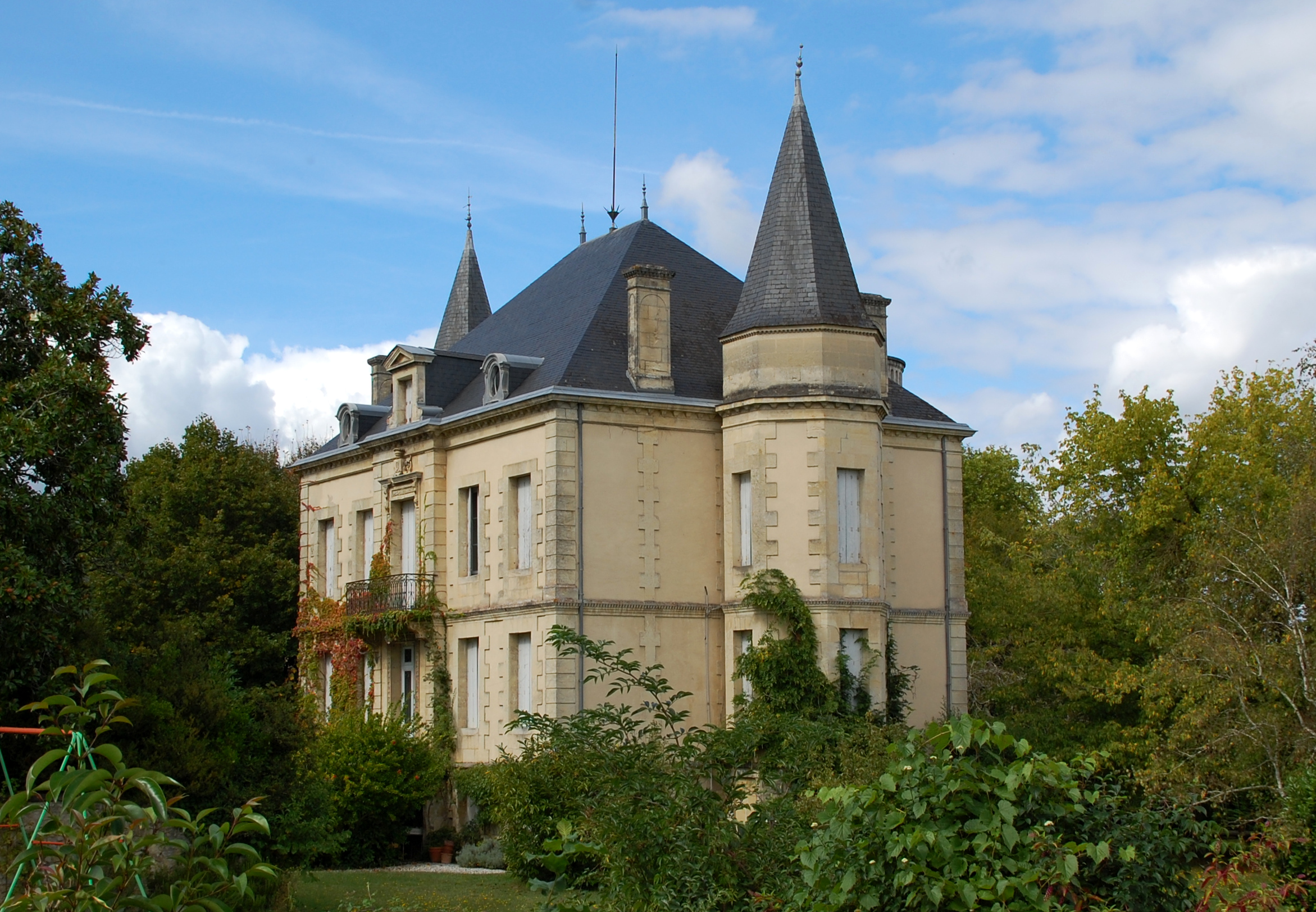
- Chateau

- Coat of arms
- Location of Beautiran
- Location within France Location within Nouvelle-Aquitaine
- Coordinates: 44°42′16″N 0°27′03″W
- Country: France
- Region: Nouvelle-Aquitaine
- Department: Gironde
- Arrondissement: Bordeaux
- Canton: La Brède
- Intercommunality: Montesquieu

Government
  - Mayor (2020–2026): Philippe Barrère
- Area^{1}: 6.35 km^{2} (2.45 sq mi)
- Elevation: 8 m (26 ft)
- Highest elevation: 22 m (72 ft)
- Lowest elevation: 3 m (9.8 ft)
- Population (2023): 2,488
  - Density: 392/km^{2} (1,010/sq mi)
- Time zone: UTC+01:00 (CET)
  - Summer (DST): UTC+02:00 (CEST)
- INSEE/Postal code: 33037 /33640
- ^{1} French Land Register data, which excludes lakes, ponds, glaciers > 1 km^{2} (0.386 sq mi or 247 acres) and river estuaries.

Beautiran (French pronunciation: [botiʁɑ̃]; Gascon: Bautiran) is a commune in the Gironde department in southwestern France. Beautiran station has rail connections to Agen, Langon and Bordeaux.

== Population ==
Historical population
Year	Pop.	±% p.a.
1968	1,214	—
1975	1,353	+1.56%
1982	1,416	+0.65%
1990	1,803	+3.07%
1999	2,038	+1.37%
2007	2,125	+0.52%
2012	2,169	+0.41%
2017	2,267	+0.89%
2023	2,488	+1.56%
Source: INSEE

== See also ==
- Communes of the Gironde department
