= Cérons station =

Railway station in Cérons, France

Coordinates: 44°37′55″N 0°20′26″W

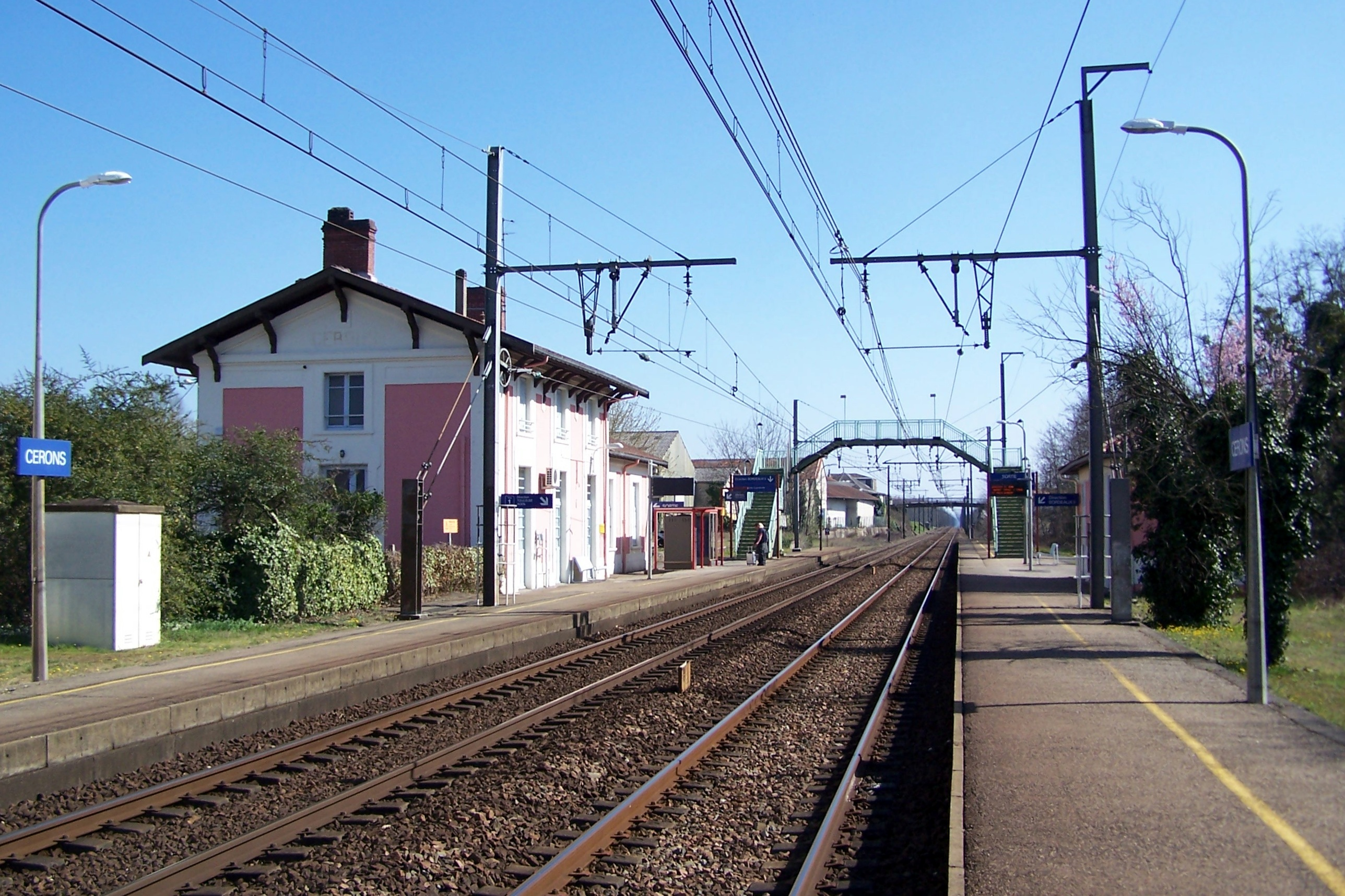
Cérons station

Cérons is a railway station in Cérons, Nouvelle-Aquitaine, France. The station is located on the Bordeaux–Sète railway line. The station is served by TER (local) services operated by SNCF.

== Train services ==
The following services currently call at Cérons:

- local service (TER Nouvelle-Aquitaine) Bordeaux - Langon - Marmande - Agen

Preceding station	TER Nouvelle-Aquitaine	Following station
Podensac towards Bordeaux	43.2U	Barsac towards Langon
Beautiran towards Bordeaux	44	Langon towards Agen
