= Castres-Gironde =

- Commune
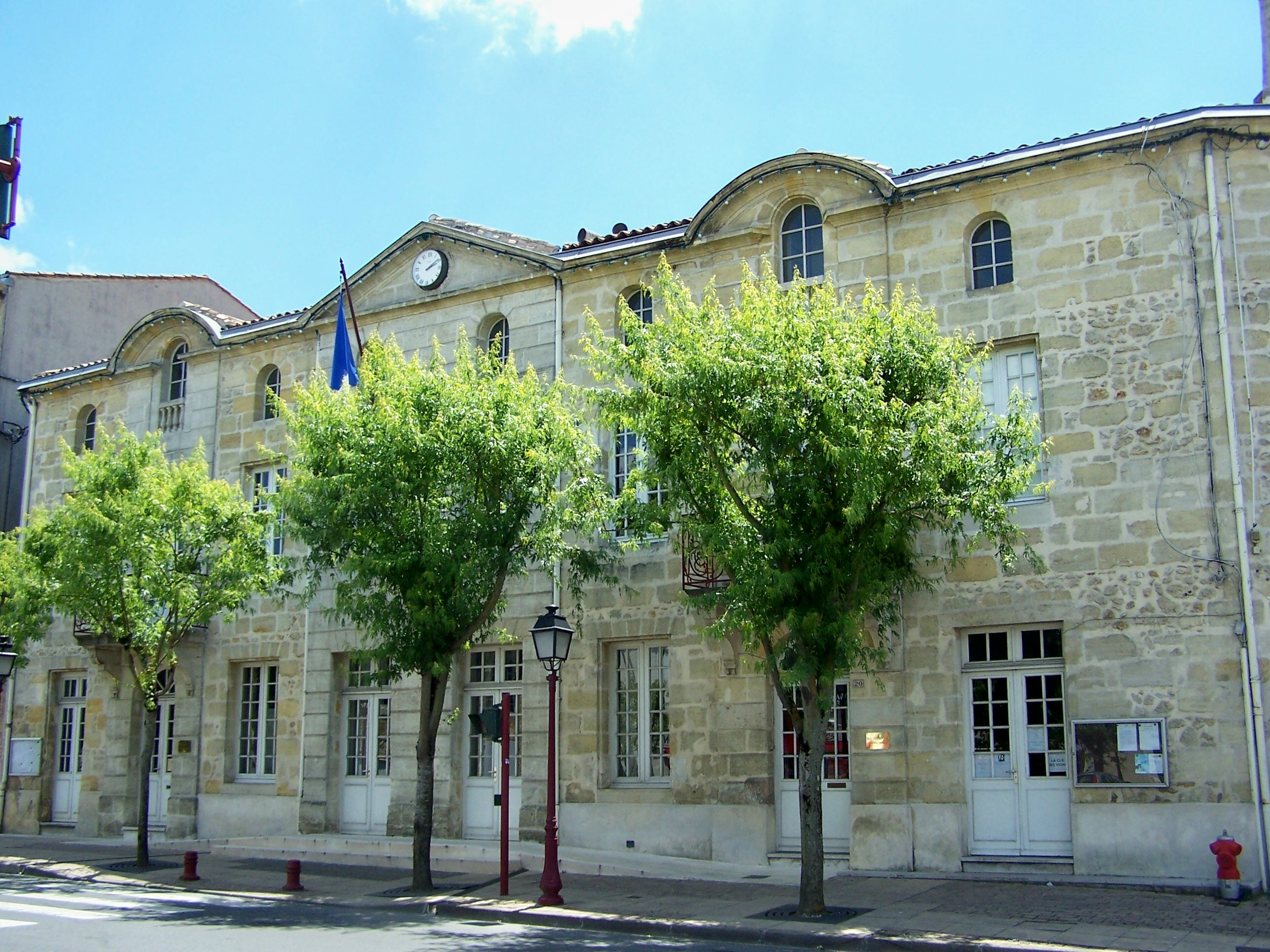
- Town hall

- Coat of arms
- Location of Castres-Gironde
- Location within France Location within Nouvelle-Aquitaine
- Coordinates: 44°41′50″N 0°26′37″W
- Country: France
- Region: Nouvelle-Aquitaine
- Department: Gironde
- Arrondissement: Bordeaux
- Canton: La Brède
- Intercommunality: Montesquieu

Government
  - Mayor (2020–2026): Gracia Perez
- Area^{1}: 6.97 km^{2} (2.69 sq mi)
- Elevation: 20 m (66 ft)
- Highest elevation: 32 m (105 ft)
- Lowest elevation: 3 m (9.8 ft)
- Population (2023): 2,695
  - Density: 387/km^{2} (1,000/sq mi)
- Time zone: UTC+01:00 (CET)
  - Summer (DST): UTC+02:00 (CEST)
- INSEE/Postal code: 33109 /33640
- ^{1} French Land Register data, which excludes lakes, ponds, glaciers > 1 km^{2} (0.386 sq mi or 247 acres) and river estuaries.

Castres-Gironde (French pronunciation: [kastʁ ʒiʁɔ̃d]; Occitan: Castra) is a commune in the Gironde department in Nouvelle-Aquitaine in southwestern France.

== Population ==
Historical population
Year	Pop.	±% p.a.
1968	904	—
1975	1,074	+2.49%
1982	1,211	+1.73%
1990	1,349	+1.36%
1999	1,512	+1.28%
2007	1,922	+3.04%
2012	2,179	+2.54%
2017	2,352	+1.54%
2023	2,695	+2.29%
Source: INSEE

== See also ==
- Communes of the Gironde department
