= Joseph Antoine Cervini =

Joseph Antoine Cervini was an author who provided the text for a book titled Voyage Pittoresque dans les Pyrénées Françaises et les Départements Adjacents, (Picturesque Travels in the French Pyrenees and the Adjacent Areas), Treuttel and Wurtz, Paris: 1826-30, (Bibliographie nationale Française, BnF, The French national Bibliography ISBN 2-911715-12-8). This book documents the journey of Antoine Ignace Melling, who was sent by the French Government to document the Pyrenees, and to demonstrate that their natural beauty rivalled that of the Alps. The book includes 72 fine aquatints, based on original sepia watercolours.

Voyage pittoresque de Constantinople et des rives du Bosphore (paperback), the Elibron Classics book, is a facsimile reprint of the 1826 edition by Aug. Wahlen, Bruxelles. Adamant Media Corporation (May 3, 2001) in French. ISBN 0-543-97318-2 ISBN 978-0543973184.
