= Portets =

- Commune
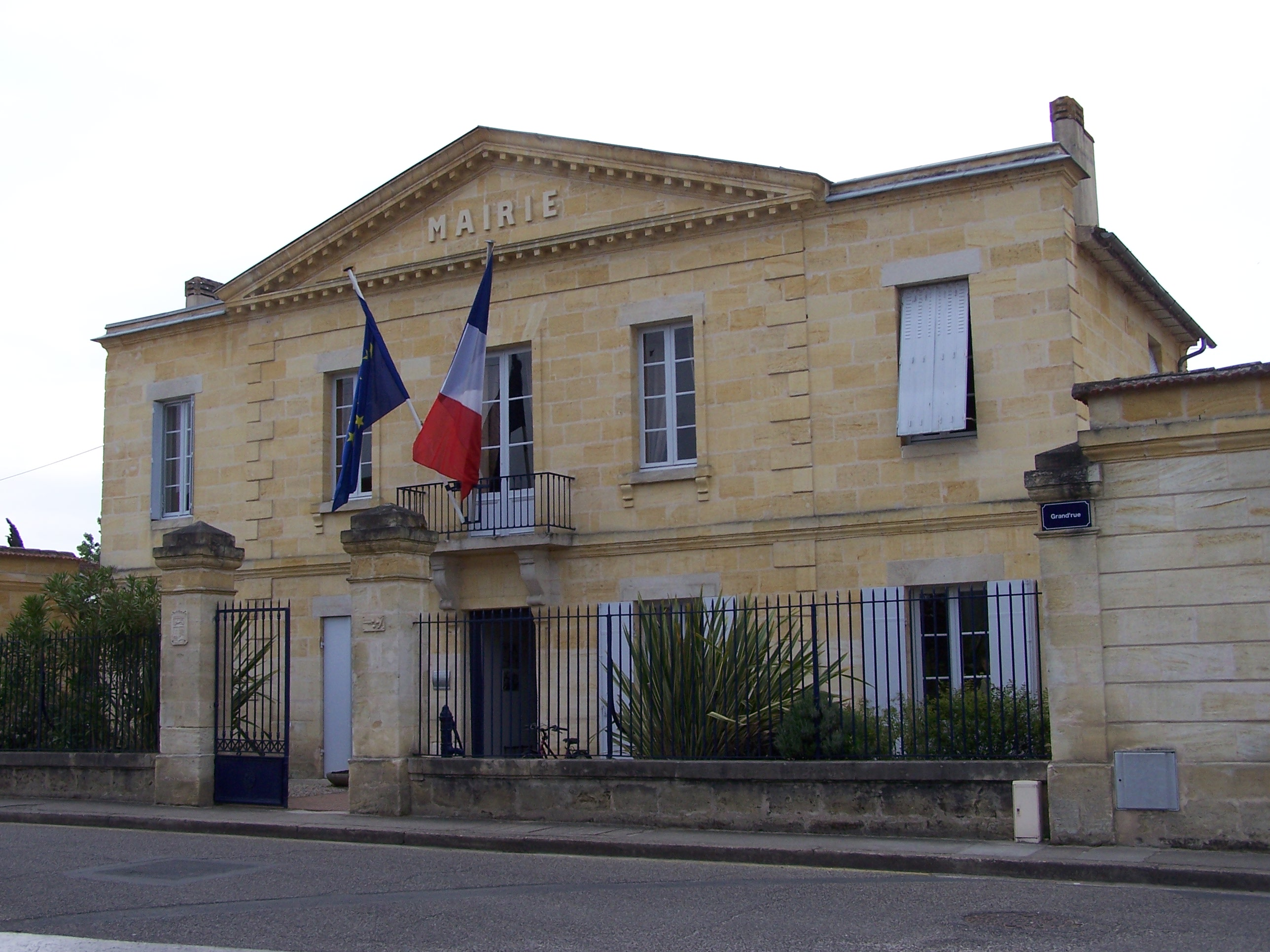
- Town hall

- Coat of arms
- Location of Portets
- Location within France Location within Nouvelle-Aquitaine
- Coordinates: 44°41′52″N 0°25′23″W
- Country: France
- Region: Nouvelle-Aquitaine
- Department: Gironde
- Arrondissement: Langon
- Canton: Les Landes des Graves
- Intercommunality: Convergence Garonne

Government
  - Mayor (2020–2026): Didier Cazimajou
- Area^{1}: 15.49 km^{2} (5.98 sq mi)
- Elevation: 10 m (33 ft)
- Highest elevation: 37 m (121 ft)
- Lowest elevation: 2 m (6.6 ft)
- Population (2023): 2,618
  - Density: 169.0/km^{2} (437.7/sq mi)
- Time zone: UTC+01:00 (CET)
  - Summer (DST): UTC+02:00 (CEST)
- INSEE/Postal code: 33334 /33640
- ^{1} French Land Register data, which excludes lakes, ponds, glaciers > 1 km^{2} (0.386 sq mi or 247 acres) and river estuaries.

Portets (French pronunciation: [pɔʁtɛts]; Gascon: Portèth) is a commune in the Gironde department in Nouvelle-Aquitaine in southwestern France. Portets station has rail connections to Langon and Bordeaux.

== Population ==
Historical population
Year	Pop.	±% p.a.
1968	1,889	—
1975	1,997	+0.80%
1982	2,030	+0.23%
1990	2,008	−0.14%
1999	2,001	−0.04%
2007	2,195	+1.16%
2012	2,525	+2.84%
2017	2,702	+1.36%
2023	2,618	−0.52%
Source: INSEE

== See also ==
- Château de Mongenan, a chateau and botanical garden
- Communes of the Gironde department
