= Renada-Laura Portet =

Writer (1927–1921)

Renada-Laura Calmon-Ouillet
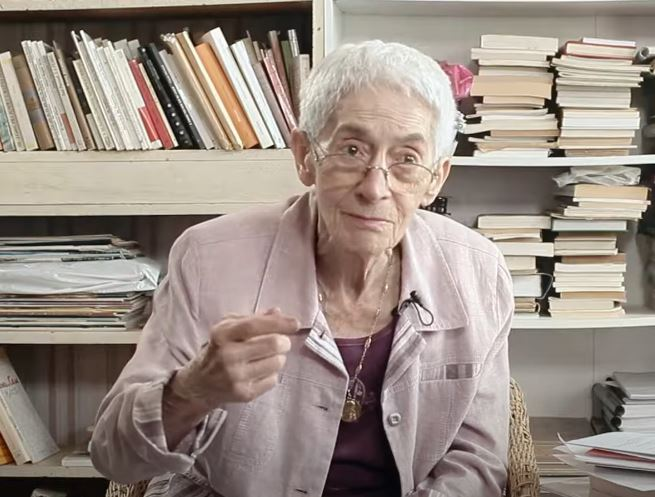
- Portet in 2017
- Born: 28 August 1927; Saint-Paul-de-Fenouillet, Pyrénées-Orientales, France
- Died: 5 September 2021 (aged 94); Elne, France
- Education: University of Montpellier
- Occupations: Writer; linguist
- Writing career
- Pen name: Renada-Laura Portet
- Language: Catalan
- Genres: Poetry; prose; non-fiction
- Subject: linguistics, toponymy, or onomastics
- Notable works: Poemes; Castell negrey; Els noms de lloc del Rosselló; L'escletxa; Rigau & Rigaud; Una dona t'escriu
- Notable awards: Creu de Sant Jordi; Premi Joan Blanca

Renada-Laura Portet was the pen name of Renada-Laura Calmon-Ouillet (28 August 1927 – 5 September 2021) a Northern Catalonia writer and linguist of Occitania origin. She was one of the most important literary voices in Northern Catalonia. Portet cultivated the genres of poetry, short story, novel, drama, and essays, as well as scientific or research writing on topics such as linguistics, toponymy, or onomastics. She used several other pseudonyms including, "Caterina Martí", "Isabel Rosselló", "Vicenta Pallarès", "Toni Vidaló" and "Ramon Oliver".

== Biography ==
Renada-Laura Calmon-Ouillet was born in Saint-Paul-de-Fenouillet, Pyrénées-Orientales, France, 28 August 1927.

She earned a degree in Romance Letters and Languages from the University of Montpellier. Portet's doctoral studies were in Romance philology.

Portet lived in exile in Algeria for four years and in Poitiers for twelve.

Portet worked as a high school and university teacher. This included her work in the Catalan program of the University of Trier (Germany) and West Virginia University (USA), and the French program of the University of Pennsylvania (USA).

Portet was the author of many poetry collections, in addition to a large number of books in prose, and short story collections. She produced at least two books focused on her specialization in toponymy and onomastic. She published stories and poems in local magazines as well as Catalan onomastic research articles. As a poet, short story writer, or novelist, she appeared in seven university anthologies in the United States, Italy, France, Catalonia, and Germany, such as Moderne katalanische Erzahlungen/Contes catalans moderns (Bonn: Romanistischer Verlag, 1988).

== Death and legacy ==
In 1991, the filmmaker-author Robert Guisset made a literary film portrait entitled Renada'Song dedicated to the author.

Renada-Laura Calmon-Ouillet died in Elne, 5 September 2021.

== Awards and honours ==
- 1974, Prize, French Ministry of Culture
- 1976, Natural Flower, at the Floral Games of the Catalan Language in Perpignan, for Poemes
- 1978, Mantenidora en Llengua Catalana
- 1980, Library of Catalonia award
- 1981, Víctor Català award, for the collection of short stories Castell negrey. Later, the award was withdrawn, because Portet published the book in a French publishing house.
- 1981, Vila de Perpinyà-Modest Sabaté, for Els noms de lloc del Rosselló
- 1983, Finalist, Sant Jordi Prize, for the novel L'escletxa
- 1988, Knight, Ordre des Palmes académiques
- 1993, Maître d'Honneur, Ordre International des Anysetiers
- 1988, Officer, Ordre des Palmes académiques
- 1997, Joan Blanca Award
- 1999, Commander, Orde de l’Estrella d’Or, Fundació Europea
- 1999, Prix Majeur des Lettres
- 2000, Silver medal, Orde de la Reine Violent, Vallbona de les Monges
- 2002, Finalist, Josep Pla award, for Rigau & Rigaud. Un pintor a la cort de la rosa gratacul
- 2004, Creu de Sant Jordi
- 2004, Premi Ramon Juncosa Short Story Award for the collection Una dona t'escriu
- 2005, Prix Méditerranée-Roussillon
- 2007, Premi de la rosa, for the whole of her work.
- 2009, Premi Internacional de Literatura Antonio Machado
- 2017, Coll de Manrella Memorial award, at the 39th Coll de Manrella Meeting
- 2017, On the occasion of her 90th birthday, the Department of Culture of the Generalitat of Catalonia, the Institute of Catalan Studies, and the Institution of Catalan Letters paid tribute to his literary career and commitment.

== Selected works ==
=== Poetry collections ===
- 1990, Jocs de convit
- 1992, Una ombra anomenada oblit
- 1994, El cant de la Sibil·la
- 2017, N'hom

=== Short story collections ===
- 2004, Una dona t'escriu

=== Prose ===
- 1981, Castell negre
- 1983, L'escletxa
- 2002, Rigau & Rigaud

=== Non-fiction ===
- 1981, Els noms de lloc del Rosselló
- 1983, Toponímia rossellonesa
