= Langon station =

Railway station in Langon, France

Coordinates: 44°33′19″N 0°15′20″W

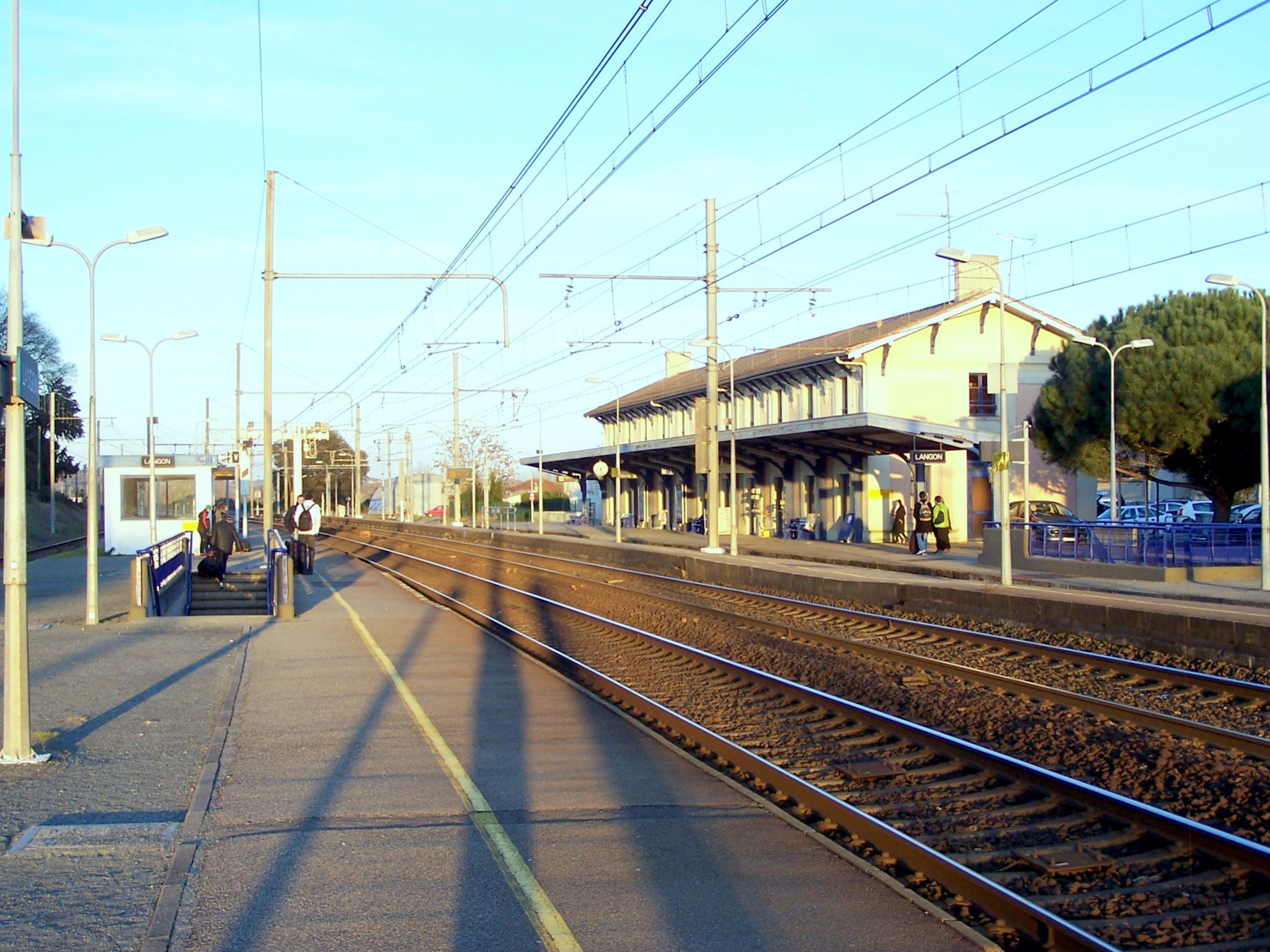
Gare de Langon

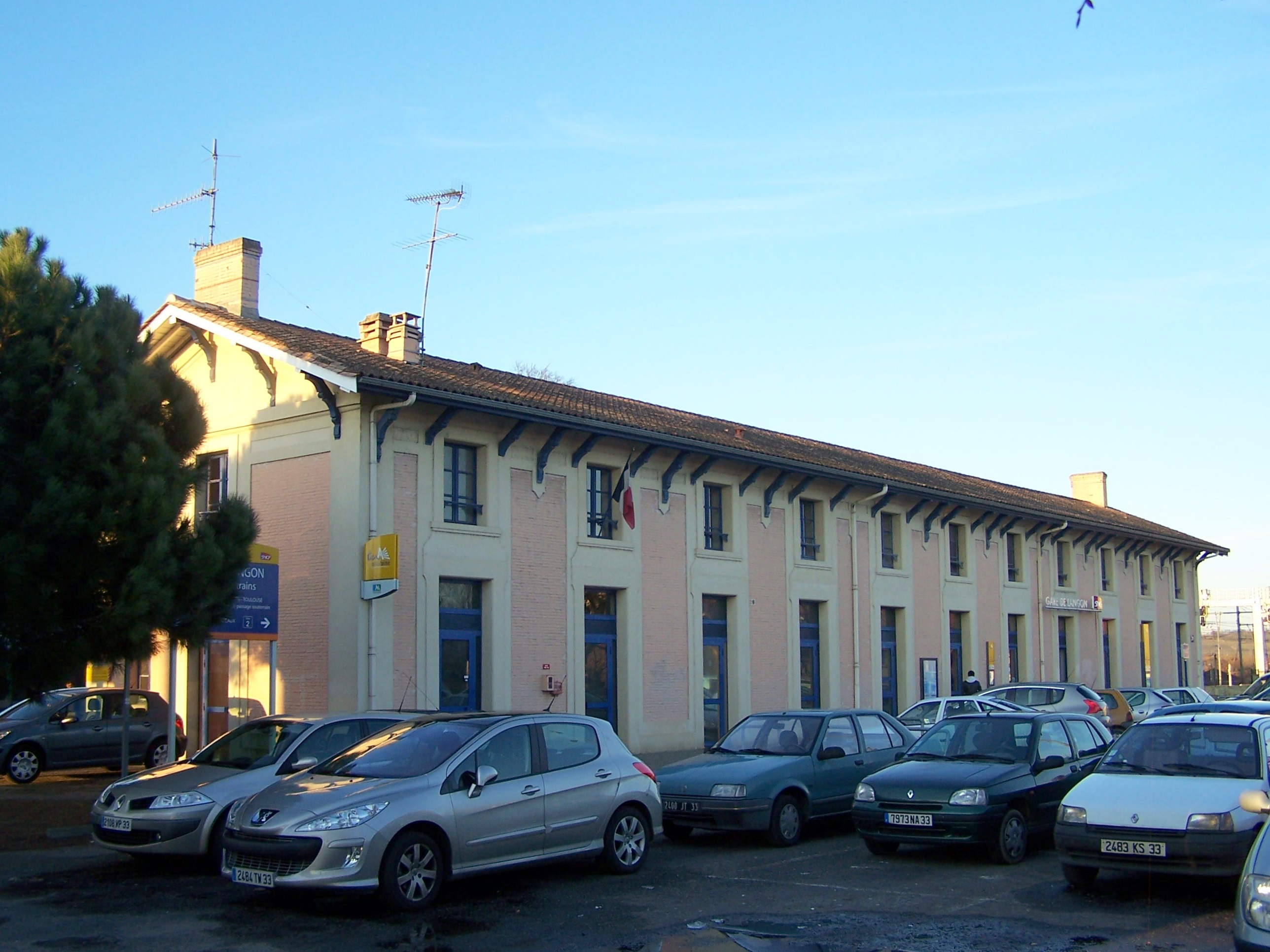
The station building

Langon is a railway station in Langon, Nouvelle-Aquitaine, France. The station opened on 31 May 1854 and is located on the Bordeaux–Sète railway line. The station is served by TER (local) services operated by SNCF. The station was also located on the line from Gabarret, which closed in 1923.

== Train services ==
The following services currently call at Langon:

- local service (TER Nouvelle-Aquitaine) Bordeaux - Langon - Marmande - Agen

Preceding station	TER Nouvelle-Aquitaine	Following station
Preignac towards Bordeaux	43.2U	Terminus
Cérons towards Bordeaux	44	Saint-Macaire towards Agen
