= Barie =

- Commune
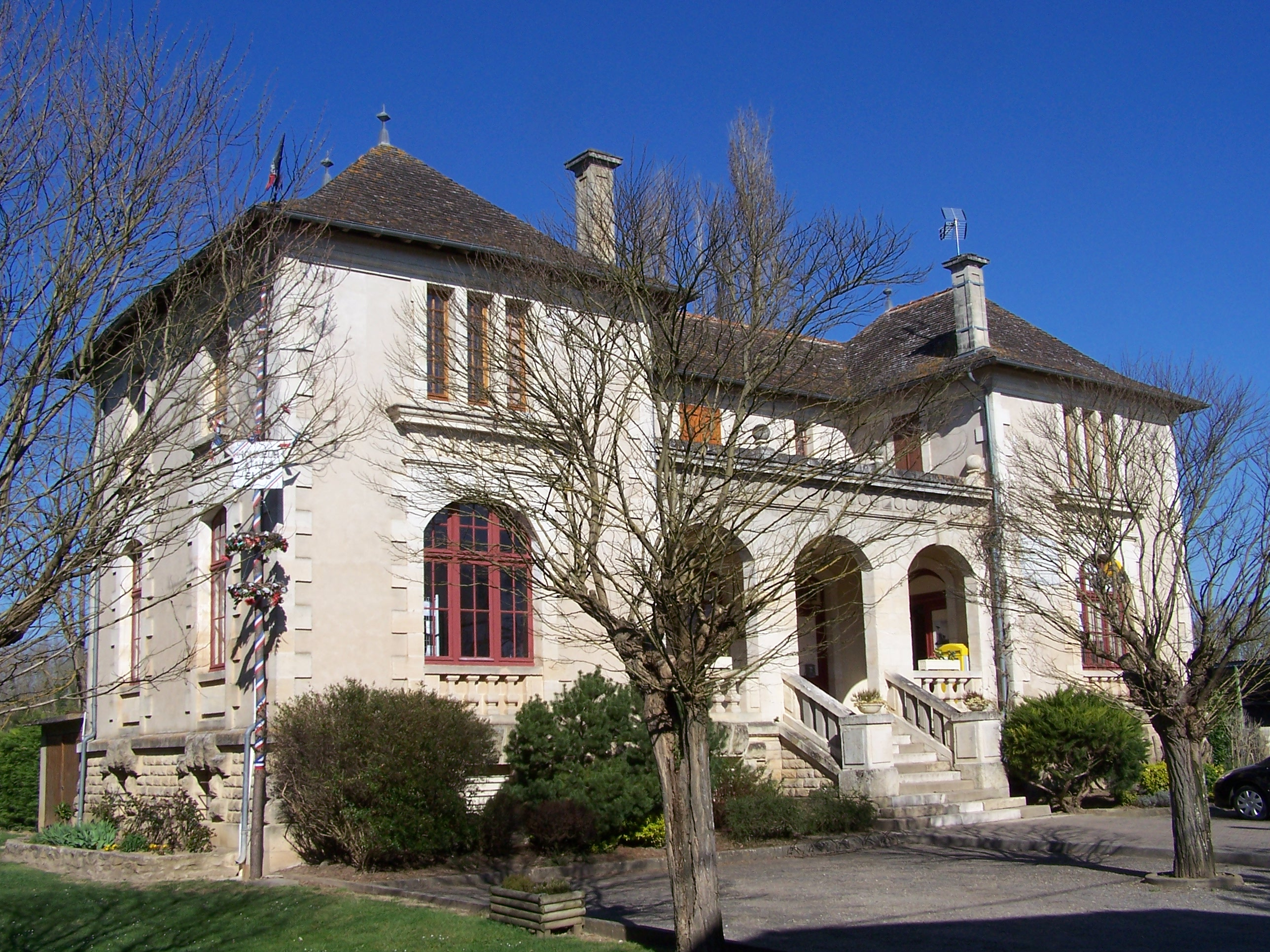
- Town hall
- Location of Barie
- Location within France Location within Nouvelle-Aquitaine
- Coordinates: 44°34′16″N 0°06′49″W
- Country: France
- Region: Nouvelle-Aquitaine
- Department: Gironde
- Arrondissement: Langon
- Canton: Le Réolais et Les Bastides

Government
  - Mayor (2020–2026): Bernard Pagot
- Area^{1}: 5.33 km^{2} (2.06 sq mi)
- Elevation: 13 m (43 ft)
- Highest elevation: 18 m (59 ft)
- Lowest elevation: 7 m (23 ft)
- Population (2023): 274
  - Density: 51.4/km^{2} (133/sq mi)
- Time zone: UTC+01:00 (CET)
  - Summer (DST): UTC+02:00 (CEST)
- INSEE/Postal code: 33027 /33190
- ^{1} French Land Register data, which excludes lakes, ponds, glaciers > 1 km^{2} (0.386 sq mi or 247 acres) and river estuaries.

Barie (French pronunciation: [baʁi]; Occitan: Varia) is a commune in the Gironde department in southwestern France.

== Population ==
Historical population
Year	Pop.	±% p.a.
1968	289	—
1975	277	−0.60%
1982	260	−0.90%
1990	234	−1.31%
1999	211	−1.14%
2007	287	+3.92%
2012	283	−0.28%
2017	296	+0.90%
2023	274	−1.28%
Source: INSEE

== See also ==
- Communes of the Gironde department
