= Ruch, Gironde =

Ruch
- Commune
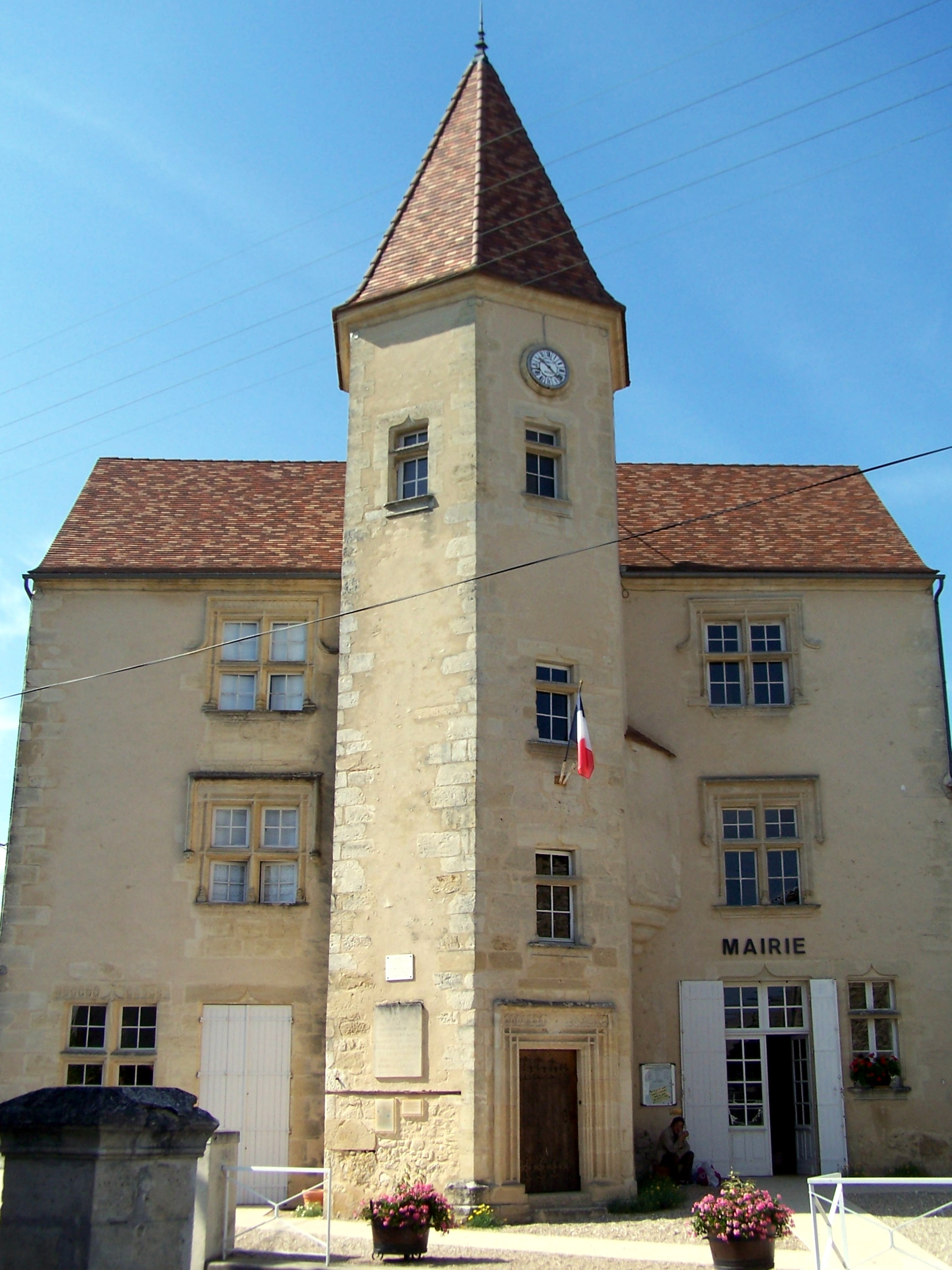
- Town hall
- Location of Ruch
- Location within France Location within Nouvelle-Aquitaine
- Coordinates: 44°46′38″N 0°02′20″W
- Country: France
- Region: Nouvelle-Aquitaine
- Department: Gironde
- Arrondissement: Langon
- Canton: Le Réolais et Les Bastides

Government
  - Mayor (2020–2026): Raymond Viandon
- Area^{1}: 14.49 km^{2} (5.59 sq mi)
- Elevation: 76 m (249 ft)
- Highest elevation: 110 m (360 ft)
- Lowest elevation: 17 m (56 ft)
- Population (2023): 539
  - Density: 37.2/km^{2} (96.3/sq mi)
- Time zone: UTC+01:00 (CET)
  - Summer (DST): UTC+02:00 (CEST)
- INSEE/Postal code: 33361 /33350
- ^{1} French Land Register data, which excludes lakes, ponds, glaciers > 1 km^{2} (0.386 sq mi or 247 acres) and river estuaries.

Ruch is a commune in the Gironde department in Nouvelle-Aquitaine in southwestern France.

== Population ==
Historical population
Year	Pop.	±% p.a.
1968	588	—
1975	507	−2.10%
1982	523	+0.44%
1990	509	−0.34%
1999	504	−0.11%
2007	519	+0.37%
2012	598	+2.87%
2017	600	+0.07%
2023	539	−1.77%
Source: INSEE

== See also ==
- Communes of the Gironde department
