= Fontet =

- Commune
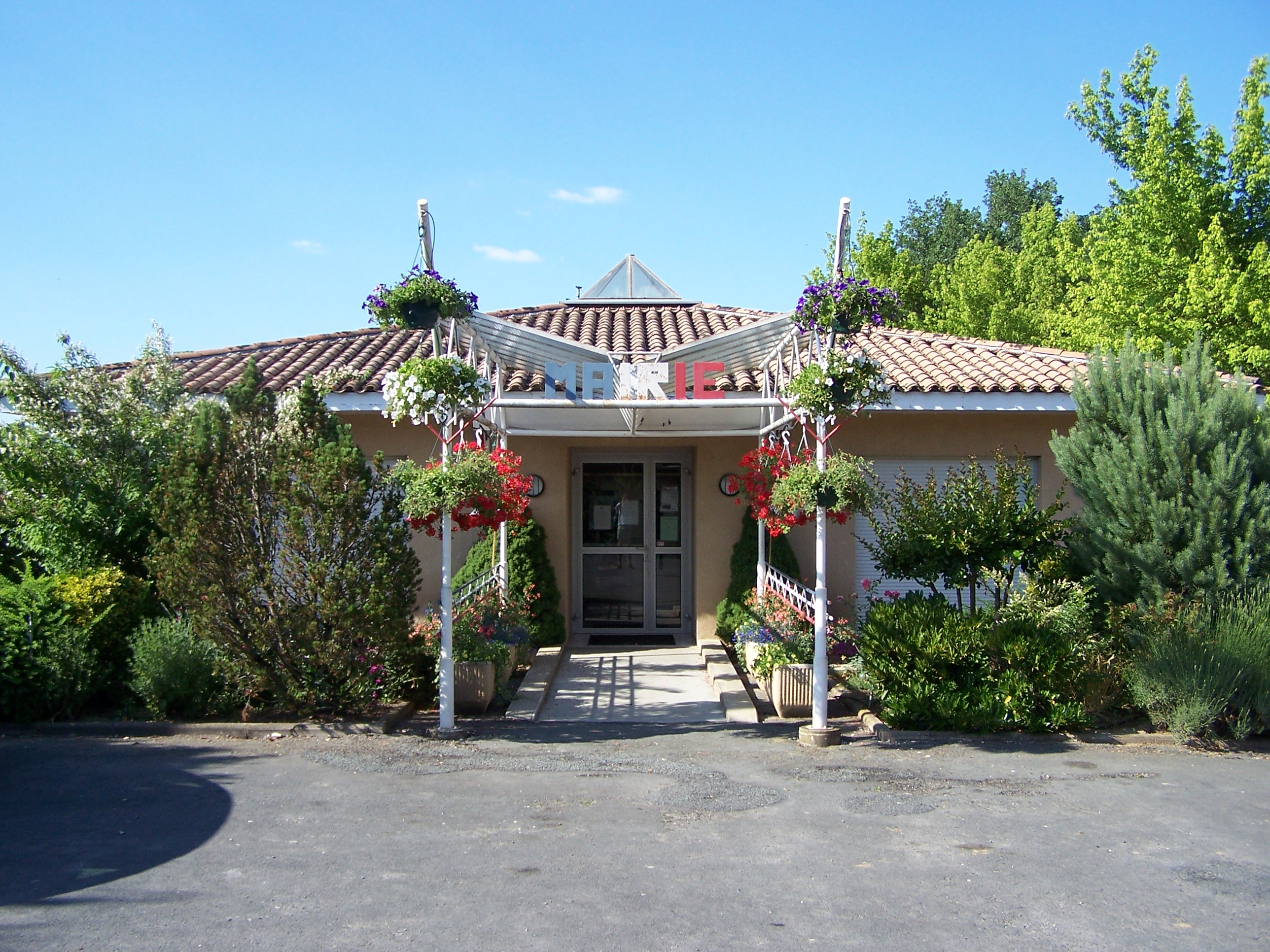
- Town hall
- Location of Fontet
- Location within France Location within Nouvelle-Aquitaine
- Coordinates: 44°33′35″N 0°01′47″W
- Country: France
- Region: Nouvelle-Aquitaine
- Department: Gironde
- Arrondissement: Langon
- Canton: Le Réolais et Les Bastides
- Intercommunality: Réolais en Sud Gironde

Government
  - Mayor (2020–2026): Serge Poujardieu
- Area^{1}: 7.67 km^{2} (2.96 sq mi)
- Elevation: 50 m (160 ft)
- Highest elevation: 63 m (207 ft)
- Lowest elevation: 5 m (16 ft)
- Population (2023): 746
  - Density: 97.3/km^{2} (252/sq mi)
- Time zone: UTC+01:00 (CET)
  - Summer (DST): UTC+02:00 (CEST)
- INSEE/Postal code: 33170 /33190
- ^{1} French Land Register data, which excludes lakes, ponds, glaciers > 1 km^{2} (0.386 sq mi or 247 acres) and river estuaries.

Fontet (French pronunciation: [fɔ̃tɛ]; Occitan: Hontet) is a commune in the Gironde department in Nouvelle-Aquitaine in southwestern France.

It is situated between Bordeaux and Bergerac.

== Population ==
Historical population
Year	Pop.	±% p.a.
1968	626	—
1975	636	+0.23%
1982	672	+0.79%
1990	715	+0.78%
1999	732	+0.26%
2007	733	+0.02%
2012	837	+2.69%
2017	793	−1.07%
2023	746	−1.01%
Source: INSEE

== See also ==
- Communes of the Gironde department
