= Canton of Le Réolais et Les Bastides =

Coordinates: 44.83°N 0.22°E

Le Réolais et Les Bastides
- Canton
- A map of the canton of Le Réolais et Les Bastides in the Gironde department.
- Country: France
- Region: Nouvelle-Aquitaine
- Department: Gironde
- No. of communes: {{{nbcomm}}}
- Established: 22 March 2015
- Area: 837.31 km^{2} (323.29 sq mi)
- INSEE code: 33 27

The canton of Le Réolais et Les Bastides is an administrative division of the Gironde department, southwestern France. It was created at the French canton reorganisation which came into effect in March 2015. Its seat is in Pineuilh.

It consists of the following communes:

1. Aillas
2. Auriolles
3. Auros
4. Bagas
5. Barie
6. Bassanne
7. Berthez
8. Blaignac
9. Blasimon
10. Bourdelles
11. Brannens
12. Brouqueyran
13. Camiran
14. Caplong
15. Casseuil
16. Castelmoron-d'Albret
17. Castelviel
18. Caumont
19. Cazaugitat
20. Cleyrac
21. Coimères
22. Cours-de-Monségur
23. Coutures
24. Daubèze
25. Dieulivol
26. Les Esseintes
27. Eynesse
28. Floudès
29. Fontet
30. Fossès-et-Baleyssac
31. Gironde-sur-Dropt
32. Hure
33. Lados
34. Lamothe-Landerron
35. Landerrouat
36. Landerrouet-sur-Ségur
37. Les Lèves-et-Thoumeyragues
38. Ligueux
39. Listrac-de-Durèze
40. Loubens
41. Loupiac-de-la-Réole
42. Margueron
43. Massugas
44. Mauriac
45. Mérignas
46. Mesterrieux
47. Mongauzy
48. Monségur
49. Montagoudin
50. Morizès
51. Neuffons
52. Noaillac
53. Pellegrue
54. Pineuilh
55. Pondaurat
56. Le Puy
57. Puybarban
58. La Réole
59. Rimons
60. Riocaud
61. Roquebrune
62. La Roquille
63. Ruch
64. Saint-André-et-Appelles
65. Saint-Antoine-du-Queyret
66. Saint-Avit-de-Soulège
67. Saint-Avit-Saint-Nazaire
68. Saint-Brice
69. Sainte-Foy-la-Grande
70. Sainte-Gemme
71. Saint-Exupéry
72. Saint-Félix-de-Foncaude
73. Saint-Ferme
74. Saint-Hilaire-de-la-Noaille
75. Saint-Hilaire-du-Bois
76. Saint-Martin-de-Lerm
77. Saint-Martin-du-Puy
78. Saint-Michel-de-Lapujade
79. Saint-Philippe-du-Seignal
80. Saint-Quentin-de-Caplong
81. Saint-Sève
82. Saint-Sulpice-de-Guilleragues
83. Saint-Sulpice-de-Pommiers
84. Saint-Vivien-de-Monségur
85. Sauveterre-de-Guyenne
86. Savignac
87. Sigalens
88. Soussac
89. Taillecavat
