= Montagoudin =

- Commune
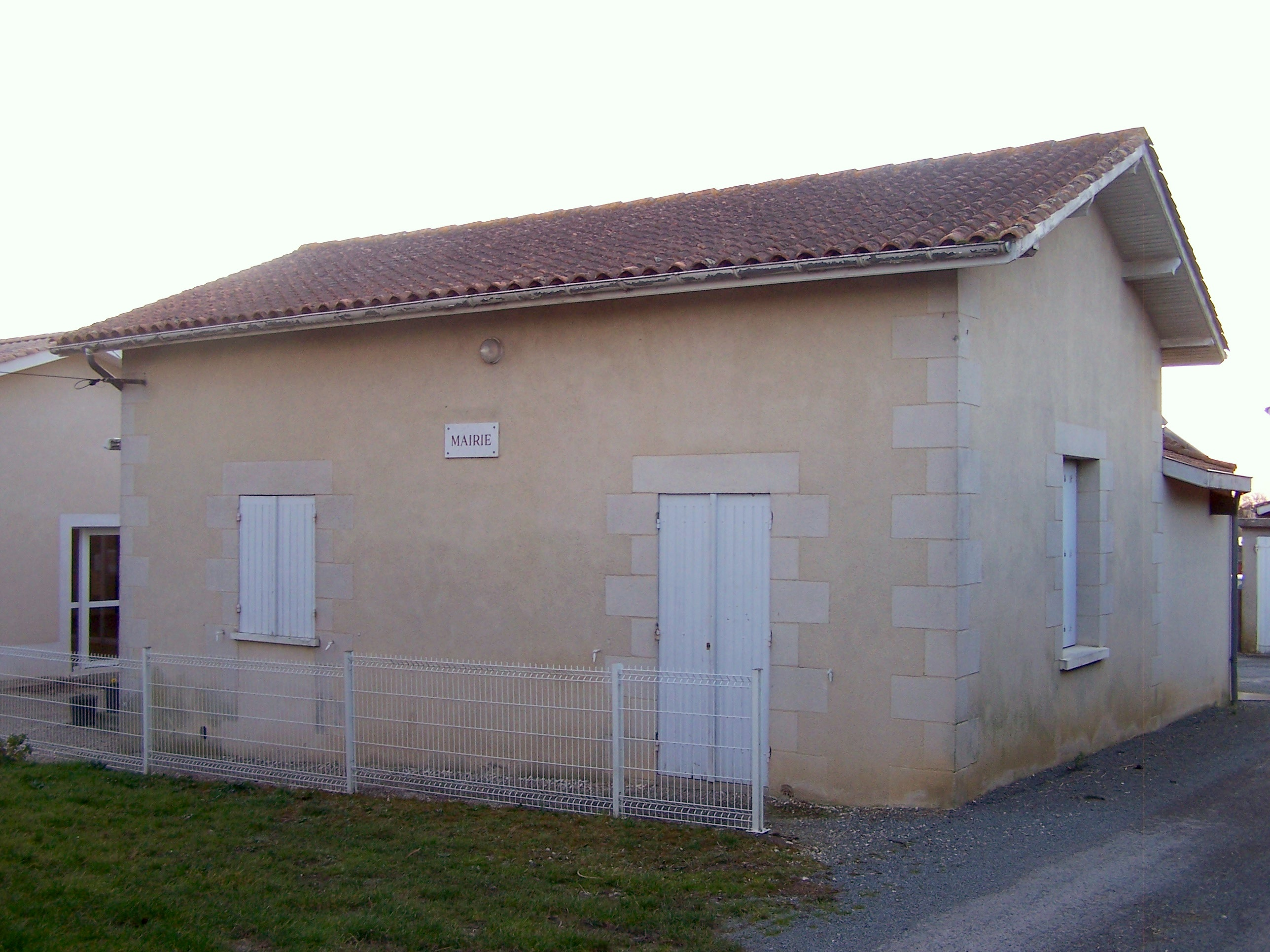
- Town hall
- Location of Montagoudin
- Location within France Location within Nouvelle-Aquitaine
- Coordinates: 44°34′42″N 0°00′05″E
- Country: France
- Region: Nouvelle-Aquitaine
- Department: Gironde
- Arrondissement: Langon
- Canton: Le Réolais et Les Bastides
- Intercommunality: Réolais en Sud Gironde

Government
  - Mayor (2020–2026): Joël Doux
- Area^{1}: 3.34 km^{2} (1.29 sq mi)
- Elevation: 150 m (490 ft)
- Highest elevation: 111 m (364 ft)
- Lowest elevation: 14 m (46 ft)
- Population (2023): 165
  - Density: 49.4/km^{2} (128/sq mi)
- Time zone: UTC+01:00 (CET)
  - Summer (DST): UTC+02:00 (CEST)
- INSEE/Postal code: 33291 /33190
- ^{1} French Land Register data, which excludes lakes, ponds, glaciers > 1 km^{2} (0.386 sq mi or 247 acres) and river estuaries.

Montagoudin (French pronunciation: [mɔ̃taɡudɛ̃]; Occitan: Montagaudin) is a commune in the Gironde department in Nouvelle-Aquitaine in southwestern France.

== Population ==
Historical population
Year	Pop.	±% p.a.
1968	151	—
1975	141	−0.97%
1982	151	+0.98%
1990	160	+0.73%
1999	145	−1.09%
2007	162	+1.40%
2012	176	+1.67%
2017	181	+0.56%
2023	165	−1.53%
Source: INSEE

== See also ==
- Communes of the Gironde department
