= Saint-Exupéry, Gironde =

Saint-Exupéry
- Commune
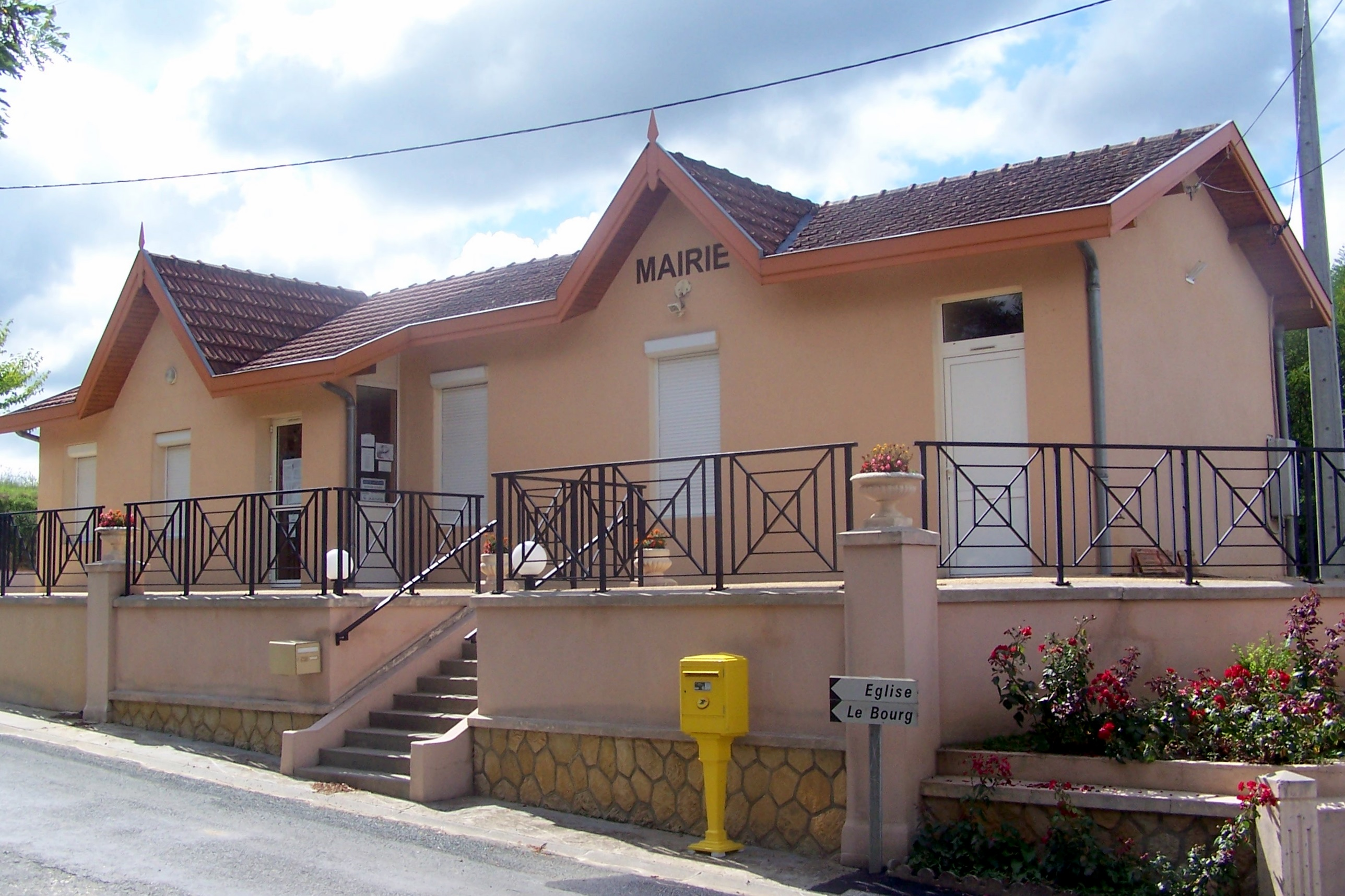
- Town hall

- Coat of arms
- Location of Saint-Exupéry
- Location within France Location within Nouvelle-Aquitaine
- Coordinates: 44°37′37″N 0°06′05″W
- Country: France
- Region: Nouvelle-Aquitaine
- Department: Gironde
- Arrondissement: Langon
- Canton: Le Réolais et Les Bastides

Government
  - Mayor (2020–2026): Thierry Gourgues
- Area^{1}: 4.19 km^{2} (1.62 sq mi)
- Elevation: 63 m (207 ft)
- Highest elevation: 83 m (272 ft)
- Lowest elevation: 17 m (56 ft)
- Population (2023): 168
  - Density: 40.1/km^{2} (104/sq mi)
- Time zone: UTC+01:00 (CET)
  - Summer (DST): UTC+02:00 (CEST)
- INSEE/Postal code: 33398 /33190
- ^{1} French Land Register data, which excludes lakes, ponds, glaciers > 1 km^{2} (0.386 sq mi or 247 acres) and river estuaries.

Saint-Exupéry is a commune in the Gironde department in Nouvelle-Aquitaine in southwestern France.

== Population ==
Historical population
Year	Pop.	±% p.a.
1968	144	—
1975	124	−2.11%
1982	120	−0.47%
1990	109	−1.19%
1999	119	+0.98%
2007	157	+3.52%
2012	158	+0.13%
2017	168	+1.23%
2023	168	+0.00%
Source: INSEE

== See also ==
- Communes of the Gironde department
