= Castelviel =

- Commune
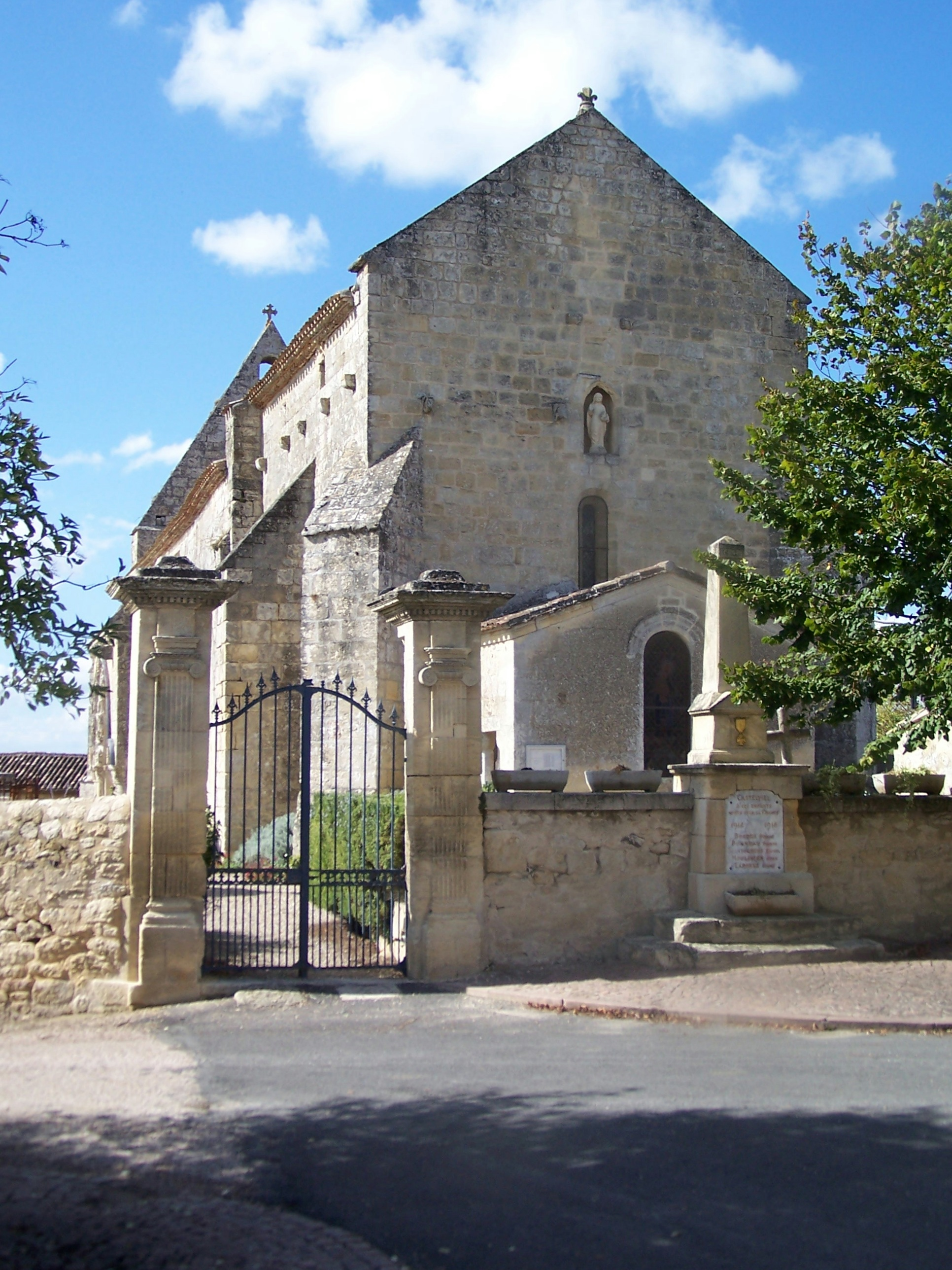
- The church in Castelviel
- Location of Castelviel
- Location within France Location within Nouvelle-Aquitaine
- Coordinates: 44°40′06″N 0°09′07″W
- Country: France
- Region: Nouvelle-Aquitaine
- Department: Gironde
- Arrondissement: Langon
- Canton: Le Réolais et Les Bastides

Government
  - Mayor (2020–2026): Christiane Fouilhac
- Area^{1}: 8.02 km^{2} (3.10 sq mi)
- Elevation: 110 m (360 ft)
- Highest elevation: 121 m (397 ft)
- Lowest elevation: 53 m (174 ft)
- Population (2023): 205
  - Density: 25.6/km^{2} (66.2/sq mi)
- Time zone: UTC+01:00 (CET)
  - Summer (DST): UTC+02:00 (CEST)
- INSEE/Postal code: 33105 /33540
- ^{1} French Land Register data, which excludes lakes, ponds, glaciers > 1 km^{2} (0.386 sq mi or 247 acres) and river estuaries.

Castelviel (French pronunciation: [kastɛlvjɛl]; Occitan: Castèthvièlh) is a commune in the Gironde department in Nouvelle-Aquitaine in southwestern France.

== Population ==
Historical population
Year	Pop.	±% p.a.
1968	224	—
1975	206	−1.19%
1982	197	−0.64%
1990	198	+0.06%
1999	185	−0.75%
2007	180	−0.34%
2012	191	+1.19%
2017	219	+2.77%
2023	205	−1.09%
Source: INSEE

== See also ==
- Communes of the Gironde department
