= Taillecavat =

Commune in Nouvelle-Aquitaine, France

- Commune
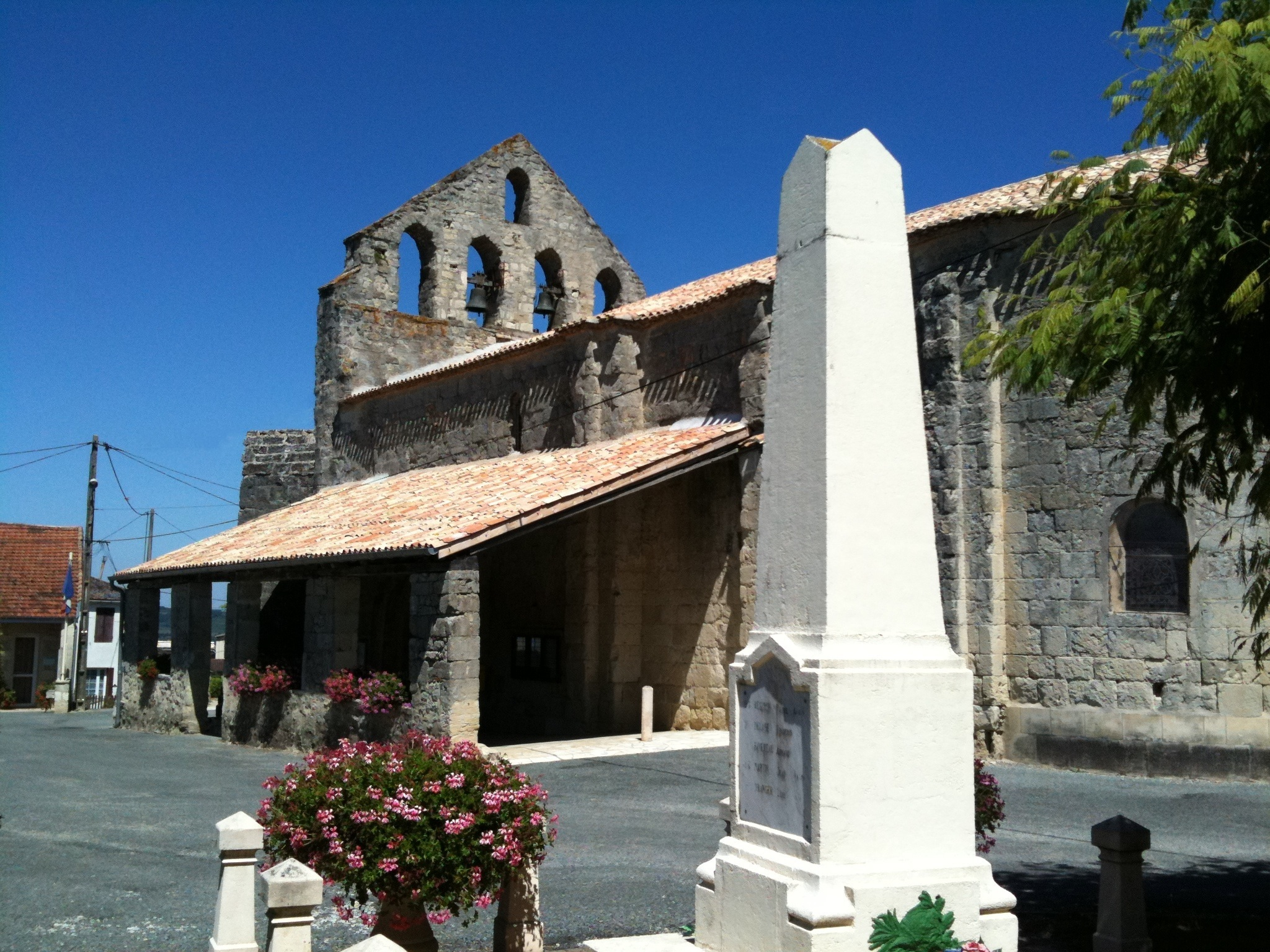
- Church Notre-Dame of Taillecavat
- Location of Taillecavat
- Location within France Location within Nouvelle-Aquitaine
- Coordinates: 44°38′50″N 0°09′03″E
- Country: France
- Region: Nouvelle-Aquitaine
- Department: Gironde
- Arrondissement: Langon
- Canton: Le Réolais et Les Bastides

Government
  - Mayor (2020–2026): Danièle Fostier
- Area^{1}: 9.49 km^{2} (3.66 sq mi)
- Elevation: 138 m (453 ft)
- Highest elevation: 101 m (331 ft)
- Lowest elevation: 28 m (92 ft)
- Population (2023): 306
  - Density: 32.2/km^{2} (83.5/sq mi)
- Time zone: UTC+01:00 (CET)
  - Summer (DST): UTC+02:00 (CEST)
- INSEE/Postal code: 33520 /33580
- ^{1} French Land Register data, which excludes lakes, ponds, glaciers > 1 km^{2} (0.386 sq mi or 247 acres) and river estuaries.

Taillecavat (French pronunciation: [tajkava]) is a commune located in the Gironde department and Nouvelle-Aquitaine region in southwestern France.

The name of the commune in occitan is Talhacavat.

== Geography ==
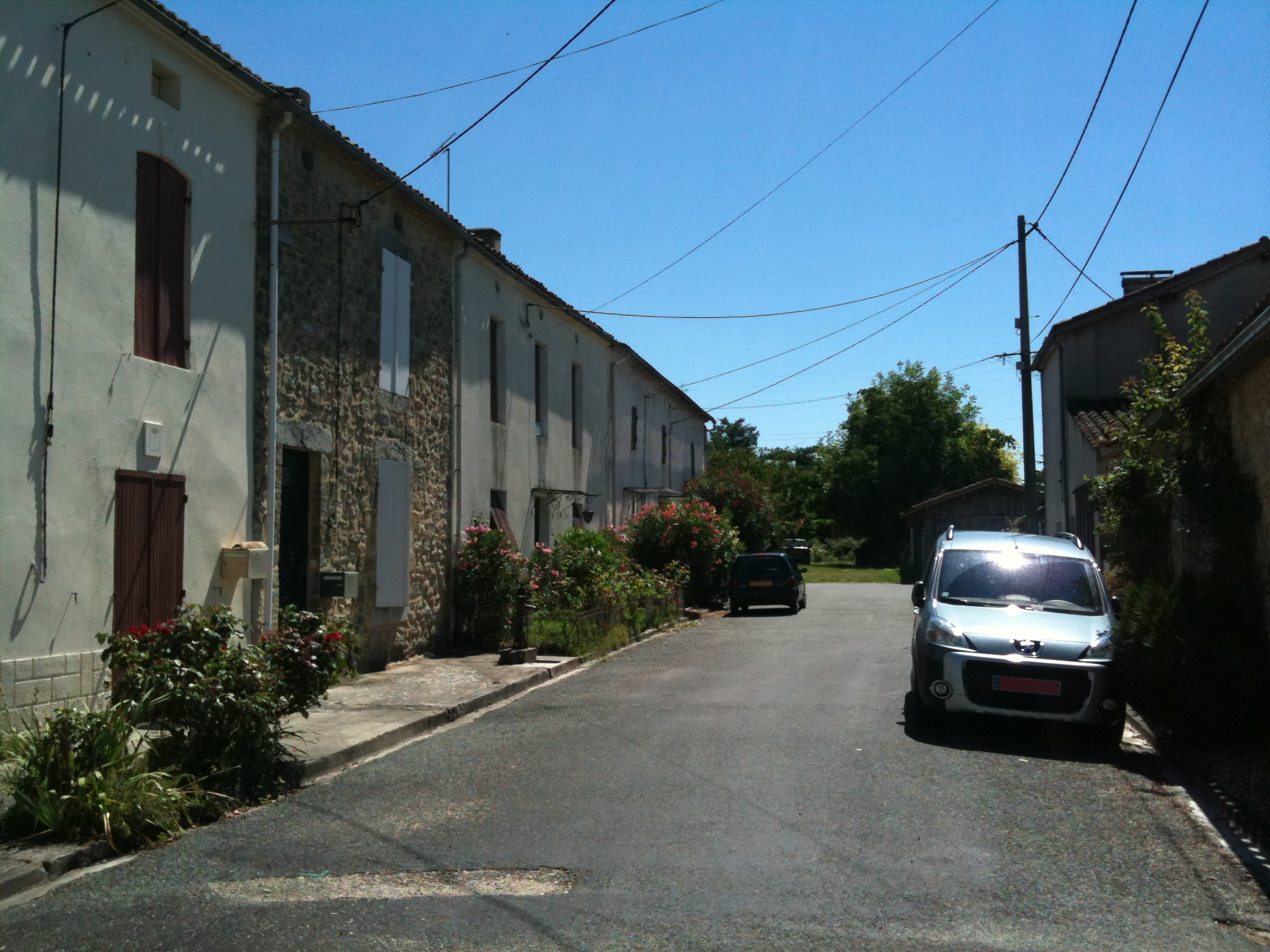
Taillecavat center

Taillecavat is located at one hour by car of Bordeaux and Agen. Fifteen minutes are needed to go to the city of Marmande (more than 30,000 people urban area).

Taillecavat is neighboring of Lot-et-Garonne department, so it presents the advantage of an opening on both departments and the entertainment they offer.

== Population ==
Historical population
Year	Pop.	±% p.a.
1968	337	—
1975	290	−2.12%
1982	241	−2.61%
1990	250	+0.46%
1999	263	+0.56%
2007	294	+1.40%
2012	311	+1.13%
2017	300	−0.72%
2023	306	+0.33%
Source: INSEE

== See also ==
- Communes of the Gironde department
