= Mérignas =

- Commune
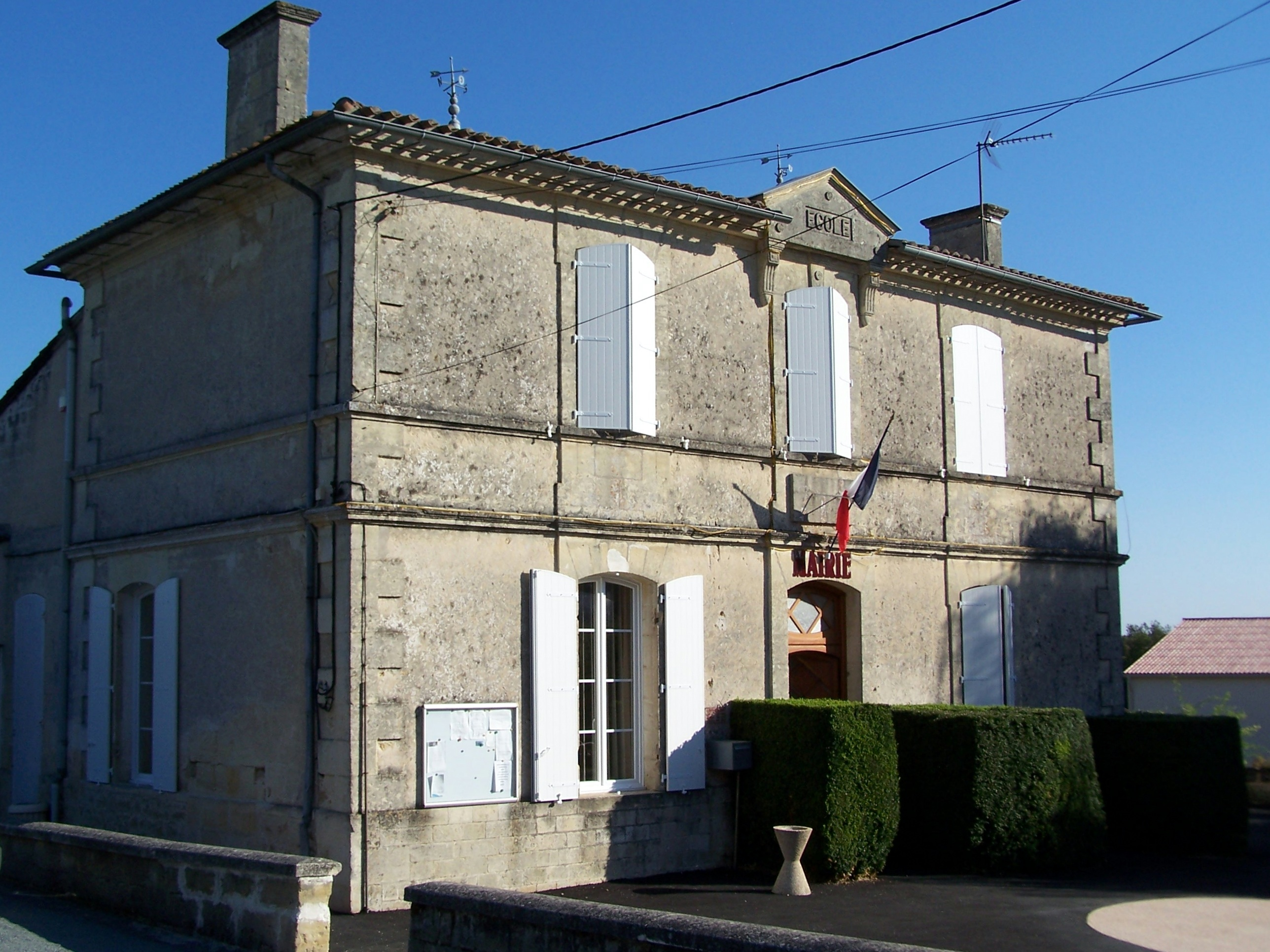
- Town hall
- Location of Mérignas
- Location within France Location within Nouvelle-Aquitaine
- Coordinates: 44°47′07″N 0°05′11″W
- Country: France
- Region: Nouvelle-Aquitaine
- Department: Gironde
- Arrondissement: Langon
- Canton: Le Réolais et Les Bastides

Government
  - Mayor (2020–2026): Gilles Cira
- Area^{1}: 9.56 km^{2} (3.69 sq mi)
- Elevation: 80 m (260 ft)
- Highest elevation: 96 m (315 ft)
- Lowest elevation: 9 m (30 ft)
- Population (2023): 295
  - Density: 30.9/km^{2} (79.9/sq mi)
- Time zone: UTC+01:00 (CET)
  - Summer (DST): UTC+02:00 (CEST)
- INSEE/Postal code: 33282 /33350
- ^{1} French Land Register data, which excludes lakes, ponds, glaciers > 1 km^{2} (0.386 sq mi or 247 acres) and river estuaries.

Mérignas is a commune in the Gironde department in Nouvelle-Aquitaine in southwestern France.

== Population ==
Historical population
Year	Pop.	±% p.a.
1968	297	—
1975	256	−2.10%
1982	275	+1.03%
1990	295	+0.88%
1999	277	−0.70%
2007	275	−0.09%
2012	305	+2.09%
2017	341	+2.26%
2023	295	−2.39%
Source: INSEE

== See also ==
- Communes of the Gironde department
