= Saint-Sulpice-de-Pommiers =

- Commune
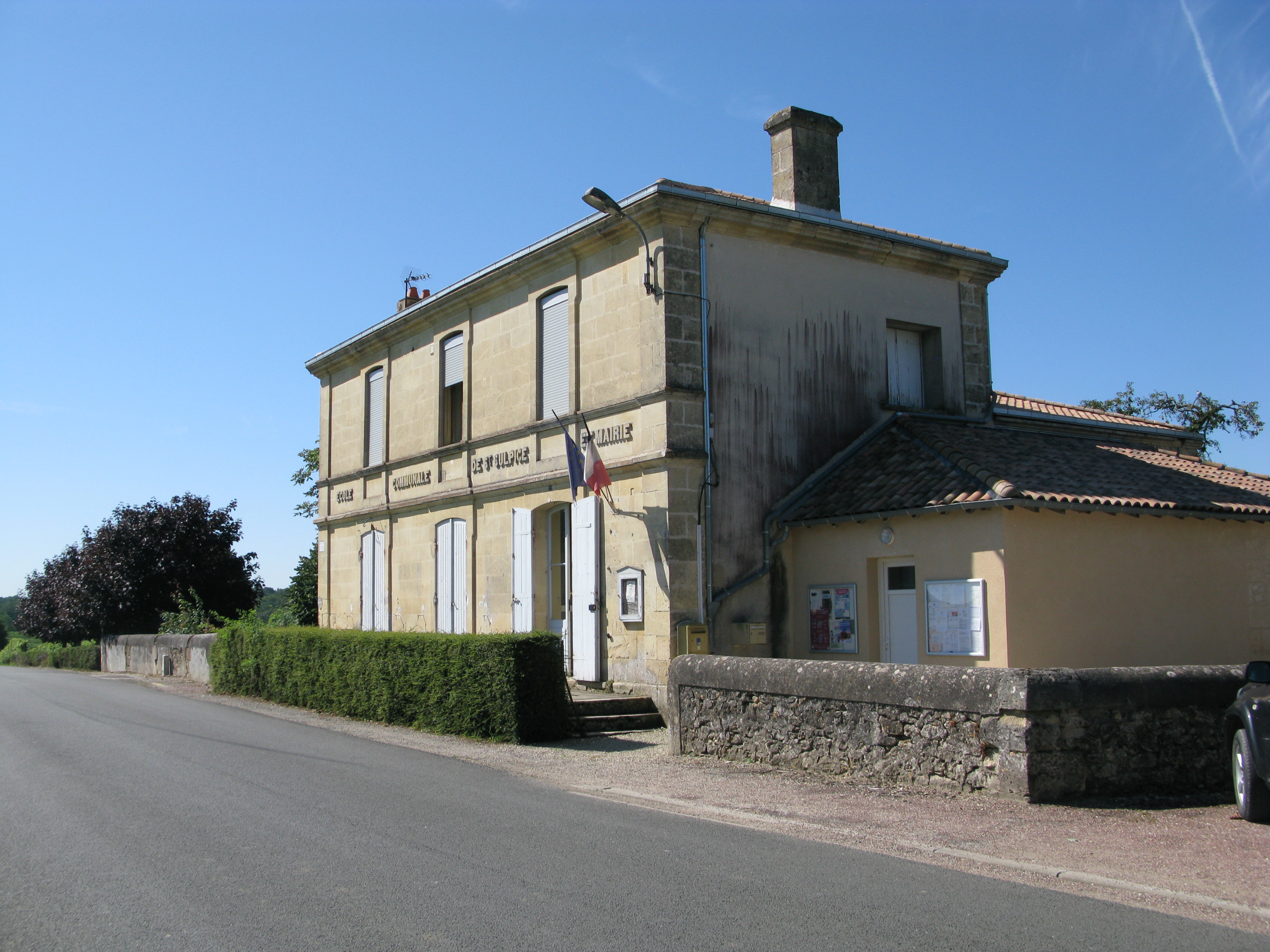
- The town hall in Saint-Sulpice-de-Pommiers
- Location of Saint-Sulpice-de-Pommiers
- Location within France Location within Nouvelle-Aquitaine
- Coordinates: 44°40′20″N 0°06′46″W
- Country: France
- Region: Nouvelle-Aquitaine
- Department: Gironde
- Arrondissement: Langon
- Canton: Le Réolais et Les Bastides

Government
  - Mayor (2020–2026): Sylvie Tessier
- Area^{1}: 9.82 km^{2} (3.79 sq mi)
- Elevation: 84 m (276 ft)
- Highest elevation: 101 m (331 ft)
- Lowest elevation: 33 m (108 ft)
- Population (2023): 277
  - Density: 28.2/km^{2} (73.1/sq mi)
- Time zone: UTC+01:00 (CET)
  - Summer (DST): UTC+02:00 (CEST)
- INSEE/Postal code: 33482 /33540
- ^{1} French Land Register data, which excludes lakes, ponds, glaciers > 1 km^{2} (0.386 sq mi or 247 acres) and river estuaries.

Saint-Sulpice-de-Pommiers (French pronunciation: [sɛ̃ sylpis də pɔmje]; Gascon: Sent Sulpici de Pomèirs) is a commune in the Gironde department in Nouvelle-Aquitaine in southwestern France.

== Population ==
Historical population
Year	Pop.	±% p.a.
1968	269	—
1975	206	−3.74%
1982	202	−0.28%
1990	220	+1.07%
1999	228	+0.40%
2007	224	−0.22%
2012	239	+1.30%
2017	225	−1.20%
2023	277	+3.53%
Source: INSEE

== See also ==
- Communes of the Gironde department
