= Mesterrieux =

- Commune
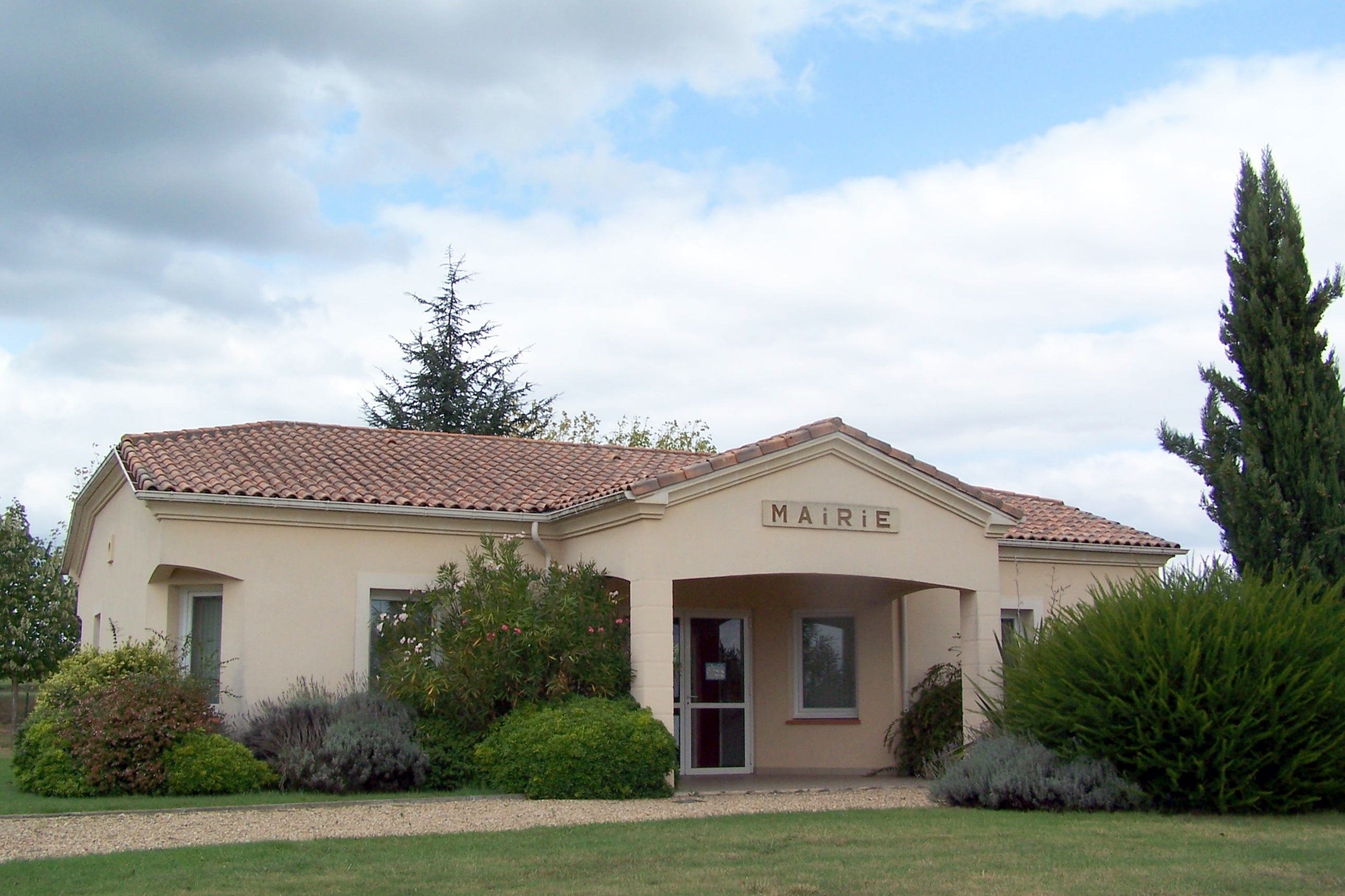
- Town hall
- Location of Mesterrieux
- Location within France Location within Nouvelle-Aquitaine
- Coordinates: 44°38′49″N 0°00′51″W
- Country: France
- Region: Nouvelle-Aquitaine
- Department: Gironde
- Arrondissement: Langon
- Canton: Le Réolais et Les Bastides
- Intercommunality: CC rurales de l'Entre-Deux-Mers

Government
  - Mayor (2020–2026): Alain Didier
- Area^{1}: 3.59 km^{2} (1.39 sq mi)
- Elevation: 30 m (98 ft)
- Highest elevation: 86 m (282 ft)
- Lowest elevation: 12 m (39 ft)
- Population (2023): 221
  - Density: 61.6/km^{2} (159/sq mi)
- Time zone: UTC+01:00 (CET)
  - Summer (DST): UTC+02:00 (CEST)
- INSEE/Postal code: 33283 /33540
- ^{1} French Land Register data, which excludes lakes, ponds, glaciers > 1 km^{2} (0.386 sq mi or 247 acres) and river estuaries.

Mesterrieux (French pronunciation: [mɛstɛʁjø]; Occitan: Mèste Riu) is a commune in the Gironde department in Nouvelle-Aquitaine in southwestern France.

== Population ==
Historical population
Year	Pop.	±% p.a.
1968	174	—
1975	180	+0.49%
1982	180	+0.00%
1990	172	−0.57%
1999	179	+0.44%
2007	202	+1.52%
2012	195	−0.70%
2017	222	+2.63%
2023	221	−0.08%
Source: INSEE

== See also ==
- Communes of the Gironde department
