= Saint-Martin-de-Lerm =

- Commune
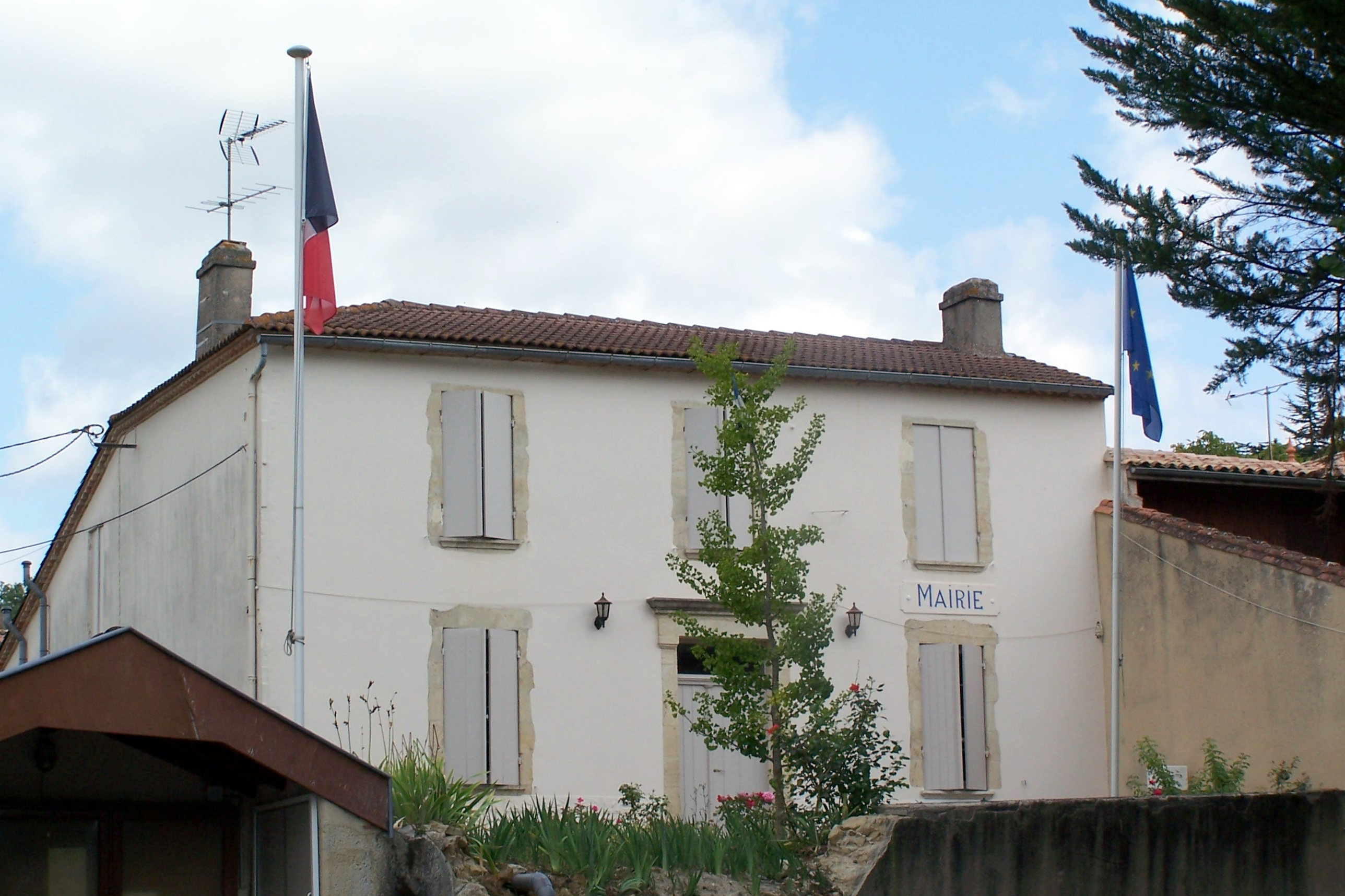
- Town hall
- Location of Saint-Martin-de-Lerm
- Location within France Location within Nouvelle-Aquitaine
- Coordinates: 44°38′55″N 0°02′25″W
- Country: France
- Region: Nouvelle-Aquitaine
- Department: Gironde
- Arrondissement: Langon
- Canton: Le Réolais et Les Bastides

Government
  - Mayor (2020–2026): Jean-Paul Poujon
- Area^{1}: 7.02 km^{2} (2.71 sq mi)
- Elevation: 105 m (344 ft)
- Highest elevation: 96 m (315 ft)
- Lowest elevation: 13 m (43 ft)
- Population (2023): 149
  - Density: 21.2/km^{2} (55.0/sq mi)
- Time zone: UTC+01:00 (CET)
  - Summer (DST): UTC+02:00 (CEST)
- INSEE/Postal code: 33443 /33540
- ^{1} French Land Register data, which excludes lakes, ponds, glaciers > 1 km^{2} (0.386 sq mi or 247 acres) and river estuaries.

Saint-Martin-de-Lerm (French pronunciation: [sɛ̃ maʁtɛ̃ də lɛʁm]; Gascon: Sent Martin de l'Èrm) is a commune in the Gironde department in Nouvelle-Aquitaine in southwestern France.

== Population ==
Historical population
Year	Pop.	±% p.a.
1968	155	—
1975	131	−2.37%
1982	122	−1.01%
1990	104	−1.98%
1999	122	+1.79%
2007	137	+1.46%
2012	143	+0.86%
2017	143	+0.00%
2023	149	+0.69%
Source: INSEE

== See also ==
- Communes of the Gironde department
