= Les Esseintes =

- Commune
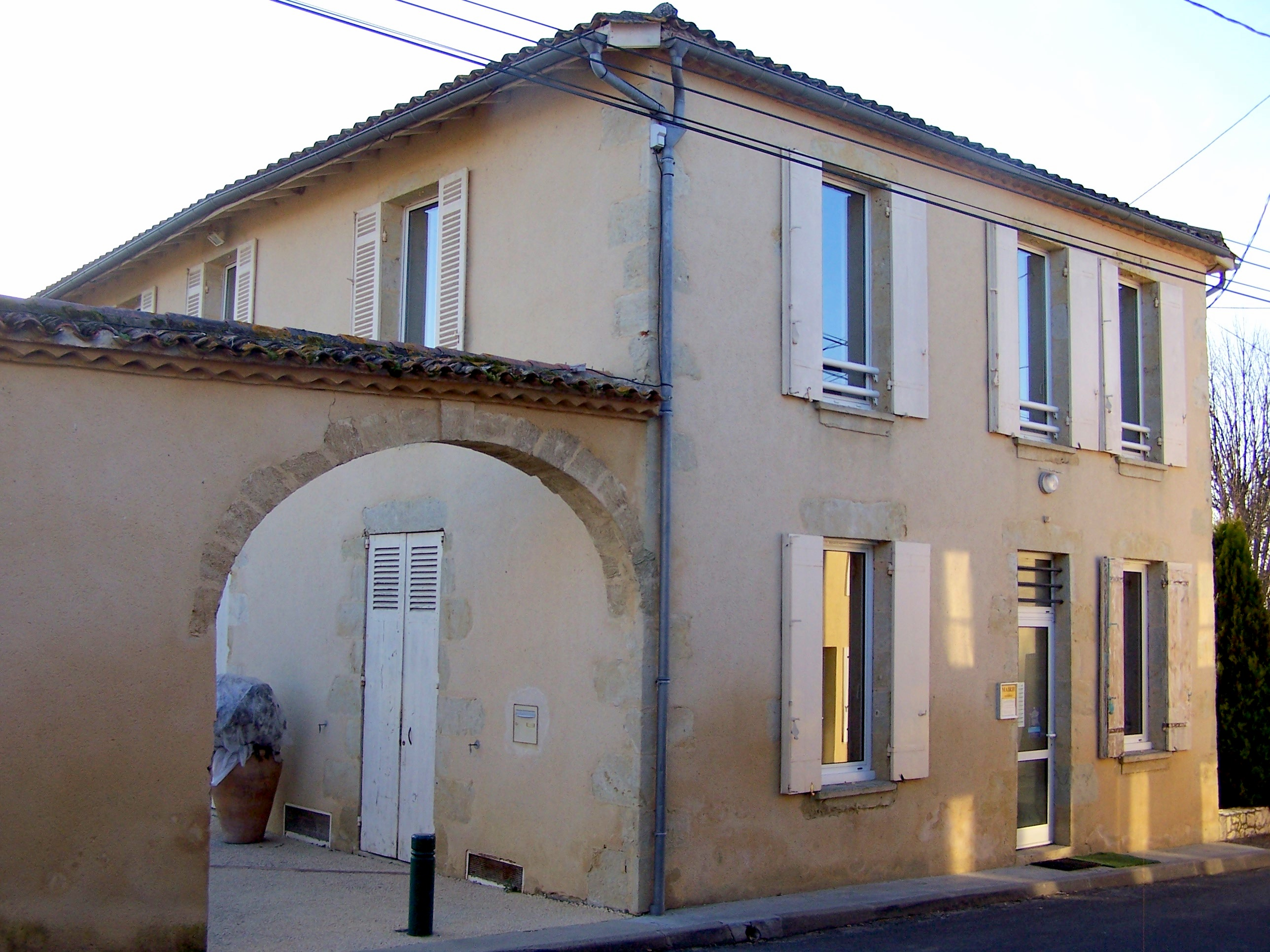
- Town hall
- Location of Les Esseintes
- Location within France Location within Nouvelle-Aquitaine
- Coordinates: 44°36′38″N 0°03′59″W
- Country: France
- Region: Nouvelle-Aquitaine
- Department: Gironde
- Arrondissement: Langon
- Canton: Le Réolais et Les Bastides
- Intercommunality: Réolais en Sud Gironde

Government
  - Mayor (2020–2026): Marie-Françoise Mauriac
- Area^{1}: 5.1 km^{2} (2.0 sq mi)
- Elevation: 60 m (200 ft)
- Highest elevation: 94 m (308 ft)
- Lowest elevation: 11 m (36 ft)
- Population (2023): 244
  - Density: 48/km^{2} (120/sq mi)
- Time zone: UTC+01:00 (CET)
  - Summer (DST): UTC+02:00 (CEST)
- INSEE/Postal code: 33158 /33190
- ^{1} French Land Register data, which excludes lakes, ponds, glaciers > 1 km^{2} (0.386 sq mi or 247 acres) and river estuaries.

Les Esseintes (French pronunciation: [le.z‿ɛsɛ̃t]; Occitan: Las Essentas) is a commune in the Gironde department in southwestern France.

== Population ==
Historical population
Year	Pop.	±% p.a.
1968	234	—
1975	201	−2.15%
1982	174	−2.04%
1990	194	+1.37%
1999	218	+1.30%
2007	284	+3.36%
2012	267	−1.23%
2017	238	−2.27%
2023	244	+0.42%
Source: INSEE

== See also ==
- Communes of the Gironde department
