= Saint-Philippe-du-Seignal =

Saint Philippe du Seignal
- Commune
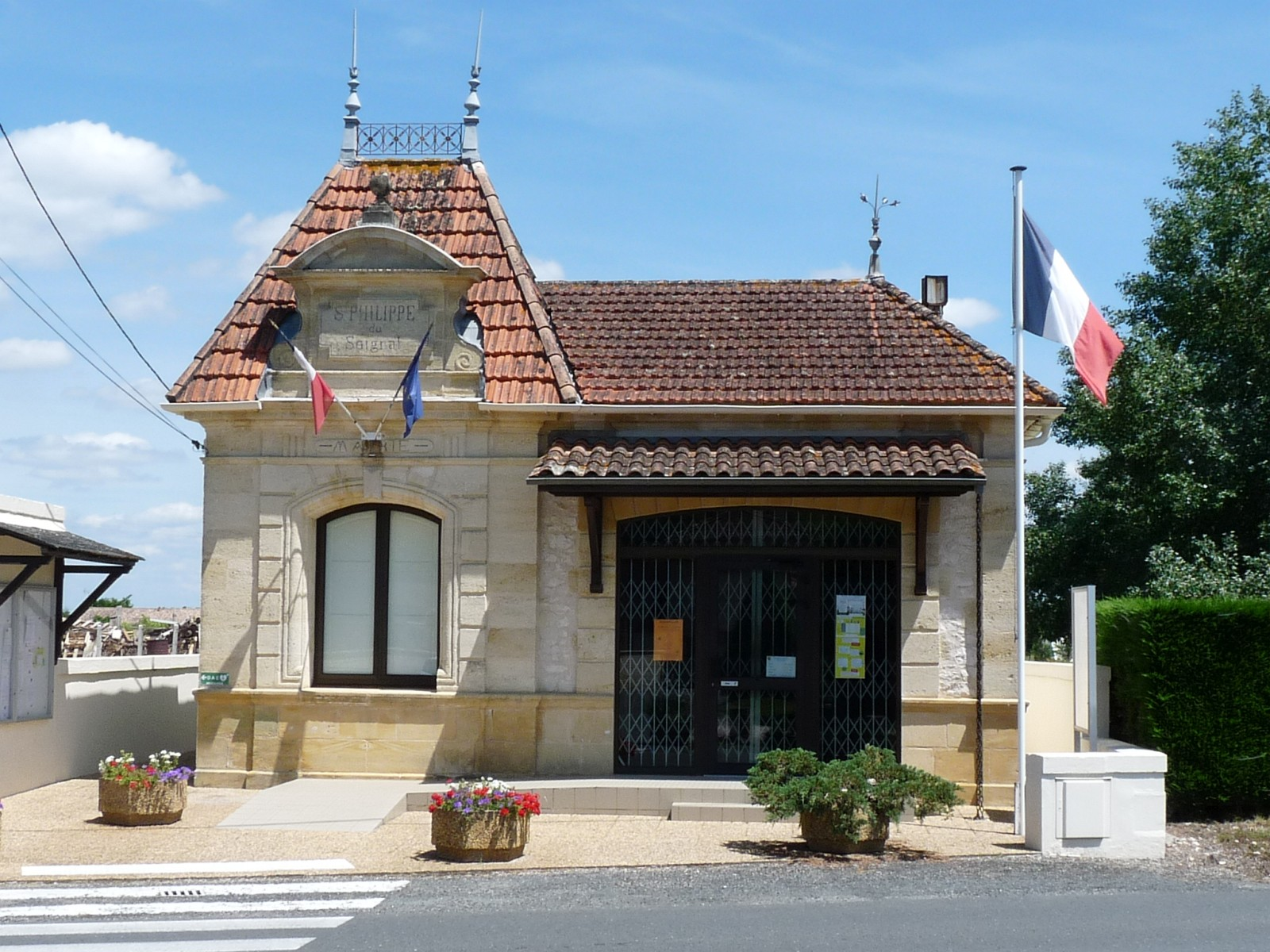
- The town hall in Saint-Philippe-du-Seignal
- Location of Saint Philippe du Seignal
- Location within France Location within Nouvelle-Aquitaine
- Coordinates: 44°49′42″N 0°15′20″E
- Country: France
- Region: Nouvelle-Aquitaine
- Department: Gironde
- Arrondissement: Libourne
- Canton: Le Réolais et Les Bastides
- Intercommunality: Pays Foyen

Government
  - Mayor (2020–2026): Jean-Claude Vacher
- Area^{1}: 3.38 km^{2} (1.31 sq mi)
- Elevation: 27 m (89 ft)
- Highest elevation: 113 m (371 ft)
- Lowest elevation: 20 m (66 ft)
- Population (2023): 496
  - Density: 147/km^{2} (380/sq mi)
- Time zone: UTC+01:00 (CET)
  - Summer (DST): UTC+02:00 (CEST)
- INSEE/Postal code: 33462 /33220
- ^{1} French Land Register data, which excludes lakes, ponds, glaciers > 1 km^{2} (0.386 sq mi or 247 acres) and river estuaries.

Saint-Philippe-du-Seignal (French pronunciation: [sɛ̃ filip dy sɛɲal]; Occitan: Sant Filipe deu Senhal) is a commune in the Gironde department in Nouvelle-Aquitaine in southwestern France.

== Population ==
Historical population
Year	Pop.	±% p.a.
1968	249	—
1975	289	+2.15%
1982	342	+2.43%
1990	389	+1.62%
1999	394	+0.14%
2007	454	+1.79%
2012	474	+0.87%
2017	476	+0.08%
2023	496	+0.69%
Source: INSEE

== See also ==
- Communes of the Gironde department
