= Noaillac =

- Commune
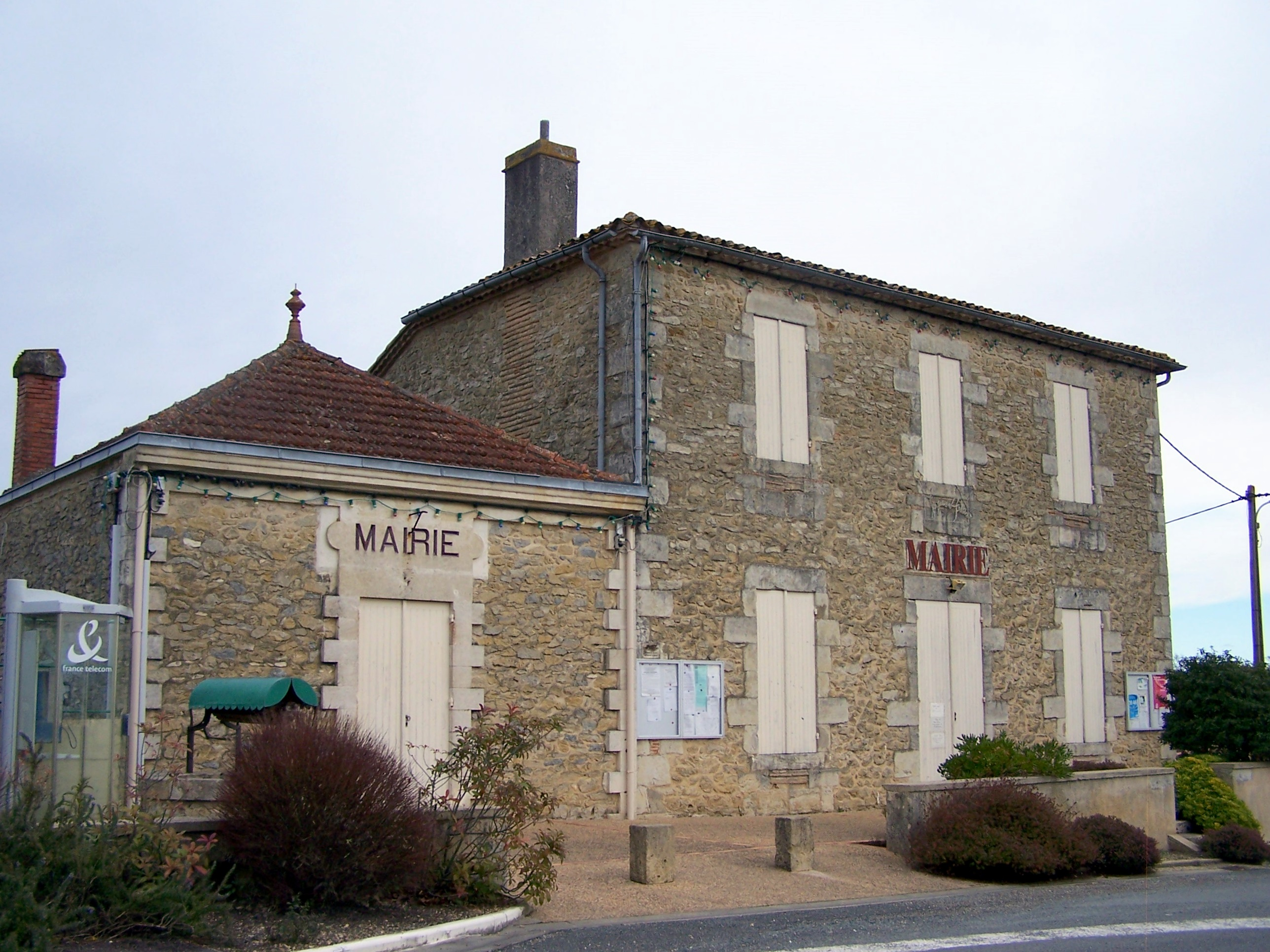
- Town hall
- Location of Noaillac
- Location within France Location within Nouvelle-Aquitaine
- Coordinates: 44°31′01″N 0°00′35″W
- Country: France
- Region: Nouvelle-Aquitaine
- Department: Gironde
- Arrondissement: Langon
- Canton: Le Réolais et Les Bastides
- Intercommunality: Réolais en Sud Gironde

Government
  - Mayor (2020–2026): Christine Lebon
- Area^{1}: 7.94 km^{2} (3.07 sq mi)
- Elevation: 45 m (148 ft)
- Highest elevation: 70 m (230 ft)
- Lowest elevation: 22 m (72 ft)
- Population (2023): 552
  - Density: 69.5/km^{2} (180/sq mi)
- Time zone: UTC+01:00 (CET)
  - Summer (DST): UTC+02:00 (CEST)
- INSEE/Postal code: 33306 /33190
- ^{1} French Land Register data, which excludes lakes, ponds, glaciers > 1 km^{2} (0.386 sq mi or 247 acres) and river estuaries.

Noaillac (French pronunciation: [nɔajak]; Occitan: Noalhac) is a commune in the Gironde department in Nouvelle-Aquitaine in southwestern France.

== Population ==
Historical population
Year	Pop.	±% p.a.
1968	307	—
1975	267	−1.97%
1982	233	−1.93%
1990	252	+0.98%
1999	291	+1.61%
2007	385	+3.56%
2012	404	+0.97%
2017	466	+2.90%
2023	552	+2.86%
Source: INSEE

== See also ==
- Communes of the Gironde department
