= Daubèze =

- Commune
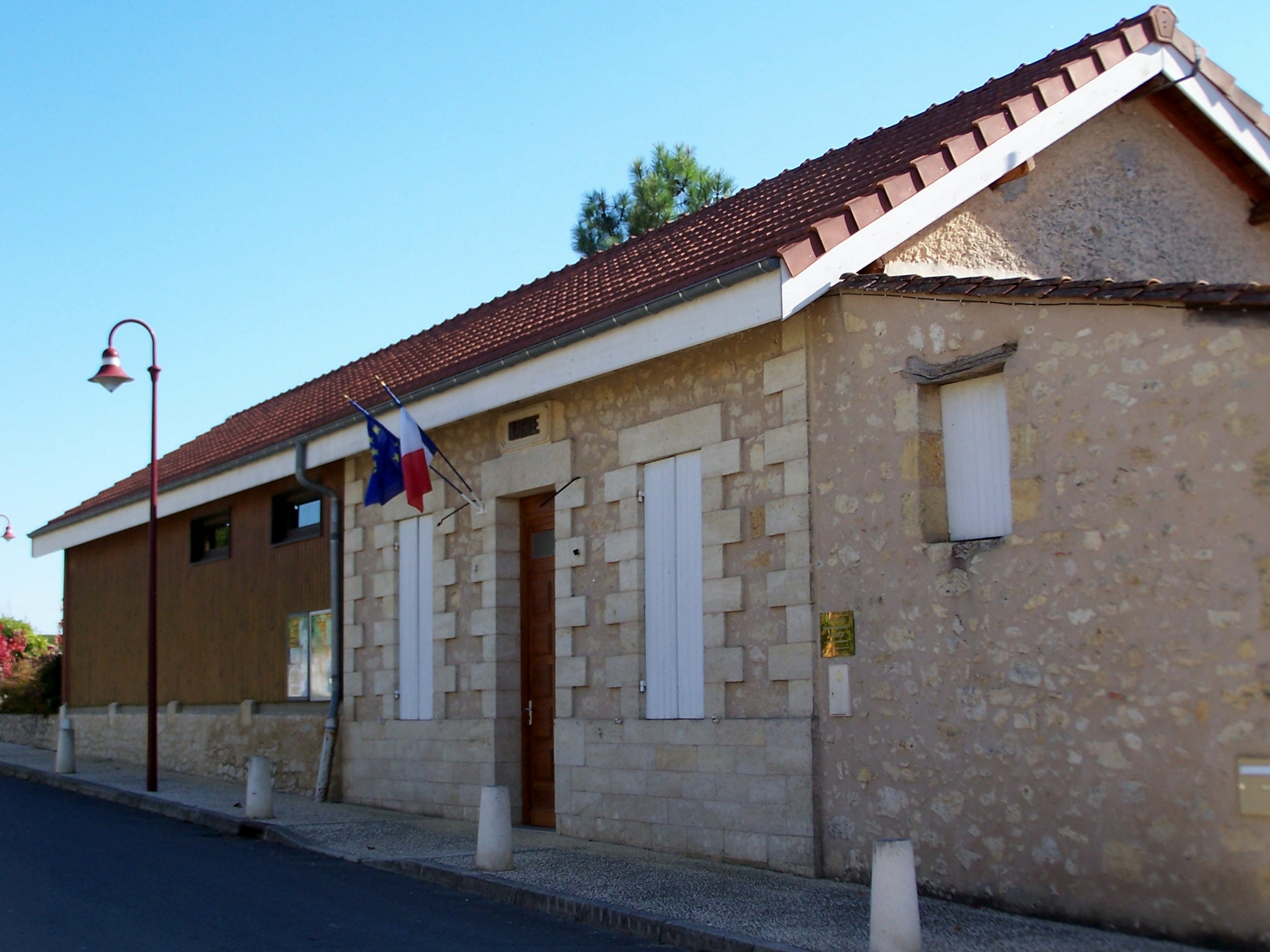
- Town hall
- Location of Daubèze
- Location within France Location within Nouvelle-Aquitaine
- Coordinates: 44°42′48″N 0°08′24″W
- Country: France
- Region: Nouvelle-Aquitaine
- Department: Gironde
- Arrondissement: Langon
- Canton: Le Réolais et Les Bastides

Government
  - Mayor (2020–2026): Christiane Dulong
- Area^{1}: 5.63 km^{2} (2.17 sq mi)
- Elevation: 70 m (230 ft)
- Highest elevation: 94 m (308 ft)
- Lowest elevation: 43 m (141 ft)
- Population (2023): 143
  - Density: 25.4/km^{2} (65.8/sq mi)
- Time zone: UTC+01:00 (CET)
  - Summer (DST): UTC+02:00 (CEST)
- INSEE/Postal code: 33149 /33540
- ^{1} French Land Register data, which excludes lakes, ponds, glaciers > 1 km^{2} (0.386 sq mi or 247 acres) and river estuaries.

Daubèze (French pronunciation: [dobɛz]; Occitan: Daubesa) is a commune in the Gironde department in southwestern France.

== Population ==
Historical population
Year	Pop.	±% p.a.
1968	102	—
1975	77	−3.94%
1982	109	+5.09%
1990	123	+1.52%
1999	138	+1.29%
2007	151	+1.13%
2012	151	+0.00%
2017	153	+0.26%
2023	143	−1.12%
Source: INSEE

== See also ==
- Communes of the Gironde department
