= Camiran =

- Commune
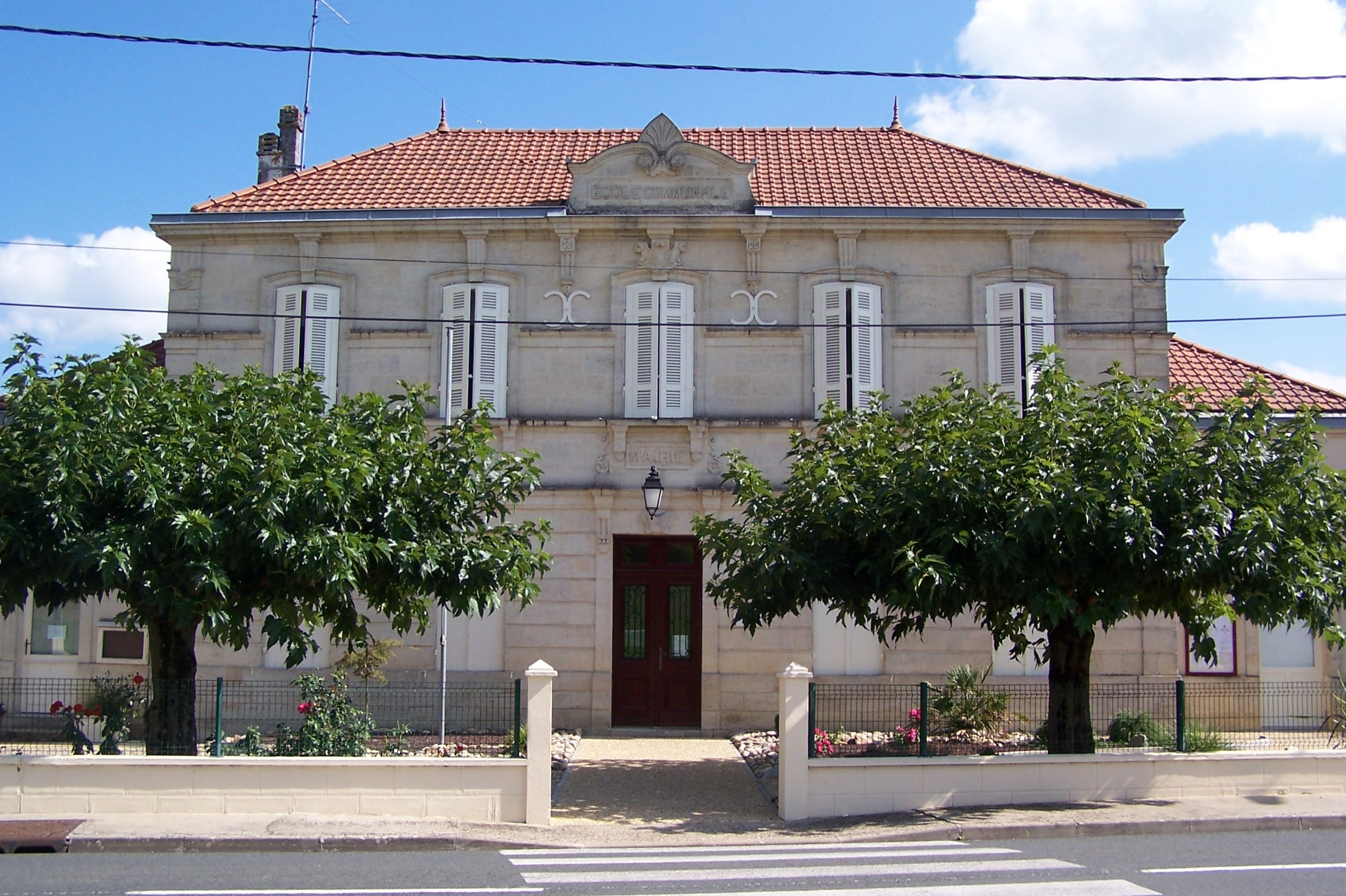
- Town hall
- Location of Camiran
- Location within France Location within Nouvelle-Aquitaine
- Coordinates: 44°37′47″N 0°04′08″W
- Country: France
- Region: Nouvelle-Aquitaine
- Department: Gironde
- Arrondissement: Langon
- Canton: Le Réolais et Les Bastides
- Intercommunality: Réolais en Sud Gironde

Government
  - Mayor (2020–2026): Bastien Mercier
- Area^{1}: 5.8 km^{2} (2.2 sq mi)
- Elevation: 17 m (56 ft)
- Highest elevation: 83 m (272 ft)
- Lowest elevation: 11 m (36 ft)
- Population (2023): 419
  - Density: 72/km^{2} (190/sq mi)
- Time zone: UTC+01:00 (CET)
  - Summer (DST): UTC+02:00 (CEST)
- INSEE/Postal code: 33087 /33190
- ^{1} French Land Register data, which excludes lakes, ponds, glaciers > 1 km^{2} (0.386 sq mi or 247 acres) and river estuaries.

Camiran (French pronunciation: [kamiʁɑ̃]) is a commune in the Gironde department in Nouvelle-Aquitaine in southwestern France.

== Population ==
Historical population
| Year | Pop. | ±% p.a. |
|---|---|---|
| 1968 | 410 | — |
| 1975 | 373 | −1.34% |
| 1982 | 364 | −0.35% |
| 1990 | 388 | +0.80% |
| 1999 | 443 | +1.48% |
| 2007 | 436 | −0.20% |
| 2012 | 426 | −0.46% |
| 2017 | 412 | −0.67% |
| 2023 | 419 | +0.28% |
Source: INSEE

== See also ==
- Communes of the Gironde department
