= Soussac =

- Commune
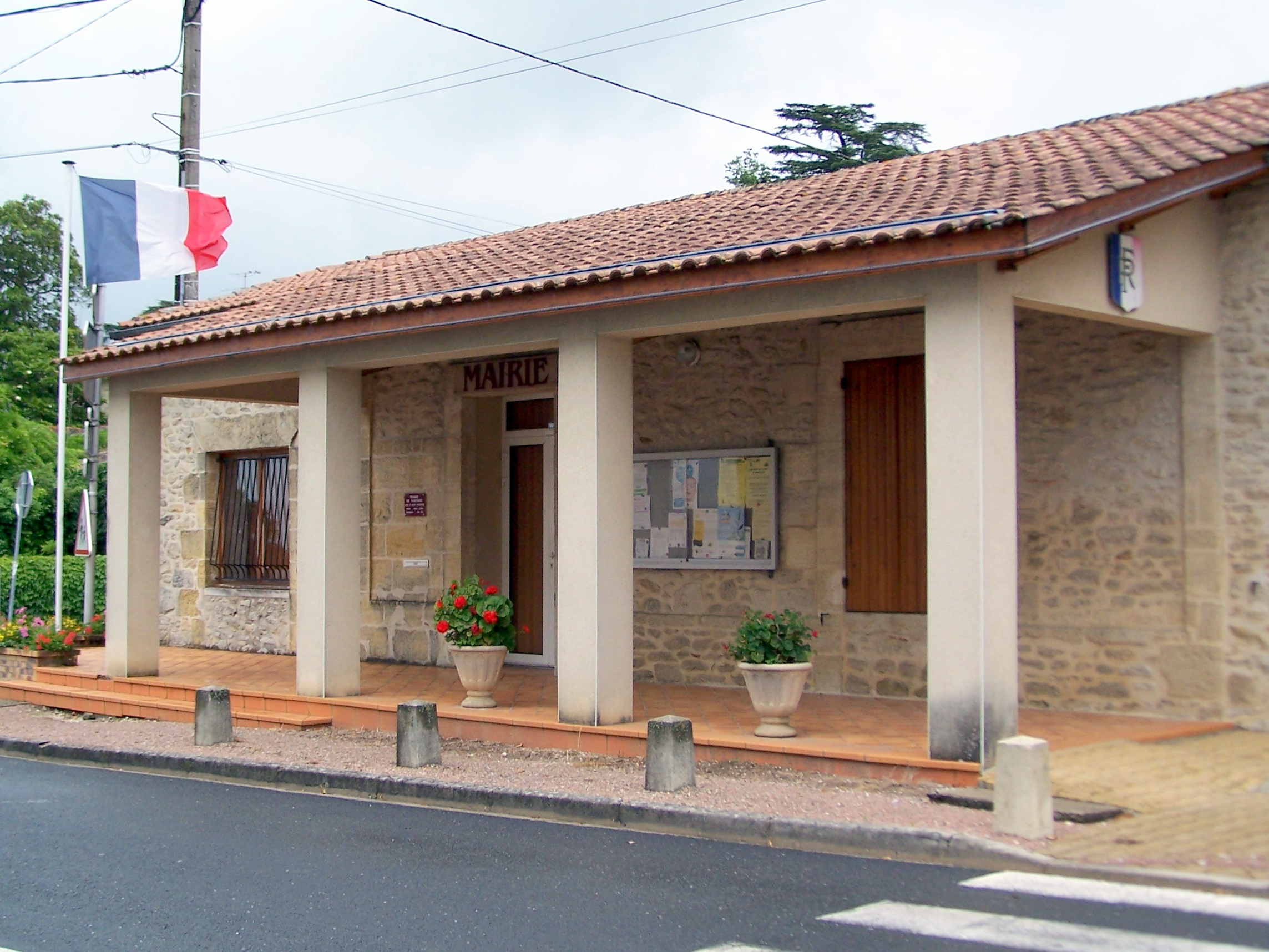
- The town hall in Soussac
- Location of Soussac
- Location within France Location within Nouvelle-Aquitaine
- Coordinates: 44°44′N 0°01′E
- Country: France
- Region: Nouvelle-Aquitaine
- Department: Gironde
- Arrondissement: Langon
- Canton: Le Réolais et Les Bastides

Government
  - Mayor (2020–2026): Myriam Regimon
- Area^{1}: 6.61 km^{2} (2.55 sq mi)
- Elevation: 100 m (330 ft)
- Highest elevation: 125 m (410 ft)
- Lowest elevation: 63 m (207 ft)
- Population (2023): 182
  - Density: 27.5/km^{2} (71.3/sq mi)
- Time zone: UTC+01:00 (CET)
  - Summer (DST): UTC+02:00 (CEST)
- INSEE/Postal code: 33516 /33790
- ^{1} French Land Register data, which excludes lakes, ponds, glaciers > 1 km^{2} (0.386 sq mi or 247 acres) and river estuaries.

Soussac (French pronunciation: [susak]; Occitan: Sossac) is a commune in the Gironde department in Nouvelle-Aquitaine in southwestern France.

== Population ==
Historical population
Year	Pop.	±% p.a.
1968	260	—
1975	221	−2.29%
1982	230	+0.57%
1990	195	−2.04%
1999	159	−2.24%
2007	178	+1.42%
2012	178	+0.00%
2017	190	+1.31%
2023	182	−0.71%
Source: INSEE

== See also ==
- Communes of the Gironde department
