= Coutures, Gironde =

Coutures
- Commune
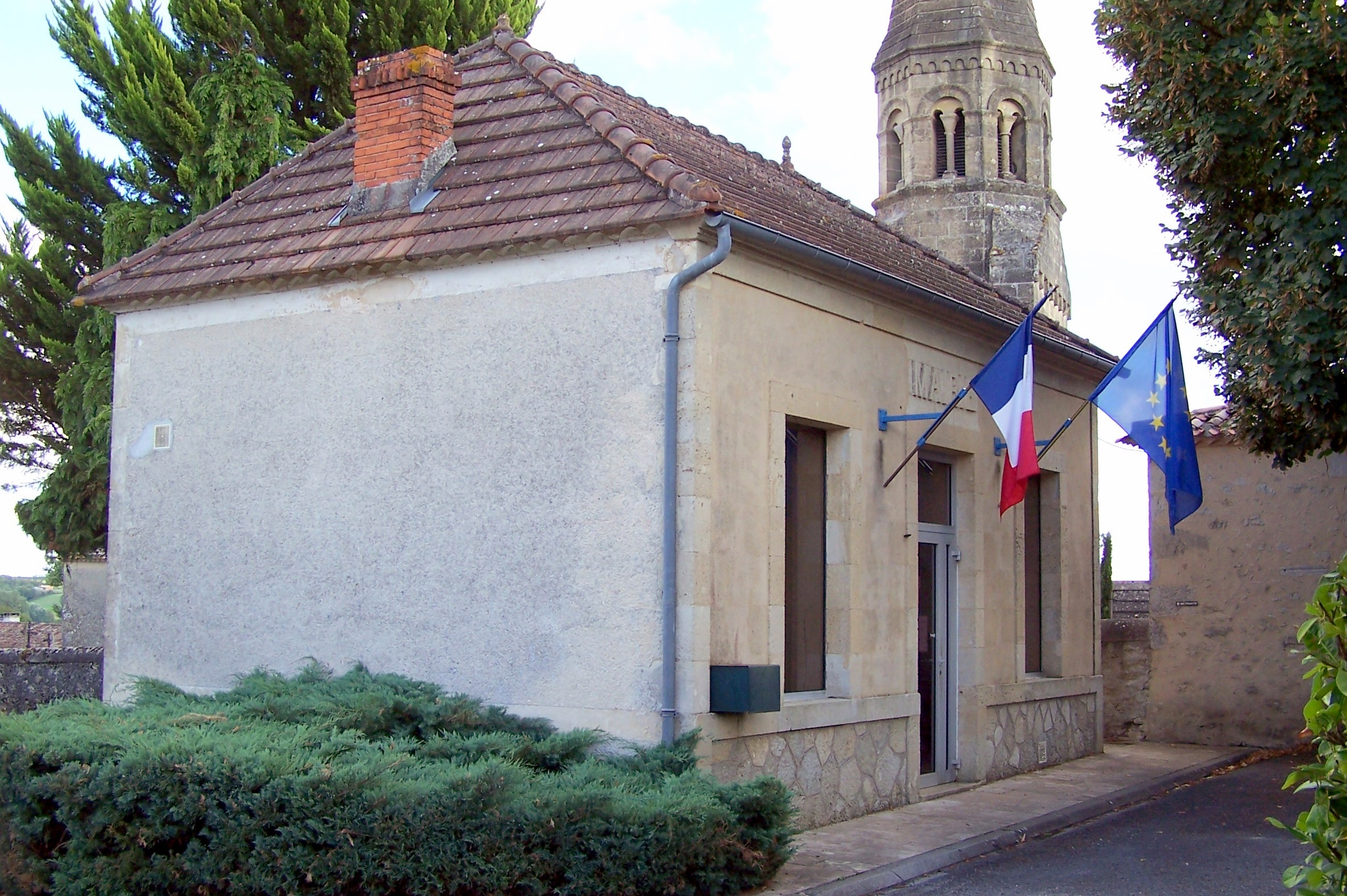
- Town hall
- Location of Coutures
- Location within France Location within Nouvelle-Aquitaine
- Coordinates: 44°38′44″N 0°01′47″E
- Country: France
- Region: Nouvelle-Aquitaine
- Department: Gironde
- Arrondissement: Langon
- Canton: Le Réolais et Les Bastides

Government
  - Mayor (2020–2026): Valérie Hatron
- Area^{1}: 3.4 km^{2} (1.3 sq mi)
- Elevation: 42 m (138 ft)
- Highest elevation: 105 m (344 ft)
- Lowest elevation: 17 m (56 ft)
- Population (2023): 89
  - Density: 26/km^{2} (68/sq mi)
- Time zone: UTC+01:00 (CET)
  - Summer (DST): UTC+02:00 (CEST)
- INSEE/Postal code: 33139 /33580
- ^{1} French Land Register data, which excludes lakes, ponds, glaciers > 1 km^{2} (0.386 sq mi or 247 acres) and river estuaries.

Coutures (French pronunciation: [kutyʁ]; Occitan: Còuturas) is a commune in the Gironde department in Nouvelle-Aquitaine in southwestern France.

== Population ==
Historical population
| Year | Pop. | ±% p.a. |
|---|---|---|
| 1968 | 92 | — |
| 1975 | 90 | −0.31% |
| 1982 | 84 | −0.98% |
| 1990 | 70 | −2.25% |
| 1999 | 65 | −0.82% |
| 2007 | 84 | +3.26% |
| 2012 | 99 | +3.34% |
| 2017 | 96 | −0.61% |
| 2023 | 89 | −1.25% |
Source: INSEE

== See also ==
- Communes of the Gironde department
