= Massugas =

- Commune
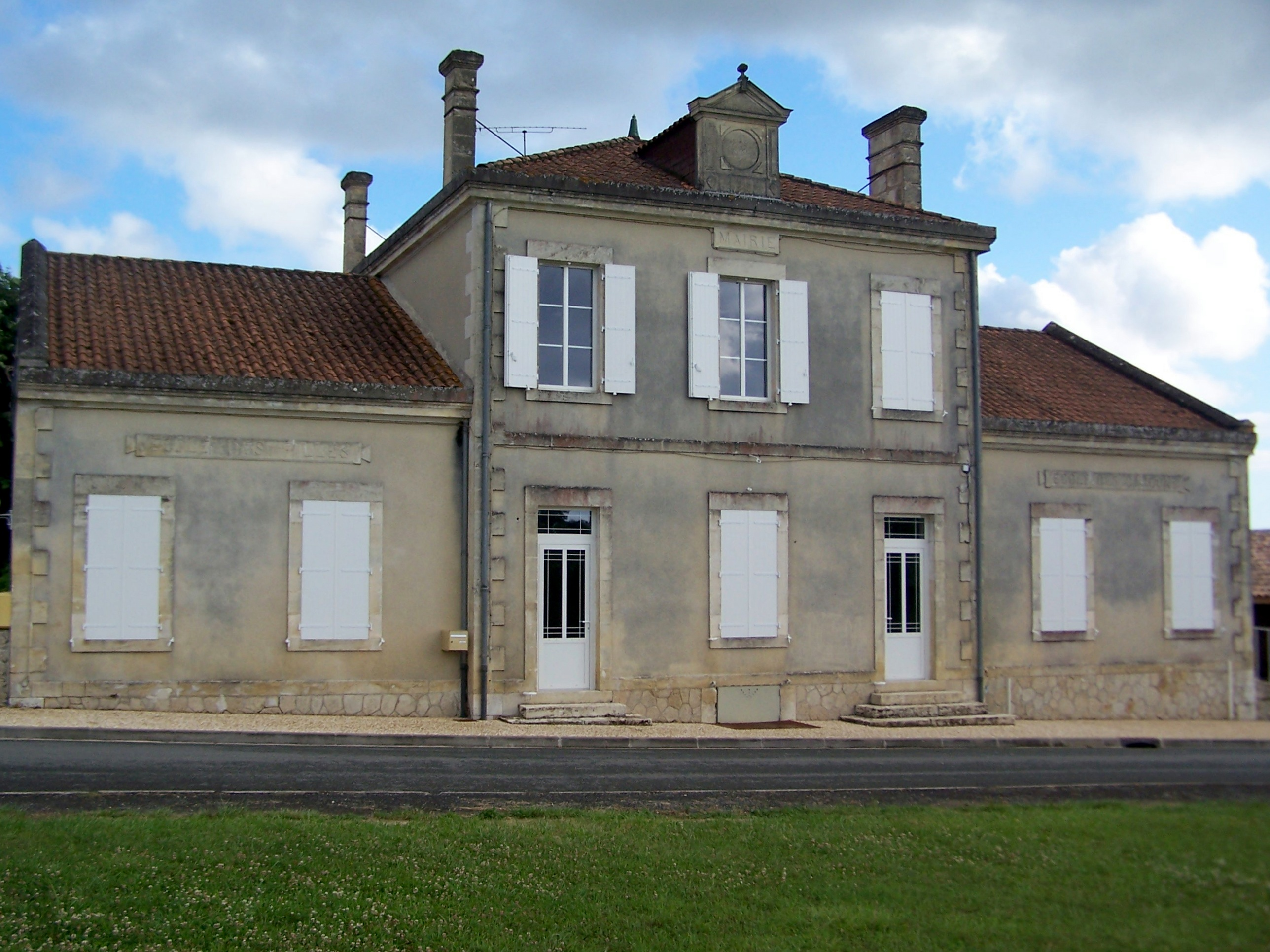
- Town hall
- Location of Massugas
- Location within France Location within Nouvelle-Aquitaine
- Coordinates: 44°46′09″N 0°05′12″E
- Country: France
- Region: Nouvelle-Aquitaine
- Department: Gironde
- Arrondissement: Langon
- Canton: Le Réolais et Les Bastides

Government
  - Mayor (2020–2026): Yolande Lachaize
- Area^{1}: 14.41 km^{2} (5.56 sq mi)
- Elevation: 100 m (330 ft)
- Highest elevation: 118 m (387 ft)
- Lowest elevation: 30 m (98 ft)
- Population (2023): 214
  - Density: 14.9/km^{2} (38.5/sq mi)
- Time zone: UTC+01:00 (CET)
  - Summer (DST): UTC+02:00 (CEST)
- INSEE/Postal code: 33277 /33790
- ^{1} French Land Register data, which excludes lakes, ponds, glaciers > 1 km^{2} (0.386 sq mi or 247 acres) and river estuaries.

Massugas is a commune in the Gironde department in Nouvelle-Aquitaine in southwestern France.

== Population ==
Historical population
Year	Pop.	±% p.a.
1968	365	—
1975	255	−4.99%
1982	240	−0.86%
1990	268	+1.39%
1999	258	−0.42%
2007	280	+1.03%
2012	251	−2.16%
2017	227	−1.99%
2023	214	−0.98%
Source: INSEE

== See also ==
- Communes of the Gironde department
