= Coimères =

- Commune
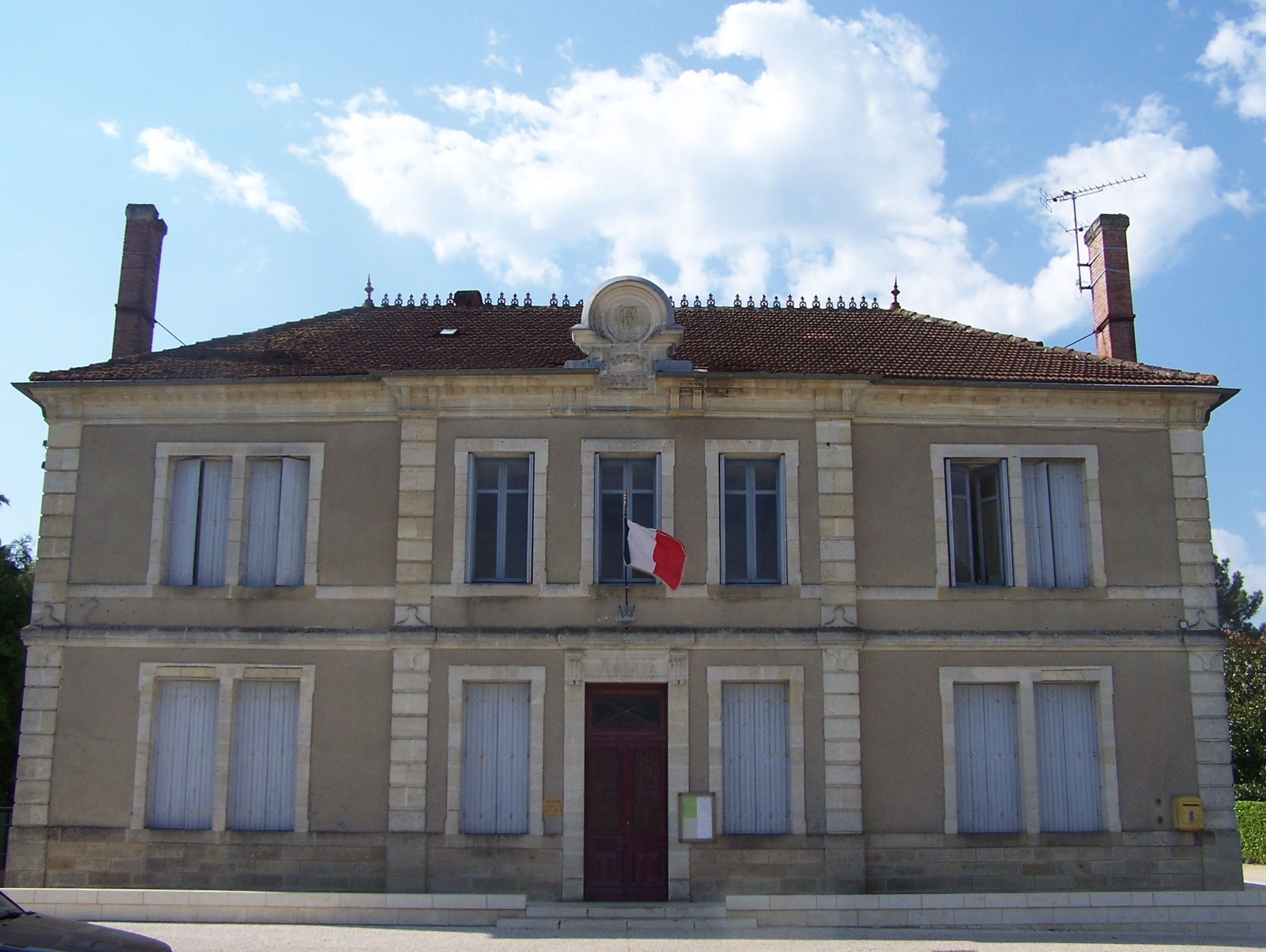
- Town hall
- Location of Coimères
- Location within France Location within Nouvelle-Aquitaine
- Coordinates: 44°29′50″N 0°12′31″W
- Country: France
- Region: Nouvelle-Aquitaine
- Department: Gironde
- Arrondissement: Langon
- Canton: Le Réolais et Les Bastides

Government
  - Mayor (2024–2026): Christian Decouche
- Area^{1}: 12.91 km^{2} (4.98 sq mi)
- Elevation: 113 m (371 ft)
- Highest elevation: 122 m (400 ft)
- Lowest elevation: 40 m (130 ft)
- Population (2023): 1,103
  - Density: 85.44/km^{2} (221.3/sq mi)
- Time zone: UTC+01:00 (CET)
  - Summer (DST): UTC+02:00 (CEST)
- INSEE/Postal code: 33130 /33210
- ^{1} French Land Register data, which excludes lakes, ponds, glaciers > 1 km^{2} (0.386 sq mi or 247 acres) and river estuaries.

Coimères (French pronunciation: [kwamɛʁ]; Occitan: Coimèras) is a commune in the Gironde department in Nouvelle-Aquitaine in southwestern France.

== Population ==
Historical population
Year	Pop.	±% p.a.
1968	369	—
1975	356	−0.51%
1982	388	+1.24%
1990	583	+5.22%
1999	657	+1.34%
2007	724	+1.22%
2012	904	+4.54%
2017	1,034	+2.72%
2023	1,103	+1.08%
Source: INSEE

== See also ==
- Communes of the Gironde department
