= Casseuil =

- Commune
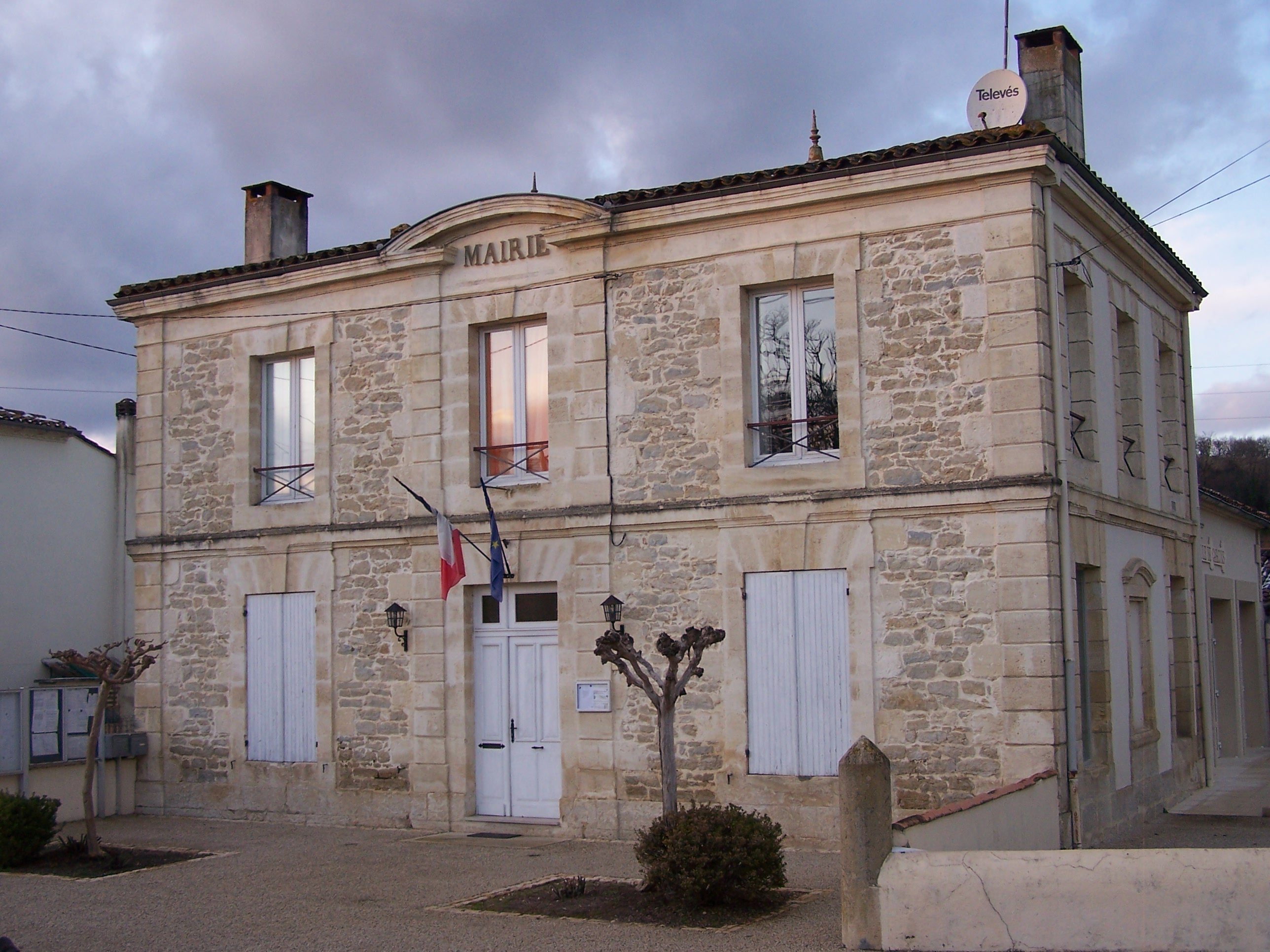
- The town hall in Casseuil
- Location of Casseuil
- Location within France Location within Nouvelle-Aquitaine
- Coordinates: 44°35′11″N 0°06′48″W
- Country: France
- Region: Nouvelle-Aquitaine
- Department: Gironde
- Arrondissement: Langon
- Canton: Le Réolais et Les Bastides

Government
  - Mayor (2020–2026): François Merveilleau
- Area^{1}: 6.34 km^{2} (2.45 sq mi)
- Elevation: 18 m (59 ft)
- Highest elevation: 122 m (400 ft)
- Lowest elevation: 8 m (26 ft)
- Population (2023): 363
  - Density: 57.3/km^{2} (148/sq mi)
- Time zone: UTC+01:00 (CET)
  - Summer (DST): UTC+02:00 (CEST)
- INSEE/Postal code: 33102 /33190
- ^{1} French Land Register data, which excludes lakes, ponds, glaciers > 1 km^{2} (0.386 sq mi or 247 acres) and river estuaries.

Casseuil (French pronunciation: [kasœj]; Occitan: Cassulh) is a commune in the Gironde department in Nouvelle-Aquitaine in southwestern France.

== Population ==
Historical population
Year	Pop.	±% p.a.
1968	315	—
1975	347	+1.39%
1982	361	+0.57%
1990	395	+1.13%
1999	367	−0.81%
2007	357	−0.34%
2012	389	+1.73%
2017	398	+0.46%
2023	363	−1.52%
Source: INSEE

== See also ==
- Communes of the Gironde department
