= Listrac-de-Durèze =

- Commune
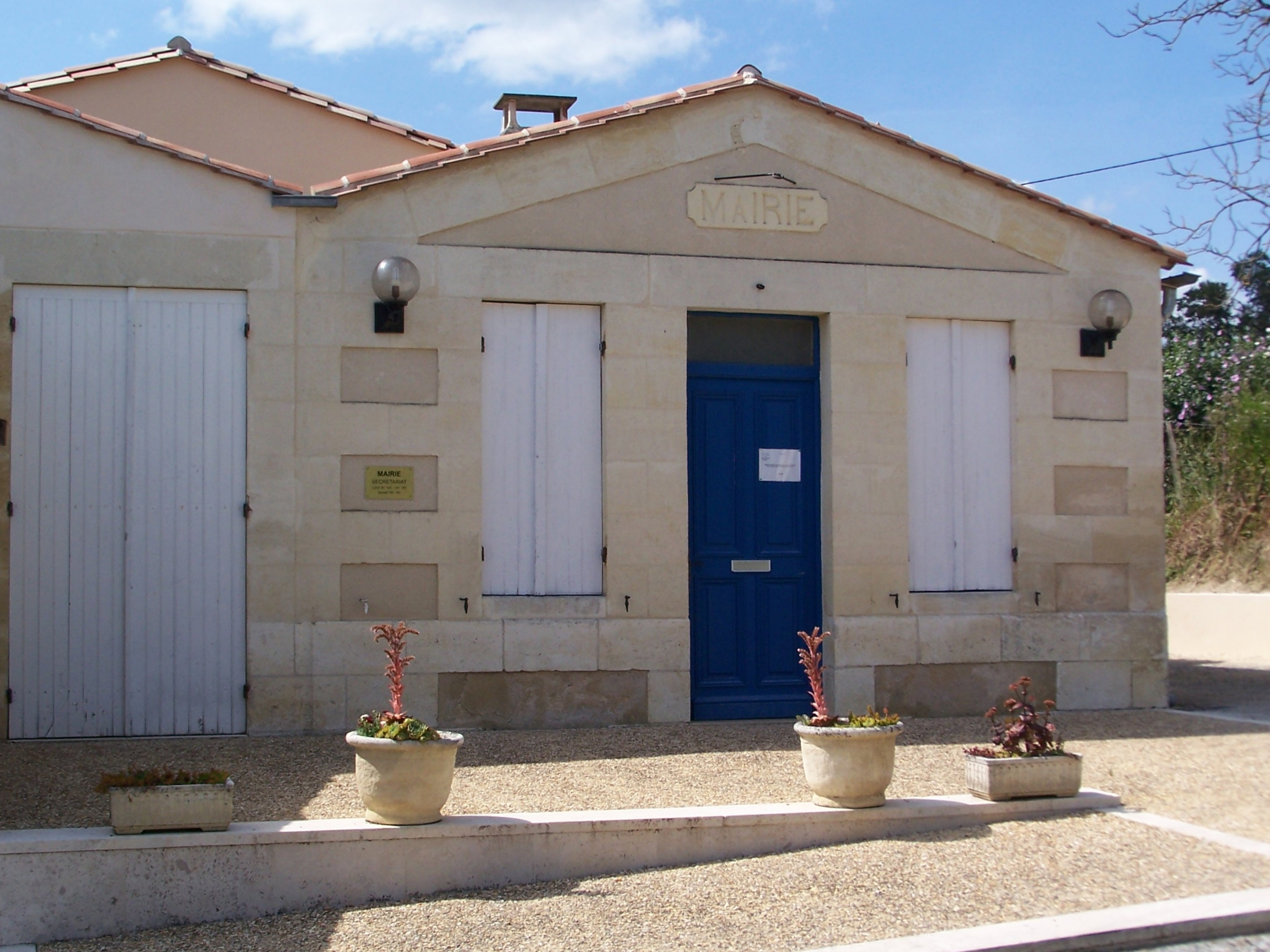
- Town hall
- Location of Listrac-de-Durèze
- Location within France Location within Nouvelle-Aquitaine
- Coordinates: 44°45′46″N 0°02′46″E
- Country: France
- Region: Nouvelle-Aquitaine
- Department: Gironde
- Arrondissement: Langon
- Canton: Le Réolais et Les Bastides

Government
  - Mayor (2020–2026): Jean-Marie Baëza
- Area^{1}: 5.31 km^{2} (2.05 sq mi)
- Elevation: 86 m (282 ft)
- Highest elevation: 115 m (377 ft)
- Lowest elevation: 36 m (118 ft)
- Population (2023): 134
  - Density: 25.2/km^{2} (65.4/sq mi)
- Time zone: UTC+01:00 (CET)
  - Summer (DST): UTC+02:00 (CEST)
- INSEE/Postal code: 33247 /33790
- ^{1} French Land Register data, which excludes lakes, ponds, glaciers > 1 km^{2} (0.386 sq mi or 247 acres) and river estuaries.

Listrac-de-Durèze is a commune in the Gironde department in Nouvelle-Aquitaine in southwestern France.

== Population ==
Historical population
Year	Pop.	±% p.a.
1968	110	—
1975	115	+0.64%
1982	92	−3.14%
1990	111	+2.37%
1999	113	+0.20%
2007	164	+4.77%
2012	177	+1.54%
2017	171	−0.69%
2023	134	−3.98%
Source: INSEE

== See also ==
- Communes of the Gironde department
