= Cazaugitat =

- Commune
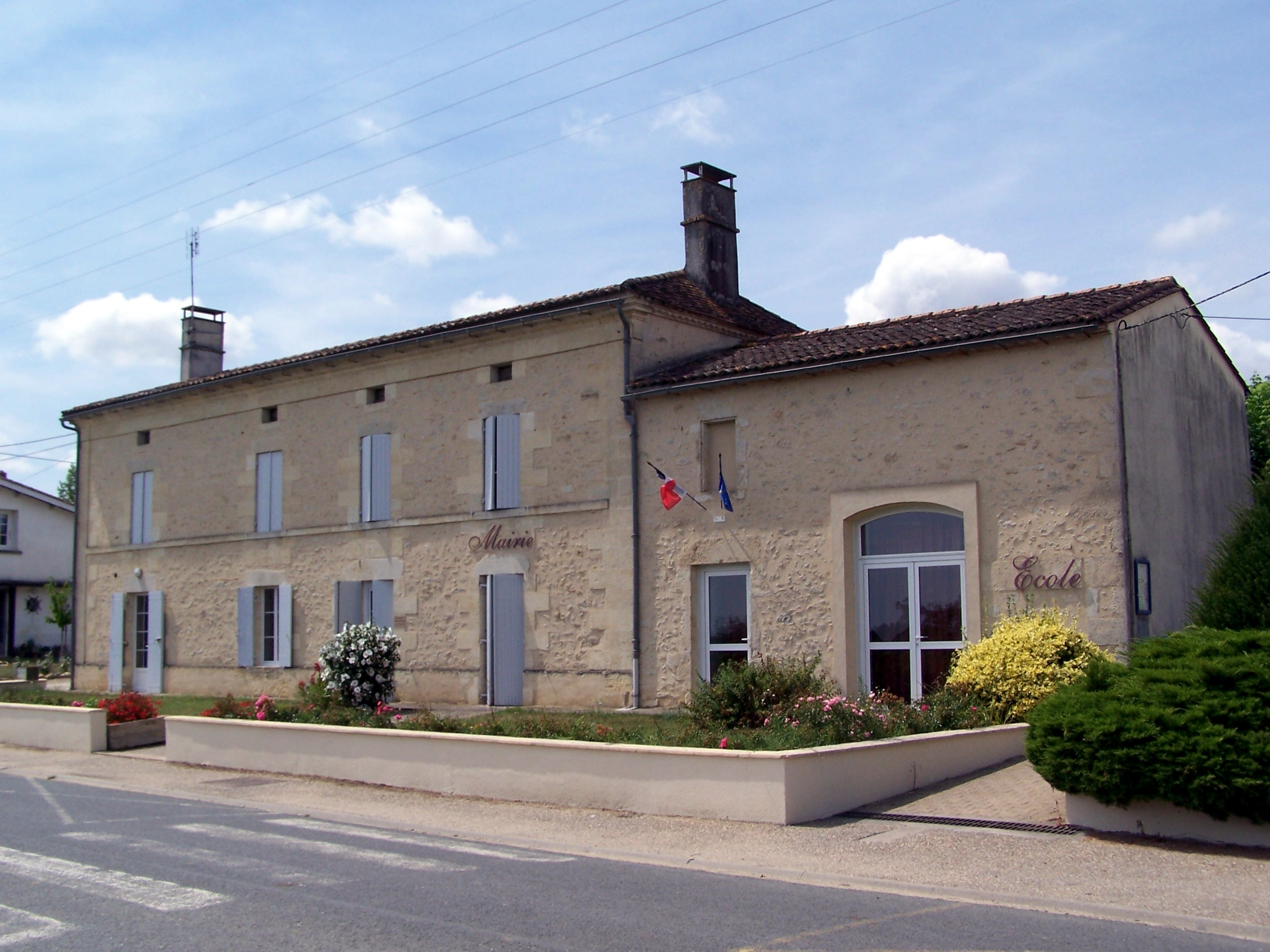
- Town hall
- Location of Cazaugitat
- Location within France Location within Nouvelle-Aquitaine
- Coordinates: 44°42′55″N 0°00′27″E
- Country: France
- Region: Nouvelle-Aquitaine
- Department: Gironde
- Arrondissement: Langon
- Canton: Le Réolais et Les Bastides

Government
  - Mayor (2020–2026): Daniel Duprat
- Area^{1}: 14.35 km^{2} (5.54 sq mi)
- Elevation: 137 m (449 ft)
- Highest elevation: 141 m (463 ft)
- Lowest elevation: 45 m (148 ft)
- Population (2023): 220
  - Density: 15/km^{2} (40/sq mi)
- Time zone: UTC+01:00 (CET)
  - Summer (DST): UTC+02:00 (CEST)
- INSEE/Postal code: 33117 /33790
- ^{1} French Land Register data, which excludes lakes, ponds, glaciers > 1 km^{2} (0.386 sq mi or 247 acres) and river estuaries.

Cazaugitat is a commune in the Gironde department in Nouvelle-Aquitaine in southwestern France.

== Population ==
Historical population
Year	Pop.	±% p.a.
1968	323	—
1975	294	−1.33%
1982	236	−3.09%
1990	212	−1.33%
1999	223	+0.56%
2007	249	+1.39%
2012	241	−0.65%
2017	244	+0.25%
2023	220	−1.71%
Source: INSEE

== See also ==
- Communes of the Gironde department
