= Saint-Avit-de-Soulège =

- Commune
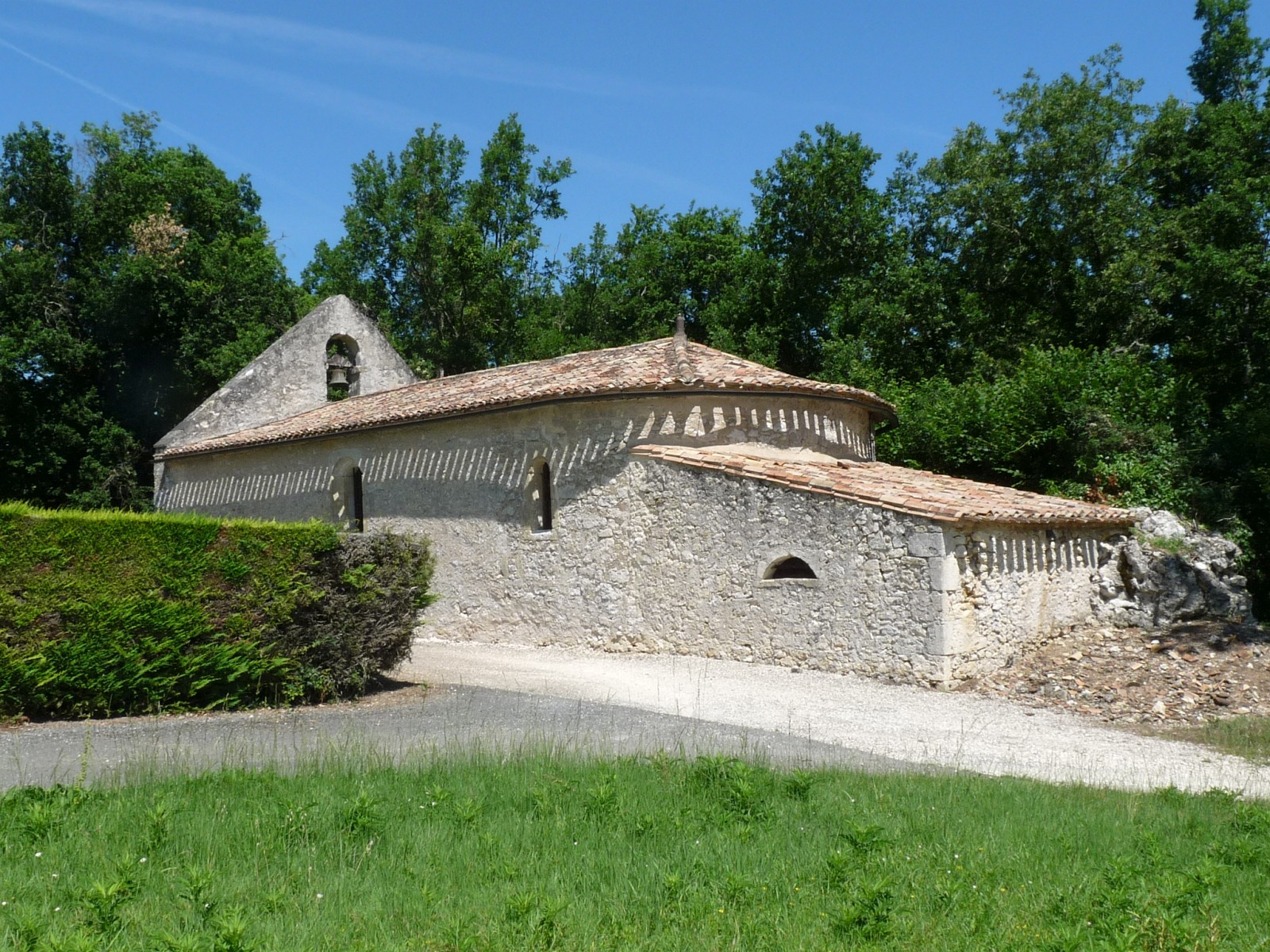
- The church in Saint-Avit-de-Soulège
- Location of Saint-Avit-de-Soulège
- Location within France Location within Nouvelle-Aquitaine
- Coordinates: 44°48′51″N 0°07′36″E
- Country: France
- Region: Nouvelle-Aquitaine
- Department: Gironde
- Arrondissement: Libourne
- Canton: Le Réolais et Les Bastides
- Intercommunality: Pays Foyen

Government
  - Mayor (2020–2026): Jean Paul Pailhet
- Area^{1}: 2.84 km^{2} (1.10 sq mi)
- Elevation: 75 m (246 ft)
- Highest elevation: 99 m (325 ft)
- Lowest elevation: 9 m (30 ft)
- Population (2023): 83
  - Density: 29/km^{2} (76/sq mi)
- Time zone: UTC+01:00 (CET)
  - Summer (DST): UTC+02:00 (CEST)
- INSEE/Postal code: 33377 /33220
- ^{1} French Land Register data, which excludes lakes, ponds, glaciers > 1 km^{2} (0.386 sq mi or 247 acres) and river estuaries.

Saint-Avit-de-Soulège (French pronunciation: [sɛ̃.t‿avi də sulɛʒ]; Occitan: Sent Avit de Soletge) is a commune in the Gironde department in Nouvelle-Aquitaine in southwestern France.

== Population ==
Historical population
Year	Pop.	±% p.a.
1968	90	—
1975	83	−1.15%
1982	75	−1.44%
1990	89	+2.16%
1999	93	+0.49%
2007	74	−2.82%
2012	78	+1.06%
2017	78	+0.00%
2023	83	+1.04%
Source: INSEE

== See also ==
- Communes of the Gironde department
