= Mauriac, Gironde =

Mauriac
- Commune
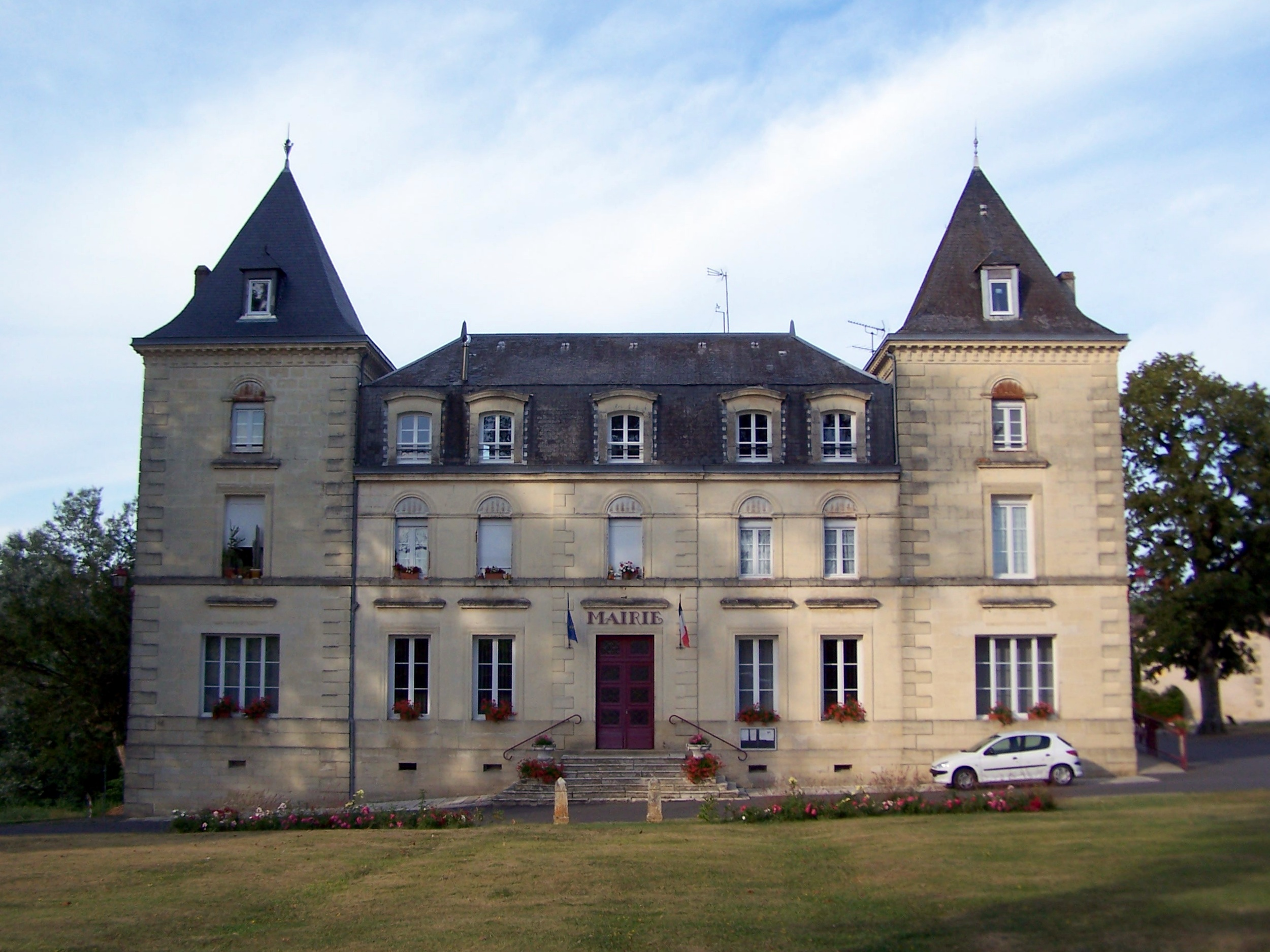
- Town hall

- Coat of arms
- Location of Mauriac
- Location within France Location within Nouvelle-Aquitaine
- Coordinates: 44°44′42″N 0°01′50″W
- Country: France
- Region: Nouvelle-Aquitaine
- Department: Gironde
- Arrondissement: Langon
- Canton: Le Réolais et Les Bastides

Government
  - Mayor (2020–2026): Jean-Marie Viaud
- Area^{1}: 10.02 km^{2} (3.87 sq mi)
- Elevation: 70 m (230 ft)
- Highest elevation: 112 m (367 ft)
- Lowest elevation: 37 m (121 ft)
- Population (2023): 230
  - Density: 23/km^{2} (59/sq mi)
- Time zone: UTC+01:00 (CET)
  - Summer (DST): UTC+02:00 (CEST)
- INSEE/Postal code: 33278 /33540
- ^{1} French Land Register data, which excludes lakes, ponds, glaciers > 1 km^{2} (0.386 sq mi or 247 acres) and river estuaries.

Mauriac (French pronunciation: [moʁjak]) is a commune in the Gironde department in Nouvelle-Aquitaine in southwestern France.

== Population ==
Historical population
Year	Pop.	±% p.a.
1968	264	—
1975	219	−2.63%
1982	228	+0.58%
1990	230	+0.11%
1999	225	−0.24%
2007	243	+0.97%
2012	276	+2.58%
2017	244	−2.43%
2023	230	−0.98%
Source: INSEE

== See also ==
- Communes of the Gironde department
