= Dieulivol =

- Commune
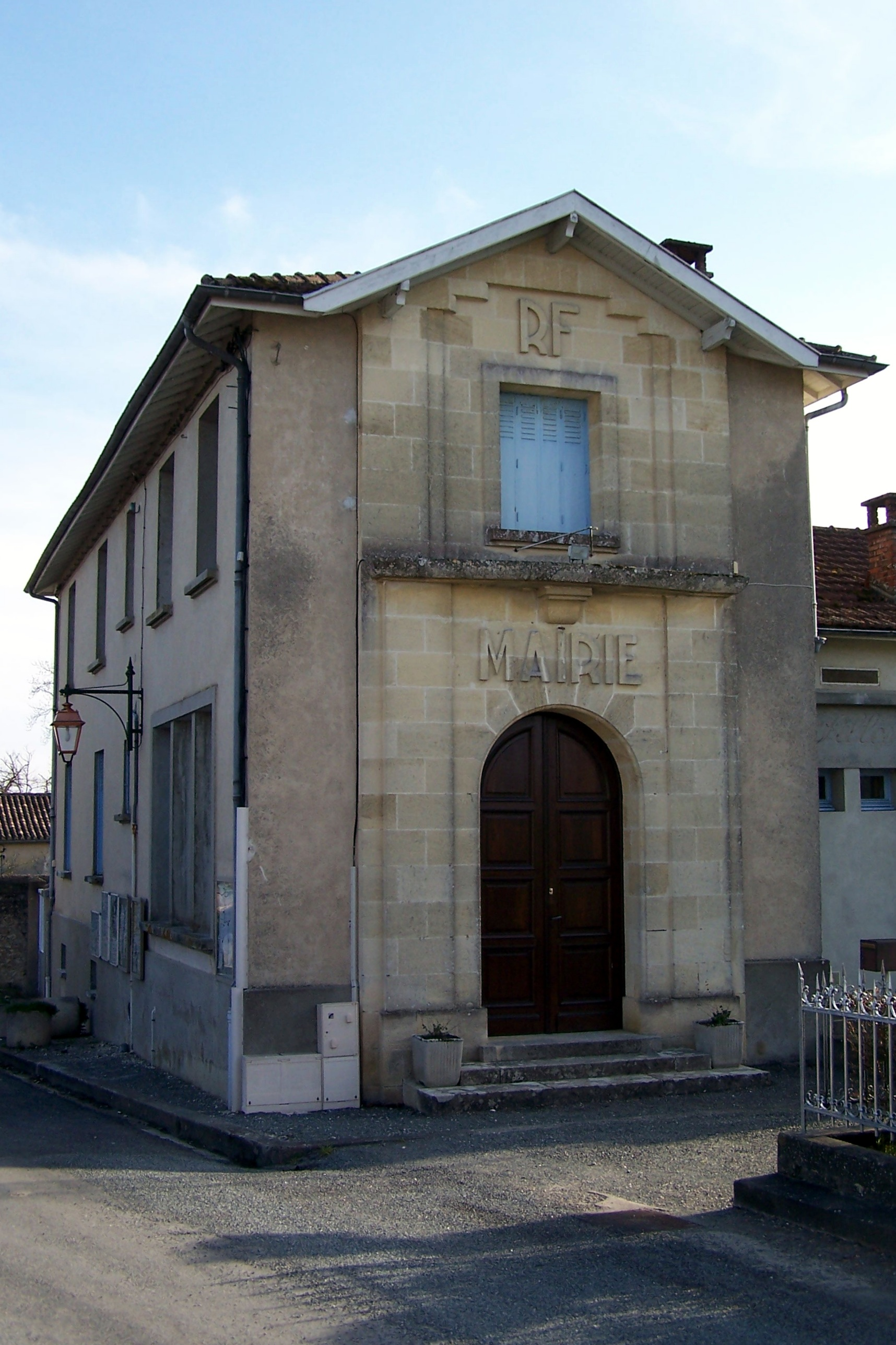
- Town hall
- Location of Dieulivol
- Location within France Location within Nouvelle-Aquitaine
- Coordinates: 44°40′29″N 0°06′41″E
- Country: France
- Region: Nouvelle-Aquitaine
- Department: Gironde
- Arrondissement: Langon
- Canton: Le Réolais et Les Bastides

Government
  - Mayor (2020–2026): Bernard Dalla-Longa
- Area^{1}: 10.47 km^{2} (4.04 sq mi)
- Elevation: 80 m (260 ft)
- Highest elevation: 111 m (364 ft)
- Lowest elevation: 22 m (72 ft)
- Population (2023): 334
  - Density: 31.9/km^{2} (82.6/sq mi)
- Time zone: UTC+01:00 (CET)
  - Summer (DST): UTC+02:00 (CEST)
- INSEE/Postal code: 33150 /33580
- ^{1} French Land Register data, which excludes lakes, ponds, glaciers > 1 km^{2} (0.386 sq mi or 247 acres) and river estuaries.

Dieulivol (French pronunciation: [djølivɔl]; Occitan: Diulivòl) is a commune in the Gironde department in southwestern France.

== Population ==
Historical population
Year	Pop.	±% p.a.
1968	332	—
1975	266	−3.12%
1982	232	−1.93%
1990	248	+0.84%
1999	263	+0.65%
2007	255	−0.39%
2012	328	+5.16%
2017	344	+0.96%
2023	334	−0.49%
Source: INSEE

== See also ==
- Communes of the Gironde department
