= Neuffons =

- Commune
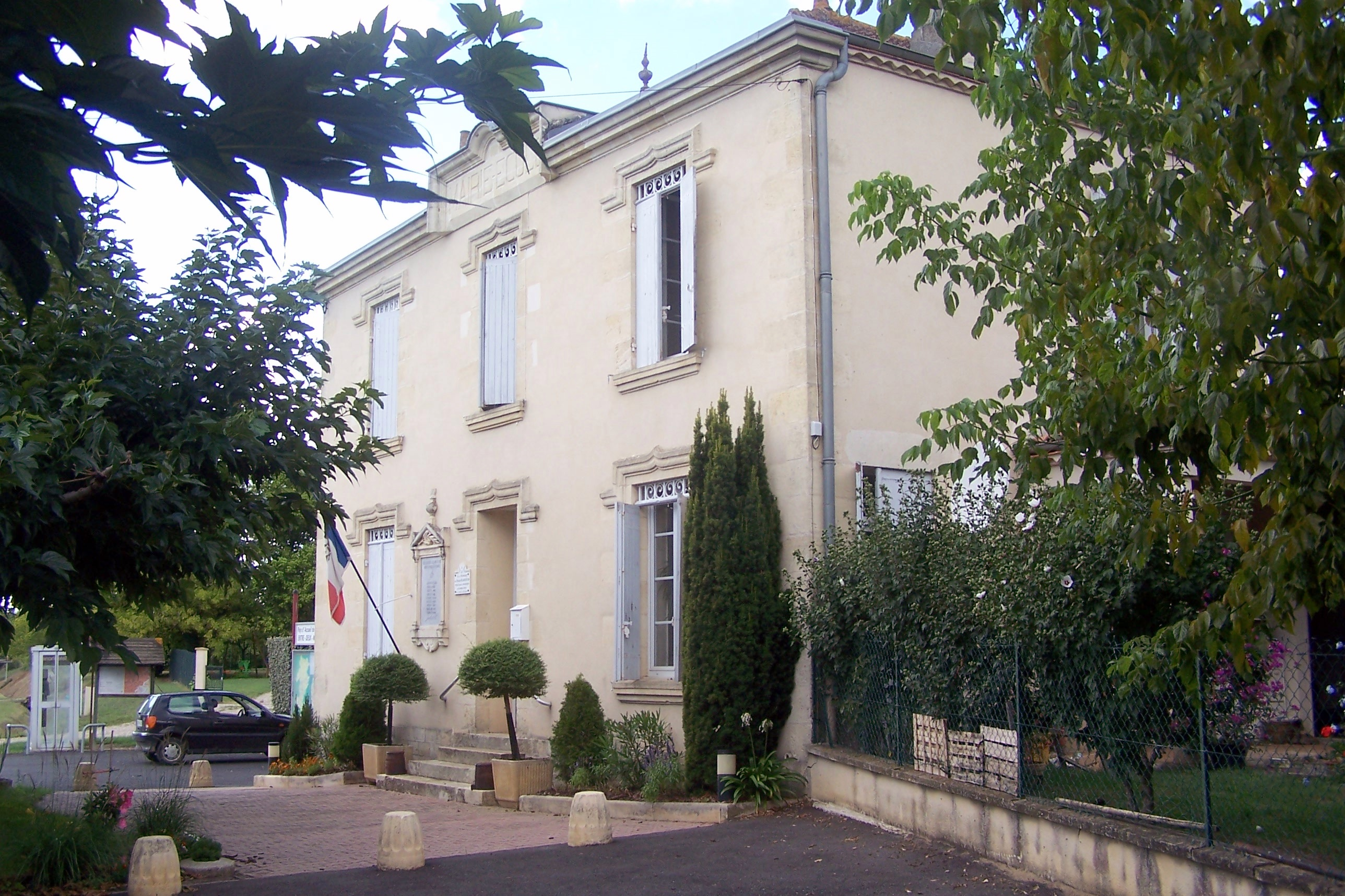
- Town hall
- Location of Neuffons
- Location within France Location within Nouvelle-Aquitaine
- Coordinates: 44°38′38″N 0°00′41″E
- Country: France
- Region: Nouvelle-Aquitaine
- Department: Gironde
- Arrondissement: Langon
- Canton: Le Réolais et Les Bastides

Government
  - Mayor (2020–2026): Thierry Laborde
- Area^{1}: 4.67 km^{2} (1.80 sq mi)
- Elevation: 23 m (75 ft)
- Highest elevation: 98 m (322 ft)
- Lowest elevation: 12 m (39 ft)
- Population (2023): 154
  - Density: 33.0/km^{2} (85.4/sq mi)
- Time zone: UTC+01:00 (CET)
  - Summer (DST): UTC+02:00 (CEST)
- INSEE/Postal code: 33304 /33580
- ^{1} French Land Register data, which excludes lakes, ponds, glaciers > 1 km^{2} (0.386 sq mi or 247 acres) and river estuaries.

Neuffons is a commune in the Gironde department in Nouvelle-Aquitaine in southwestern France.

== Population ==
Historical population
Year	Pop.	±% p.a.
1968	183	—
1975	152	−2.62%
1982	145	−0.67%
1990	118	−2.54%
1999	122	+0.37%
2007	164	+3.77%
2012	163	−0.12%
2017	150	−1.65%
2023	154	+0.44%
Source: INSEE

== See also ==
- Communes of the Gironde department
