= Civrac =

Civrac may refer to three communes in the Gironde department in southwestern France:

- Civrac-de-Blaye
- Civrac-en-Médoc
- Civrac-sur-Dordogne
