= Générac =

Générac is the name of 2 communes in France:

- Générac, in the Gard department
- Générac, in the Gironde department

== See also ==
- Generac, an American manufacturing company
