= Cézac =

Cézac is the name of the following communes in France:

- Cézac, Gironde, in the Gironde department
- Cézac, Lot, in the Lot department
