= Saint-Savin, Gironde =

Saint-Savin
- Commune
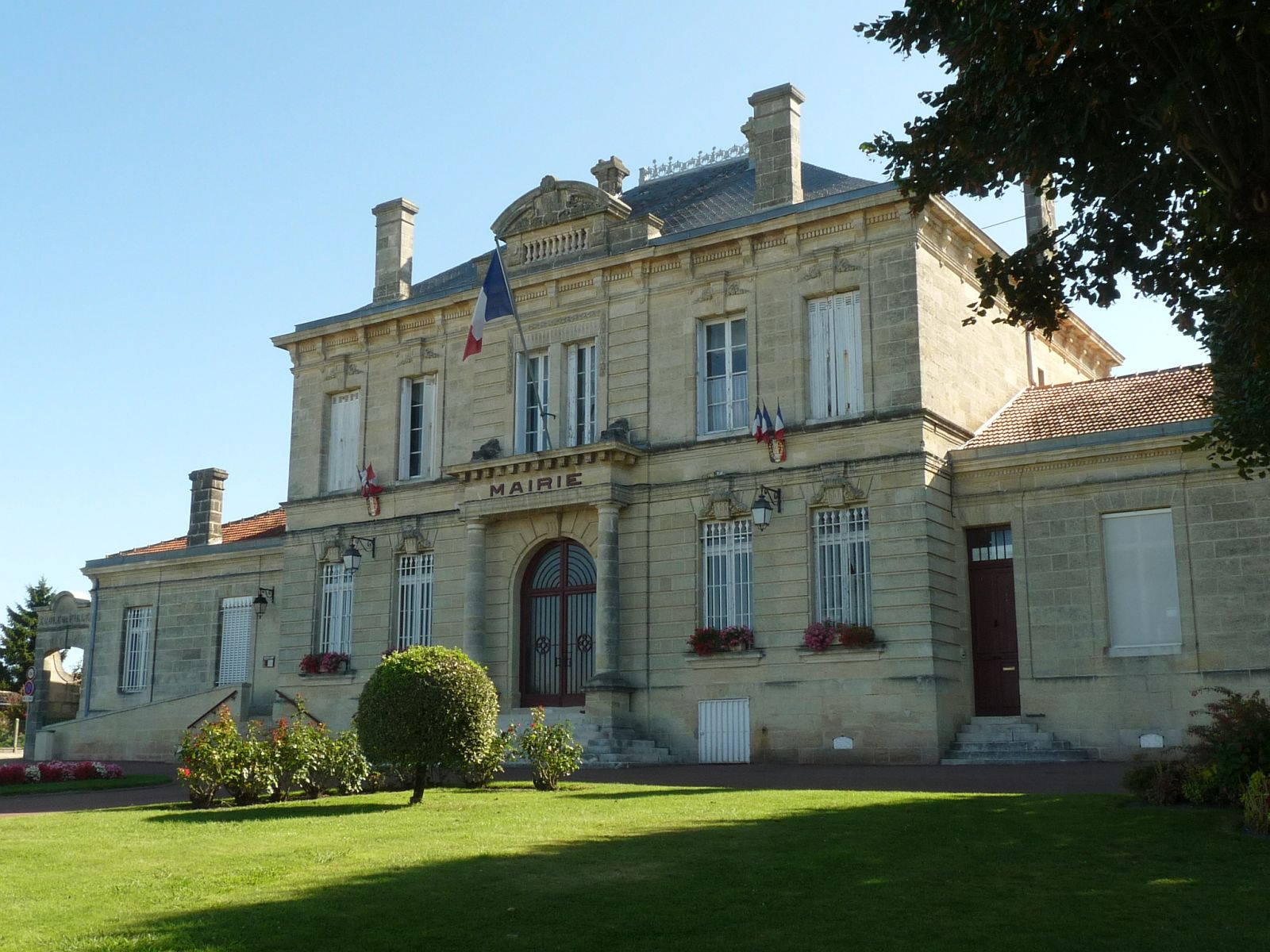
- The town hall in Saint-Savin

- Coat of arms
- Location of Saint-Savin
- Location within France Location within Nouvelle-Aquitaine
- Coordinates: 45°08′22″N 0°26′51″W
- Country: France
- Region: Nouvelle-Aquitaine
- Department: Gironde
- Arrondissement: Blaye
- Canton: Le Nord-Gironde
- Intercommunality: Latitude Nord Gironde

Government
  - Mayor (2020–2026): Alain Renard
- Area^{1}: 33.87 km^{2} (13.08 sq mi)
- Elevation: 95 m (312 ft)
- Highest elevation: 93 m (305 ft)
- Lowest elevation: 19 m (62 ft)
- Population (2023): 3,582
  - Density: 105.8/km^{2} (273.9/sq mi)
- Time zone: UTC+01:00 (CET)
  - Summer (DST): UTC+02:00 (CEST)
- INSEE/Postal code: 33473 /33920
- ^{1} French Land Register data, which excludes lakes, ponds, glaciers > 1 km^{2} (0.386 sq mi or 247 acres) and river estuaries.

Saint-Savin (French pronunciation: [sɛ̃ savɛ̃]) is a commune in the Gironde department in Nouvelle-Aquitaine in southwestern France.

== Population ==
Historical population

Year	Pop.	±% p.a.
1793	1,590	—
1800	1,850	+2.19%
1806	1,784	−0.60%
1821	2,059	+0.96%
1831	2,075	+0.08%
1836	1,982	−0.91%
1841	1,926	−0.57%
1846	2,046	+1.22%
1851	2,034	−0.12%
1856	2,019	−0.15%
1861	2,034	+0.15%
1866	2,145	+1.07%
1872	2,205	+0.46%
1876	2,126	−0.91%
1881	2,210	+0.78%
1886	2,186	−0.22%
1891	1,627	−5.74%
1896	1,769	+1.69%
1901	1,772	+0.03%

Year	Pop.	±% p.a.
1906	1,804	+0.36%
1911	1,722	−0.93%
1921	1,642	−0.47%
1926	1,639	−0.04%
1931	1,735	+1.14%
1936	1,645	−1.06%
1946	1,503	−0.90%
1954	1,655	+1.21%
1962	1,672	+0.13%
1968	1,640	−0.32%
1975	1,655	+0.13%
1982	1,757	+0.86%
1990	1,886	+0.89%
1999	2,077	+1.08%
2007	2,615	+2.92%
2012	2,978	+2.63%
2017	3,208	+1.50%
2023	3,582	+1.85%

Source: EHESS and INSEE (1968–2023)

== See also ==
- Communes of the Gironde department
