= Saint-Girons-d'Aiguevives =

- Commune
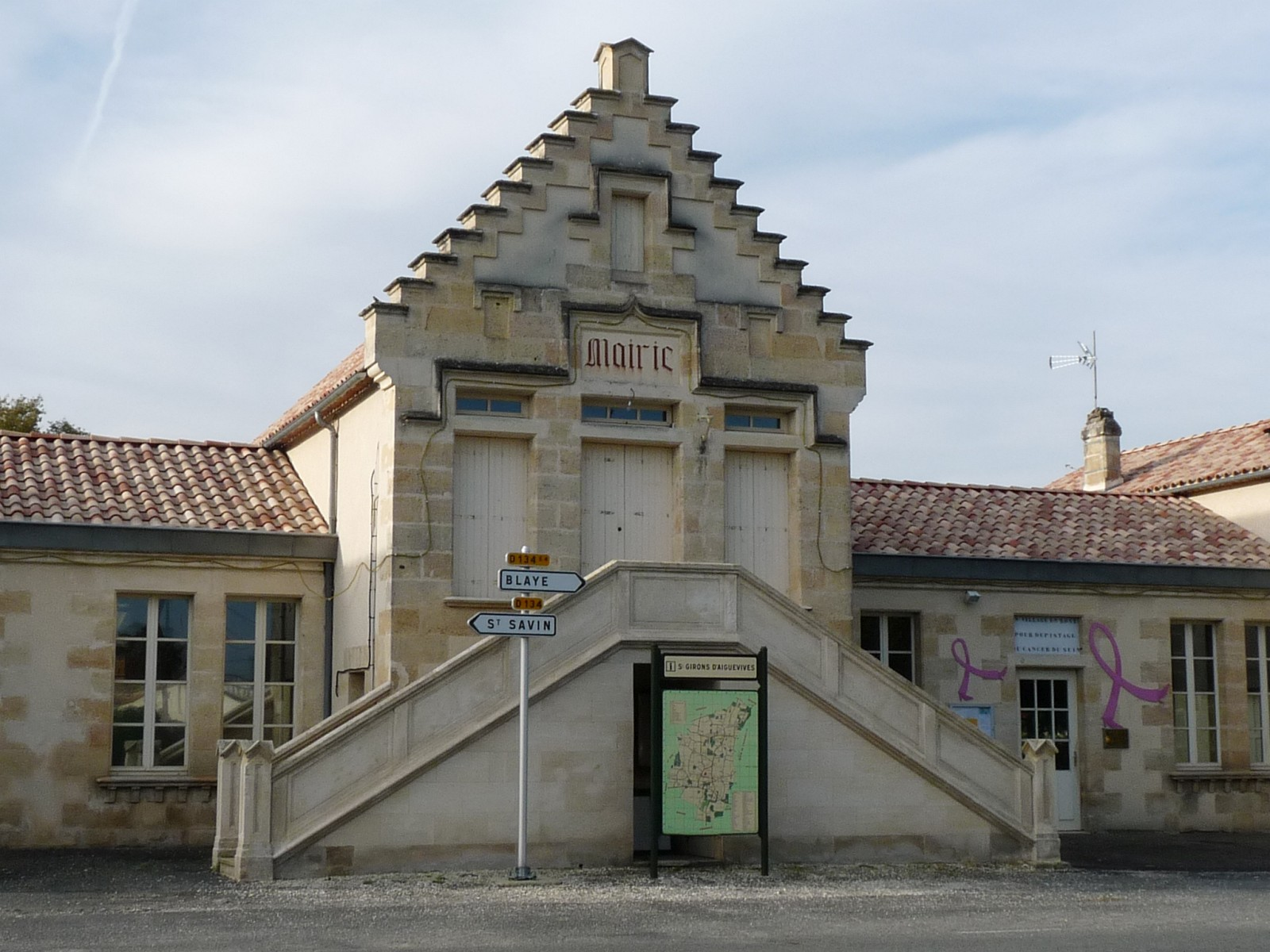
- The town hall in Saint-Girons-d'Aiguevives
- Location of Saint-Girons-d'Aiguevives
- Location within France Location within Nouvelle-Aquitaine
- Coordinates: 45°08′27″N 0°32′27″W
- Country: France
- Region: Nouvelle-Aquitaine
- Department: Gironde
- Arrondissement: Blaye
- Canton: Le Nord-Gironde

Government
  - Mayor (2020–2026): Eric Page
- Area^{1}: 11.94 km^{2} (4.61 sq mi)
- Elevation: 45 m (148 ft)
- Highest elevation: 81 m (266 ft)
- Lowest elevation: 24 m (79 ft)
- Population (2023): 971
  - Density: 81.3/km^{2} (211/sq mi)
- Time zone: UTC+01:00 (CET)
  - Summer (DST): UTC+02:00 (CEST)
- INSEE/Postal code: 33416 /33920
- ^{1} French Land Register data, which excludes lakes, ponds, glaciers > 1 km^{2} (0.386 sq mi or 247 acres) and river estuaries.

Saint-Girons-d'Aiguevives is a commune in the Gironde department in Nouvelle-Aquitaine in southwestern France.

== Population ==
Historical population
Year	Pop.	±% p.a.
1968	615	—
1975	564	−1.23%
1982	640	+1.82%
1990	658	+0.35%
1999	795	+2.12%
2007	926	+1.92%
2012	979	+1.12%
2017	950	−0.60%
2023	971	+0.37%
Source: INSEE

== See also ==
- Communes of the Gironde department
