= Canton of Le Nord-Gironde =

Coordinates: 44.99°N 0.45°W

The canton of Le Nord-Gironde is an administrative division of the Gironde department, southwestern France. It was created at the French canton reorganisation which came into effect in March 2015. Its seat is in Saint-André-de-Cubzac.

It consists of the following communes:

1. Cavignac
2. Cézac
3. Civrac-de-Blaye
4. Cubnezais
5. Cubzac-les-Ponts
6. Donnezac
7. Gauriaguet
8. Générac
9. Laruscade
10. Marcenais
11. Marsas
12. Périssac
13. Peujard
14. Saint-André-de-Cubzac
15. Saint-Christoly-de-Blaye
16. Saint-Genès-de-Fronsac
17. Saint-Gervais
18. Saint-Girons-d'Aiguevives
19. Saint-Laurent-d'Arce
20. Saint-Mariens
21. Saint-Savin
22. Saint-Vivien-de-Blaye
23. Saint-Yzan-de-Soudiac
24. Saugon
25. Val-de-Virvée
26. Virsac
