= Gauriac =

- Commune
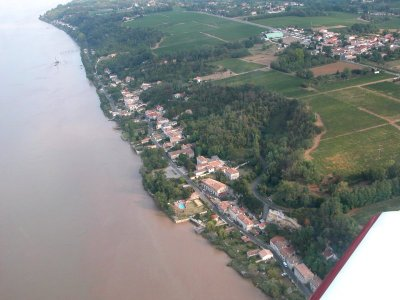
- An aerial view of Gauriac
- Location of Gauriac
- Location within France Location within Nouvelle-Aquitaine
- Coordinates: 45°03′55″N 0°36′58″W
- Country: France
- Region: Nouvelle-Aquitaine
- Department: Gironde
- Arrondissement: Blaye
- Canton: L'Estuaire

Government
  - Mayor (2020–2026): Raymond Rodriguez
- Area^{1}: 5.54 km^{2} (2.14 sq mi)
- Elevation: 45 m (148 ft)
- Highest elevation: 66 m (217 ft)
- Lowest elevation: 0 m (0 ft)
- Population (2023): 759
  - Density: 137/km^{2} (355/sq mi)
- Time zone: UTC+01:00 (CET)
  - Summer (DST): UTC+02:00 (CEST)
- INSEE/Postal code: 33182 /33710
- ^{1} French Land Register data, which excludes lakes, ponds, glaciers > 1 km^{2} (0.386 sq mi or 247 acres) and river estuaries.

Gauriac (French pronunciation: [ɡɔʁjak]) is a commune in the Gironde department in southwestern France.

== Population ==
Historical population
Year	Pop.	±% p.a.
1968	927	—
1975	838	−1.43%
1982	857	+0.32%
1990	809	−0.72%
1999	826	+0.23%
2007	842	+0.24%
2012	811	−0.75%
2017	748	−1.60%
2023	759	+0.24%
Source: INSEE

== See also ==
- Communes of the Gironde department
