= Pugnac =

- Commune
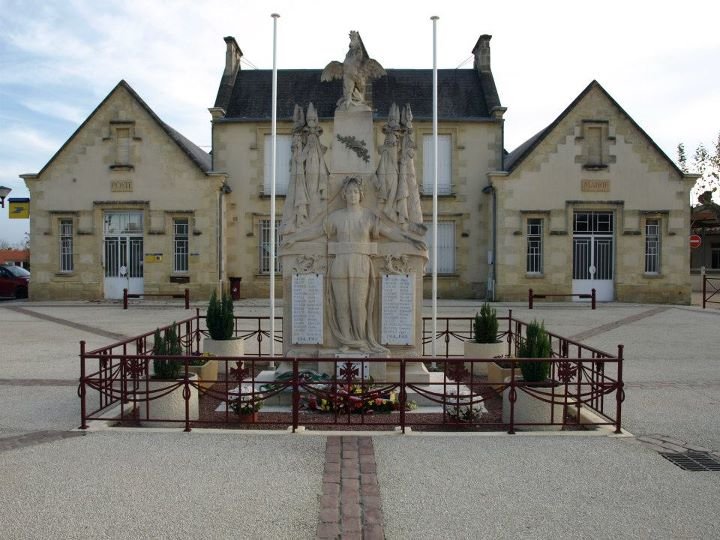
- War memorial and town hall

- Coat of arms
- Location of Pugnac
- Location within France Location within Nouvelle-Aquitaine
- Coordinates: 45°04′56″N 0°29′42″W
- Country: France
- Region: Nouvelle-Aquitaine
- Department: Gironde
- Arrondissement: Blaye
- Canton: L'Estuaire
- Intercommunality: Grand Cubzaguais

Government
  - Mayor (2020–2026): Jean Roux
- Area^{1}: 13.53 km^{2} (5.22 sq mi)
- Elevation: 50 m (160 ft)
- Highest elevation: 52 m (171 ft)
- Lowest elevation: 3 m (9.8 ft)
- Population (2023): 2,453
  - Density: 181.3/km^{2} (469.6/sq mi)
- Time zone: UTC+01:00 (CET)
  - Summer (DST): UTC+02:00 (CEST)
- INSEE/Postal code: 33341 /33710
- ^{1} French Land Register data, which excludes lakes, ponds, glaciers > 1 km^{2} (0.386 sq mi or 247 acres) and river estuaries.

Pugnac (French pronunciation: [pyɲak]) is a commune in the Gironde department in Nouvelle-Aquitaine in southwestern France.

== Population ==
Historical population
Year	Pop.	±% p.a.
1968	1,039	—
1975	1,120	+1.08%
1982	1,610	+5.32%
1990	1,875	+1.92%
1999	1,893	+0.11%
2007	1,964	+0.46%
2012	2,172	+2.03%
2017	2,288	+1.05%
2023	2,453	+1.17%
Source: INSEE

== See also ==
- Communes of the Gironde department
