= Marsas, Gironde =

Marsas
- Commune
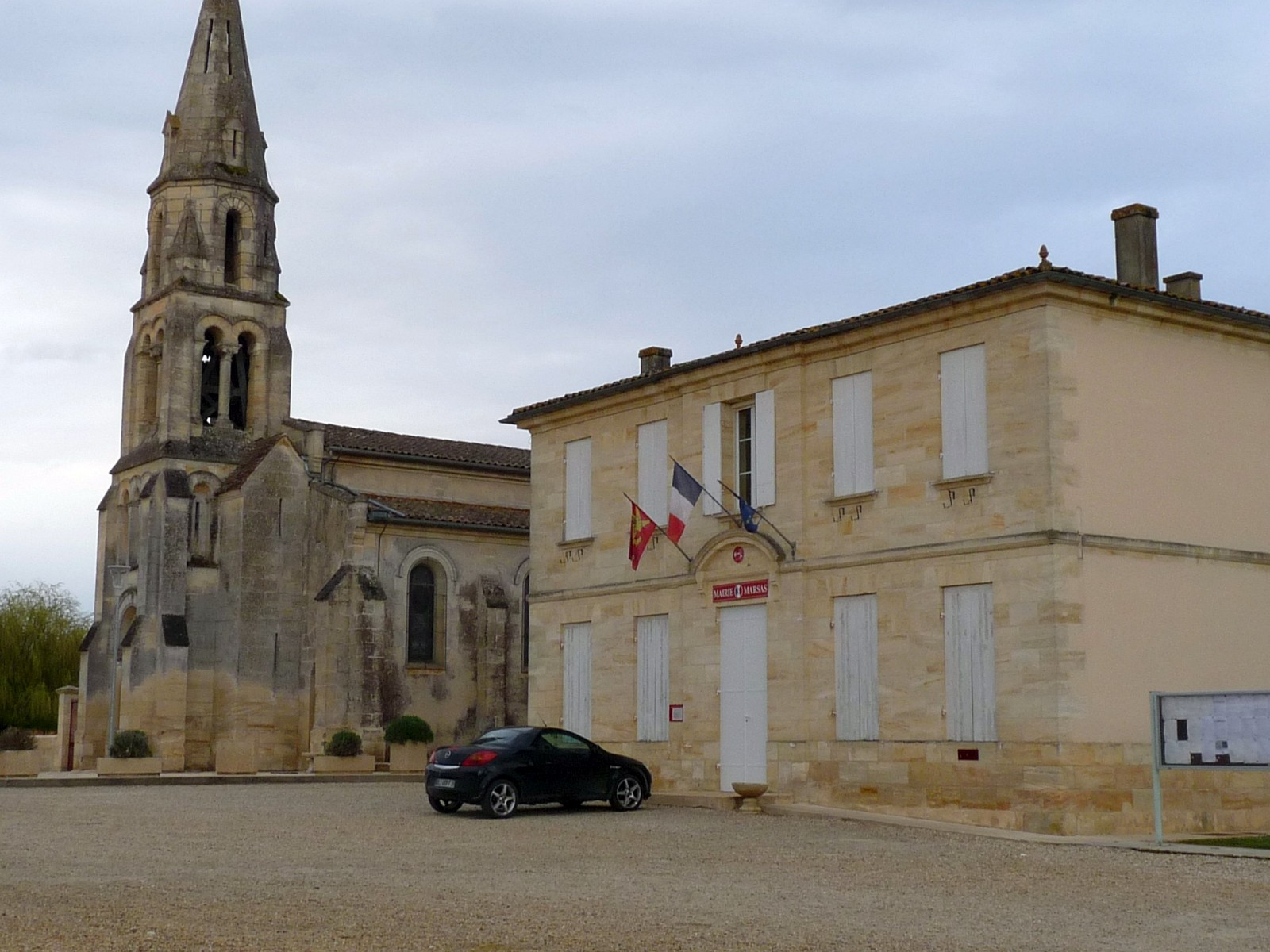
- The church and town hall in Marsas
- Location of Marsas
- Location within France Location within Nouvelle-Aquitaine
- Coordinates: 45°04′06″N 0°22′53″W
- Country: France
- Region: Nouvelle-Aquitaine
- Department: Gironde
- Arrondissement: Blaye
- Canton: Le Nord-Gironde
- Intercommunality: Latitude Nord Gironde

Government
  - Mayor (2020–2026): Brigitte Misiak
- Area^{1}: 8.13 km^{2} (3.14 sq mi)
- Elevation: 65 m (213 ft)
- Highest elevation: 71 m (233 ft)
- Lowest elevation: 27 m (89 ft)
- Population (2023): 1,247
  - Density: 153/km^{2} (397/sq mi)
- Time zone: UTC+01:00 (CET)
  - Summer (DST): UTC+02:00 (CEST)
- INSEE/Postal code: 33272 /33620
- ^{1} French Land Register data, which excludes lakes, ponds, glaciers > 1 km^{2} (0.386 sq mi or 247 acres) and river estuaries.

Marsas (French pronunciation: [maʁsas]) is a commune in the Gironde department in Nouvelle-Aquitaine in southwestern France.

== Population ==
Historical population
Year	Pop.	±% p.a.
1968	568	—
1975	522	−1.20%
1982	724	+4.78%
1990	806	+1.35%
1999	864	+0.78%
2007	1,056	+2.54%
2012	1,134	+1.44%
2017	1,204	+1.21%
2023	1,247	+0.59%
Source: INSEE

== See also ==
- Communes of the Gironde department
