= Cubnezais =

- Commune
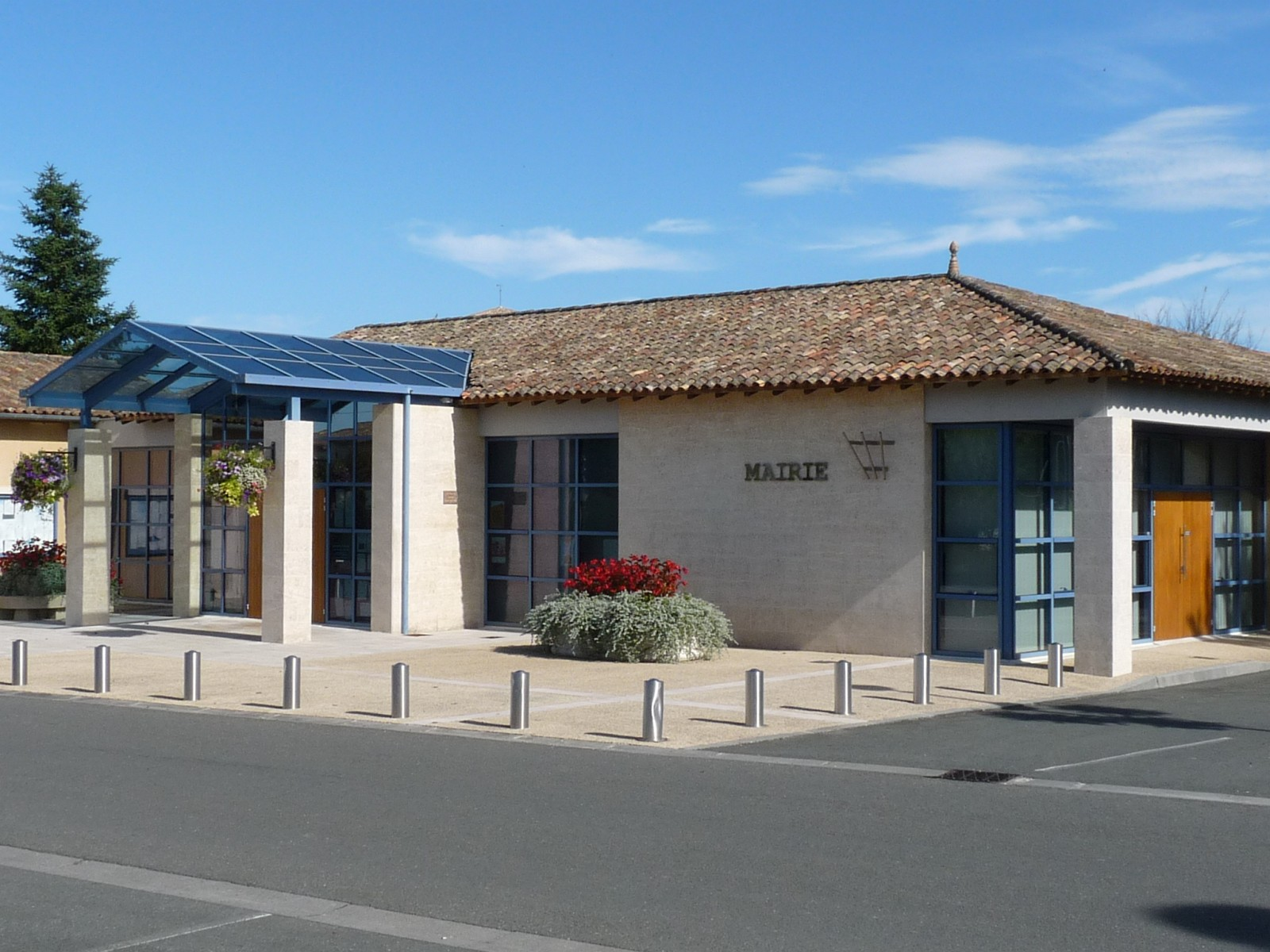
- The town hall in Cubnezais
- Location of Cubnezais
- Location within France Location within Nouvelle-Aquitaine
- Coordinates: 45°04′32″N 0°24′24″W
- Country: France
- Region: Nouvelle-Aquitaine
- Department: Gironde
- Arrondissement: Blaye
- Canton: Le Nord-Gironde
- Intercommunality: Latitude Nord Gironde

Government
  - Mayor (2020–2026): Jean-Luc Desperiez
- Area^{1}: 10.3 km^{2} (4.0 sq mi)
- Elevation: 45 m (148 ft)
- Highest elevation: 61 m (200 ft)
- Lowest elevation: 11 m (36 ft)
- Population (2023): 1,915
  - Density: 186/km^{2} (482/sq mi)
- Time zone: UTC+01:00 (CET)
  - Summer (DST): UTC+02:00 (CEST)
- INSEE/Postal code: 33142 /33620
- ^{1} French Land Register data, which excludes lakes, ponds, glaciers > 1 km^{2} (0.386 sq mi or 247 acres) and river estuaries.

Cubnezais (French pronunciation: [kybnəzɛ]) is a commune in the Gironde department in Nouvelle-Aquitaine in southwestern France.

== Population ==
Historical population
Year	Pop.	±% p.a.
1968	481	—
1975	531	+1.42%
1982	832	+6.63%
1990	1,045	+2.89%
1999	1,049	+0.04%
2007	1,154	+1.20%
2012	1,374	+3.55%
2017	1,499	+1.76%
2023	1,915	+4.17%
Source: INSEE

== See also ==
- Communes of the Gironde department
