= Communes of the Gironde department =

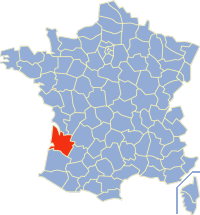

The following is a list of the 534 communes of the Gironde department of France.

The communes cooperate in the following intercommunalities (as of 2025):

- Bordeaux Métropole
- Communauté d'agglomération du Bassin d'Arcachon Nord
- Communauté d'agglomération Bassin d'Arcachon Sud
- Communauté d'agglomération du Libournais
- Communauté de communes du Bazadais
- Communauté de communes de Blaye
- Communauté de communes Castillon-Pujols (partly)
- Communauté de communes Convergence Garonne
- Communauté de communes des Coteaux Bordelais
- Communauté de communes du Créonnais
- Communauté de communes de l'Estuaire
- Communauté de communes du Fronsadais
- Communauté de communes du Grand Cubzaguais
- Communauté de communes du Grand Saint-Émilionnais
- Communauté de communes Jalle Eau Bourde
- Communauté de communes Latitude Nord Gironde
- Communauté de communes Médoc Atlantique
- Communauté de communes Médoc Cœur de Presqu'île
- Communauté de communes Médoc Estuaire
- Communauté de communes Médullienne
- Communauté de communes de Montesquieu
- Communauté de communes du Pays Foyen (partly)
- Communauté de communes des Portes de l'Entre-Deux-Mers
- Communauté de communes du Réolais en Sud Gironde
- Communauté de communes Les Rives de la Laurence
- Communauté de communes rurales de l'Entre-Deux-Mers
- Communauté de communes du Sud Gironde
- Communauté de communes du Val de l'Eyre

| INSEE code | Postal code | Commune |
|---|---|---|
| 33001 | 33230 | Abzac |
| 33002 | 33124 | Aillas |
| 33003 | 33440 | Ambarès-et-Lagrave |
| 33004 | 33810 | Ambès |
| 33005 | 33510 | Andernos-les-Bains |
| 33006 | 33390 | Anglade |
| 33007 | 33640 | Arbanats |
| 33009 | 33120 | Arcachon |
| 33010 | 33460 | Arcins |
| 33011 | 33740 | Arès |
| 33012 | 33460 | Arsac |
| 33014 | 33570 | Les Artigues-de-Lussac |
| 33013 | 33370 | Artigues-près-Bordeaux |
| 33015 | 33500 | Arveyres |
| 33016 | 33240 | Asques |
| 33017 | 33430 | Aubiac |
| 33019 | 33980 | Audenge |
| 33020 | 33790 | Auriolles |
| 33021 | 33124 | Auros |
| 33022 | 33480 | Avensan |
| 33023 | 33640 | Ayguemorte-les-Graves |
| 33024 | 33190 | Bagas |
| 33025 | 33760 | Baigneaux |
| 33026 | 33730 | Balizac |
| 33027 | 33190 | Barie |
| 33028 | 33750 | Baron |
| 33029 | 33114 | Le Barp |
| 33030 | 33720 | Barsac |
| 33031 | 33190 | Bassanne |
| 33032 | 33530 | Bassens |
| 33033 | 33880 | Baurech |
| 33034 | 33230 | Bayas |
| 33035 | 33710 | Bayon-sur-Gironde |
| 33036 | 33430 | Bazas |
| 33037 | 33640 | Beautiran |
| 33038 | 33340 | Bégadan |
| 33039 | 33130 | Bègles |
| 33040 | 33410 | Béguey |
| 33042 | 33830 | Belin-Béliet |
| 33043 | 33760 | Bellebat |
| 33044 | 33760 | Bellefond |
| 33045 | 33350 | Belvès-de-Castillon |
| 33046 | 33430 | Bernos-Beaulac |
| 33047 | 33390 | Berson |
| 33048 | 33124 | Berthez |
| 33049 | 33750 | Beychac-et-Caillau |
| 33050 | 33210 | Bieujac |
| 33051 | 33380 | Biganos |
| 33052 | 33500 | Les Billaux |
| 33053 | 33430 | Birac |
| 33054 | 33190 | Blaignac |
| 33055 | 33340 | Blaignan-Prignac |
| 33056 | 33290 | Blanquefort |
| 33057 | 33540 | Blasimon |
| 33058 | 33390 | Blaye |
| 33059 | 33670 | Blésignac |
| 33060 | 33210 | Bommes |
| 33061 | 33370 | Bonnetan |
| 33062 | 33910 | Bonzac |
| 33063 | 33000 | Bordeaux |
| 33064 | 33350 | Bossugan |
| 33065 | 33270 | Bouliac |
| 33066 | 33190 | Bourdelles |
| 33067 | 33710 | Bourg |
| 33068 | 33113 | Bourideys |
| 33069 | 33110 | Le Bouscat |
| 33070 | 33480 | Brach |
| 33071 | 33420 | Branne |
| 33072 | 33124 | Brannens |
| 33073 | 33820 | Braud-et-Saint-Louis |
| 33213 | 33650 | La Brède |
| 33074 | 33124 | Brouqueyran |
| 33075 | 33520 | Bruges |
| 33076 | 33720 | Budos |
| 33077 | 33650 | Cabanac-et-Villagrains |
| 33078 | 33420 | Cabara |
| 33079 | 33750 | Cadarsac |
| 33080 | 33140 | Cadaujac |
| 33081 | 33410 | Cadillac-sur-Garonne |
| 33082 | 33240 | Cadillac-en-Fronsadais |
| 33083 | 33750 | Camarsac |
| 33084 | 33880 | Cambes |
| 33085 | 33360 | Camblanes-et-Meynac |
| 33086 | 33420 | Camiac-et-Saint-Denis |
| 33087 | 33190 | Camiran |
| 33088 | 33660 | Camps-sur-l'Isle |
| 33089 | 33390 | Campugnan |
| 33090 | 33610 | Canéjan |
| 33093 | 33550 | Capian |
| 33094 | 33220 | Caplong |
| 33095 | 33840 | Captieux |
| 33096 | 33560 | Carbon-Blanc |
| 33097 | 33121 | Carcans |
| 33098 | 33410 | Cardan |
| 33099 | 33360 | Carignan-de-Bordeaux |
| 33100 | 33390 | Cars |
| 33101 | 33390 | Cartelègue |
| 33102 | 33190 | Casseuil |
| 33103 | 33540 | Castelmoron-d'Albret |
| 33104 | 33480 | Castelnau-de-Médoc |
| 33105 | 33540 | Castelviel |
| 33106 | 33210 | Castets et Castillon |
| 33108 | 33350 | Castillon-la-Bataille |
| 33109 | 33640 | Castres-Gironde |
| 33111 | 33490 | Caudrot |
| 33112 | 33540 | Caumont |
| 33113 | 33690 | Cauvignac |
| 33114 | 33620 | Cavignac |
| 33115 | 33113 | Cazalis |
| 33116 | 33430 | Cazats |
| 33117 | 33790 | Cazaugitat |
| 33118 | 33360 | Cénac |
| 33119 | 33150 | Cenon |
| 33120 | 33720 | Cérons |
| 33121 | 33760 | Cessac |
| 33122 | 33610 | Cestas |
| 33123 | 33620 | Cézac |
| 33124 | 33230 | Chamadelle |
| 33125 | 33250 | Cissac-Médoc |
| 33126 | 33920 | Civrac-de-Blaye |
| 33128 | 33340 | Civrac-en-Médoc |
| 33127 | 33350 | Civrac-sur-Dordogne |
| 33129 | 33540 | Cleyrac |
| 33130 | 33210 | Coimères |
| 33131 | 33540 | Coirac |
| 33132 | 33710 | Comps |
| 33133 | 33890 | Coubeyrac |
| 33134 | 33340 | Couquèques |
| 33135 | 33760 | Courpiac |
| 33136 | 33580 | Cours-de-Monségur |
| 33137 | 33690 | Cours-les-Bains |
| 33138 | 33230 | Coutras |
| 33139 | 33580 | Coutures |
| 33140 | 33670 | Créon |
| 33141 | 33750 | Croignon |
| 33142 | 33620 | Cubnezais |
| 33143 | 33240 | Cubzac-les-Ponts |
| 33144 | 33430 | Cudos |
| 33145 | 33670 | Cursan |
| 33146 | 33460 | Cussac-Fort-Médoc |
| 33147 | 33420 | Daignac |
| 33148 | 33420 | Dardenac |
| 33149 | 33540 | Daubèze |
| 33150 | 33580 | Dieulivol |
| 33151 | 33860 | Donnezac |
| 33152 | 33410 | Donzac |
| 33153 | 33350 | Doulezon |
| 33154 | 33230 | Les Églisottes-et-Chalaures |
| 33155 | 33840 | Escaudes |
| 33156 | 33760 | Escoussans |
| 33157 | 33420 | Espiet |
| 33158 | 33190 | Les Esseintes |
| 33159 | 33820 | Étauliers |
| 33160 | 33220 | Eynesse |
| 33161 | 33390 | Eyrans |
| 33162 | 33320 | Eysines |
| 33163 | 33760 | Faleyras |
| 33164 | 33210 | Fargues |
| 33165 | 33370 | Fargues-Saint-Hilaire |
| 33166 | 33230 | Le Fieu |
| 33168 | 33350 | Flaujagues |
| 33167 | 33270 | Floirac |
| 33169 | 33190 | Floudès |
| 33170 | 33190 | Fontet |
| 33171 | 33190 | Fossès-et-Baleyssac |
| 33172 | 33390 | Fours |
| 33173 | 33570 | Francs |
| 33174 | 33126 | Fronsac |
| 33175 | 33760 | Frontenac |
| 33176 | 33410 | Gabarnac |
| 33177 | 33340 | Gaillan-en-Médoc |
| 33178 | 33430 | Gajac |
| 33179 | 33133 | Galgon |
| 33180 | 33430 | Gans |
| 33181 | 33350 | Gardegan-et-Tourtirac |
| 33182 | 33710 | Gauriac |
| 33183 | 33240 | Gauriaguet |
| 33184 | 33920 | Générac |
| 33185 | 33420 | Génissac |
| 33186 | 33890 | Gensac |
| 33187 | 33190 | Gironde-sur-Dropt |
| 33188 | 33840 | Giscos |
| 33189 | 33540 | Gornac |
| 33190 | 33840 | Goualade |
| 33191 | 33660 | Gours |
| 33192 | 33170 | Gradignan |
| 33193 | 33590 | Grayan-et-l'Hôpital |
| 33194 | 33420 | Grézillac |
| 33195 | 33690 | Grignols |
| 33196 | 33420 | Guillac |
| 33197 | 33720 | Guillos |
| 33198 | 33230 | Guîtres |
| 33199 | 33470 | Gujan-Mestras |
| 33200 | 33185 | Le Haillan |
| 33201 | 33550 | Haux |
| 33202 | 33125 | Hostens |
| 33203 | 33990 | Hourtin |
| 33204 | 33190 | Hure |
| 33205 | 33720 | Illats |
| 33206 | 33640 | Isle-Saint-Georges |
| 33207 | 33450 | Izon |
| 33208 | 33590 | Jau-Dignac-et-Loirac |
| 33209 | 33420 | Jugazan |
| 33210 | 33890 | Juillac |
| 33211 | 33460 | Labarde |
| 33212 | 33690 | Labescau |
| 33214 | 33680 | Lacanau |
| 33215 | 33760 | Ladaux |
| 33216 | 33124 | Lados |
| 33218 | 33230 | Lagorce |
| 33222 | 33500 | Lalande-de-Pomerol |
| 33220 | 33460 | Lamarque |
| 33221 | 33190 | Lamothe-Landerron |
| 33219 | 33240 | La Lande-de-Fronsac |
| 33223 | 33790 | Landerrouat |
| 33224 | 33540 | Landerrouet-sur-Ségur |
| 33225 | 33720 | Landiras |
| 33226 | 33550 | Langoiran |
| 33227 | 33210 | Langon |
| 33228 | 33710 | Lansac |
| 33229 | 33148 | Lanton |
| 33230 | 33620 | Lapouyade |
| 33231 | 33410 | Laroque |
| 33232 | 33840 | Lartigue |
| 33233 | 33620 | Laruscade |
| 33234 | 33360 | Latresne |
| 33235 | 33690 | Lavazan |
| 33236 | 33950 | Lège-Cap-Ferret |
| 33237 | 33210 | Léogeats |
| 33238 | 33850 | Léognan |
| 33239 | 33840 | Lerm-et-Musset |
| 33240 | 33340 | Lesparre-Médoc |
| 33241 | 33550 | Lestiac-sur-Garonne |
| 33242 | 33220 | Les Lèves-et-Thoumeyragues |
| 33243 | 33500 | Libourne |
| 33244 | 33430 | Lignan-de-Bazas |
| 33245 | 33360 | Lignan-de-Bordeaux |
| 33246 | 33220 | Ligueux |
| 33247 | 33790 | Listrac-de-Durèze |
| 33248 | 33480 | Listrac-Médoc |
| 33249 | 33310 | Lormont |
| 33250 | 33190 | Loubens |
| 33251 | 33125 | Louchats |
| 33252 | 33370 | Loupes |
| 33253 | 33410 | Loupiac |
| 33254 | 33190 | Loupiac-de-la-Réole |
| 33255 | 33840 | Lucmau |
| 33256 | 33290 | Ludon-Médoc |
| 33257 | 33420 | Lugaignac |
| 33258 | 33760 | Lugasson |
| 33259 | 33240 | Lugon-et-l'Île-du-Carnay |
| 33260 | 33830 | Lugos |
| 33261 | 33570 | Lussac |
| 33262 | 33460 | Macau |
| 33263 | 33670 | Madirac |
| 33264 | 33230 | Maransin |
| 33266 | 33620 | Marcenais |
| 33555 | 33380 | Marcheprime |
| 33268 | 33460 | Margaux-Cantenac |
| 33269 | 33220 | Margueron |
| 33270 | 33430 | Marimbault |
| 33271 | 33690 | Marions |
| 33272 | 33620 | Marsas |
| 33273 | 33127 | Martignas-sur-Jalle |
| 33274 | 33650 | Martillac |

| INSEE code | Postal code | Commune |
|---|---|---|
| 33275 | 33760 | Martres |
| 33276 | 33690 | Masseilles |
| 33277 | 33790 | Massugas |
| 33278 | 33540 | Mauriac |
| 33279 | 33210 | Mazères |
| 33280 | 33390 | Mazion |
| 33281 | 33700 | Mérignac |
| 33282 | 33350 | Mérignas |
| 33283 | 33540 | Mesterrieux |
| 33284 | 33380 | Mios |
| 33285 | 33710 | Mombrier |
| 33287 | 33190 | Mongauzy |
| 33288 | 33410 | Monprimblanc |
| 33289 | 33580 | Monségur |
| 33290 | 33570 | Montagne |
| 33291 | 33190 | Montagoudin |
| 33292 | 33760 | Montignac |
| 33293 | 33450 | Montussan |
| 33294 | 33190 | Morizès |
| 33295 | 33240 | Mouillac |
| 33296 | 33350 | Mouliets-et-Villemartin |
| 33297 | 33480 | Moulis-en-Médoc |
| 33298 | 33420 | Moulon |
| 33299 | 33410 | Mourens |
| 33300 | 33990 | Naujac-sur-Mer |
| 33301 | 33420 | Naujan-et-Postiac |
| 33302 | 33500 | Néac |
| 33303 | 33750 | Nérigean |
| 33304 | 33580 | Neuffons |
| 33305 | 33430 | Le Nizan |
| 33306 | 33190 | Noaillac |
| 33307 | 33730 | Noaillan |
| 33308 | 33410 | Omet |
| 33309 | 33340 | Ordonnac |
| 33310 | 33113 | Origne |
| 33311 | 33550 | Paillet |
| 33312 | 33290 | Parempuyre |
| 33314 | 33250 | Pauillac |
| 33315 | 33230 | Les Peintures |
| 33316 | 33790 | Pellegrue |
| 33317 | 33240 | Périssac |
| 33318 | 33600 | Pessac |
| 33319 | 33890 | Pessac-sur-Dordogne |
| 33320 | 33570 | Petit-Palais-et-Cornemps |
| 33321 | 33240 | Peujard |
| 33322 | 33290 | Le Pian-Médoc |
| 33323 | 33490 | Le Pian-sur-Garonne |
| 33324 | 33220 | Pineuilh |
| 33325 | 33390 | Plassac |
| 33326 | 33820 | Pleine-Selve |
| 33327 | 33720 | Podensac |
| 33328 | 33500 | Pomerol |
| 33329 | 33730 | Pompéjac |
| 33330 | 33370 | Pompignac |
| 33331 | 33190 | Pondaurat |
| 33332 | 33660 | Porchères |
| 33333 | 33680 | Le Porge |
| 33008 | 33760 | Porte-de-Benauge |
| 33334 | 33640 | Portets |
| 33335 | 33670 | Le Pout |
| 33336 | 33730 | Préchac |
| 33337 | 33210 | Preignac |
| 33339 | 33710 | Prignac-et-Marcamps |
| 33341 | 33710 | Pugnac |
| 33342 | 33570 | Puisseguin |
| 33344 | 33350 | Pujols |
| 33343 | 33210 | Pujols-sur-Ciron |
| 33345 | 33580 | Le Puy |
| 33346 | 33190 | Puybarban |
| 33347 | 33660 | Puynormand |
| 33348 | 33340 | Queyrac |
| 33349 | 33360 | Quinsac |
| 33350 | 33420 | Rauzan |
| 33351 | 33860 | Reignac |
| 33352 | 33190 | La Réole |
| 33353 | 33580 | Rimons |
| 33354 | 33220 | Riocaud |
| 33355 | 33410 | Rions |
| 33356 | 33126 | La Rivière |
| 33357 | 33210 | Roaillan |
| 33358 | 33760 | Romagne |
| 33359 | 33580 | Roquebrune |
| 33360 | 33220 | La Roquille |
| 33361 | 33350 | Ruch |
| 33362 | 33910 | Sablons |
| 33363 | 33670 | Sadirac |
| 33364 | 33141 | Saillans |
| 33365 | 33126 | Saint-Aignan |
| 33366 | 33240 | Saint-André-de-Cubzac |
| 33367 | 33490 | Saint-André-du-Bois |
| 33369 | 33220 | Saint-André-et-Appelles |
| 33370 | 33390 | Saint-Androny |
| 33372 | 33790 | Saint-Antoine-du-Queyret |
| 33373 | 33660 | Saint-Antoine-sur-l'Isle |
| 33374 | 33820 | Saint-Aubin-de-Blaye |
| 33375 | 33420 | Saint-Aubin-de-Branne |
| 33376 | 33160 | Saint-Aubin-de-Médoc |
| 33377 | 33220 | Saint-Avit-de-Soulège |
| 33378 | 33220 | Saint-Avit-Saint-Nazaire |
| 33379 | 33540 | Saint-Brice |
| 33381 | 33880 | Saint-Caprais-de-Bordeaux |
| 33382 | 33920 | Saint-Christoly-de-Blaye |
| 33383 | 33340 | Saint-Christoly-Médoc |
| 33385 | 33230 | Saint-Christophe-de-Double |
| 33384 | 33330 | Saint-Christophe-des-Bardes |
| 33386 | 33570 | Saint-Cibard |
| 33387 | 33910 | Saint-Ciers-d'Abzac |
| 33388 | 33710 | Saint-Ciers-de-Canesse |
| 33389 | 33820 | Saint-Ciers-sur-Gironde |
| 33391 | 33430 | Saint-Côme |
| 33393 | 33910 | Saint-Denis-de-Pile |
| 33390 | 33350 | Sainte-Colombe |
| 33392 | 33410 | Sainte-Croix-du-Mont |
| 33397 | 33560 | Sainte-Eulalie |
| 33401 | 33350 | Sainte-Florence |
| 33402 | 33220 | Sainte-Foy-la-Grande |
| 33403 | 33490 | Sainte-Foy-la-Longue |
| 33404 | 33580 | Sainte-Gemme |
| 33417 | 33480 | Sainte-Hélène |
| 33394 | 33330 | Saint-Émilion |
| 33468 | 33350 | Sainte-Radegonde |
| 33395 | 33180 | Saint-Estèphe |
| 33485 | 33350 | Sainte-Terre |
| 33396 | 33330 | Saint-Étienne-de-Lisse |
| 33398 | 33190 | Saint-Exupéry |
| 33399 | 33540 | Saint-Félix-de-Foncaude |
| 33400 | 33580 | Saint-Ferme |
| 33405 | 33390 | Saint-Genès-de-Blaye |
| 33406 | 33350 | Saint-Genès-de-Castillon |
| 33407 | 33240 | Saint-Genès-de-Fronsac |
| 33408 | 33670 | Saint-Genès-de-Lombaud |
| 33411 | 33490 | Saint-Germain-de-Grave |
| 33414 | 33240 | Saint-Germain-de-la-Rivière |
| 33412 | 33340 | Saint-Germain-d'Esteuil |
| 33413 | 33750 | Saint-Germain-du-Puch |
| 33415 | 33240 | Saint-Gervais |
| 33416 | 33920 | Saint-Girons-d'Aiguevives |
| 33418 | 33190 | Saint-Hilaire-de-la-Noaille |
| 33419 | 33540 | Saint-Hilaire-du-Bois |
| 33420 | 33330 | Saint-Hippolyte |
| 33421 | 33420 | Saint-Jean-de-Blaignac |
| 33422 | 33127 | Saint-Jean-d'Illac |
| 33423 | 33250 | Saint-Julien-Beychevelle |
| 33425 | 33240 | Saint-Laurent-d'Arce |
| 33426 | 33330 | Saint-Laurent-des-Combes |
| 33427 | 33540 | Saint-Laurent-du-Bois |
| 33428 | 33190 | Saint-Laurent-du-Plan |
| 33424 | 33112 | Saint-Laurent-Médoc |
| 33429 | 33113 | Saint-Léger-de-Balson |
| 33431 | 33670 | Saint-Léon |
| 33432 | 33210 | Saint-Loubert |
| 33433 | 33450 | Saint-Loubès |
| 33434 | 33440 | Saint-Louis-de-Montferrand |
| 33435 | 33490 | Saint-Macaire |
| 33436 | 33125 | Saint-Magne |
| 33437 | 33350 | Saint-Magne-de-Castillon |
| 33438 | 33490 | Saint-Maixant |
| 33439 | 33620 | Saint-Mariens |
| 33440 | 33490 | Saint-Martial |
| 33442 | 33910 | Saint-Martin-de-Laye |
| 33443 | 33540 | Saint-Martin-de-Lerm |
| 33444 | 33490 | Saint-Martin-de-Sescas |
| 33445 | 33910 | Saint-Martin-du-Bois |
| 33446 | 33540 | Saint-Martin-du-Puy |
| 33441 | 33390 | Saint-Martin-Lacaussade |
| 33447 | 33230 | Saint-Médard-de-Guizières |
| 33448 | 33650 | Saint-Médard-d'Eyrans |
| 33449 | 33160 | Saint-Médard-en-Jalles |
| 33450 | 33840 | Saint-Michel-de-Castelnau |
| 33451 | 33126 | Saint-Michel-de-Fronsac |
| 33453 | 33190 | Saint-Michel-de-Lapujade |
| 33452 | 33720 | Saint-Michel-de-Rieufret |
| 33454 | 33650 | Saint-Morillon |
| 33456 | 33820 | Saint-Palais |
| 33457 | 33210 | Saint-Pardon-de-Conques |
| 33458 | 33390 | Saint-Paul |
| 33459 | 33330 | Saint-Pey-d'Armens |
| 33460 | 33350 | Saint-Pey-de-Castets |
| 33461 | 33350 | Saint-Philippe-d'Aiguille |
| 33462 | 33220 | Saint-Philippe-du-Seignal |
| 33463 | 33490 | Saint-Pierre-d'Aurillac |
| 33464 | 33760 | Saint-Pierre-de-Bat |
| 33465 | 33210 | Saint-Pierre-de-Mons |
| 33466 | 33750 | Saint-Quentin-de-Baron |
| 33467 | 33220 | Saint-Quentin-de-Caplong |
| 33470 | 33240 | Saint-Romain-la-Virvée |
| 33471 | 33250 | Saint-Sauveur |
| 33472 | 33660 | Saint-Sauveur-de-Puynormand |
| 33473 | 33920 | Saint-Savin |
| 33474 | 33650 | Saint-Selve |
| 33475 | 33710 | Saint-Seurin-de-Bourg |
| 33476 | 33180 | Saint-Seurin-de-Cadourne |
| 33477 | 33390 | Saint-Seurin-de-Cursac |
| 33478 | 33660 | Saint-Seurin-sur-l'Isle |
| 33479 | 33190 | Saint-Sève |
| 33480 | 33330 | Saint-Sulpice-de-Faleyrens |
| 33481 | 33580 | Saint-Sulpice-de-Guilleragues |
| 33482 | 33540 | Saint-Sulpice-de-Pommiers |
| 33483 | 33450 | Saint-Sulpice-et-Cameyrac |
| 33484 | 33113 | Saint-Symphorien |
| 33486 | 33710 | Saint-Trojan |
| 33487 | 33440 | Saint-Vincent-de-Paul |
| 33488 | 33420 | Saint-Vincent-de-Pertignas |
| 33489 | 33920 | Saint-Vivien-de-Blaye |
| 33490 | 33590 | Saint-Vivien-de-Médoc |
| 33491 | 33580 | Saint-Vivien-de-Monségur |
| 33492 | 33920 | Saint-Yzan-de-Soudiac |
| 33493 | 33340 | Saint-Yzans-de-Médoc |
| 33494 | 33160 | Salaunes |
| 33496 | 33370 | Sallebœuf |
| 33498 | 33770 | Salles |
| 33499 | 33350 | Les Salles-de-Castillon |
| 33500 | 33710 | Samonac |
| 33501 | 33650 | Saucats |
| 33502 | 33920 | Saugon |
| 33503 | 33680 | Saumos |
| 33504 | 33210 | Sauternes |
| 33505 | 33670 | La Sauve |
| 33506 | 33540 | Sauveterre-de-Guyenne |
| 33507 | 33430 | Sauviac |
| 33508 | 33124 | Savignac |
| 33509 | 33910 | Savignac-de-l'Isle |
| 33510 | 33490 | Semens |
| 33511 | 33690 | Sendets |
| 33512 | 33690 | Sigalens |
| 33513 | 33690 | Sillas |
| 33514 | 33780 | Soulac-sur-Mer |
| 33515 | 33760 | Soulignac |
| 33516 | 33790 | Soussac |
| 33517 | 33460 | Soussans |
| 33518 | 33550 | Tabanac |
| 33519 | 33320 | Le Taillan-Médoc |
| 33520 | 33580 | Taillecavat |
| 33521 | 33590 | Talais |
| 33522 | 33400 | Talence |
| 33523 | 33760 | Targon |
| 33524 | 33240 | Tarnès |
| 33525 | 33710 | Tauriac |
| 33526 | 33570 | Tayac |
| 33527 | 33470 | Le Teich |
| 33528 | 33680 | Le Temple |
| 33529 | 33260 | La Teste-de-Buch |
| 33530 | 33710 | Teuillac |
| 33531 | 33420 | Tizac-de-Curton |
| 33532 | 33620 | Tizac-de-Lapouyade |
| 33533 | 33210 | Toulenne |
| 33534 | 33550 | Le Tourne |
| 33535 | 33370 | Tresses |
| 33536 | 33125 | Le Tuzan |
| 33537 | 33730 | Uzeste |
| 33380 | 33820 | Val-de-Livenne |
| 33018 | 33240 | Val-de-Virvée |
| 33538 | 33340 | Valeyrac |
| 33539 | 33870 | Vayres |
| 33540 | 33930 | Vendays-Montalivet |
| 33541 | 33590 | Vensac |
| 33542 | 33240 | Vérac |
| 33543 | 33490 | Verdelais |
| 33544 | 33123 | Le Verdon-sur-Mer |
| 33545 | 33180 | Vertheuil |
| 33546 | 33330 | Vignonet |
| 33547 | 33730 | Villandraut |
| 33548 | 33141 | Villegouge |
| 33549 | 33550 | Villenave-de-Rions |
| 33550 | 33140 | Villenave-d'Ornon |
| 33551 | 33710 | Villeneuve |
| 33552 | 33720 | Virelade |
| 33553 | 33240 | Virsac |
| 33554 | 33370 | Yvrac |
