= Mombrier =

- Commune
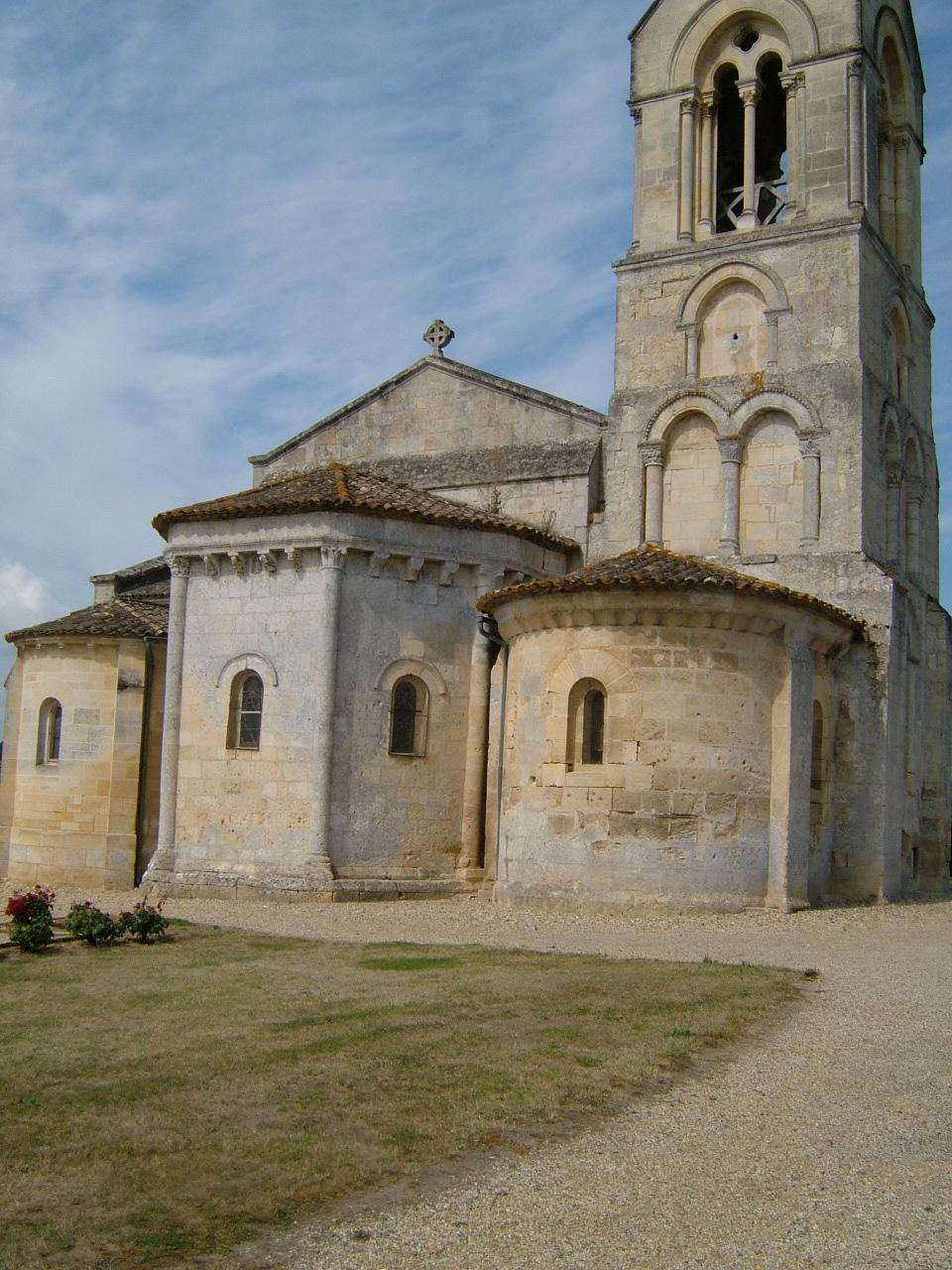
- The church in Mombrier
- Location of Mombrier
- Location within France Location within Nouvelle-Aquitaine
- Coordinates: 45°04′47″N 0°33′08″W
- Country: France
- Region: Nouvelle-Aquitaine
- Department: Gironde
- Arrondissement: Blaye
- Canton: L'Estuaire
- Intercommunality: Grand Cubzaguais

Government
  - Mayor (2020–2026): Valérie Guinaudie
- Area^{1}: 4.25 km^{2} (1.64 sq mi)
- Elevation: 30 m (98 ft)
- Highest elevation: 83 m (272 ft)
- Lowest elevation: 17 m (56 ft)
- Population (2023): 477
  - Density: 112/km^{2} (291/sq mi)
- Time zone: UTC+01:00 (CET)
  - Summer (DST): UTC+02:00 (CEST)
- INSEE/Postal code: 33285 /33710
- ^{1} French Land Register data, which excludes lakes, ponds, glaciers > 1 km^{2} (0.386 sq mi or 247 acres) and river estuaries.

Mombrier (French pronunciation: [mɔ̃bʁije]) is a commune in the Gironde department in Nouvelle-Aquitaine in southwestern France.

== Population ==
Historical population
Year	Pop.	±% p.a.
1968	399	—
1975	425	+0.91%
1982	374	−1.81%
1990	363	−0.37%
1999	343	−0.63%
2007	357	+0.50%
2012	382	+1.36%
2017	423	+2.06%
2023	477	+2.02%
Source: INSEE

== See also ==
- Communes of the Gironde department
