= Laruscade =

- Commune
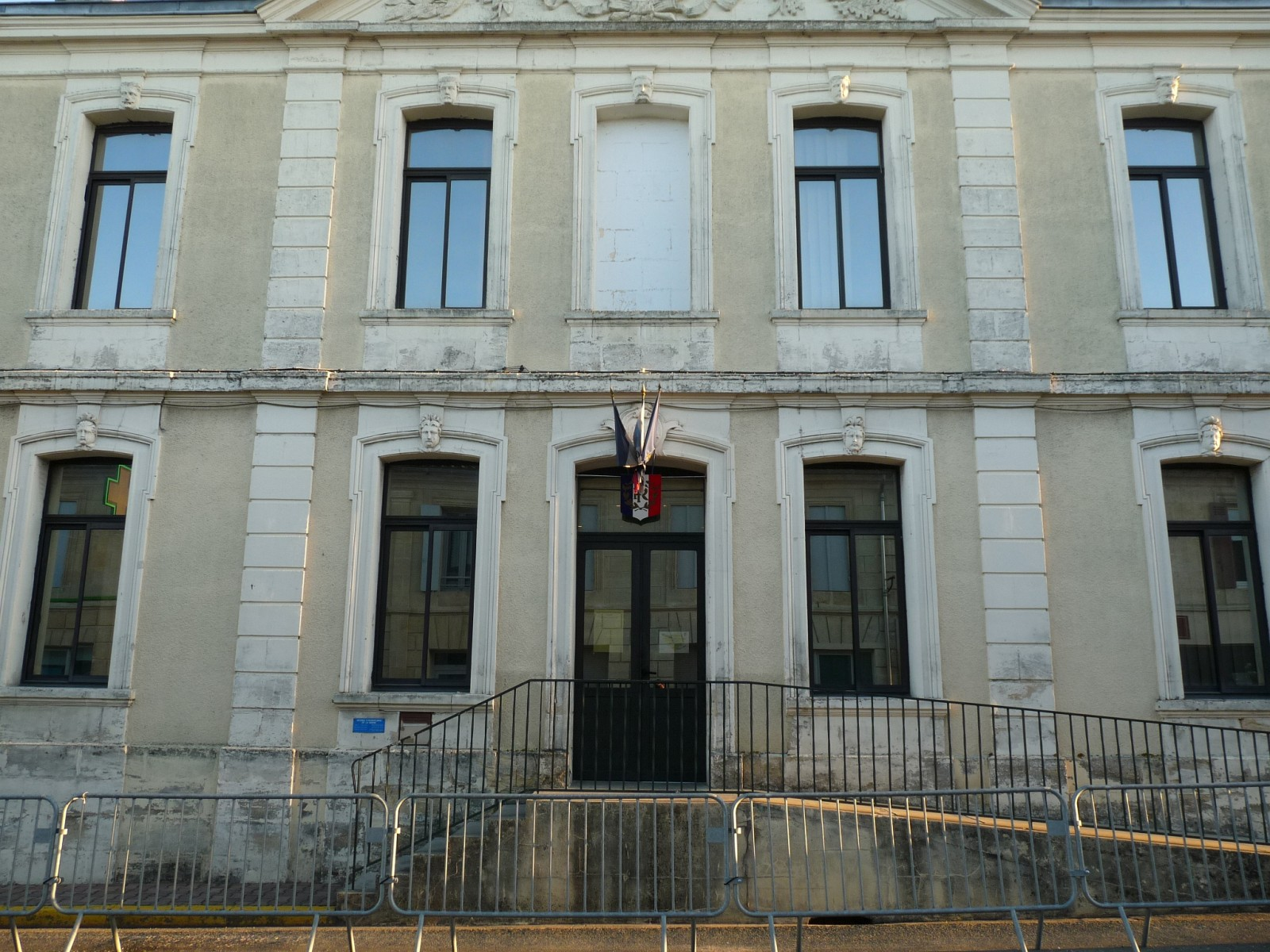
- The town hall in Laruscade

- Coat of arms
- Location of Laruscade
- Location within France Location within Nouvelle-Aquitaine
- Coordinates: 45°06′31″N 0°20′23″W
- Country: France
- Region: Nouvelle-Aquitaine
- Department: Gironde
- Arrondissement: Blaye
- Canton: Le Nord-Gironde
- Intercommunality: Latitude Nord Gironde

Government
  - Mayor (2020–2026): Jean-Paul Labeyrie
- Area^{1}: 46.76 km^{2} (18.05 sq mi)
- Elevation: 103 m (338 ft)
- Highest elevation: 106 m (348 ft)
- Lowest elevation: 18 m (59 ft)
- Population (2023): 2,811
  - Density: 60.12/km^{2} (155.7/sq mi)
- Time zone: UTC+01:00 (CET)
  - Summer (DST): UTC+02:00 (CEST)
- INSEE/Postal code: 33233 /33620
- ^{1} French Land Register data, which excludes lakes, ponds, glaciers > 1 km^{2} (0.386 sq mi or 247 acres) and river estuaries.

Laruscade (French pronunciation: [laʁyskad]) is a commune in the Gironde department in Nouvelle-Aquitaine in southwestern France.

== Population ==
Historical population
Year	Pop.	±% p.a.
1968	1,340	—
1975	1,332	−0.09%
1982	1,475	+1.47%
1990	1,679	+1.63%
1999	1,693	+0.09%
2007	2,155	+3.06%
2012	2,469	+2.76%
2017	2,765	+2.29%
2023	2,811	+0.28%
Source: INSEE

== See also ==
- Communes of the Gironde department
