= Saint-Martin-Lacaussade =

- Commune
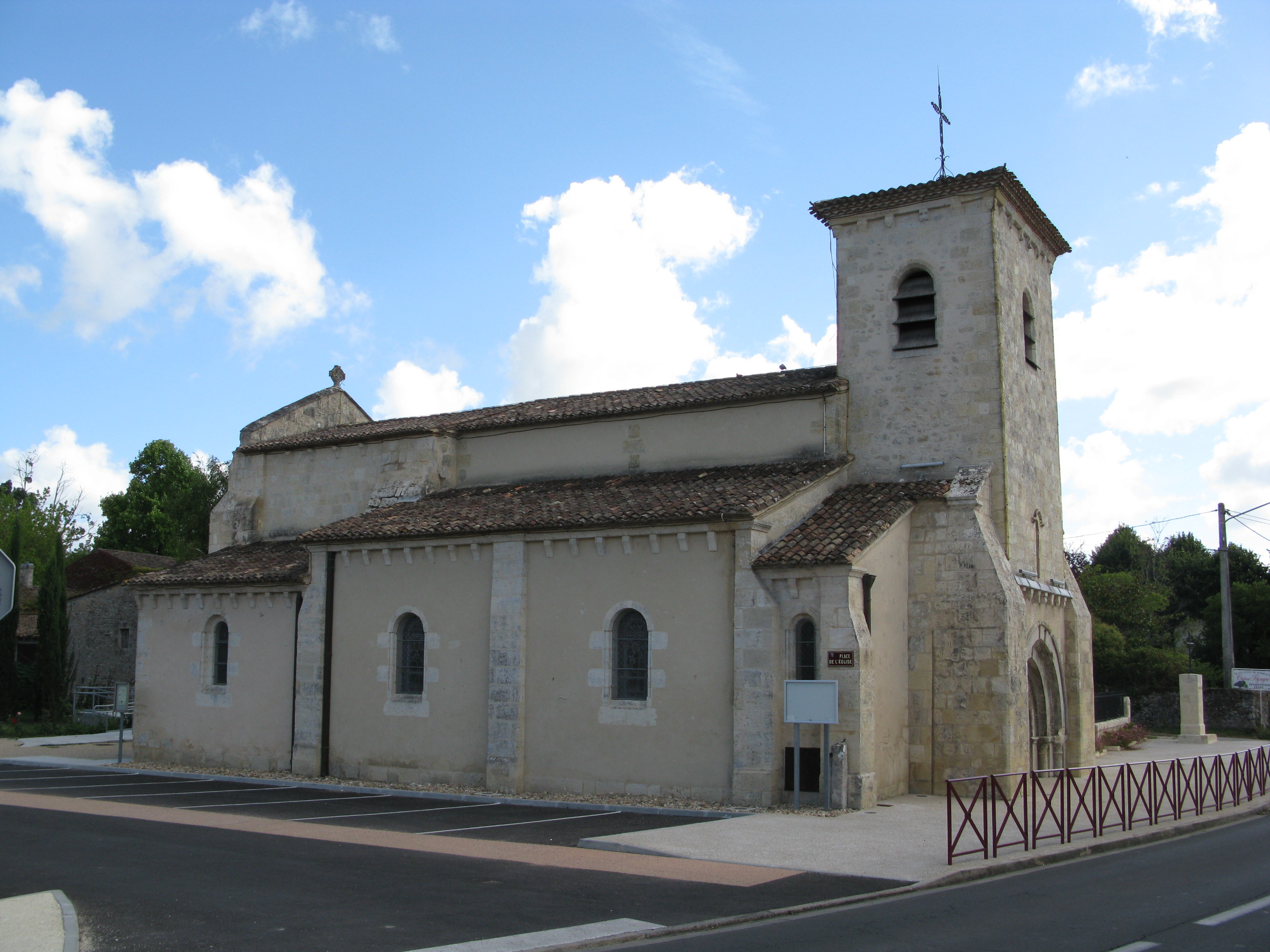
- The church in Saint-Martin-Lacaussade
- Location of Saint-Martin-Lacaussade
- Location within France Location within Nouvelle-Aquitaine
- Coordinates: 45°08′52″N 0°38′29″W
- Country: France
- Region: Nouvelle-Aquitaine
- Department: Gironde
- Arrondissement: Blaye
- Canton: L'Estuaire
- Intercommunality: Blaye

Government
  - Mayor (2020–2026): Julien Bedis
- Area^{1}: 3.94 km^{2} (1.52 sq mi)
- Elevation: 23 m (75 ft)
- Highest elevation: 39 m (128 ft)
- Lowest elevation: 2 m (6.6 ft)
- Population (2023): 1,171
  - Density: 297/km^{2} (770/sq mi)
- Time zone: UTC+01:00 (CET)
  - Summer (DST): UTC+02:00 (CEST)
- INSEE/Postal code: 33441 /33390
- ^{1} French Land Register data, which excludes lakes, ponds, glaciers > 1 km^{2} (0.386 sq mi or 247 acres) and river estuaries.

Saint-Martin-Lacaussade (French pronunciation: [sɛ̃ maʁtɛ̃ lakosad]) is a commune in the Gironde department in Nouvelle-Aquitaine in southwestern France.

== Population ==
Historical population
Year	Pop.	±% p.a.
1968	588	—
1975	595	+0.17%
1982	791	+4.15%
1990	798	+0.11%
1999	856	+0.78%
2007	992	+1.86%
2012	1,068	+1.49%
2017	1,118	+0.92%
2023	1,171	+0.77%
Source: INSEE

== See also ==
- Communes of the Gironde department
