= Saint-Christoly-de-Blaye =

- Commune
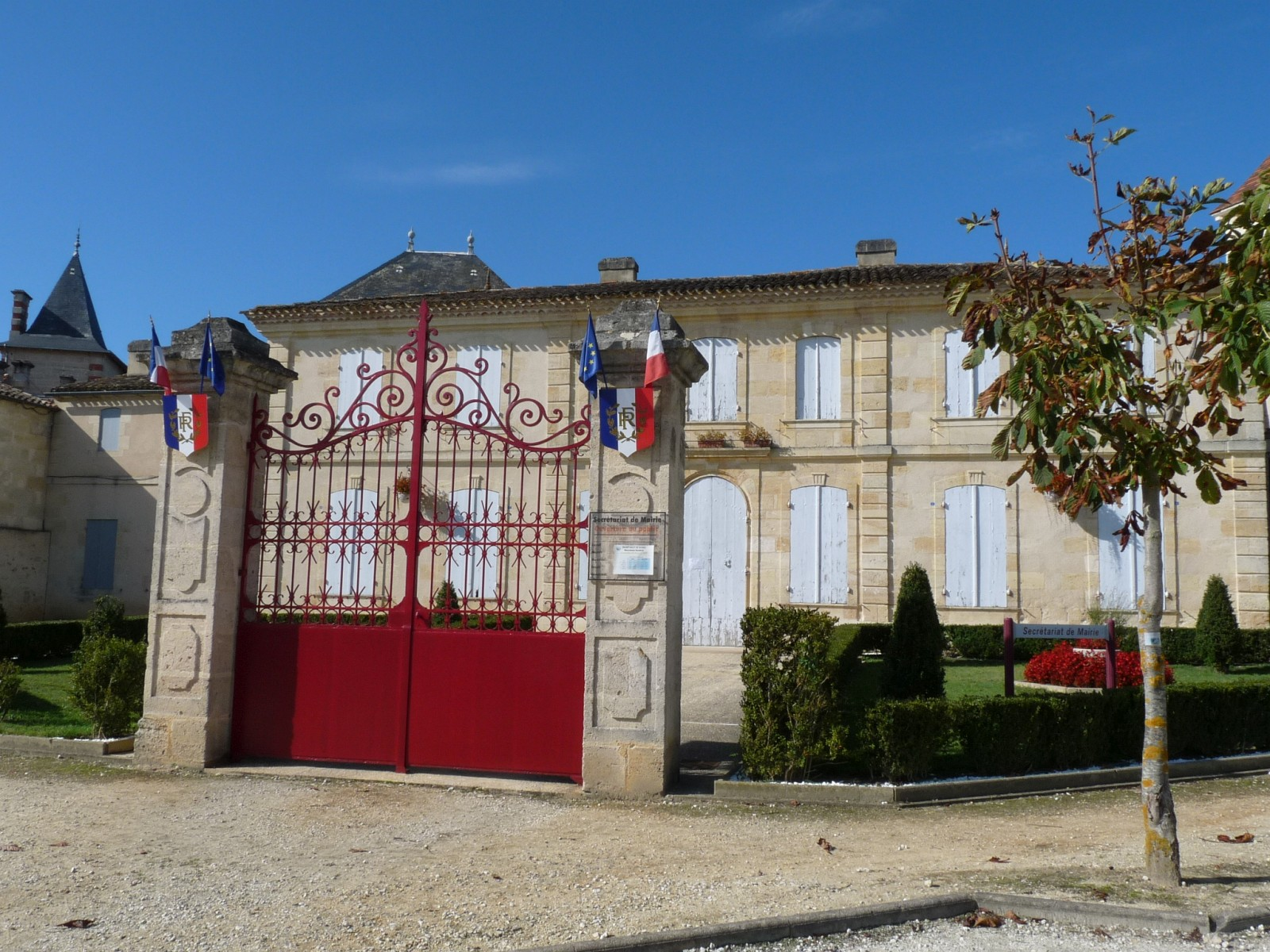
- The town hall in Saint-Christoly-de-Blaye
- Location of Saint-Christoly-de-Blaye
- Location within France Location within Nouvelle-Aquitaine
- Coordinates: 45°07′53″N 0°30′24″W
- Country: France
- Region: Nouvelle-Aquitaine
- Department: Gironde
- Arrondissement: Blaye
- Canton: Le Nord-Gironde
- Intercommunality: Blaye

Government
  - Mayor (2020–2026): Murielle Picq
- Area^{1}: 28.06 km^{2} (10.83 sq mi)
- Elevation: 41 m (135 ft)
- Highest elevation: 78 m (256 ft)
- Lowest elevation: 9 m (30 ft)
- Population (2023): 1,879
  - Density: 66.96/km^{2} (173.4/sq mi)
- Time zone: UTC+01:00 (CET)
  - Summer (DST): UTC+02:00 (CEST)
- INSEE/Postal code: 33382 /33920
- ^{1} French Land Register data, which excludes lakes, ponds, glaciers > 1 km^{2} (0.386 sq mi or 247 acres) and river estuaries.

Saint-Christoly-de-Blaye (French pronunciation: [sɛ̃ kʁistɔli də blaj], literally Saint-Christoly of Blaye) is a commune in the Gironde department in Nouvelle-Aquitaine in southwestern France.

== Population ==
Historical population
Year	Pop.	±% p.a.
1968	1,621	—
1975	1,687	+0.57%
1982	1,733	+0.39%
1990	1,765	+0.23%
1999	1,771	+0.04%
2007	1,890	+0.82%
2012	2,039	+1.53%
2017	1,973	−0.66%
2023	1,879	−0.81%
Source: INSEE

== See also ==
- Communes of the Gironde department
