= Saugon =

- Commune
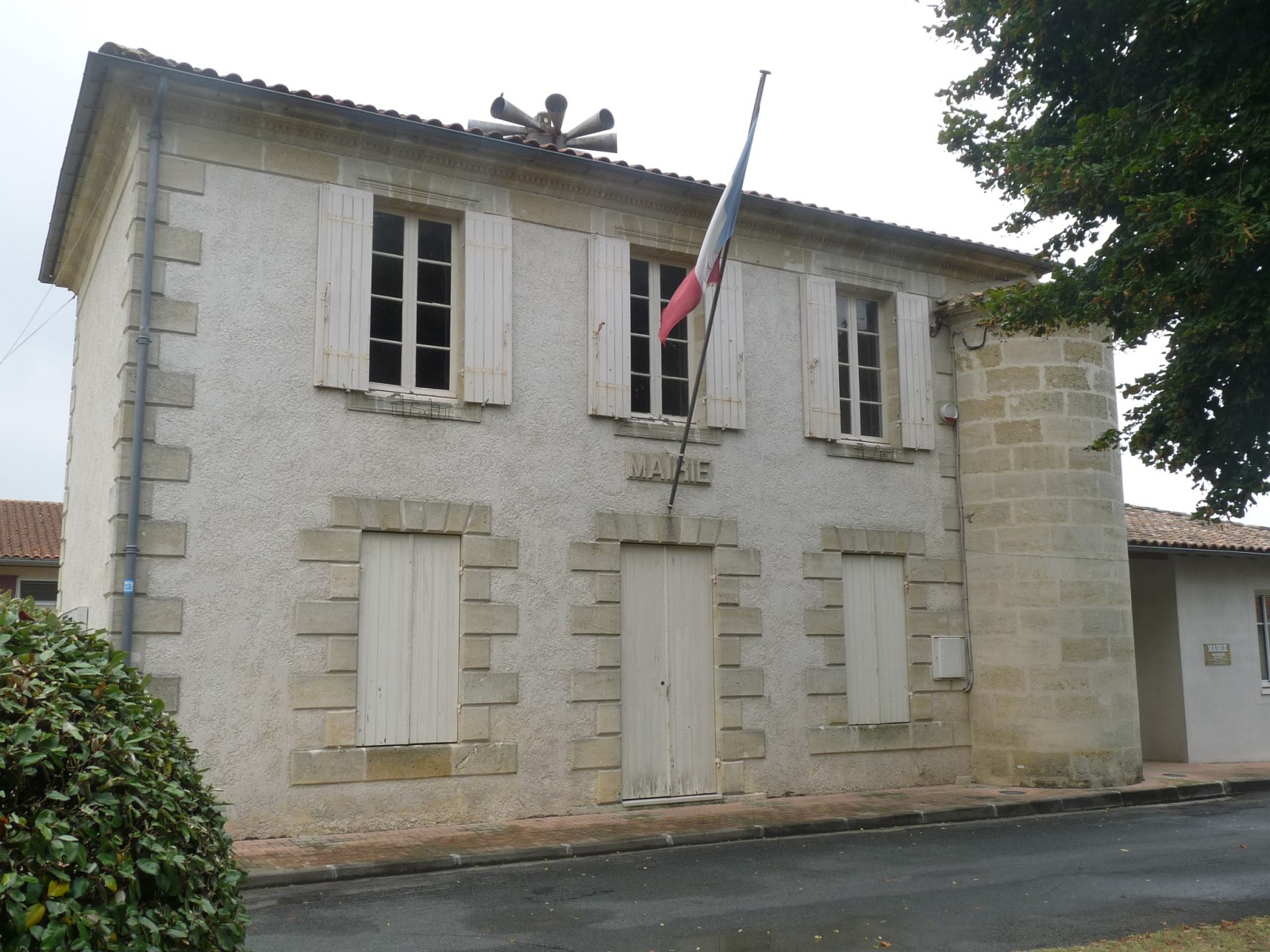
- The town hall in Saugon
- Location of Saugon
- Location within France Location within Nouvelle-Aquitaine
- Coordinates: 45°10′45″N 0°30′07″W
- Country: France
- Region: Nouvelle-Aquitaine
- Department: Gironde
- Arrondissement: Blaye
- Canton: Le Nord-Gironde
- Intercommunality: Blaye

Government
  - Mayor (2020–2026): Marie-Claire Soulard
- Area^{1}: 15.5 km^{2} (6.0 sq mi)
- Elevation: 150 m (490 ft)
- Highest elevation: 66 m (217 ft)
- Lowest elevation: 17 m (56 ft)
- Population (2023): 504
  - Density: 32.5/km^{2} (84.2/sq mi)
- Time zone: UTC+01:00 (CET)
  - Summer (DST): UTC+02:00 (CEST)
- INSEE/Postal code: 33502 /33920
- ^{1} French Land Register data, which excludes lakes, ponds, glaciers > 1 km^{2} (0.386 sq mi or 247 acres) and river estuaries.

Saugon (French pronunciation: [soɡɔ̃]) is a commune in the Gironde department in Nouvelle-Aquitaine in southwestern France.

== Population ==
Historical population
| Year | Pop. | ±% p.a. |
|---|---|---|
| 1968 | 306 | — |
| 1975 | 274 | −1.57% |
| 1982 | 283 | +0.46% |
| 1990 | 295 | +0.52% |
| 1999 | 329 | +1.22% |
| 2007 | 386 | +2.02% |
| 2012 | 426 | +1.99% |
| 2017 | 475 | +2.20% |
| 2023 | 504 | +0.99% |
Source: INSEE

== See also ==
- Communes of the Gironde department
