= Saint-Laurent-d'Arce =

- Commune
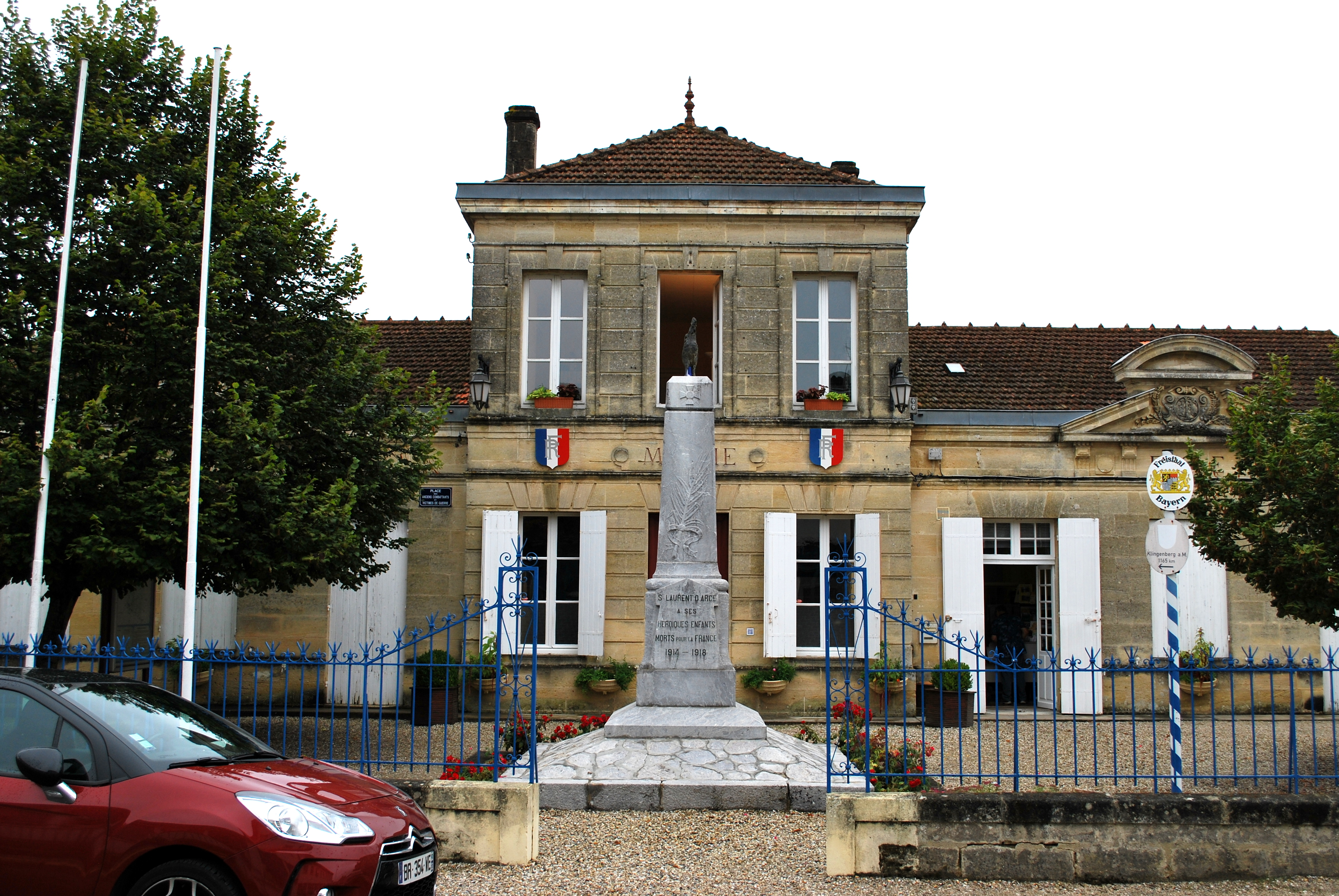
- The town hall in Saint-Laurent-d'Arce

- Coat of arms
- Location of Saint-Laurent-d'Arce
- Location within France Location within Nouvelle-Aquitaine
- Coordinates: 45°02′08″N 0°28′08″W
- Country: France
- Region: Nouvelle-Aquitaine
- Department: Gironde
- Arrondissement: Blaye
- Canton: Le Nord-Gironde

Government
  - Mayor (2020–2026): Jean-Pierre Suberville
- Area^{1}: 8.07 km^{2} (3.12 sq mi)
- Elevation: 36 m (118 ft)
- Highest elevation: 46 m (151 ft)
- Lowest elevation: 3 m (9.8 ft)
- Population (2023): 1,580
  - Density: 196/km^{2} (507/sq mi)
- Time zone: UTC+01:00 (CET)
  - Summer (DST): UTC+02:00 (CEST)
- INSEE/Postal code: 33425 /33240
- ^{1} French Land Register data, which excludes lakes, ponds, glaciers > 1 km^{2} (0.386 sq mi or 247 acres) and river estuaries.

Saint-Laurent-d'Arce (French pronunciation: [sɛ̃ loʁɑ̃ daʁs]; Occitan: Sent Laurenç d'Arce) is a commune in the Gironde department in Nouvelle-Aquitaine in southwestern France.

== Population ==
Historical population
Year	Pop.	±% p.a.
1968	782	—
1975	877	+1.65%
1982	1,020	+2.18%
1990	1,140	+1.40%
1999	1,057	−0.84%
2007	1,289	+2.51%
2012	1,370	+1.23%
2017	1,449	+1.13%
2023	1,580	+1.45%
Source: INSEE

== See also ==
- Communes of the Gironde department
