= Peujard =

- Commune
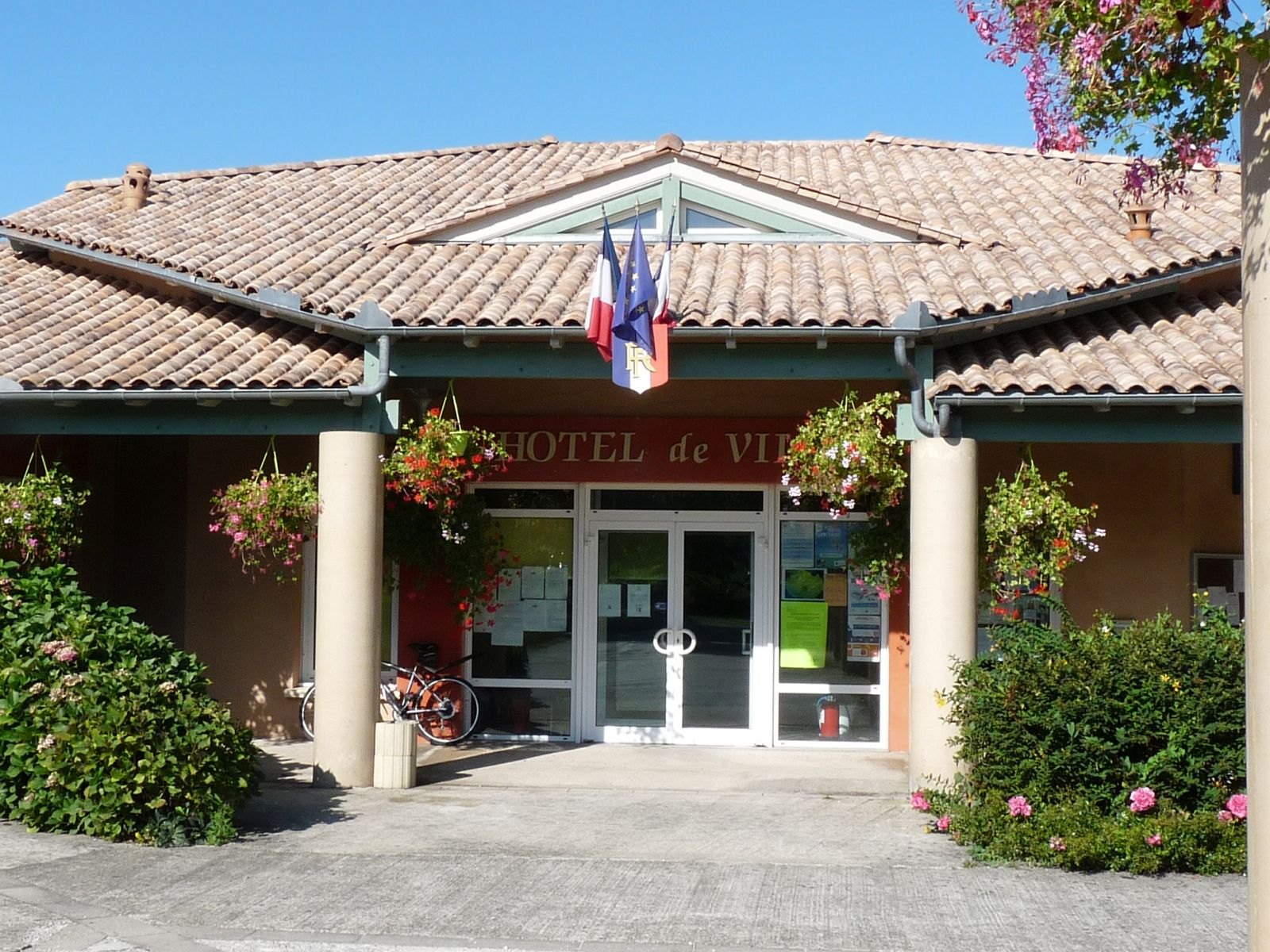
- The town hall in Peujard
- Location of Peujard
- Location within France Location within Nouvelle-Aquitaine
- Coordinates: 45°02′50″N 0°25′45″W
- Country: France
- Region: Nouvelle-Aquitaine
- Department: Gironde
- Arrondissement: Blaye
- Canton: Le Nord-Gironde

Government
  - Mayor (2022–2026): José Lagabarre
- Area^{1}: 10.98 km^{2} (4.24 sq mi)
- Elevation: 33 m (108 ft)
- Highest elevation: 54 m (177 ft)
- Lowest elevation: 10 m (33 ft)
- Population (2023): 2,195
  - Density: 199.9/km^{2} (517.8/sq mi)
- Time zone: UTC+01:00 (CET)
  - Summer (DST): UTC+02:00 (CEST)
- INSEE/Postal code: 33321 /33240
- ^{1} French Land Register data, which excludes lakes, ponds, glaciers > 1 km^{2} (0.386 sq mi or 247 acres) and river estuaries.

Peujard (French pronunciation: [pøʒaʁ]; Occitan: Pujarn) is a commune in the Gironde department in Nouvelle-Aquitaine in southwestern France.

== Population ==
Historical population
Year	Pop.	±% p.a.
1968	596	—
1975	598	+0.05%
1982	879	+5.66%
1990	1,039	+2.11%
1999	1,399	+3.36%
2007	1,655	+2.12%
2012	1,906	+2.86%
2017	2,173	+2.66%
2023	2,195	+0.17%
Source: INSEE

== See also ==
- Communes of the Gironde department
