= Périssac =

- Commune
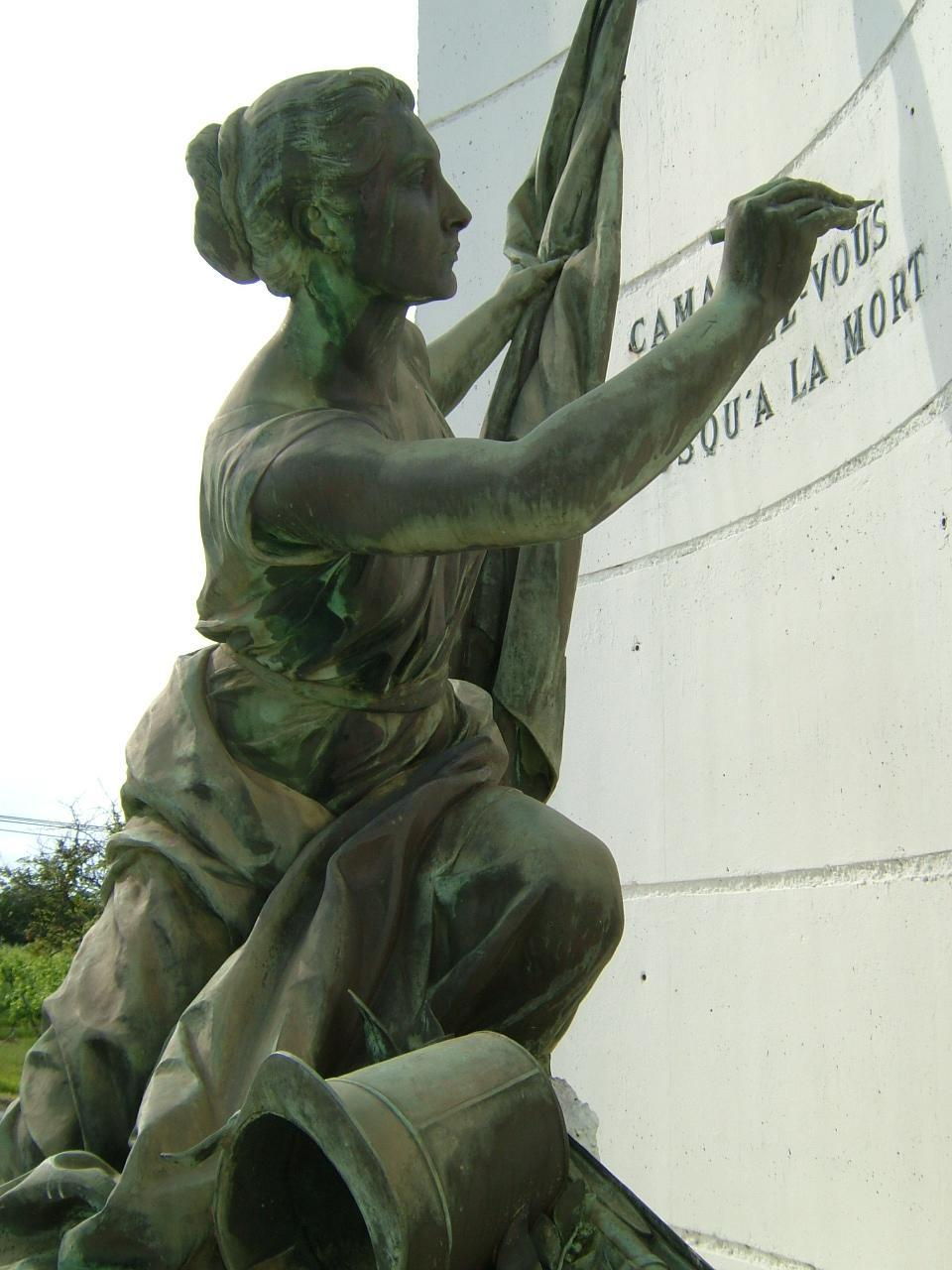
- War memorial
- Location of Périssac
- Location within France Location within Nouvelle-Aquitaine
- Coordinates: 45°01′11″N 0°19′22″W
- Country: France
- Region: Nouvelle-Aquitaine
- Department: Gironde
- Arrondissement: Libourne
- Canton: Le Nord-Gironde
- Intercommunality: Fronsadais

Government
  - Mayor (2020–2026): Valérie Vigier
- Area^{1}: 12.16 km^{2} (4.70 sq mi)
- Elevation: 56 m (184 ft)
- Highest elevation: 59 m (194 ft)
- Lowest elevation: 7 m (23 ft)
- Population (2023): 1,184
  - Density: 97.37/km^{2} (252.2/sq mi)
- Time zone: UTC+01:00 (CET)
  - Summer (DST): UTC+02:00 (CEST)
- INSEE/Postal code: 33317 /33240
- ^{1} French Land Register data, which excludes lakes, ponds, glaciers > 1 km^{2} (0.386 sq mi or 247 acres) and river estuaries.

Périssac (French pronunciation: [peʁisak]) is a commune in the Gironde department in Nouvelle-Aquitaine in southwestern France.

== Population ==
Historical population
Year	Pop.	±% p.a.
1968	621	—
1975	642	+0.48%
1982	719	+1.63%
1990	864	+2.32%
1999	877	+0.17%
2007	1,029	+2.02%
2012	1,081	+0.99%
2017	1,198	+2.08%
2023	1,184	−0.20%
Source: INSEE

== See also ==
- Communes of the Gironde department
