= Gauriaguet =

- Commune
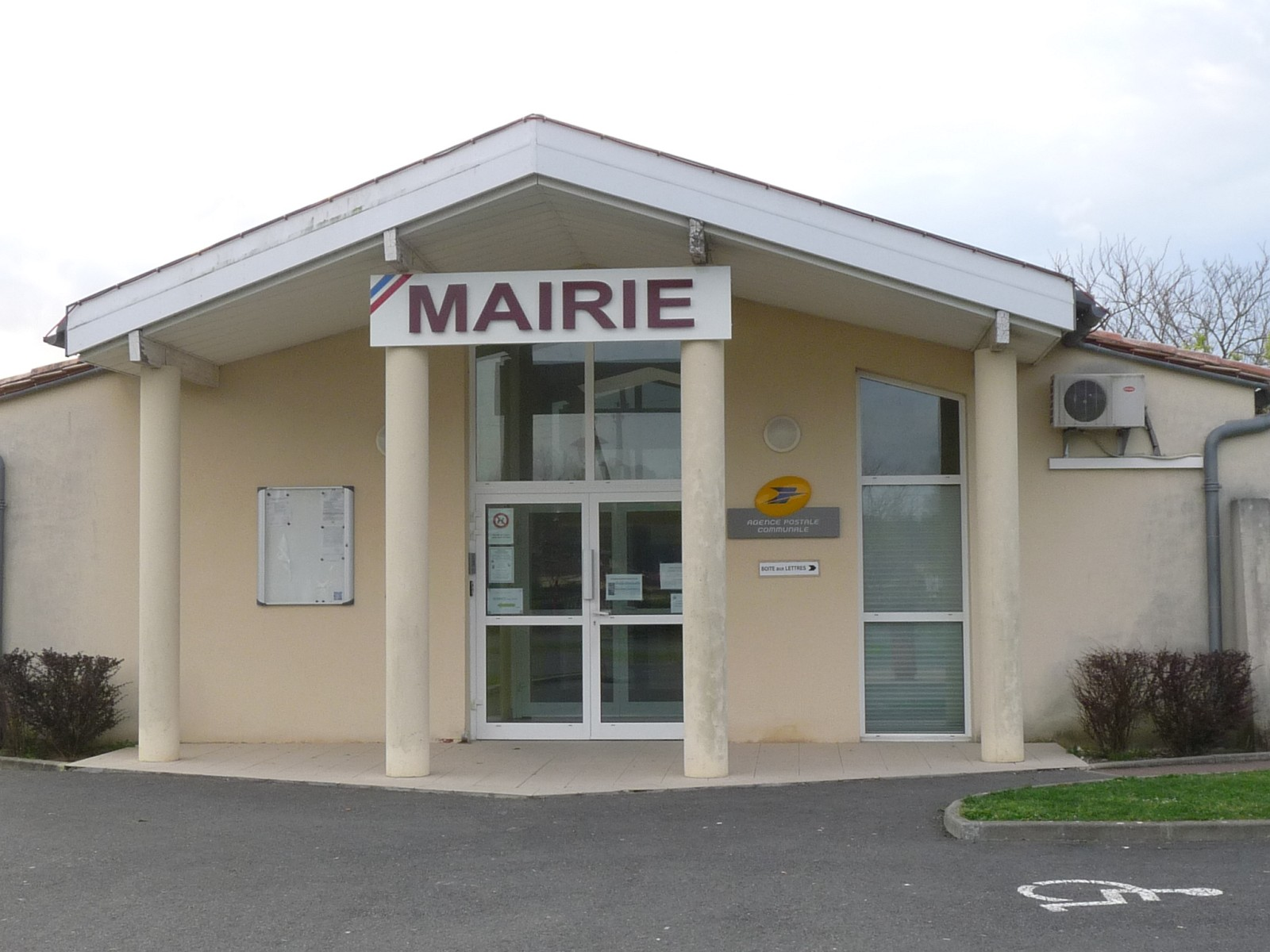
- The town hall in Gauriaguet
- Location of Gauriaguet
- Location within France Location within Nouvelle-Aquitaine
- Coordinates: 45°02′24″N 0°23′28″W
- Country: France
- Region: Nouvelle-Aquitaine
- Department: Gironde
- Arrondissement: Blaye
- Canton: Le Nord-Gironde

Government
  - Mayor (2020–2026): Alain Montangon
- Area^{1}: 5.37 km^{2} (2.07 sq mi)
- Elevation: 51 m (167 ft)
- Highest elevation: 54 m (177 ft)
- Lowest elevation: 23 m (75 ft)
- Population (2023): 1,599
  - Density: 298/km^{2} (771/sq mi)
- Time zone: UTC+01:00 (CET)
  - Summer (DST): UTC+02:00 (CEST)
- INSEE/Postal code: 33183 /33240
- ^{1} French Land Register data, which excludes lakes, ponds, glaciers > 1 km^{2} (0.386 sq mi or 247 acres) and river estuaries.

Gauriaguet (French pronunciation: [ɡoʁjaɡɛ]) is a commune in the Gironde department in southwestern France.

== Population ==
Historical population
Year	Pop.	±% p.a.
1968	358	—
1975	445	+3.16%
1982	645	+5.45%
1990	898	+4.22%
1999	942	+0.53%
2007	1,060	+1.49%
2012	1,183	+2.22%
2017	1,283	+1.64%
2023	1,599	+3.74%
Source: INSEE

== See also ==
- Communes of the Gironde department
