= Saint-Gervais, Gironde =

Saint-Gervais
- Commune
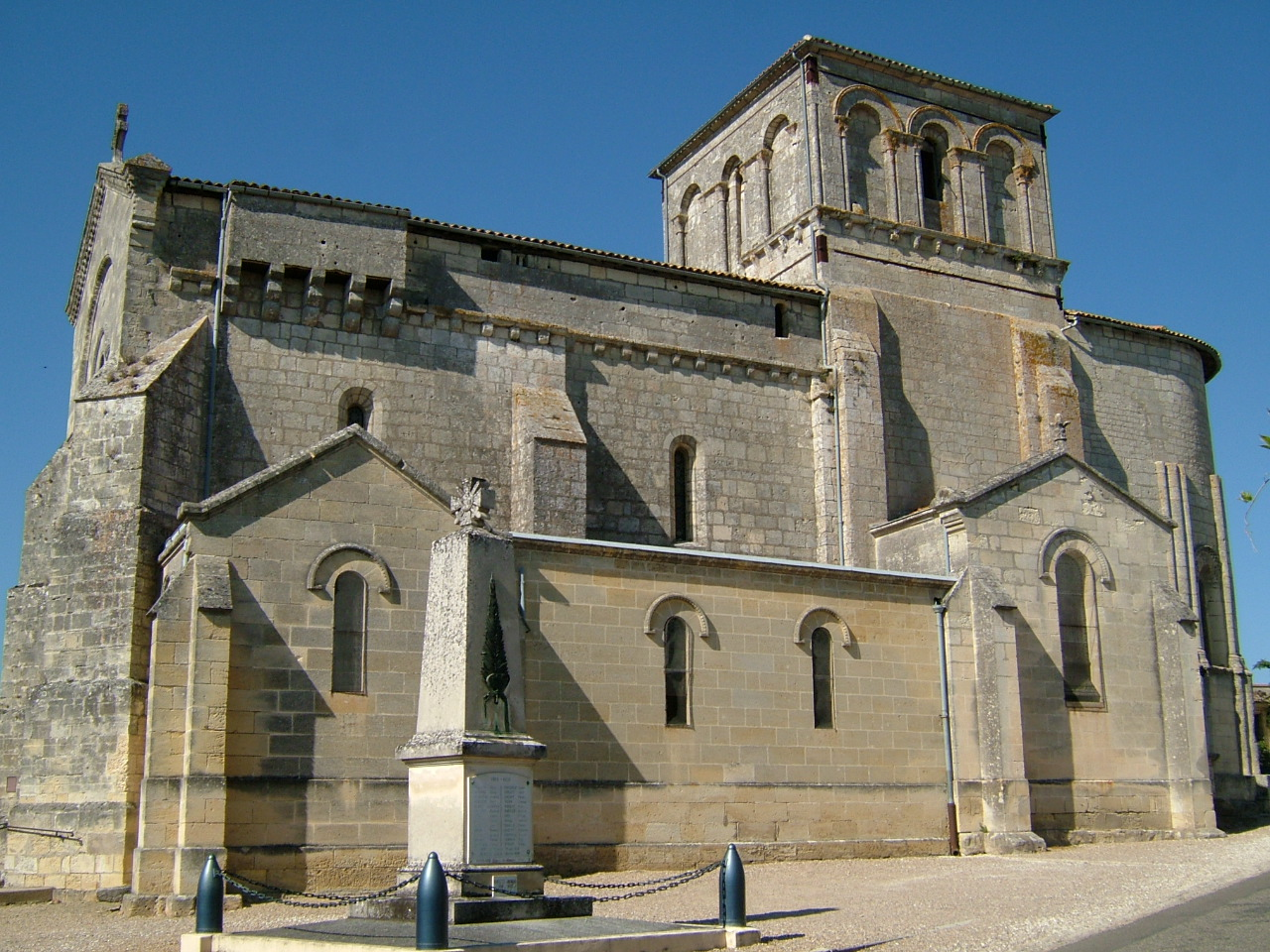
- The church in Saint-Gervais

- Coat of arms
- Location of Saint-Gervais
- Location within France Location within Nouvelle-Aquitaine
- Coordinates: 45°01′08″N 0°27′44″W
- Country: France
- Region: Nouvelle-Aquitaine
- Department: Gironde
- Arrondissement: Blaye
- Canton: Le Nord-Gironde

Government
  - Mayor (2023–2026): Patrice Potier
- Area^{1}: 5.58 km^{2} (2.15 sq mi)
- Elevation: 25 m (82 ft)
- Highest elevation: 50 m (160 ft)
- Lowest elevation: 3 m (9.8 ft)
- Population (2023): 1,983
  - Density: 355/km^{2} (920/sq mi)
- Time zone: UTC+01:00 (CET)
  - Summer (DST): UTC+02:00 (CEST)
- INSEE/Postal code: 33415 /33240
- ^{1} French Land Register data, which excludes lakes, ponds, glaciers > 1 km^{2} (0.386 sq mi or 247 acres) and river estuaries.

Saint-Gervais (French pronunciation: [sɛ̃ ʒɛʁvɛ]; Occitan: Sent Gervasi) is a commune in the Gironde department in Nouvelle-Aquitaine in southwestern France.

== Population ==
Historical population
Year	Pop.	±% p.a.
1968	808	—
1975	903	+1.60%
1982	1,026	+1.84%
1990	1,204	+2.02%
1999	1,219	+0.14%
2007	1,407	+1.81%
2012	1,580	+2.35%
2017	1,878	+3.52%
2023	1,983	+0.91%
Source: INSEE

== See also ==
- Communes of the Gironde department
