= Arrondissement of Blaye =

Coordinates: 45°07′N 0°40′W

Blaye
- Arrondissement
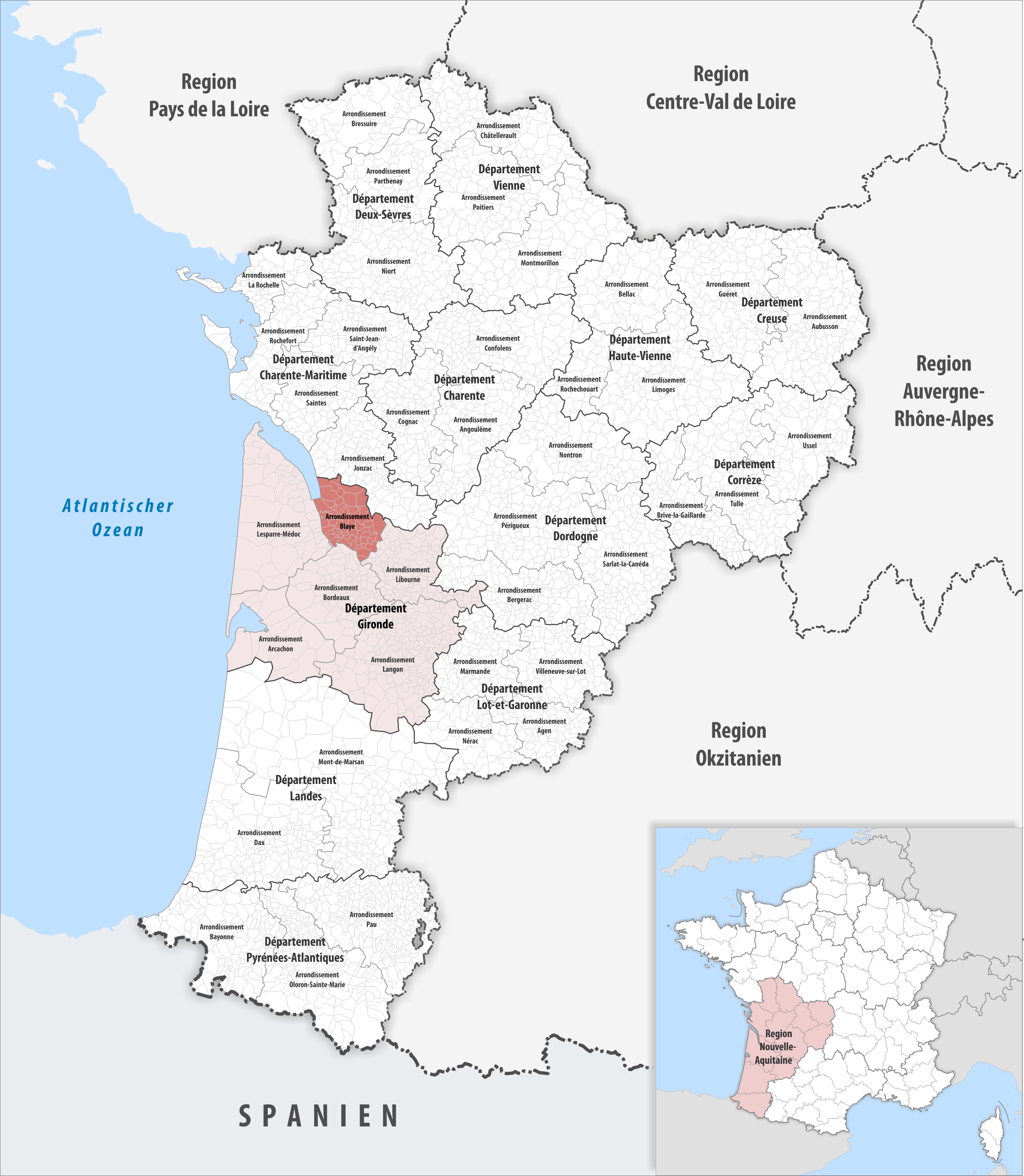
- Location within the region Nouvelle-Aquitaine
- Country: France
- Region: Nouvelle-Aquitaine
- Department: Gironde
- No. of communes: {{{nbcomm}}}
- Area: 782.4 km^{2} (302.1 sq mi)
- Population (2023): 96,249
  - Density: 123.0/km^{2} (318.6/sq mi)
- INSEE code: 331

The Arrondissement of Blaye is an arrondissement of France in the Gironde department in the Nouvelle-Aquitaine region. It has 62 communes. Its population is 94,930 (2021), and its area is 782.4 km^{2} (302.1 sq mi).

== Composition ==
The communes of the arrondissement of Blaye are:

1. Anglade
2. Bayon-sur-Gironde
3. Berson
4. Blaye
5. Bourg
6. Braud-et-Saint-Louis
7. Campugnan
8. Cars
9. Cartelègue
10. Cavignac
11. Cézac
12. Civrac-de-Blaye
13. Comps
14. Cubnezais
15. Cubzac-les-Ponts
16. Donnezac
17. Étauliers
18. Eyrans
19. Fours
20. Gauriac
21. Gauriaguet
22. Générac
23. Lansac
24. Laruscade
25. Marcenais
26. Marsas
27. Mazion
28. Mombrier
29. Peujard
30. Plassac
31. Pleine-Selve
32. Prignac-et-Marcamps
33. Pugnac
34. Reignac
35. Saint-André-de-Cubzac
36. Saint-Androny
37. Saint-Aubin-de-Blaye
38. Saint-Christoly-de-Blaye
39. Saint-Ciers-de-Canesse
40. Saint-Ciers-sur-Gironde
41. Saint-Genès-de-Blaye
42. Saint-Gervais
43. Saint-Girons-d'Aiguevives
44. Saint-Laurent-d'Arce
45. Saint-Mariens
46. Saint-Martin-Lacaussade
47. Saint-Palais
48. Saint-Paul
49. Saint-Savin
50. Saint-Seurin-de-Bourg
51. Saint-Seurin-de-Cursac
52. Saint-Trojan
53. Saint-Vivien-de-Blaye
54. Saint-Yzan-de-Soudiac
55. Samonac
56. Saugon
57. Tauriac
58. Teuillac
59. Val-de-Livenne
60. Val-de-Virvée
61. Villeneuve
62. Virsac

== History ==
The arrondissement of Blaye was created in 1800. At the May 2006 reorganisation of the arrondissements of Gironde, it gained the canton of Saint-André-de-Cubzac from the arrondissement of Bordeaux.

As a result of the reorganisation of the cantons of France which came into effect in 2015, the borders of the cantons are no longer related to the borders of the arrondissements. The cantons of the arrondissement of Blaye were, as of January 2015:

1. Blaye
2. Bourg
3. Saint-André-de-Cubzac
4. Saint-Ciers-sur-Gironde
5. Saint-Savin
