= Marcenais =

- Commune
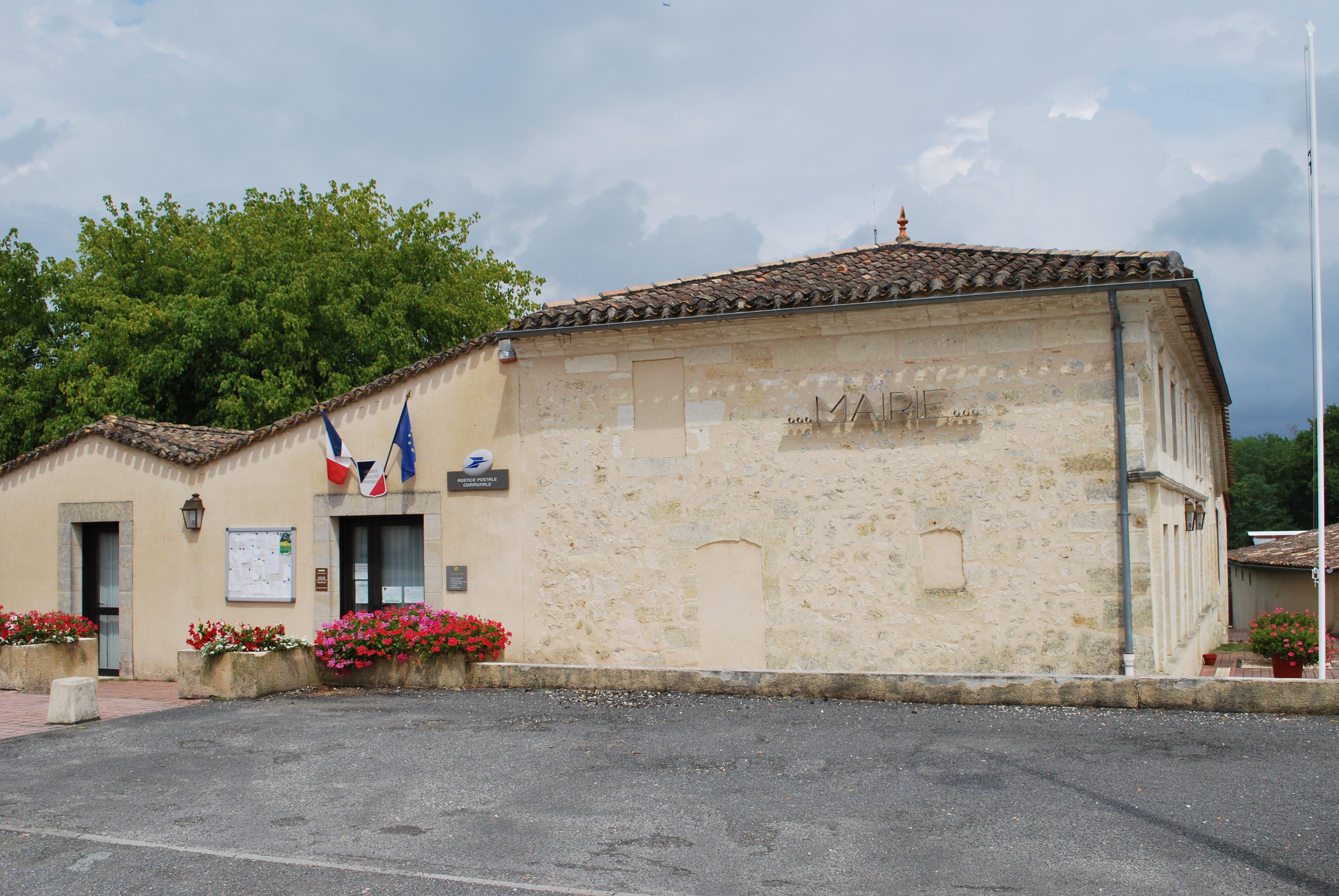
- The town hall in Marcenais

- Coat of arms
- Location of Marcenais
- Location within France Location within Nouvelle-Aquitaine
- Coordinates: 45°03′32″N 0°20′10″W
- Country: France
- Region: Nouvelle-Aquitaine
- Department: Gironde
- Arrondissement: Blaye
- Canton: Le Nord-Gironde
- Intercommunality: Latitude Nord Gironde

Government
  - Mayor (2020–2026): Patrick Pelleton
- Area^{1}: 9.04 km^{2} (3.49 sq mi)
- Elevation: 40 m (130 ft)
- Highest elevation: 65 m (213 ft)
- Lowest elevation: 16 m (52 ft)
- Population (2023): 863
  - Density: 95.5/km^{2} (247/sq mi)
- Time zone: UTC+01:00 (CET)
  - Summer (DST): UTC+02:00 (CEST)
- INSEE/Postal code: 33266 /33620
- ^{1} French Land Register data, which excludes lakes, ponds, glaciers > 1 km^{2} (0.386 sq mi or 247 acres) and river estuaries.

Marcenais (French pronunciation: [maʁsənɛ]) is a commune in the Gironde department in Nouvelle-Aquitaine in southwestern France.

== Population ==
Historical population
Year	Pop.	±% p.a.
1968	389	—
1975	359	−1.14%
1982	522	+5.49%
1990	527	+0.12%
1999	595	+1.36%
2007	668	+1.46%
2012	726	+1.68%
2017	772	+1.24%
2023	863	+1.87%
Source: INSEE

== See also ==
- Communes of the Gironde department
