= Donnezac =

- Commune
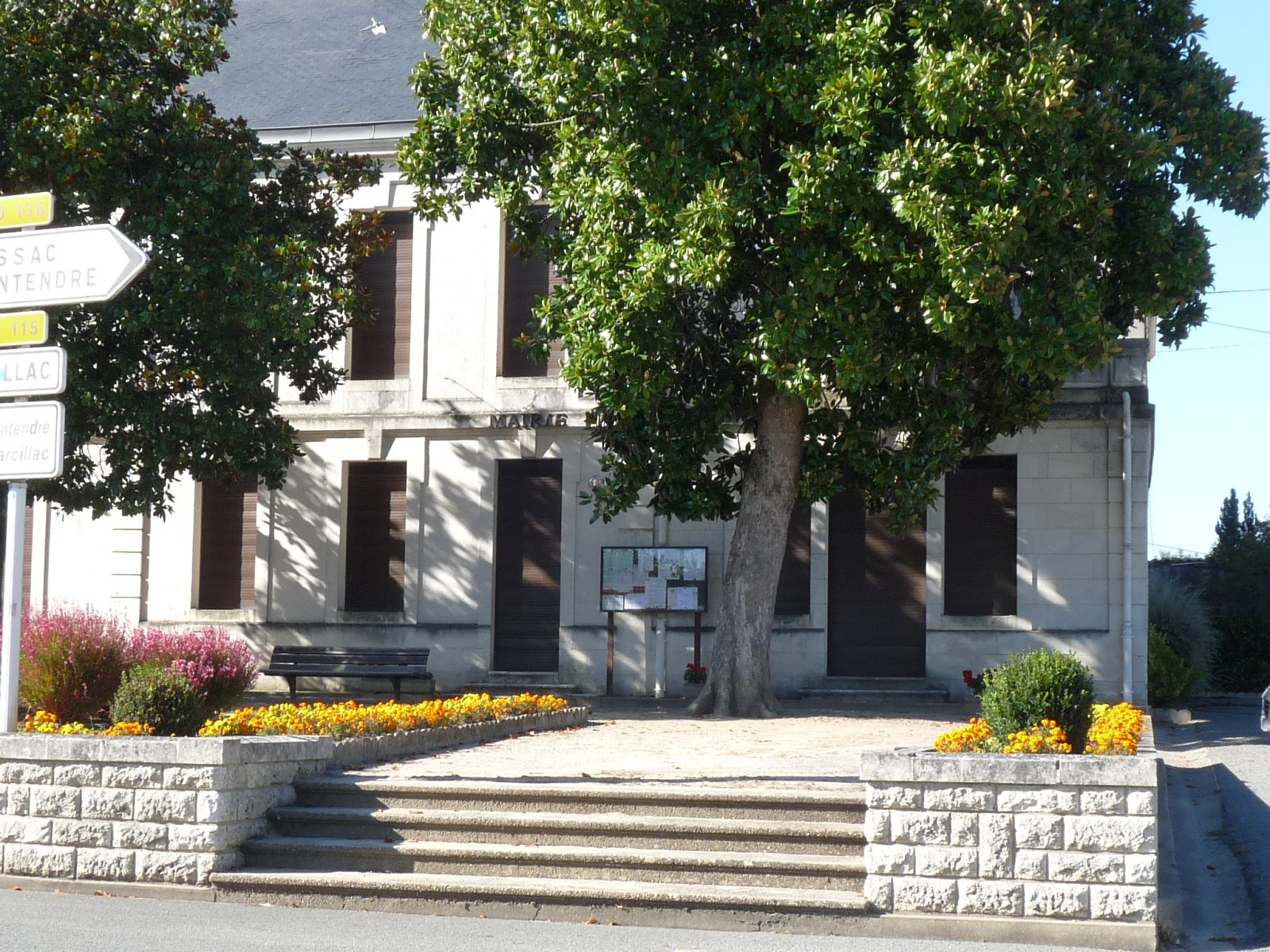
- The town hall in Donnezac
- Location of Donnezac
- Location within France Location within Nouvelle-Aquitaine
- Coordinates: 45°14′55″N 0°26′32″W
- Country: France
- Region: Nouvelle-Aquitaine
- Department: Gironde
- Arrondissement: Blaye
- Canton: Le Nord-Gironde

Government
  - Mayor (2020–2026): Jean-François Joyé
- Area^{1}: 35.75 km^{2} (13.80 sq mi)
- Elevation: 52 m (171 ft)
- Highest elevation: 82 m (269 ft)
- Lowest elevation: 23 m (75 ft)
- Population (2023): 926
  - Density: 25.9/km^{2} (67.1/sq mi)
- Time zone: UTC+01:00 (CET)
  - Summer (DST): UTC+02:00 (CEST)
- INSEE/Postal code: 33151 /33860
- ^{1} French Land Register data, which excludes lakes, ponds, glaciers > 1 km^{2} (0.386 sq mi or 247 acres) and river estuaries.

Donnezac (French pronunciation: [dɔnzak]) is a commune in the Gironde department in southwestern France.

== Population ==
Historical population
Year	Pop.	±% p.a.
1968	825	—
1975	763	−1.11%
1982	781	+0.33%
1990	780	−0.02%
1999	778	−0.03%
2007	824	+0.72%
2012	865	+0.98%
2017	899	+0.77%
2023	926	+0.49%
Source: INSEE

== See also ==
- Communes of the Gironde department
