= Saint-Vivien-de-Blaye =

- Commune
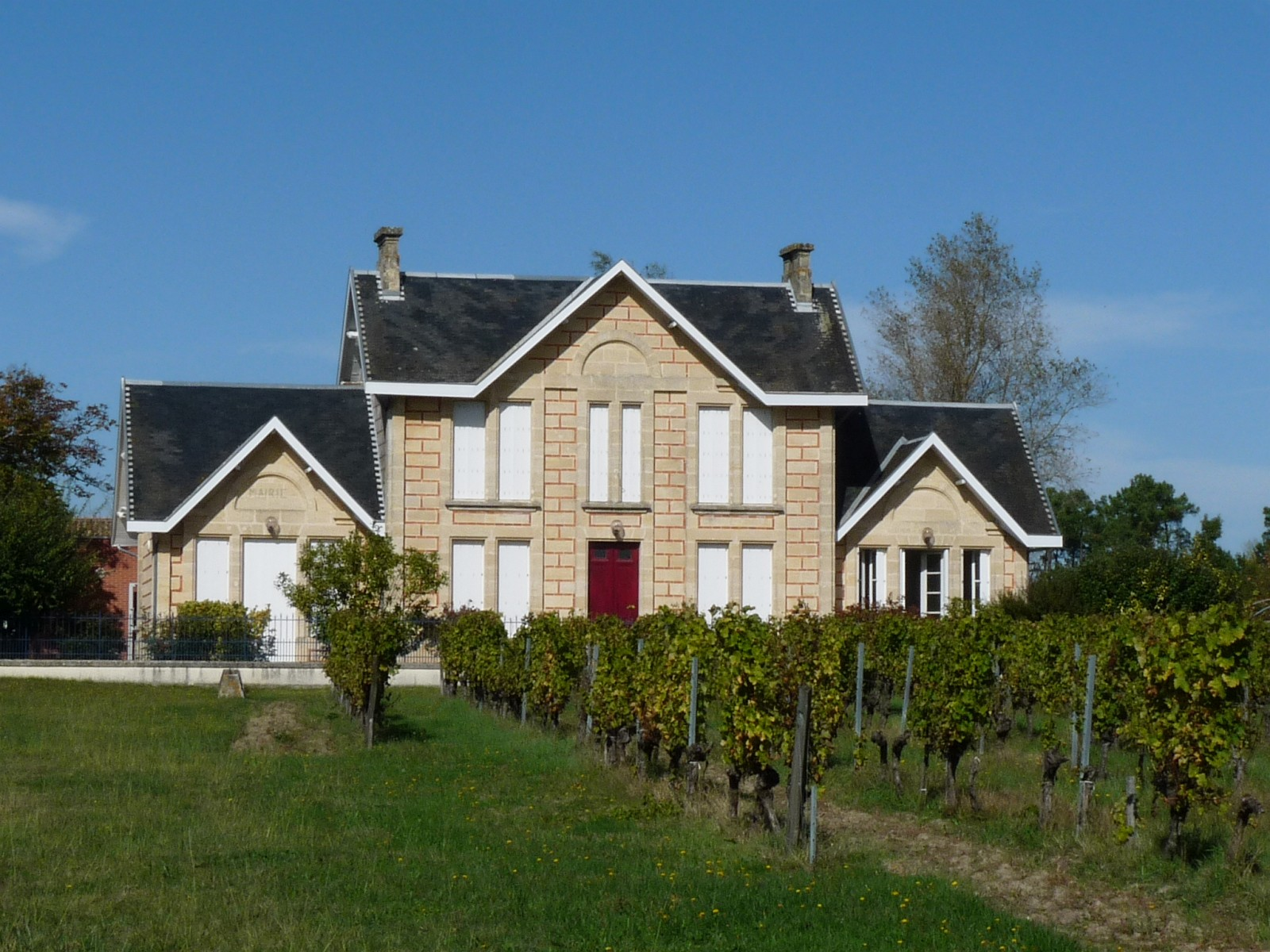
- The town hall in Saint-Vivien-de-Blaye

- Coat of arms
- Location of Saint-Vivien-de-Blaye
- Location within France Location within Nouvelle-Aquitaine
- Coordinates: 45°06′03″N 0°30′58″W
- Country: France
- Region: Nouvelle-Aquitaine
- Department: Gironde
- Arrondissement: Blaye
- Canton: Le Nord-Gironde
- Intercommunality: Latitude Nord Gironde

Government
  - Mayor (2020–2026): Jean-Pierre Domens
- Area^{1}: 5.69 km^{2} (2.20 sq mi)
- Elevation: 37 m (121 ft)
- Highest elevation: 51 m (167 ft)
- Lowest elevation: 8 m (26 ft)
- Population (2023): 358
  - Density: 62.9/km^{2} (163/sq mi)
- Time zone: UTC+01:00 (CET)
  - Summer (DST): UTC+02:00 (CEST)
- INSEE/Postal code: 33489 /33920
- ^{1} French Land Register data, which excludes lakes, ponds, glaciers > 1 km^{2} (0.386 sq mi or 247 acres) and river estuaries.

Saint-Vivien-de-Blaye (French pronunciation: [sɛ̃ vivjɛ̃ də blaj], literally Saint-Vivien of Blaye) is a commune in the Gironde department in Nouvelle-Aquitaine in southwestern France.

== Population ==
Historical population
Year	Pop.	±% p.a.
1968	268	—
1975	220	−2.78%
1982	307	+4.88%
1990	306	−0.04%
1999	321	+0.53%
2007	324	+0.12%
2012	386	+3.56%
2017	356	−1.61%
2023	358	+0.09%
Source: INSEE

== See also ==
- Communes of the Gironde department
