= Saint-Genès-de-Fronsac =

- Commune
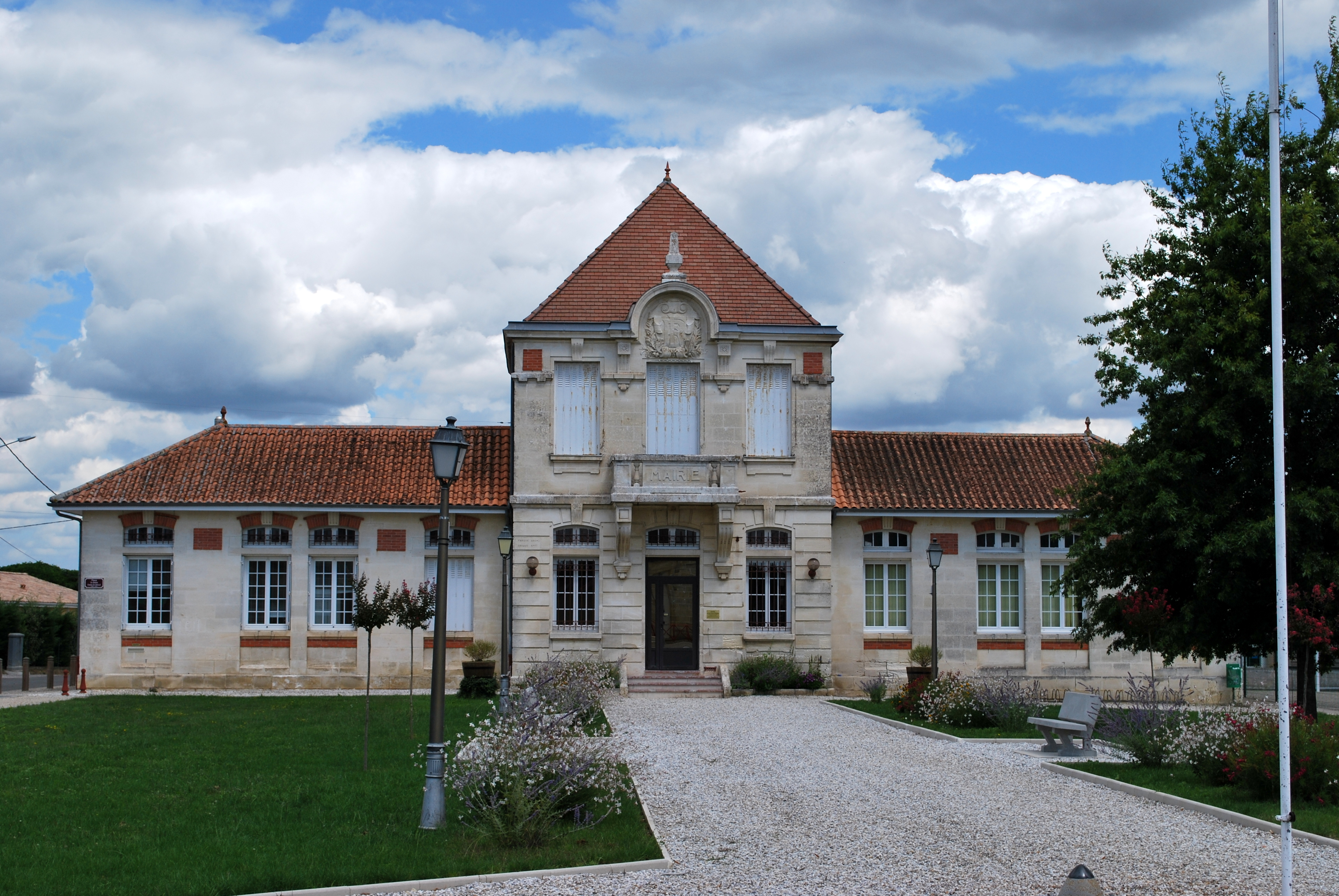
- The town hall in Saint-Genès-de-Fronsac
- Location of Saint-Genès-de-Fronsac
- Location within France Location within Nouvelle-Aquitaine
- Coordinates: 45°01′30″N 0°21′21″W
- Country: France
- Region: Nouvelle-Aquitaine
- Department: Gironde
- Arrondissement: Libourne
- Canton: Le Nord-Gironde
- Intercommunality: Fronsadais

Government
  - Mayor (2020–2026): Patrice Murat
- Area^{1}: 6.96 km^{2} (2.69 sq mi)
- Elevation: 70 m (230 ft)
- Highest elevation: 64 m (210 ft)
- Lowest elevation: 24 m (79 ft)
- Population (2023): 994
  - Density: 143/km^{2} (370/sq mi)
- Time zone: UTC+01:00 (CET)
  - Summer (DST): UTC+02:00 (CEST)
- INSEE/Postal code: 33407 /33240
- ^{1} French Land Register data, which excludes lakes, ponds, glaciers > 1 km^{2} (0.386 sq mi or 247 acres) and river estuaries.

Saint-Genès-de-Fronsac is a commune in the Gironde department in Nouvelle-Aquitaine in southwestern France.

== Population ==
Historical population
Year	Pop.	±% p.a.
1968	269	—
1975	267	−0.11%
1982	371	+4.81%
1990	550	+5.04%
1999	576	+0.51%
2007	695	+2.38%
2012	722	+0.77%
2017	794	+1.92%
2023	994	+3.82%
Source: INSEE

== See also ==
- Communes of the Gironde department
