= Civrac-de-Blaye =

- Commune
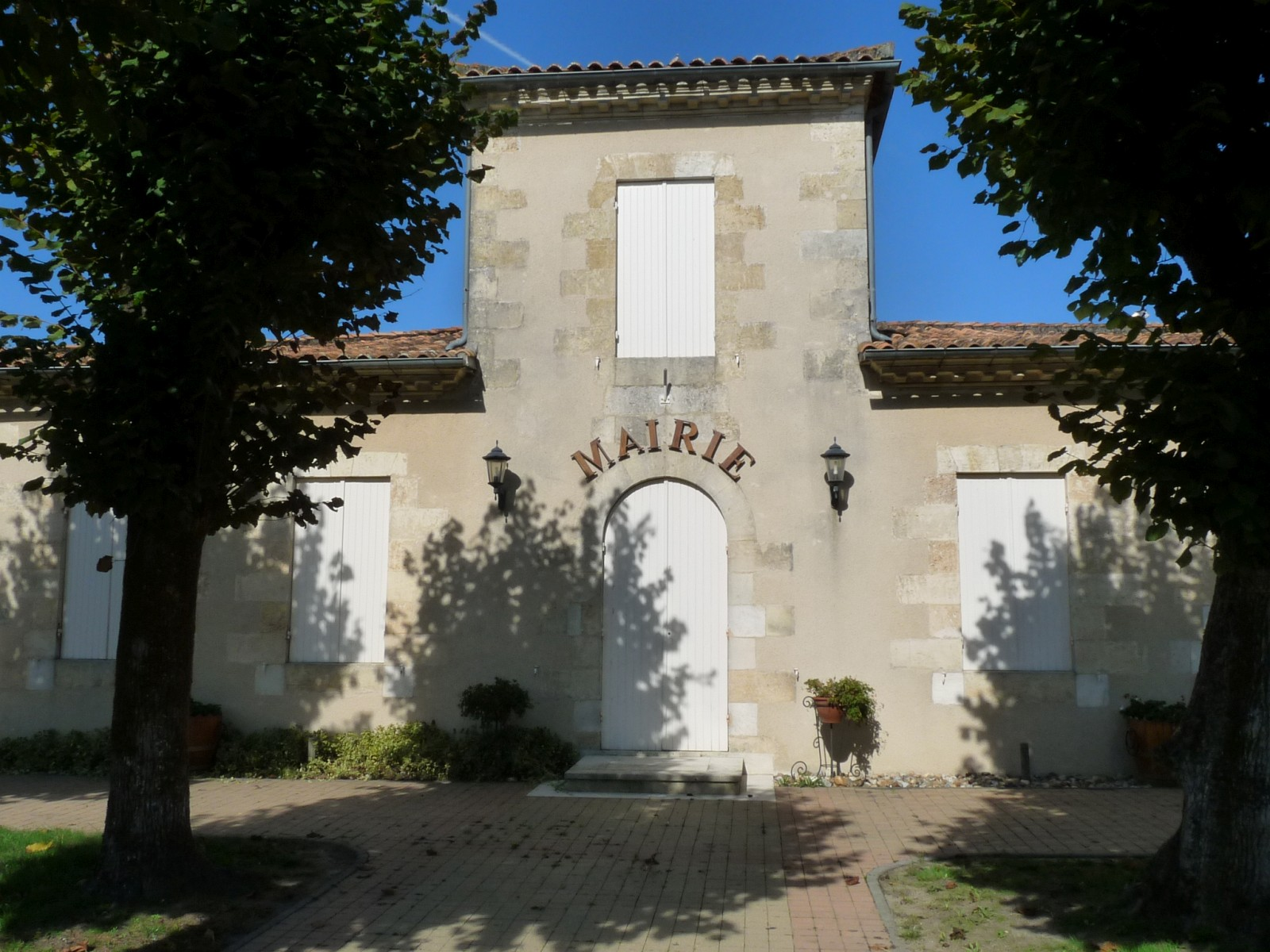
- The town hall in Civrac-de-Blaye
- Location of Civrac-de-Blaye
- Location within France Location within Nouvelle-Aquitaine
- Coordinates: 45°06′45″N 0°26′29″W
- Country: France
- Region: Nouvelle-Aquitaine
- Department: Gironde
- Arrondissement: Blaye
- Canton: Le Nord-Gironde
- Intercommunality: Latitude Nord Gironde

Government
  - Mayor (2020–2026): Florian Dumas
- Area^{1}: 13.25 km^{2} (5.12 sq mi)
- Elevation: 40 m (130 ft)
- Highest elevation: 51 m (167 ft)
- Lowest elevation: 8 m (26 ft)
- Population (2023): 795
  - Density: 60.0/km^{2} (155/sq mi)
- Time zone: UTC+01:00 (CET)
  - Summer (DST): UTC+02:00 (CEST)
- INSEE/Postal code: 33126 /33920
- ^{1} French Land Register data, which excludes lakes, ponds, glaciers > 1 km^{2} (0.386 sq mi or 247 acres) and river estuaries.

Civrac-de-Blaye (French pronunciation: [sivʁak də blaj], literally Civrac of Blaye) is a commune in the Gironde department in Nouvelle-Aquitaine in southwestern France.

== Population ==
Historical population
Year	Pop.	±% p.a.
1968	413	—
1975	382	−1.11%
1982	526	+4.68%
1990	603	+1.72%
1999	668	+1.14%
2007	778	+1.92%
2012	826	+1.20%
2017	857	+0.74%
2023	795	−1.24%
Source: INSEE

== See also ==
- Communes of the Gironde department
