= Cézac, Gironde =

Cézac
- Commune
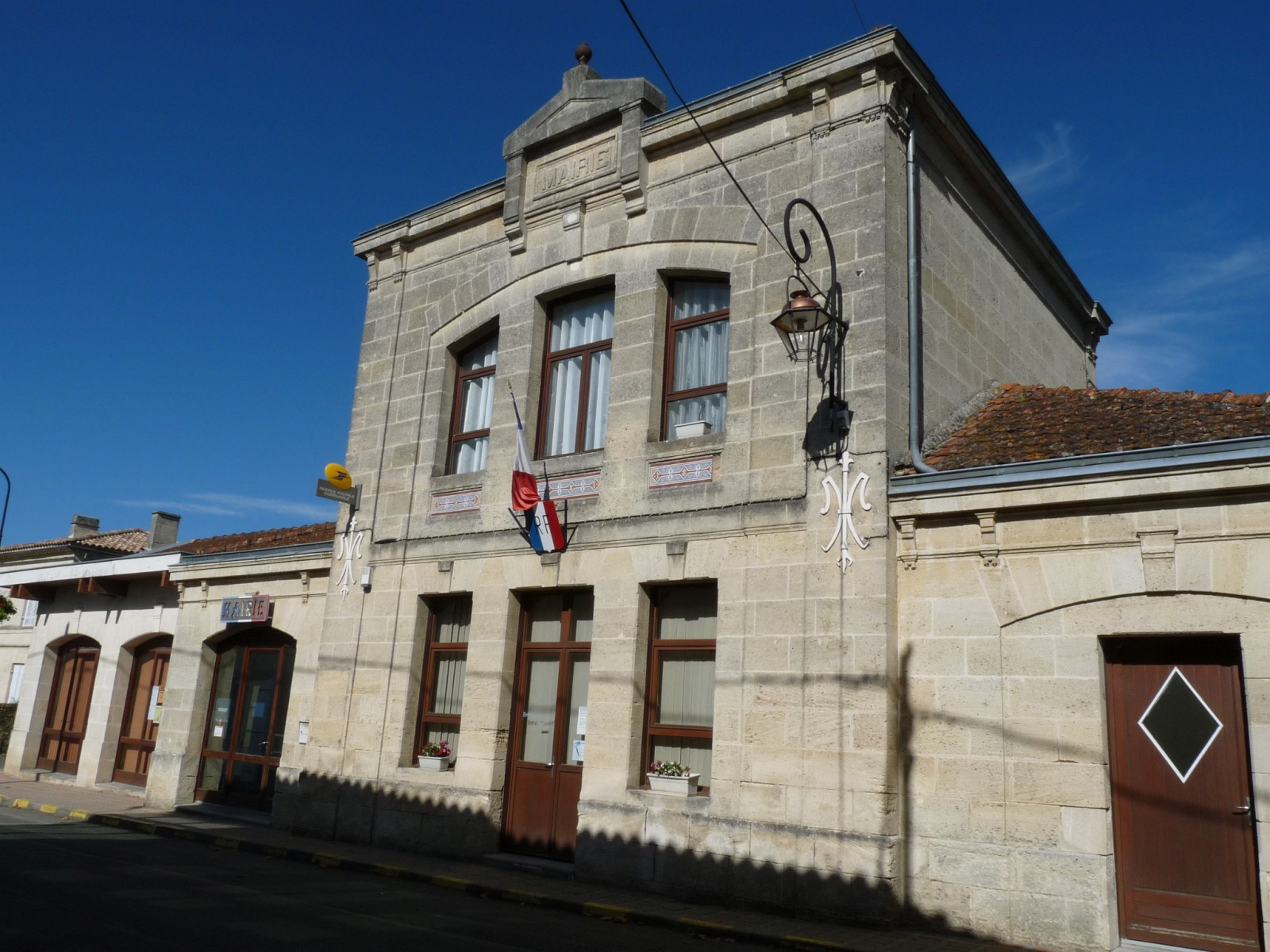
- The town hall in Cézac

- Coat of arms
- Location of Cézac
- Location within France Location within Nouvelle-Aquitaine
- Coordinates: 45°05′30″N 0°25′07″W
- Country: France
- Region: Nouvelle-Aquitaine
- Department: Gironde
- Arrondissement: Blaye
- Canton: Le Nord-Gironde
- Intercommunality: Latitude Nord Gironde

Government
  - Mayor (2020–2026): Nicole Porte
- Area^{1}: 19.16 km^{2} (7.40 sq mi)
- Elevation: 19 m (62 ft)
- Highest elevation: 76 m (249 ft)
- Lowest elevation: 2 m (6.6 ft)
- Population (2023): 2,727
  - Density: 142.3/km^{2} (368.6/sq mi)
- Time zone: UTC+01:00 (CET)
  - Summer (DST): UTC+02:00 (CEST)
- INSEE/Postal code: 33123 /33620
- ^{1} French Land Register data, which excludes lakes, ponds, glaciers > 1 km^{2} (0.386 sq mi or 247 acres) and river estuaries.

Cézac (French pronunciation: [sezak]) is a commune in the Gironde department in Nouvelle-Aquitaine in southwestern France. It was first mentioned in documents in 1274.

== Population ==
Historical population
Year	Pop.	±% p.a.
1968	1,074	—
1975	1,107	+0.43%
1982	1,366	+3.05%
1990	1,580	+1.84%
1999	1,762	+1.22%
2007	2,045	+1.88%
2012	2,434	+3.54%
2017	2,571	+1.10%
2023	2,727	+0.99%
Source: INSEE

== See also ==
- Communes of the Gironde department
