= Générac, Gironde =

Générac
- Commune
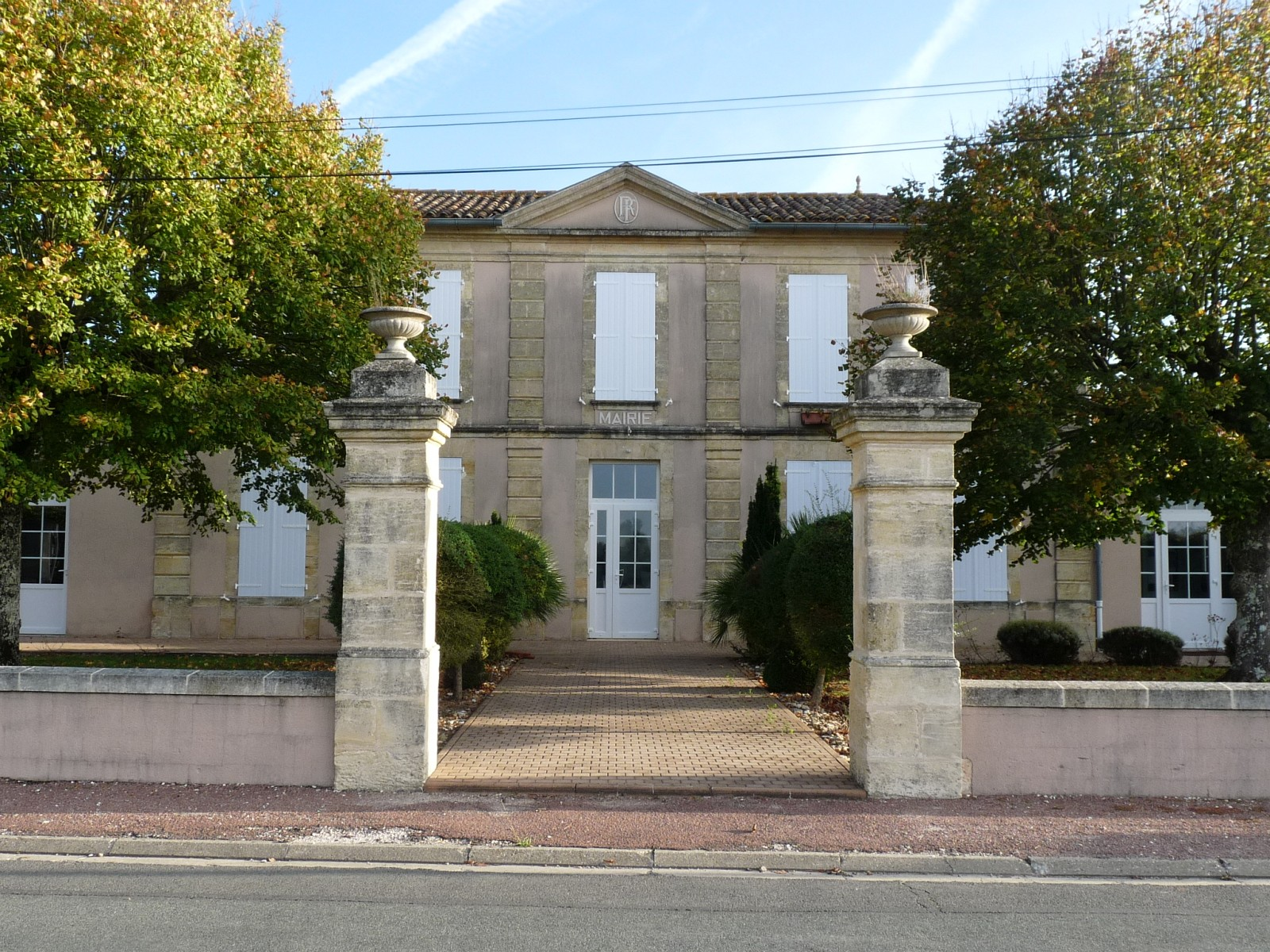
- Town hall
- Location of Générac
- Location within France Location within Nouvelle-Aquitaine
- Coordinates: 45°10′49″N 0°32′44″W
- Country: France
- Region: Nouvelle-Aquitaine
- Department: Gironde
- Arrondissement: Blaye
- Canton: Le Nord-Gironde

Government
  - Mayor (2023–2026): Philippe Dubau
- Area^{1}: 9.44 km^{2} (3.64 sq mi)
- Elevation: 44 m (144 ft)
- Highest elevation: 50 m (160 ft)
- Lowest elevation: 19 m (62 ft)
- Population (2023): 549
  - Density: 58.2/km^{2} (151/sq mi)
- Time zone: UTC+01:00 (CET)
  - Summer (DST): UTC+02:00 (CEST)
- INSEE/Postal code: 33184 /33920
- ^{1} French Land Register data, which excludes lakes, ponds, glaciers > 1 km^{2} (0.386 sq mi or 247 acres) and river estuaries.

Générac (French pronunciation: [ʒeneʁak]) is a commune in the Gironde department in southwestern France.

== Population ==
Historical population
| Year | Pop. | ±% p.a. |
|---|---|---|
| 1968 | 486 | — |
| 1975 | 438 | −1.47% |
| 1982 | 460 | +0.70% |
| 1990 | 465 | +0.14% |
| 1999 | 493 | +0.65% |
| 2007 | 572 | +1.88% |
| 2012 | 582 | +0.35% |
| 2017 | 541 | −1.45% |
| 2023 | 549 | +0.24% |
Source: INSEE

== See also ==
- Communes of the Gironde department
