= County of Saintonge =

French province (1371–1790)

County of Saintonge Comté de Saintonge (French) Comtaé de Séntunjhe (Poitevin-Saintongeais)
- 1371–1790
- Flag Coat of arms

- Location of Saintonge within the Kingdom of France in 1789
- Capital: Saintes
- Demonym: Saintongeais, Saintongeais, Saintongeaise, Saintongeaises
- Government
  - Type: Province
- King of France
  - First: Charles V
  - Last: Louis XVI
- Governor of Saintonge
  - First: Jean II d'Angennes, Seigneur de Rambouillet
  - Last: Duke of Uzès
- Historical era: Middle Ages / Early Modern
  - Integrated into Kingdom of France: 1371
  - Decree dividing France into departments: 1790
Preceded by
| Duchy of Aquitaine |
Succeeded by
| Deux-Sèvres |
| Charente-Maritime |
| Charente |
- Today part of: France

Saintonge (French pronunciation: [sɛ̃tɔ̃ʒ]; Poitevin-Saintongeais: Séntunjhe), historically spelled Xaintonge and Xainctonge, is a former province of France located on the west central Atlantic coast. The capital city was Saintes (Xaintes, Xainctes). Other principal towns include Saint-Jean-d'Angély, Jonzac, Frontenay-Rohan-Rohan, Royan, Marennes, Pons, and Barbezieux-Saint-Hilaire.

== Background ==
The borders of the province shifted slightly through history. Some mapmakers, such as Nicolas Sanson (1650), Johannes Blaeu (1662), and Bernard Antoine Jaillot (1733), show the province extending into Cognac, traditionally part of Angoumois, and to the parishes of Braud-et-Saint-Louis and Étauliers, part of the Pays Gabay on the right bank of the Gironde River.

In 1790, during the French Revolution, Saintonge became part of Charente-Inférieure, one of the 83 departments organized by the new government. This was renamed as Charente-Maritime in 1941, during World War II.

Today, four-fifths of the historical Saintonge province is within the modern département of Charente-Maritime. Most of the other fifth is in Charente. A small section extends north into Deux-Sèvres; all three departments are within the administrative region of Nouvelle-Aquitaine.

== History ==
Modern map showing the extent of the historical Saintonge province.

The province derives its name from the Santones, an ancient Gallic tribe that once inhabited the area. They were one of the numerous Celtic peoples in Europe before the rise of the Roman Empire. During antiquity, Saintonge was part of the Roman province of Gallia Aquitania, and Saintes became its first capital.

The region then fell under the control of the kings and dukes of Aquitaine, the counts of Anjou, then the counts of Poitiers, before becoming integrated for centuries in the new Duchy of Aquitaine. Occupying the frontier between Capetian and Plantagenet-controlled areas during the late Middle Ages, between 1152 and 1451, it was the site of constant struggles between lords torn between their allegiance to Anglo-Aquitaine and those linked to Paris.

Saintonge was primarily attached to Anglo-Aquitaine until the mid-fourteenth century. However, errors by Henry of Grosmont, 1st Duke of Lancaster and Edward, the Black Prince gradually contributed to weakening English power. In 1451 the province came under the control of the King of France, Charles VII, "the Victorious".

Saintonge was the birthplace of French explorer Jean Allefonsce (or Alfonse) in 1484, and of Samuel de Champlain in 1574. The latter man explored the New World and founded Quebec in North America (now Canada). The town was also one of the centers of French Huguenots, who formed a center of Protestant belief in Southwest France.

The distinctive Saintongeais dialect (patouê saintonjhouê, jhabrail) was once spoken throughout Saintonge, as well as in the provinces of Aunis and Angoumois.

The region is famous for its grapes, which are used to produce cognac and Pineau des Charentes.

== Government ==
Following the governmental reforms of 1773, the County of Saintonge formed part of the General Government of Saintonge and Angoumois (Gouvernement-Général de Saintonge et Angoumois).

Following the decree dividing France into departments announced on 22 December 1789, the County of Saintonge was disestablished. The majority of the county formed the majority of the new Department of Charente-Maritime, while the south-eastern portion formed part of the Department of Charente, and the northernmost part formed part of the Department of Deux-Sevrès.

== See also ==
- Saintonge Regiment
