= Saint-Ciers =

Saint-Ciers may refer to the following places in France:

- Saint-Ciers-sur-Bonnieure, in the Charente département
- Saint-Ciers-Champagne, in the Charente-Maritime département
- Saint-Ciers-du-Taillon, in the Charente-Maritime département
- Saint-Ciers-d'Abzac, in the Gironde département
- Saint-Ciers-de-Canesse, in the Gironde département
- Saint-Ciers-sur-Gironde, in the Gironde département
