= Tauriac =

Tauriac may refer to the following places in France:

- Tauriac, Gironde, a commune in the Gironde department
- Tauriac, Lot, a commune in the Lot department
- Tauriac, Tarn, a commune in the Tarn department
