= Reignac =

Reignac may refer to:

- Reignac, Charente, France
- Reignac, Gironde, France
