= Lansac, Gironde =

Lansac
- Commune
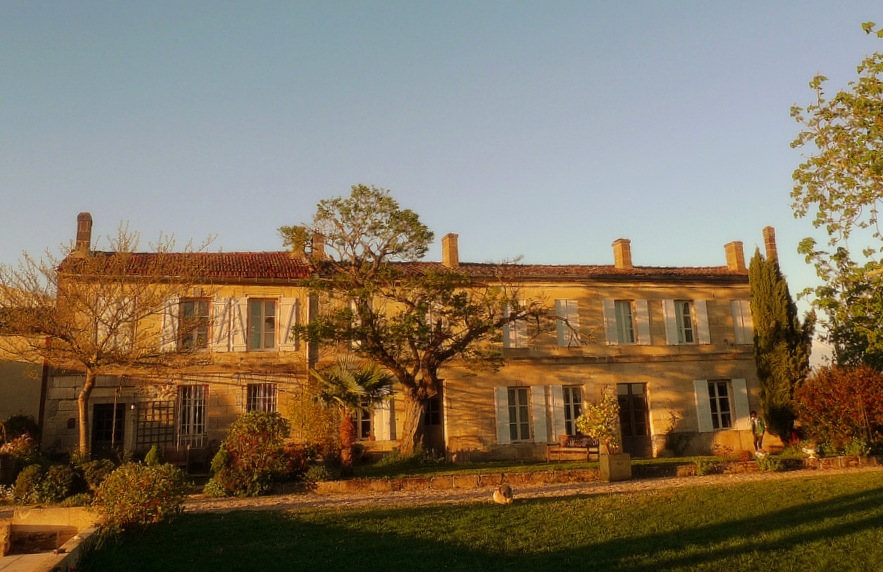
- The Chateau Martinat in Lansac

- Coat of arms
- Location of Lansac
- Location within France Location within Nouvelle-Aquitaine
- Coordinates: 45°03′44″N 0°32′27″W
- Country: France
- Region: Nouvelle-Aquitaine
- Department: Gironde
- Arrondissement: Blaye
- Canton: L'Estuaire
- Intercommunality: Grand Cubzaguais

Government
  - Mayor (2020–2026): Éric Pouchard
- Area^{1}: 6 km^{2} (2.3 sq mi)
- Elevation: 69 m (226 ft)
- Highest elevation: 68 m (223 ft)
- Lowest elevation: 7 m (23 ft)
- Population (2023): 663
  - Density: 110/km^{2} (290/sq mi)
- Time zone: UTC+01:00 (CET)
  - Summer (DST): UTC+02:00 (CEST)
- INSEE/Postal code: 33228 /33710
- ^{1} French Land Register data, which excludes lakes, ponds, glaciers > 1 km^{2} (0.386 sq mi or 247 acres) and river estuaries.

Lansac (French pronunciation: [lɑ̃sak]; Occitan: Lançac) is a commune in the Gironde department in Nouvelle-Aquitaine in southwestern France.

== Population ==
Historical population
Year	Pop.	±% p.a.
1968	599	—
1975	631	+0.75%
1982	606	−0.58%
1990	610	+0.08%
1999	639	+0.52%
2007	604	−0.70%
2012	709	+3.26%
2017	739	+0.83%
2023	663	−1.79%
Source: INSEE

== See also ==
- Communes of the Gironde department
