= Villeneuve, Gironde =

Villeneuve
- Commune
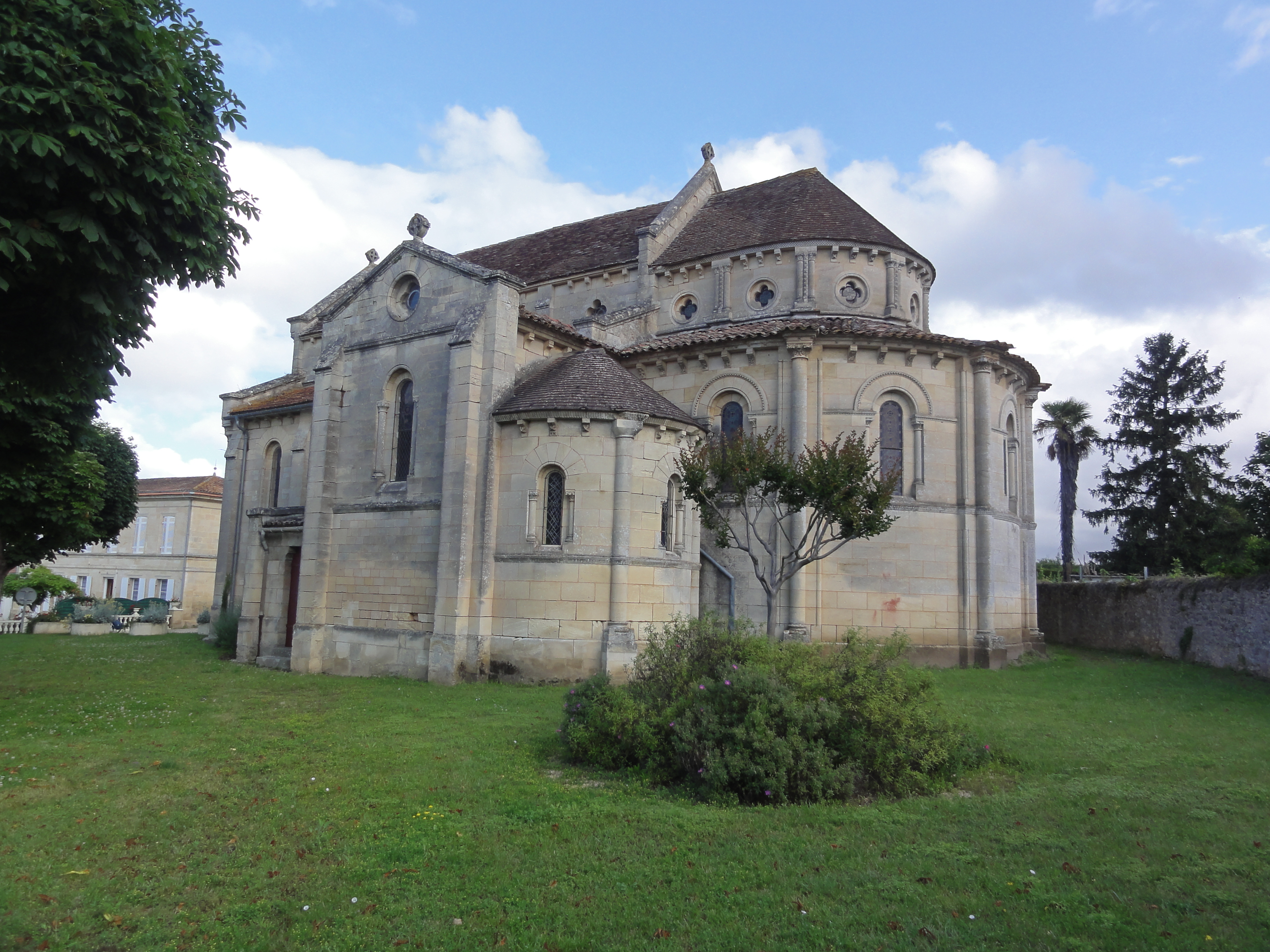
- The church in Villeneuve
- Location of Villeneuve
- Location within France Location within Nouvelle-Aquitaine
- Coordinates: 45°05′04″N 0°37′36″W
- Country: France
- Region: Nouvelle-Aquitaine
- Department: Gironde
- Arrondissement: Blaye
- Canton: L'Estuaire
- Intercommunality: Blaye

Government
  - Mayor (2020–2026): Catherine Verges
- Area^{1}: 4.63 km^{2} (1.79 sq mi)
- Elevation: 5 m (16 ft)
- Highest elevation: 51 m (167 ft)
- Lowest elevation: 1 m (3.3 ft)
- Population (2023): 407
  - Density: 87.9/km^{2} (228/sq mi)
- Time zone: UTC+01:00 (CET)
  - Summer (DST): UTC+02:00 (CEST)
- INSEE/Postal code: 33551 /33710
- ^{1} French Land Register data, which excludes lakes, ponds, glaciers > 1 km^{2} (0.386 sq mi or 247 acres) and river estuaries.

Villeneuve (French pronunciation: [vilnœv]; Occitan: Vilanuèva) is a commune in the Gironde department, Nouvelle-Aquitaine, southwestern France.

== Population ==
Historical population
Year	Pop.	±% p.a.
1968	377	—
1975	377	+0.00%
1982	372	−0.19%
1990	314	−2.10%
1999	364	+1.66%
2007	374	+0.34%
2012	395	+1.10%
2017	395	+0.00%
2023	407	+0.50%
Source: INSEE

== See also ==
- Communes of the Gironde department
