= Pleine-Selve, Gironde =

Pleine-Selve
- Commune
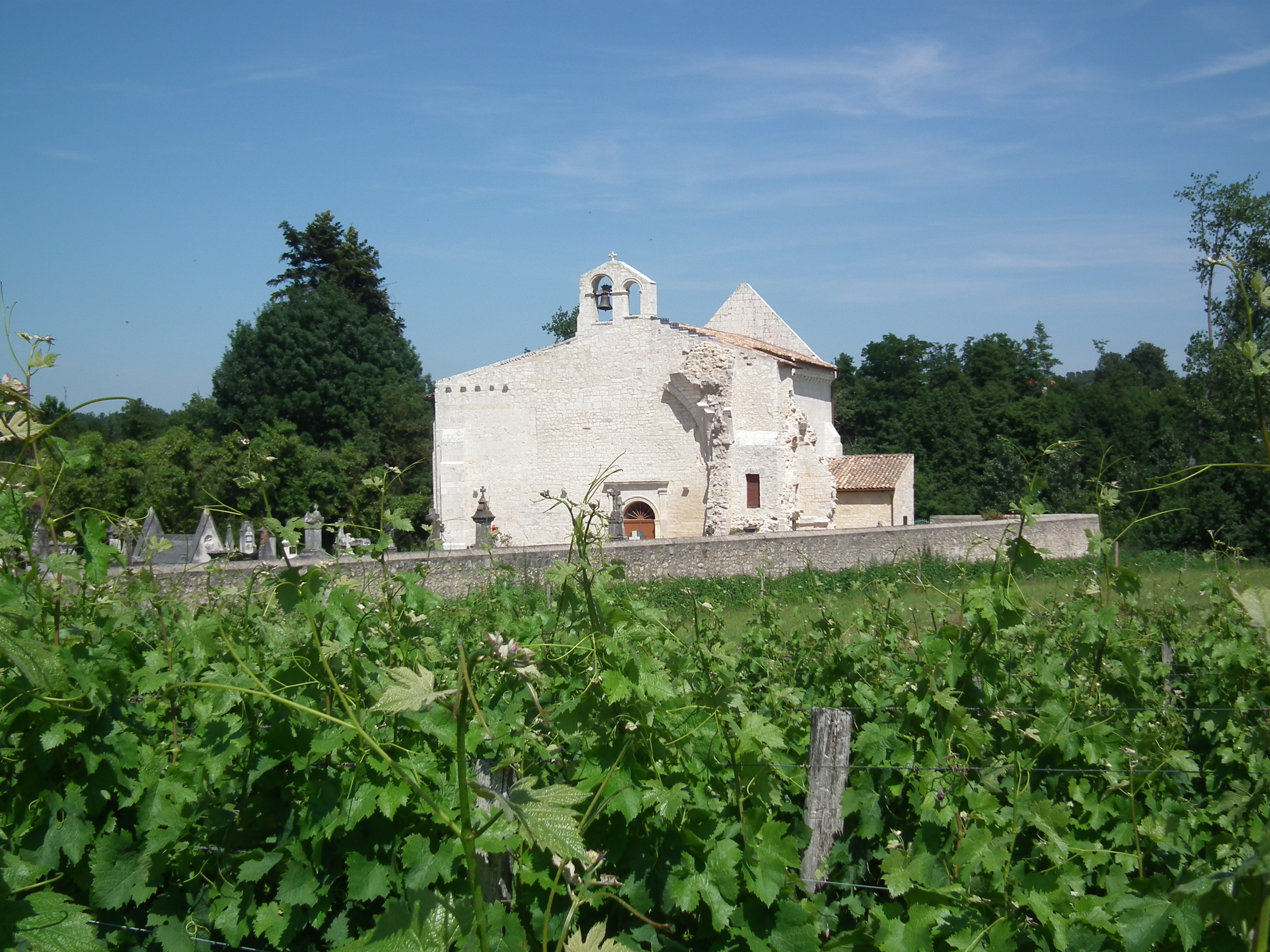
- Ruins of the abbey
- Location of Pleine-Selve
- Location within France Location within Nouvelle-Aquitaine
- Coordinates: 45°19′42″N 0°34′29″W
- Country: France
- Region: Nouvelle-Aquitaine
- Department: Gironde
- Arrondissement: Blaye
- Canton: L'Estuaire
- Intercommunality: Estuaire

Government
  - Mayor (2020–2026): Jean-Jacques Laisné
- Area^{1}: 4.23 km^{2} (1.63 sq mi)
- Elevation: 42 m (138 ft)
- Highest elevation: 90 m (300 ft)
- Lowest elevation: 29 m (95 ft)
- Population (2023): 223
  - Density: 52.7/km^{2} (137/sq mi)
- Time zone: UTC+01:00 (CET)
  - Summer (DST): UTC+02:00 (CEST)
- INSEE/Postal code: 33326 /33820
- ^{1} French Land Register data, which excludes lakes, ponds, glaciers > 1 km^{2} (0.386 sq mi or 247 acres) and river estuaries.

Pleine-Selve (French pronunciation: [plɛn sɛlv]; Occitan: Encegada-Selva) is a commune in the Gironde department in Nouvelle-Aquitaine in southwestern France.

== Population ==
Historical population
Year	Pop.	±% p.a.
1968	268	—
1975	237	−1.74%
1982	235	−0.12%
1990	191	−2.56%
1999	192	+0.06%
2007	210	+1.13%
2012	221	+1.03%
2017	219	−0.18%
2023	223	+0.30%
Source: INSEE

== See also ==
- Communes of the Gironde department
