= Cars, Gironde =

Cars
- Commune
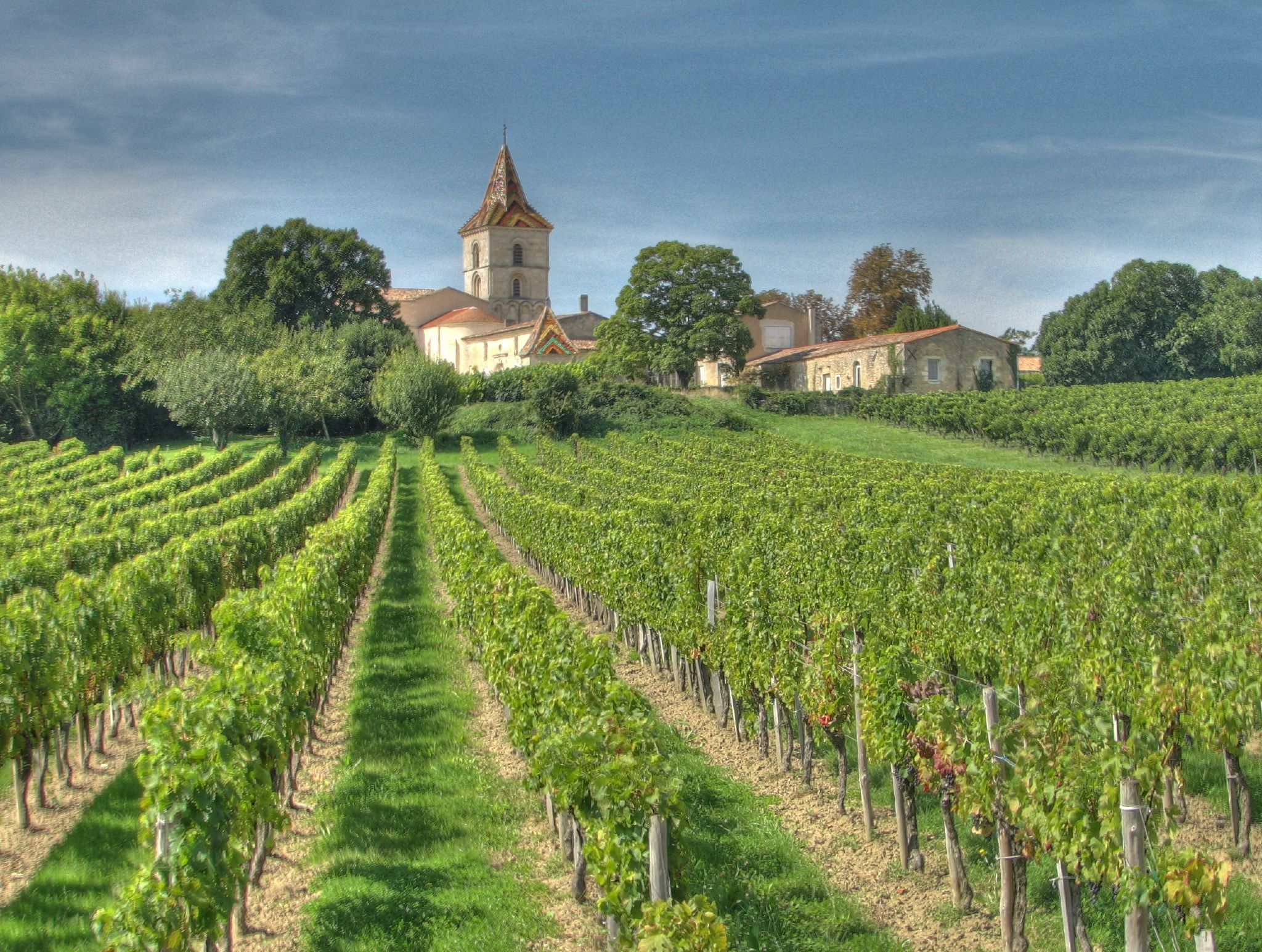
- The vineyards and church in Cars
- Location of Cars
- Location within France Location within Nouvelle-Aquitaine
- Coordinates: 45°07′45″N 0°37′06″W
- Country: France
- Region: Nouvelle-Aquitaine
- Department: Gironde
- Arrondissement: Blaye
- Canton: L'Estuaire

Government
  - Mayor (2020–2026): Xavier Zorrilla
- Area^{1}: 11.1 km^{2} (4.3 sq mi)
- Elevation: 43 m (141 ft)
- Highest elevation: 71 m (233 ft)
- Lowest elevation: 17 m (56 ft)
- Population (2023): 1,227
  - Density: 111/km^{2} (286/sq mi)
- Time zone: UTC+01:00 (CET)
  - Summer (DST): UTC+02:00 (CEST)
- INSEE/Postal code: 33100 /33390
- ^{1} French Land Register data, which excludes lakes, ponds, glaciers > 1 km^{2} (0.386 sq mi or 247 acres) and river estuaries.

Cars (Occitan: Còps) is a commune in the Gironde department in Nouvelle-Aquitaine in southwestern France.

== Population ==
Historical population
Year	Pop.	±% p.a.
1968	1,255	—
1975	1,178	−0.90%
1982	1,191	+0.16%
1990	1,186	−0.05%
1999	1,189	+0.03%
2007	1,173	−0.17%
2012	1,161	−0.21%
2017	1,187	+0.44%
2023	1,227	+0.55%
Source: INSEE

== Geography ==
Cars is located in the Blaye arrondissement near the intersection of Routes D133 and D937, about 4 km east of Blaye on the Gironde River.

== See also ==
- Communes of the Gironde department
