= Mazion =

- Commune
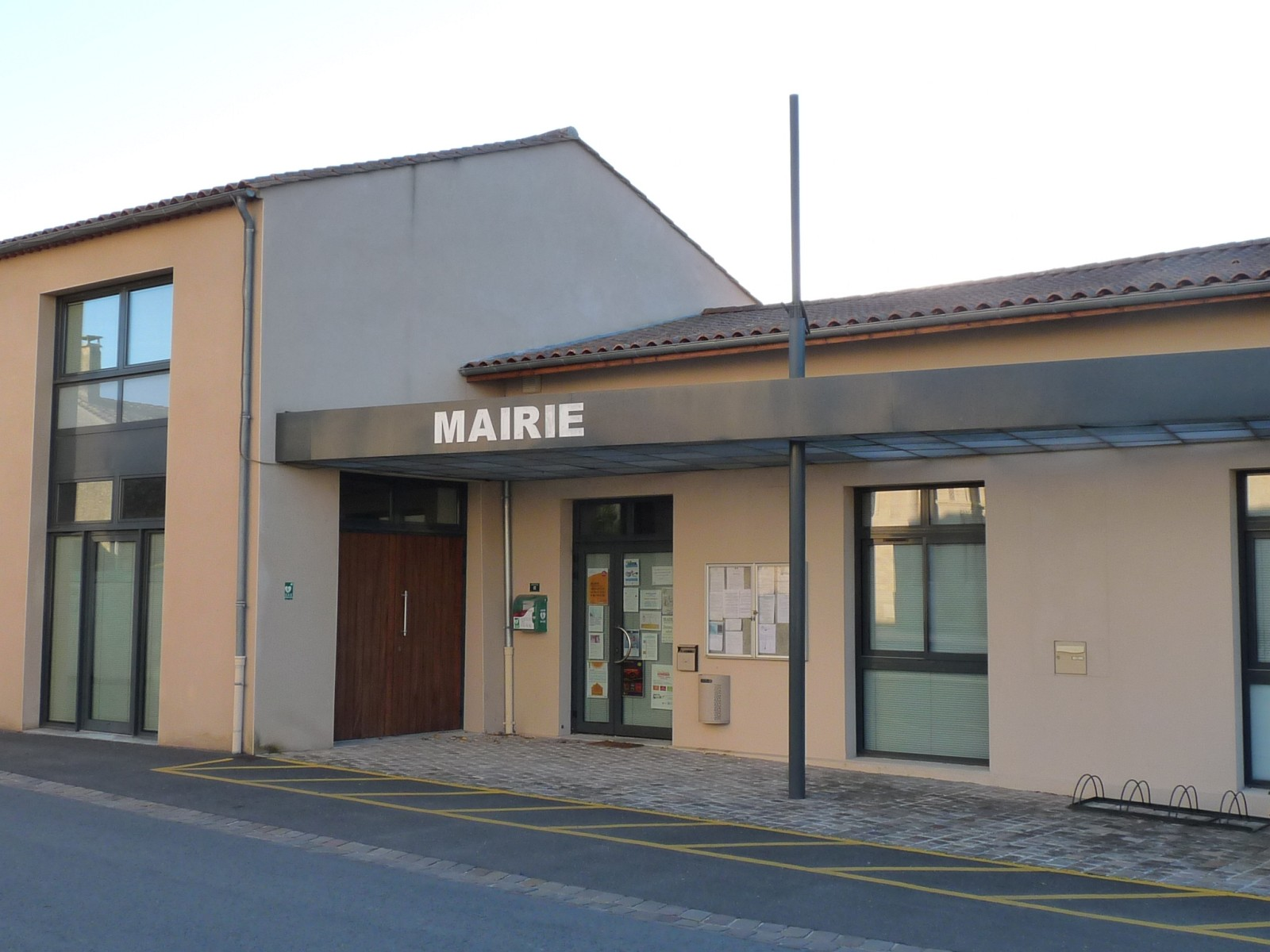
- The town hall in Mazion
- Location of Mazion
- Location within France Location within Nouvelle-Aquitaine
- Coordinates: 45°09′47″N 0°36′48″W
- Country: France
- Region: Nouvelle-Aquitaine
- Department: Gironde
- Arrondissement: Blaye
- Canton: L'Estuaire
- Intercommunality: l'Estuaire

Government
  - Mayor (2020–2026): Maryse Chasseloup
- Area^{1}: 3.71 km^{2} (1.43 sq mi)
- Elevation: 34 m (112 ft)
- Highest elevation: 34 m (112 ft)
- Lowest elevation: 9 m (30 ft)
- Population (2023): 537
  - Density: 145/km^{2} (375/sq mi)
- Time zone: UTC+01:00 (CET)
  - Summer (DST): UTC+02:00 (CEST)
- INSEE/Postal code: 33280 /33390
- ^{1} French Land Register data, which excludes lakes, ponds, glaciers > 1 km^{2} (0.386 sq mi or 247 acres) and river estuaries.

Mazion (French pronunciation: [mazjɔ̃]) is a commune in the Gironde department in Nouvelle-Aquitaine in southwestern France.

== Population ==
Historical population
Year	Pop.	±% p.a.
1968	354	—
1975	416	+2.33%
1982	429	+0.44%
1990	402	−0.81%
1999	395	−0.19%
2007	471	+2.22%
2012	522	+2.08%
2017	525	+0.11%
2023	537	+0.38%
Source: INSEE

== See also ==
- Communes of the Gironde department
