= Plassac, Gironde =

Plassac
- Commune
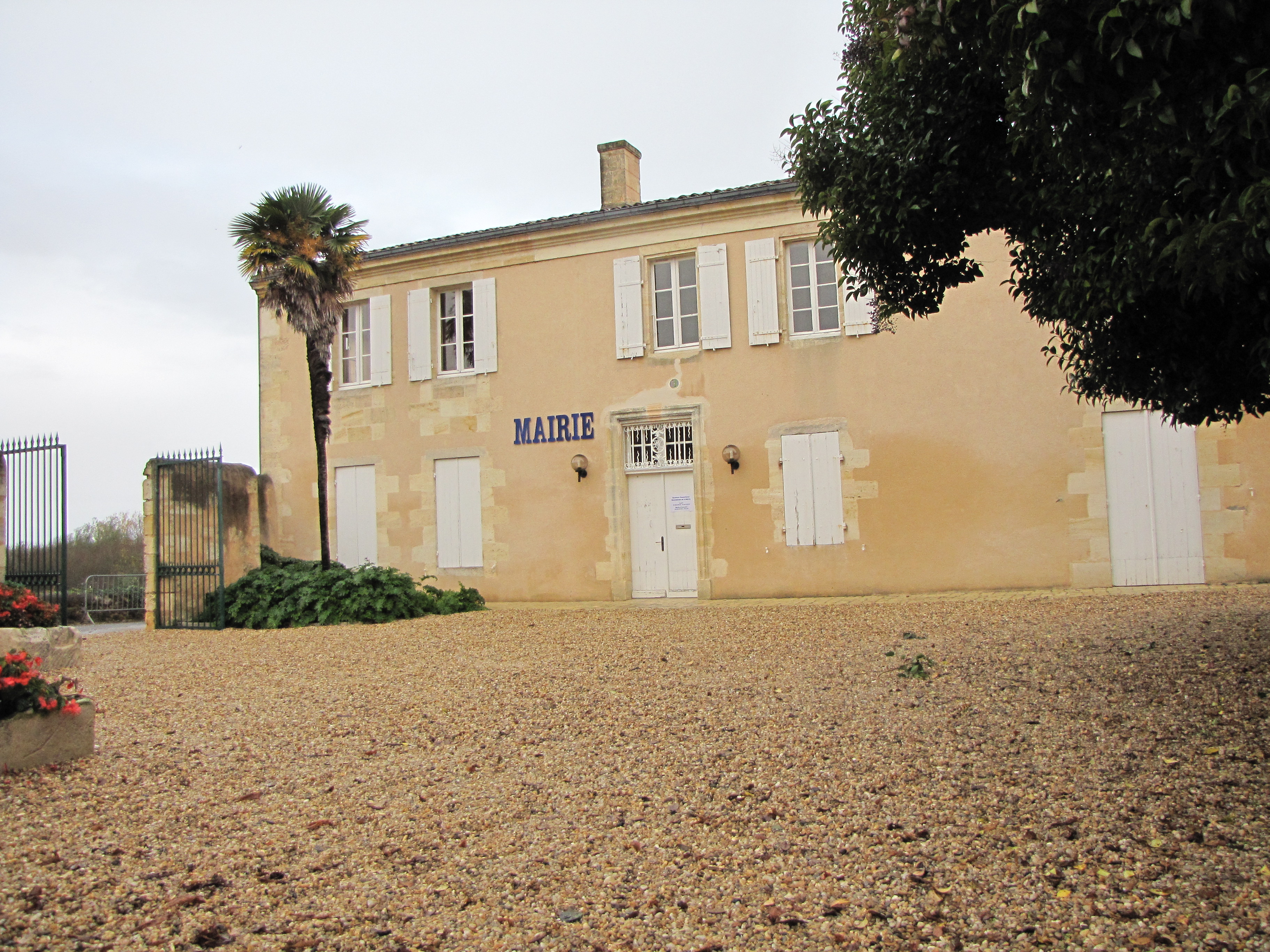
- The town hall in Plassac

- Coat of arms
- Location of Plassac
- Location within France Location within Nouvelle-Aquitaine
- Coordinates: 45°06′16″N 0°38′45″W
- Country: France
- Region: Nouvelle-Aquitaine
- Department: Gironde
- Arrondissement: Blaye
- Canton: L'Estuaire
- Intercommunality: Blaye

Government
  - Mayor (2020–2026): Jean-Louis Bernard
- Area^{1}: 7.12 km^{2} (2.75 sq mi)
- Elevation: 20 m (66 ft)
- Highest elevation: 79 m (259 ft)
- Lowest elevation: 0 m (0 ft)
- Population (2023): 924
  - Density: 130/km^{2} (336/sq mi)
- Time zone: UTC+01:00 (CET)
  - Summer (DST): UTC+02:00 (CEST)
- INSEE/Postal code: 33325 /33390
- ^{1} French Land Register data, which excludes lakes, ponds, glaciers > 1 km^{2} (0.386 sq mi or 247 acres) and river estuaries.

Plassac (French pronunciation: [plasak]) is a commune in the Gironde department in Nouvelle-Aquitaine in southwestern France.

== Population ==
Historical population
Year	Pop.	±% p.a.
1968	853	—
1975	901	+0.79%
1982	956	+0.85%
1990	964	+0.10%
1999	913	−0.60%
2007	928	+0.20%
2012	870	−1.28%
2017	885	+0.34%
2023	924	+0.72%
Source: INSEE

== See also ==
- Communes of the Gironde department
