= Teuillac =

- Commune
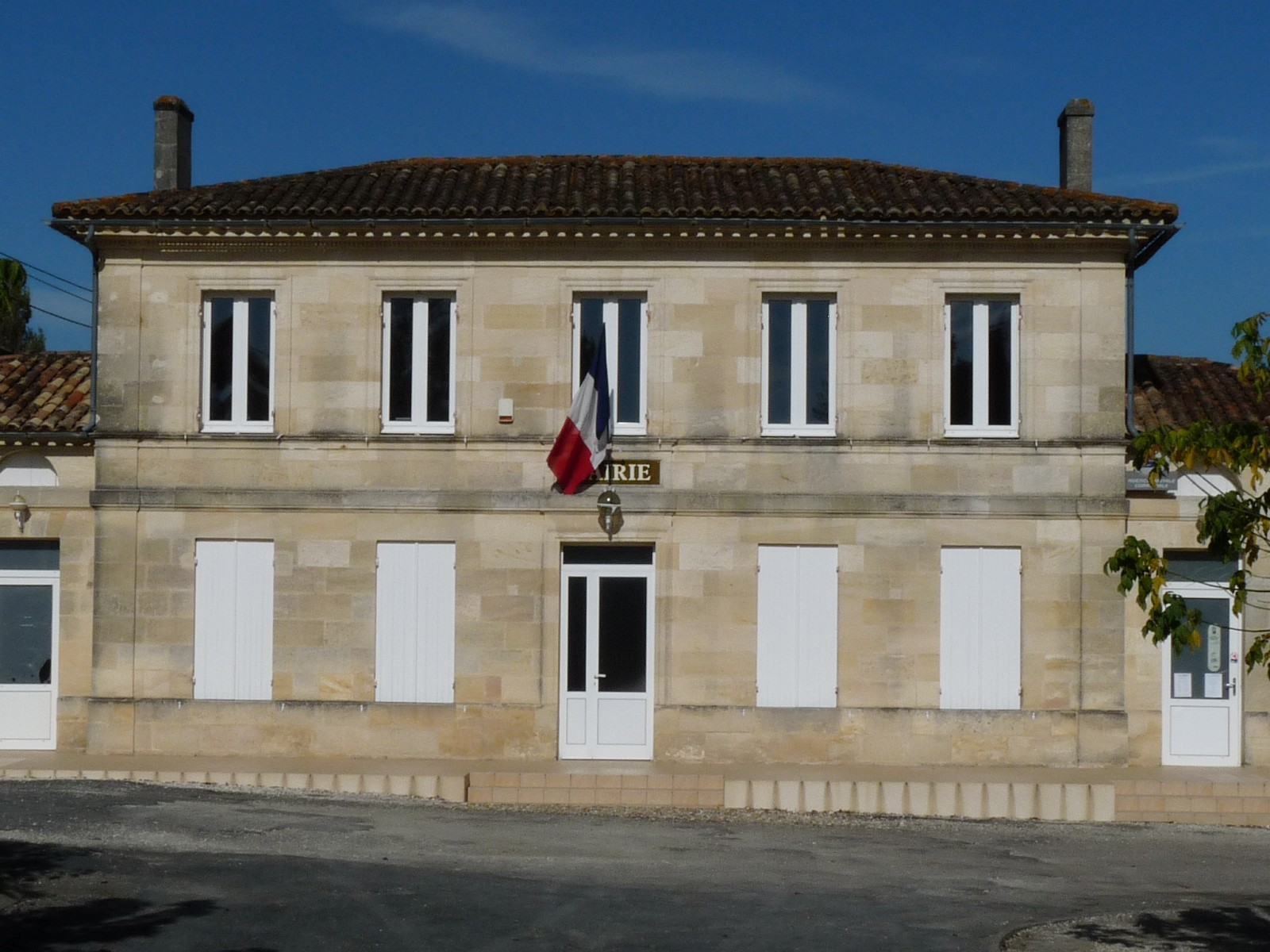
- The town hall in Teuillac
- Location of Teuillac
- Location within France Location within Nouvelle-Aquitaine
- Coordinates: 45°05′36″N 0°32′48″W
- Country: France
- Region: Nouvelle-Aquitaine
- Department: Gironde
- Arrondissement: Blaye
- Canton: L'Estuaire
- Intercommunality: Grand Cubzaguais

Government
  - Mayor (2020–2026): Jean-Franck Blanc
- Area^{1}: 7.15 km^{2} (2.76 sq mi)
- Elevation: 20 m (66 ft)
- Highest elevation: 86 m (282 ft)
- Lowest elevation: 22 m (72 ft)
- Population (2023): 884
  - Density: 124/km^{2} (320/sq mi)
- Time zone: UTC+01:00 (CET)
  - Summer (DST): UTC+02:00 (CEST)
- INSEE/Postal code: 33530 /33710
- ^{1} French Land Register data, which excludes lakes, ponds, glaciers > 1 km^{2} (0.386 sq mi or 247 acres) and river estuaries.

Teuillac (French pronunciation: [tœjak]) is a commune in the Gironde department in Nouvelle-Aquitaine in southwestern France.

== Population ==
Historical population
Year	Pop.	±% p.a.
1968	480	—
1975	485	+0.15%
1982	705	+5.49%
1990	689	−0.29%
1999	665	−0.39%
2007	716	+0.93%
2012	875	+4.09%
2017	880	+0.11%
2023	884	+0.08%
Source: INSEE

== See also ==
- Communes of the Gironde department
