= Comps, Gironde =

Comps
- Commune
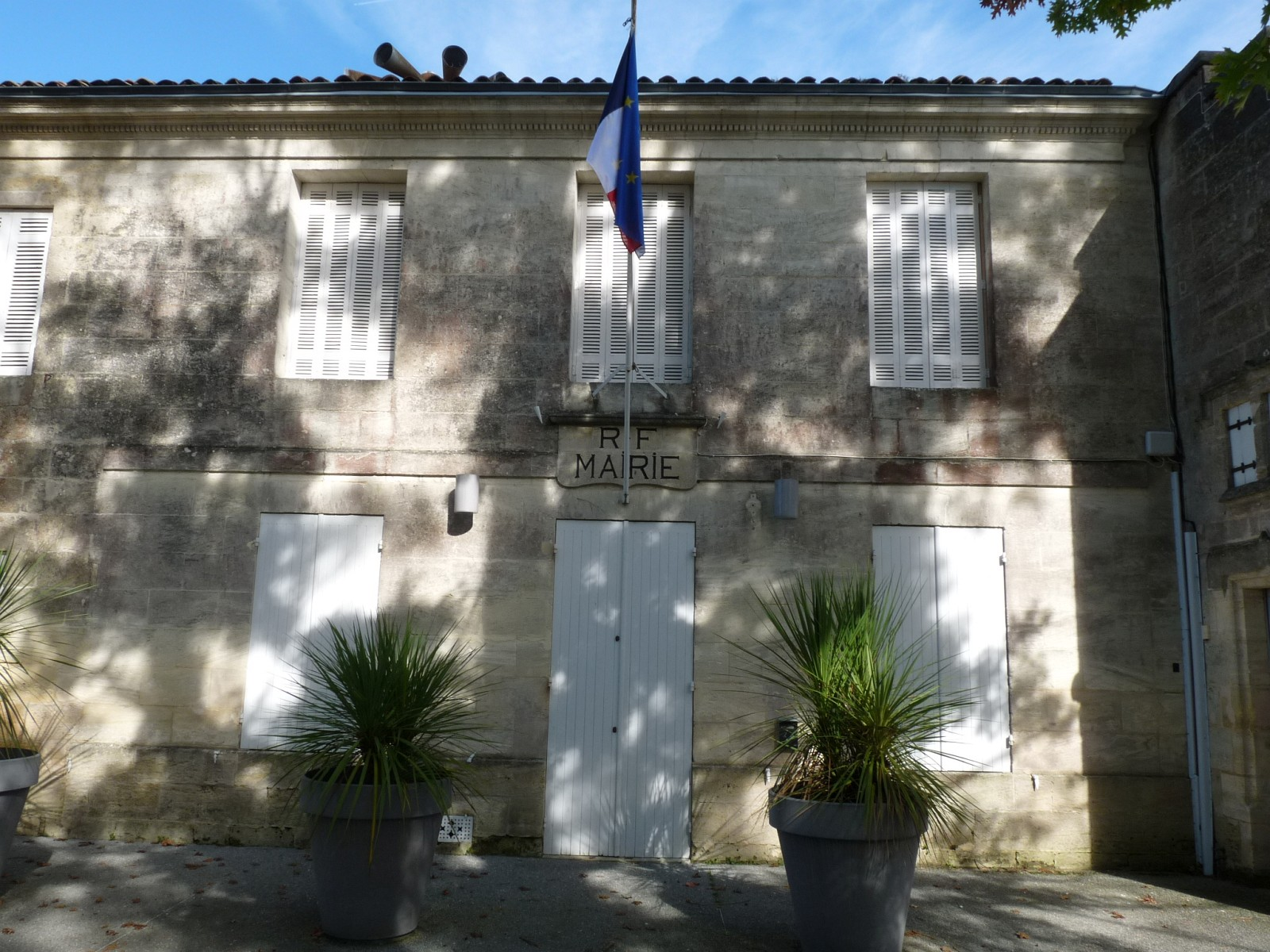
- The town hall in Comps
- Location of Comps
- Location within France Location within Nouvelle-Aquitaine
- Coordinates: 45°04′09″N 0°35′39″W
- Country: France
- Region: Nouvelle-Aquitaine
- Department: Gironde
- Arrondissement: Blaye
- Canton: L'Estuaire
- Intercommunality: Blaye

Government
  - Mayor (2020–2026): Didier Bayard
- Area^{1}: 1.66 km^{2} (0.64 sq mi)
- Elevation: 68 m (223 ft)
- Highest elevation: 82 m (269 ft)
- Lowest elevation: 28 m (92 ft)
- Population (2023): 531
  - Density: 320/km^{2} (828/sq mi)
- Time zone: UTC+01:00 (CET)
  - Summer (DST): UTC+02:00 (CEST)
- INSEE/Postal code: 33132 /33710
- ^{1} French Land Register data, which excludes lakes, ponds, glaciers > 1 km^{2} (0.386 sq mi or 247 acres) and river estuaries.

Comps is a commune in the Gironde department in Nouvelle-Aquitaine in southwestern France.

== Population ==
Historical population
Year	Pop.	±% p.a.
1968	351	—
1975	339	−0.50%
1982	352	+0.54%
1990	399	+1.58%
1999	389	−0.28%
2007	447	+1.75%
2012	504	+2.43%
2017	540	+1.39%
2023	531	−0.28%
Source: INSEE

== See also ==
- Communes of the Gironde department
