= Saint-Genès-de-Blaye =

- Commune
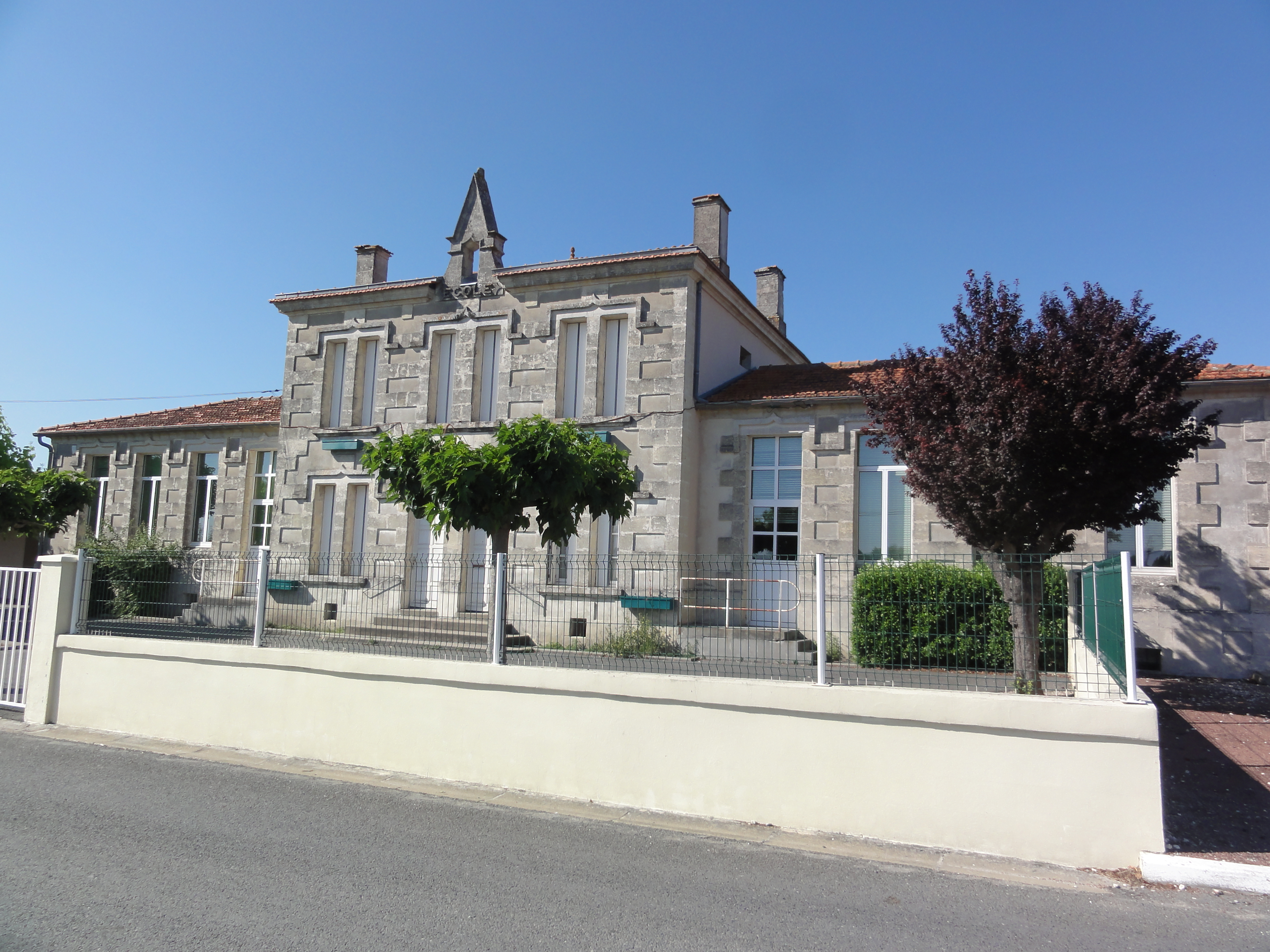
- Town hall
- Location of Saint-Genès-de-Blaye
- Location within France Location within Nouvelle-Aquitaine
- Coordinates: 45°09′46″N 0°38′25″W
- Country: France
- Region: Nouvelle-Aquitaine
- Department: Gironde
- Arrondissement: Blaye
- Canton: L'Estuaire
- Intercommunality: Blaye

Government
  - Mayor (2020–2026): Michel Sarton
- Area^{1}: 7.41 km^{2} (2.86 sq mi)
- Elevation: 12 m (39 ft)
- Highest elevation: 34 m (112 ft)
- Lowest elevation: 0 m (0 ft)
- Population (2023): 491
  - Density: 66.3/km^{2} (172/sq mi)
- Time zone: UTC+01:00 (CET)
  - Summer (DST): UTC+02:00 (CEST)
- INSEE/Postal code: 33405 /33390
- ^{1} French Land Register data, which excludes lakes, ponds, glaciers > 1 km^{2} (0.386 sq mi or 247 acres) and river estuaries.

Saint-Genès-de-Blaye (French pronunciation: [sɛ̃ ʒənɛs də blaj], literally Saint-Genès of Blaye) is a commune in the Gironde department in Nouvelle-Aquitaine in southwestern France.

== Population ==
Historical population
Year	Pop.	±% p.a.
1968	394	—
1975	400	+0.22%
1982	387	−0.47%
1990	428	+1.27%
1999	396	−0.86%
2007	448	+1.55%
2012	480	+1.39%
2017	485	+0.21%
2023	491	+0.21%
Source: INSEE

== See also ==
- Communes of the Gironde department
