= Saint-Trojan =

- Commune
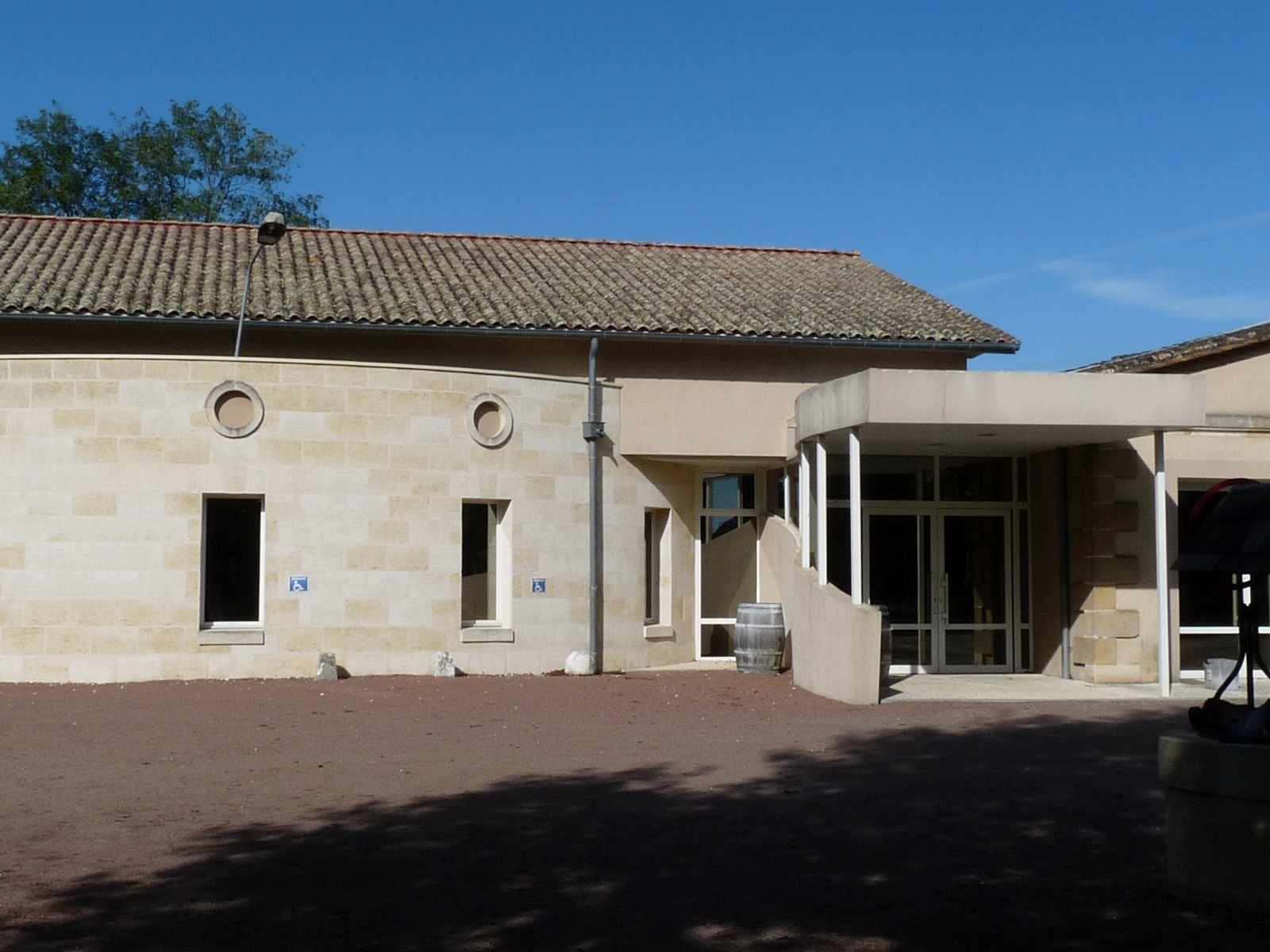
- The town hall in Saint-Trojan
- Location of Saint-Trojan
- Location within France Location within Nouvelle-Aquitaine
- Coordinates: 45°05′19″N 0°34′44″W
- Country: France
- Region: Nouvelle-Aquitaine
- Department: Gironde
- Arrondissement: Blaye
- Canton: L'Estuaire
- Intercommunality: Grand Cubzaguais

Government
  - Mayor (2020–2026): Bruno Gravino
- Area^{1}: 3.05 km^{2} (1.18 sq mi)
- Elevation: 92 m (302 ft)
- Highest elevation: 92 m (302 ft)
- Lowest elevation: 39 m (128 ft)
- Population (2023): 370
  - Density: 120/km^{2} (310/sq mi)
- Time zone: UTC+01:00 (CET)
  - Summer (DST): UTC+02:00 (CEST)
- INSEE/Postal code: 33486 /33710
- ^{1} French Land Register data, which excludes lakes, ponds, glaciers > 1 km^{2} (0.386 sq mi or 247 acres) and river estuaries.

Saint-Trojan (French pronunciation: [sɛ̃ tʁɔʒɑ̃]; Occitan: Sant Troian) is a commune in the Gironde department in Nouvelle-Aquitaine in southwestern France. It is in the Blaye wine region of Bordeaux, with the Château Mercier and Vignobles Briolais vineyards located in the village.

The United States Navy established a naval air station on 14 July 1918 to operate seaplanes during World War I. The base closed shortly after the First Armistice at Compiègne.

== Population ==
Historical population
Year	Pop.	±% p.a.
1968	234	—
1975	259	+1.46%
1982	269	+0.54%
1990	288	+0.86%
1999	318	+1.11%
2007	309	−0.36%
2012	331	+1.39%
2017	342	+0.66%
2023	370	+1.32%
Source: INSEE

== See also ==
- Communes of the Gironde department
