= Samonac =

- Commune
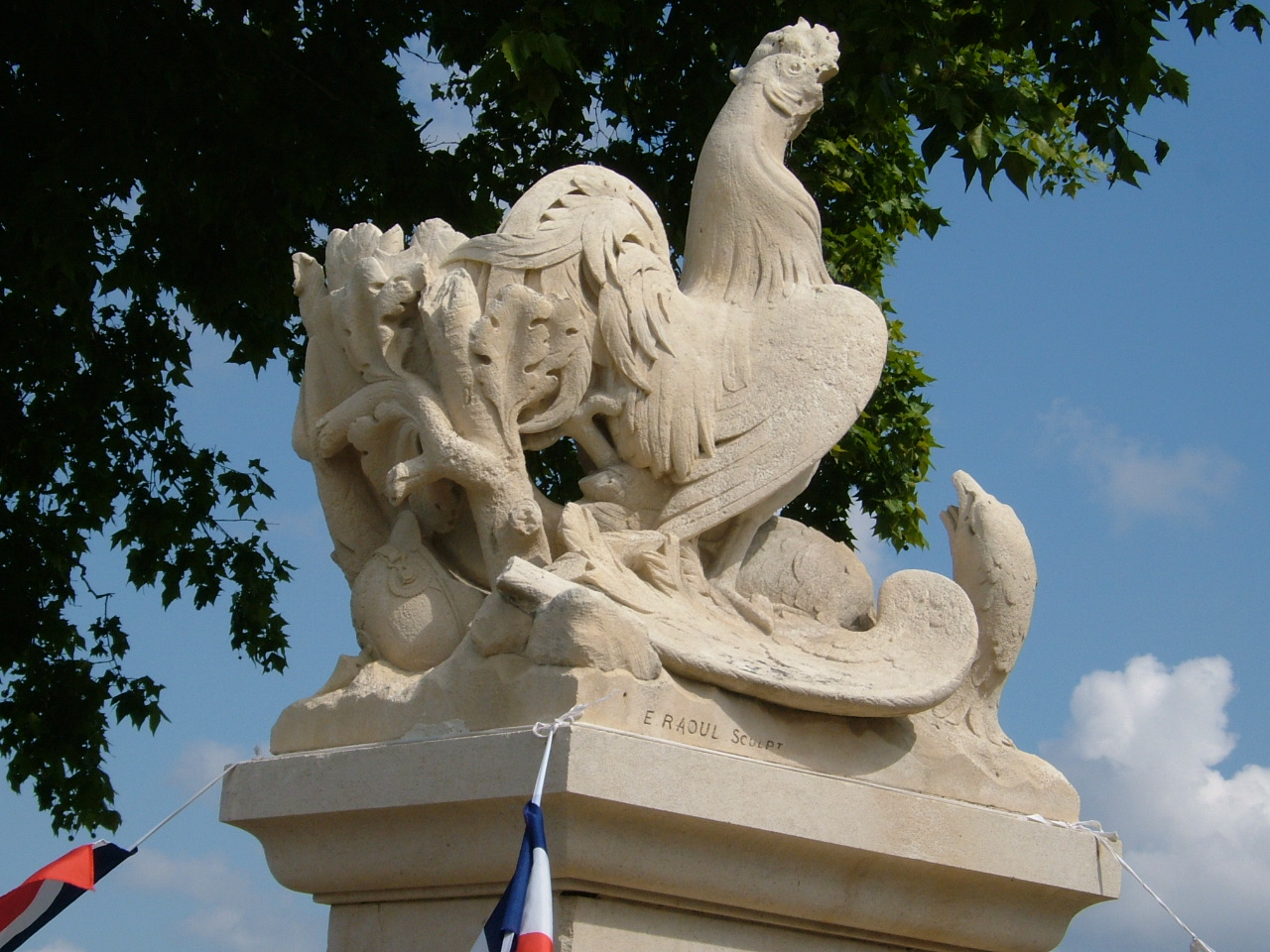
- World War I memorial

- Coat of arms
- Location of Samonac
- Location within France Location within Nouvelle-Aquitaine
- Coordinates: 45°04′29″N 0°34′06″W
- Country: France
- Region: Nouvelle-Aquitaine
- Department: Gironde
- Arrondissement: Blaye
- Canton: L'Estuaire
- Intercommunality: Blaye

Government
  - Mayor (2020–2026): Marie-Lise Giovannucci
- Area^{1}: 3.9 km^{2} (1.5 sq mi)
- Elevation: 87 m (285 ft)
- Highest elevation: 88 m (289 ft)
- Lowest elevation: 17 m (56 ft)
- Population (2023): 474
  - Density: 120/km^{2} (310/sq mi)
- Time zone: UTC+01:00 (CET)
  - Summer (DST): UTC+02:00 (CEST)
- INSEE/Postal code: 33500 /33710
- ^{1} French Land Register data, which excludes lakes, ponds, glaciers > 1 km^{2} (0.386 sq mi or 247 acres) and river estuaries.

Samonac (French pronunciation: [samɔnak]) is a commune in the Gironde department in Nouvelle-Aquitaine in southwestern France.

== Population ==
Historical population
Year	Pop.	±% p.a.
1968	350	—
1975	349	−0.04%
1982	367	+0.72%
1990	388	+0.70%
1999	377	−0.32%
2007	399	+0.71%
2012	444	+2.16%
2017	426	−0.82%
2023	474	+1.80%
Source: INSEE

== See also ==
- Communes of the Gironde department
