= Anglade =

- Commune
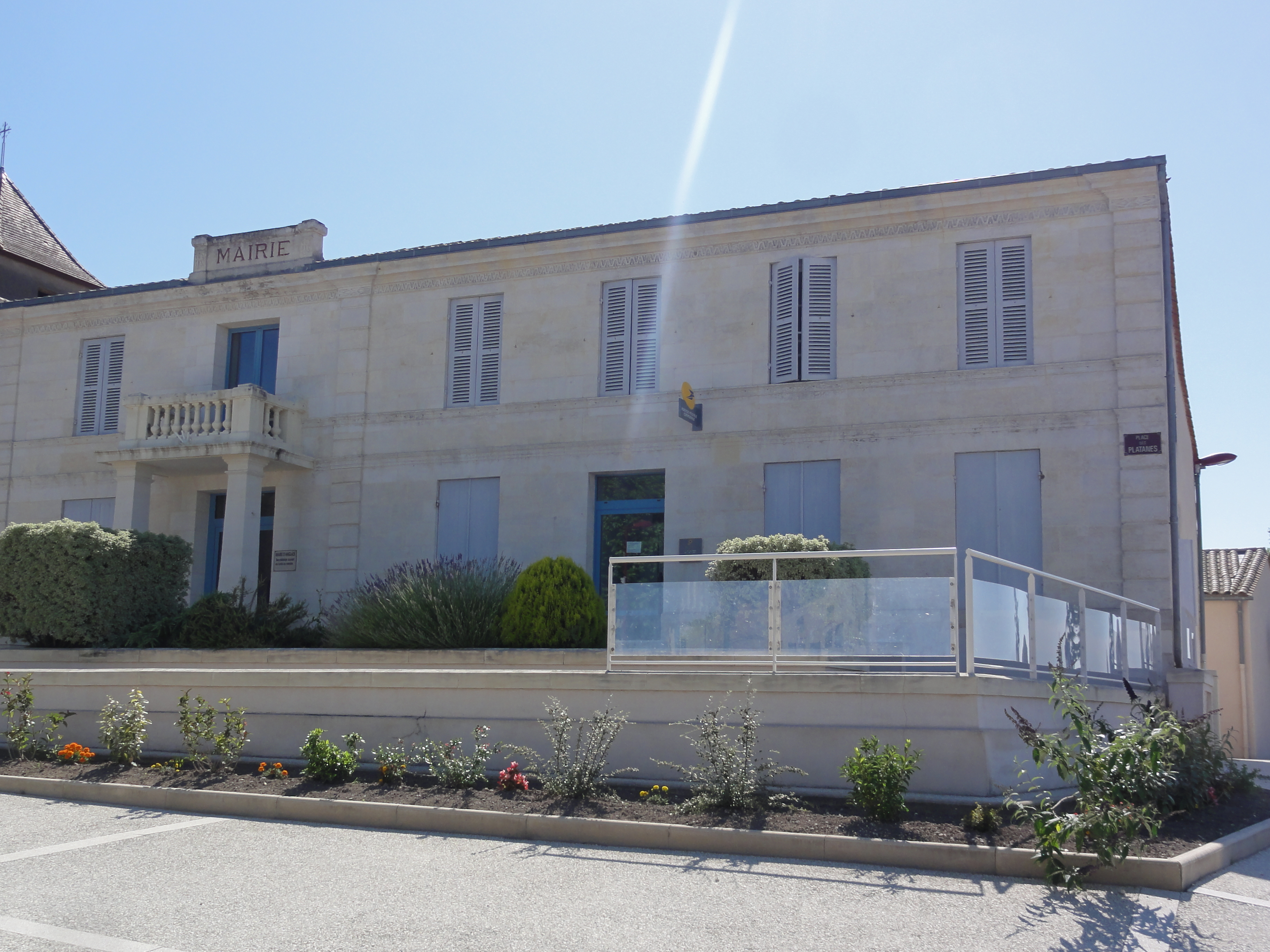
- Town hall
- Location of Anglade
- Location within France Location within Nouvelle-Aquitaine
- Coordinates: 45°12′43″N 0°38′09″W
- Country: France
- Region: Nouvelle-Aquitaine
- Department: Gironde
- Arrondissement: Blaye
- Canton: L'Estuaire
- Intercommunality: L'Estuaire

Government
  - Mayor (2021–2026): Fabien Verrat
- Area^{1}: 13.82 km^{2} (5.34 sq mi)
- Elevation: 11 m (36 ft)
- Highest elevation: 32 m (105 ft)
- Lowest elevation: 1 m (3.3 ft)
- Population (2023): 887
  - Density: 64.2/km^{2} (166/sq mi)
- Time zone: UTC+01:00 (CET)
  - Summer (DST): UTC+02:00 (CEST)
- INSEE/Postal code: 33006 /33390
- ^{1} French Land Register data, which excludes lakes, ponds, glaciers > 1 km^{2} (0.386 sq mi or 247 acres) and river estuaries.

Anglade (French pronunciation: [ɑ̃ɡlad]) is a commune of the Gironde department in southwestern France.

== Population ==
Historical population
Year	Pop.	±% p.a.
1968	853	—
1975	777	−1.32%
1982	796	+0.35%
1990	758	−0.61%
1999	769	+0.16%
2007	819	+0.79%
2012	925	+2.46%
2017	947	+0.47%
2023	887	−1.08%
Source: INSEE

== See also ==
- Communes of the Gironde department
