= Eyrans =

- Commune
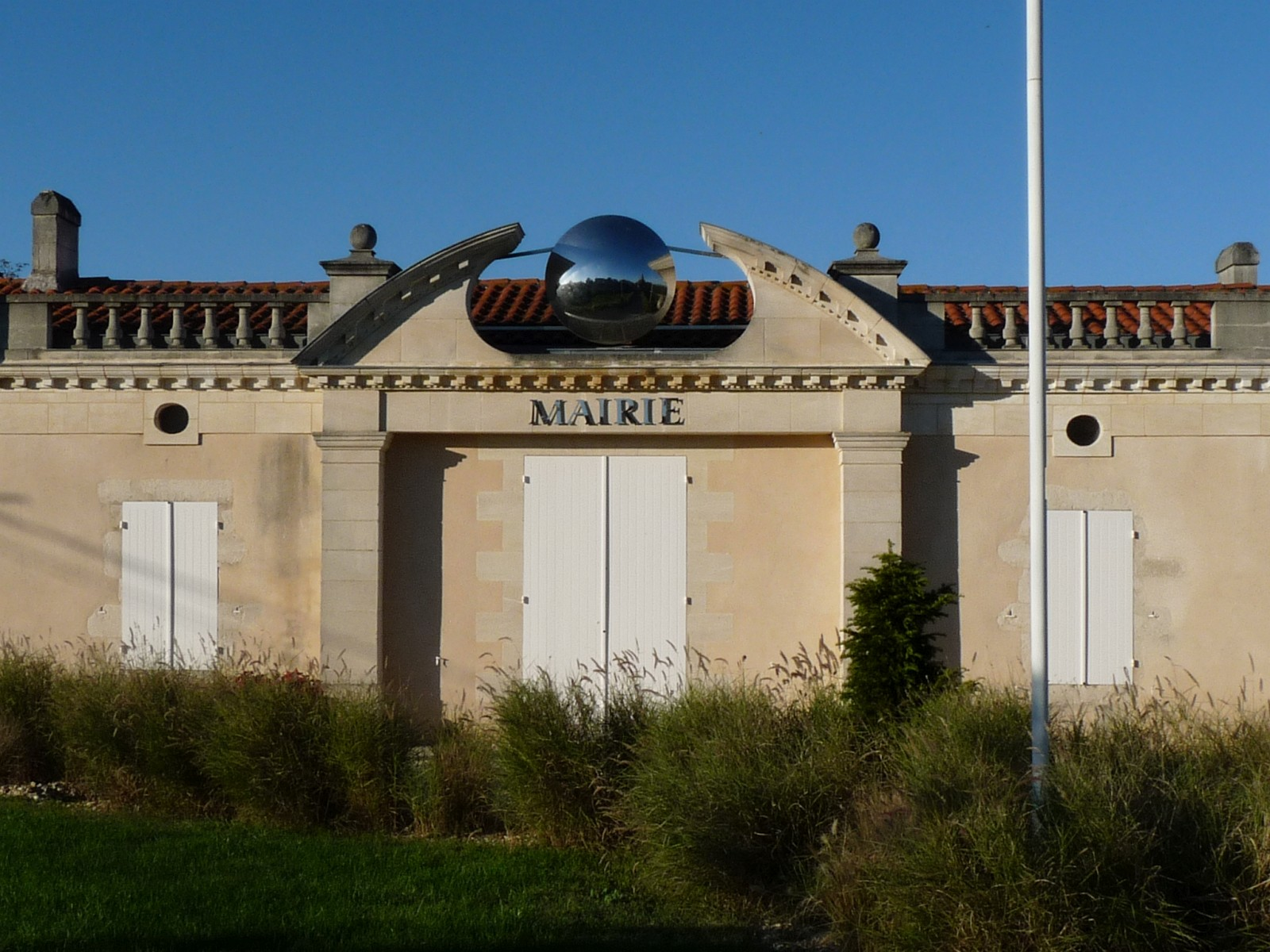
- Town hall
- Location of Eyrans
- Location within France Location within Nouvelle-Aquitaine
- Coordinates: 45°11′21″N 0°36′55″W
- Country: France
- Region: Nouvelle-Aquitaine
- Department: Gironde
- Arrondissement: Blaye
- Canton: L'Estuaire
- Intercommunality: Estuaire

Government
  - Mayor (2020–2026): Bernard Bailan
- Area^{1}: 4.28 km^{2} (1.65 sq mi)
- Highest elevation: 27 m (89 ft)
- Lowest elevation: 1 m (3.3 ft)
- Population (2023): 756
  - Density: 177/km^{2} (457/sq mi)
- Time zone: UTC+01:00 (CET)
  - Summer (DST): UTC+02:00 (CEST)
- INSEE/Postal code: 33161 /33390
- ^{1} French Land Register data, which excludes lakes, ponds, glaciers > 1 km^{2} (0.386 sq mi or 247 acres) and river estuaries.

Eyrans is a commune in the Gironde department in southwestern France.

== Population ==
Historical population
Year	Pop.	±% p.a.
1968	448	—
1975	415	−1.09%
1982	557	+4.29%
1990	596	+0.85%
1999	580	−0.30%
2007	644	+1.32%
2012	704	+1.80%
2017	773	+1.89%
2023	756	−0.37%
Source: INSEE

== See also ==
- Communes of the Gironde department
