= Fours, Gironde =

Fours
- Commune
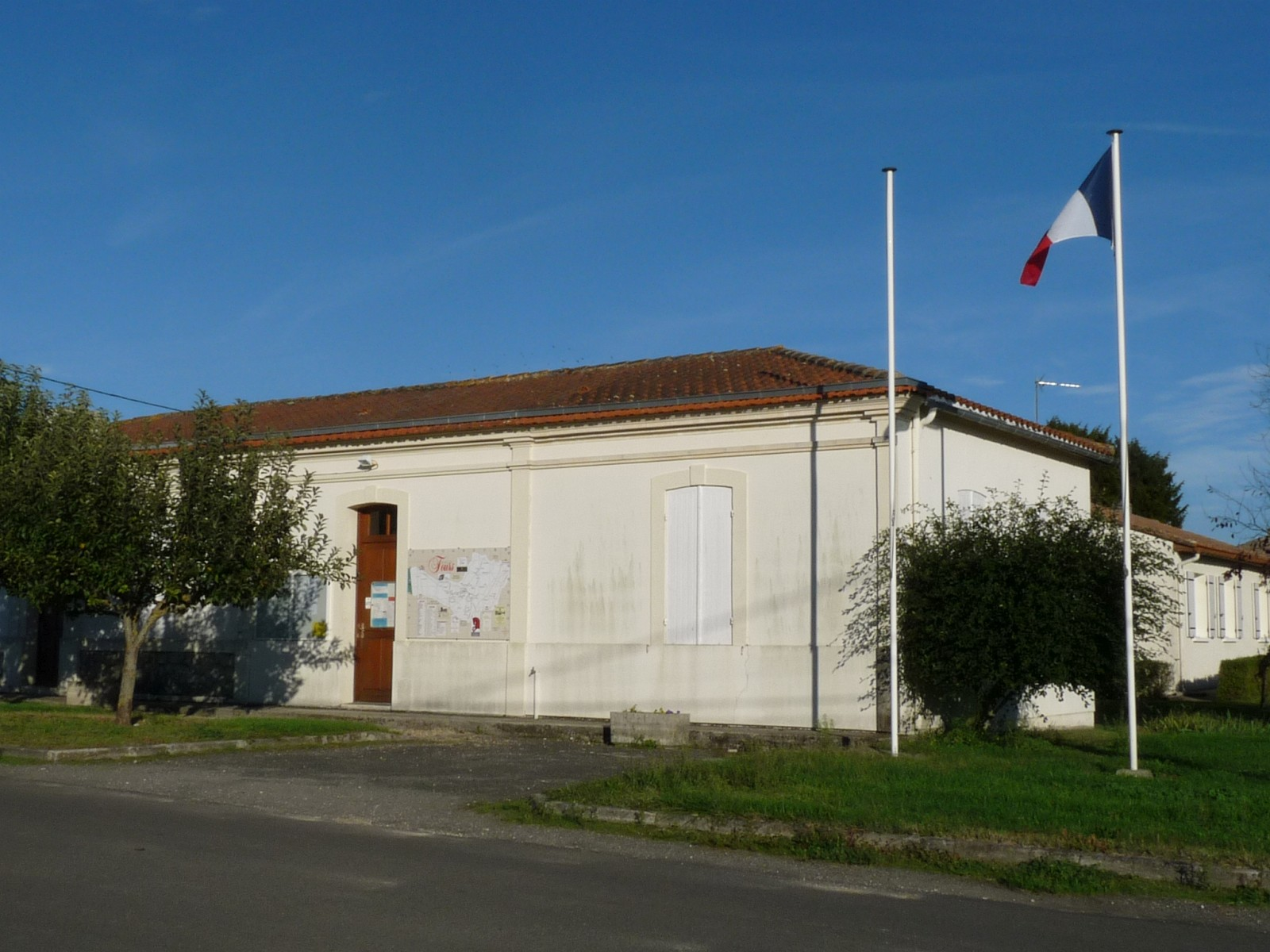
- Town hall
- Location of Fours
- Location within France Location within Nouvelle-Aquitaine
- Coordinates: 45°10′28″N 0°37′41″W
- Country: France
- Region: Nouvelle-Aquitaine
- Department: Gironde
- Arrondissement: Blaye
- Canton: L'Estuaire
- Intercommunality: Blaye

Government
  - Mayor (2020–2026): Jean-Michel Belis
- Area^{1}: 4.64 km^{2} (1.79 sq mi)
- Elevation: 20 m (66 ft)
- Highest elevation: 33 m (108 ft)
- Lowest elevation: 0 m (0 ft)
- Population (2023): 260
  - Density: 56/km^{2} (150/sq mi)
- Time zone: UTC+01:00 (CET)
  - Summer (DST): UTC+02:00 (CEST)
- INSEE/Postal code: 33172 /33390
- ^{1} French Land Register data, which excludes lakes, ponds, glaciers > 1 km^{2} (0.386 sq mi or 247 acres) and river estuaries.

Fours (Occitan: Forns) is a commune in the Gironde department in Nouvelle-Aquitaine in southwestern France.

== Population ==
Historical population
Year	Pop.	±% p.a.
208	1,975	—
195	1,982	+0.03%
252	1,990	+0.01%
250	1,999	+0.23%
279	2,007	+0.01%
293	2,012	+0.02%
299	2,017	+0.04%
318	2,023	+0.02%
260		—
Source: INSEE

== See also ==
- Communes of the Gironde department
