= Prignac-et-Marcamps =

- Commune
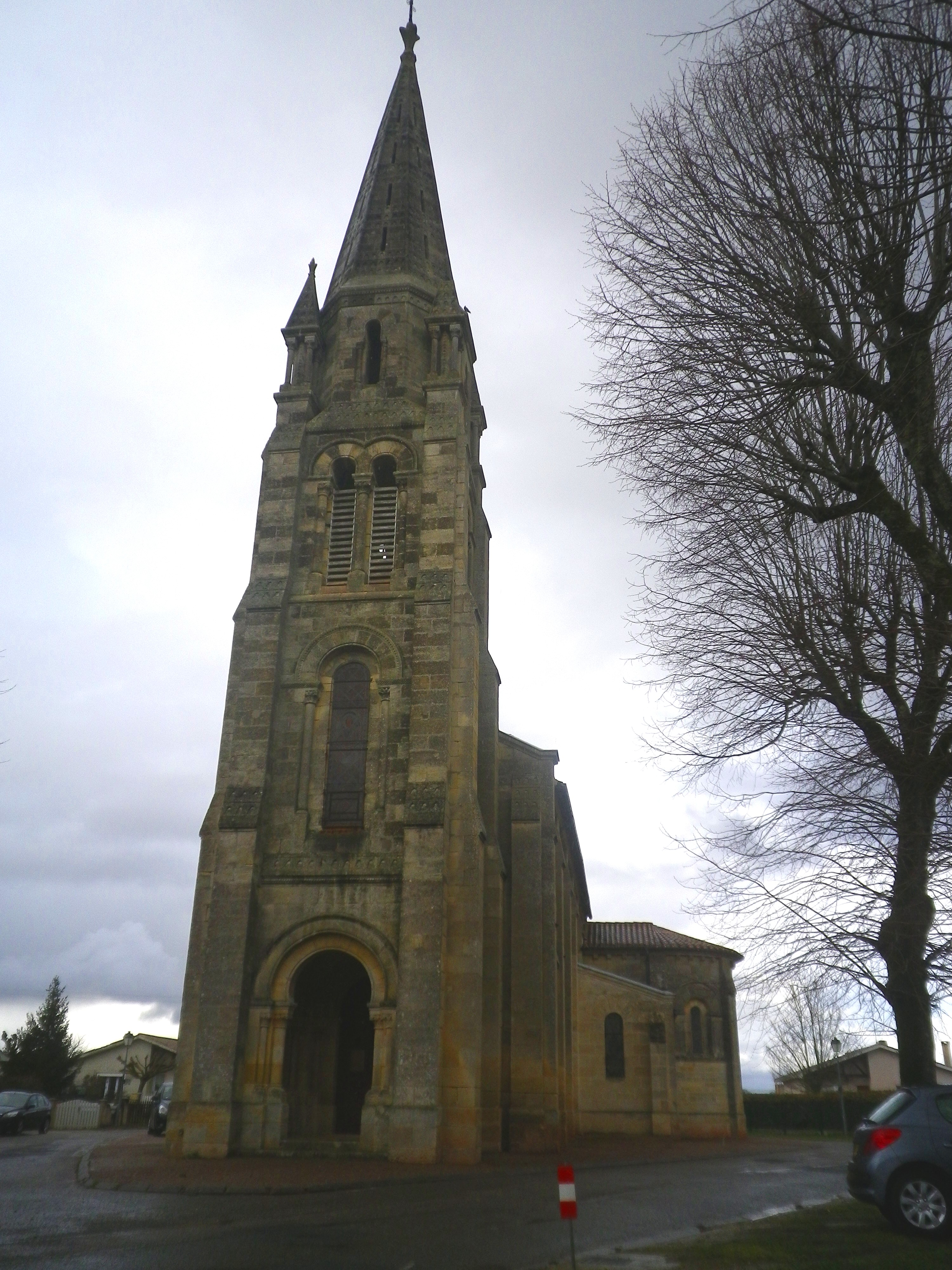
- The church in Prignac

- Coat of arms
- Location of Prignac-et-Marcamps
- Location within France Location within Nouvelle-Aquitaine
- Coordinates: 45°02′00″N 0°29′32″W
- Country: France
- Region: Nouvelle-Aquitaine
- Department: Gironde
- Arrondissement: Blaye
- Canton: L'Estuaire
- Intercommunality: Grand Cubzaguais

Government
  - Mayor (2021–2026): Francis Berard
- Area^{1}: 9.66 km^{2} (3.73 sq mi)
- Elevation: 22 m (72 ft)
- Highest elevation: 42 m (138 ft)
- Lowest elevation: 2 m (6.6 ft)
- Population (2023): 1,494
  - Density: 155/km^{2} (401/sq mi)
- Time zone: UTC+01:00 (CET)
  - Summer (DST): UTC+02:00 (CEST)
- INSEE/Postal code: 33339 /33710
- ^{1} French Land Register data, which excludes lakes, ponds, glaciers > 1 km^{2} (0.386 sq mi or 247 acres) and river estuaries.

Prignac-et-Marcamps (French pronunciation: [pʁiɲak e maʁkɑ̃]; Occitan: Prinhac e Marcamps) is a commune in the Gironde department in Nouvelle-Aquitaine in southwestern France. The commune was formed in 1965 by the merger of the former communes Prignac-et-Cazelles and Marcamps.

== Population ==
Historical population
Year	Pop.	±% p.a.
1968	812	—
1975	1,069	+4.01%
1982	1,262	+2.40%
1990	1,268	+0.06%
1999	1,286	+0.16%
2007	1,362	+0.72%
2012	1,384	+0.32%
2017	1,379	−0.07%
2023	1,494	+1.34%
Source: INSEE

== See also ==
- Communes of the Gironde department
