= Campugnan =

- Commune
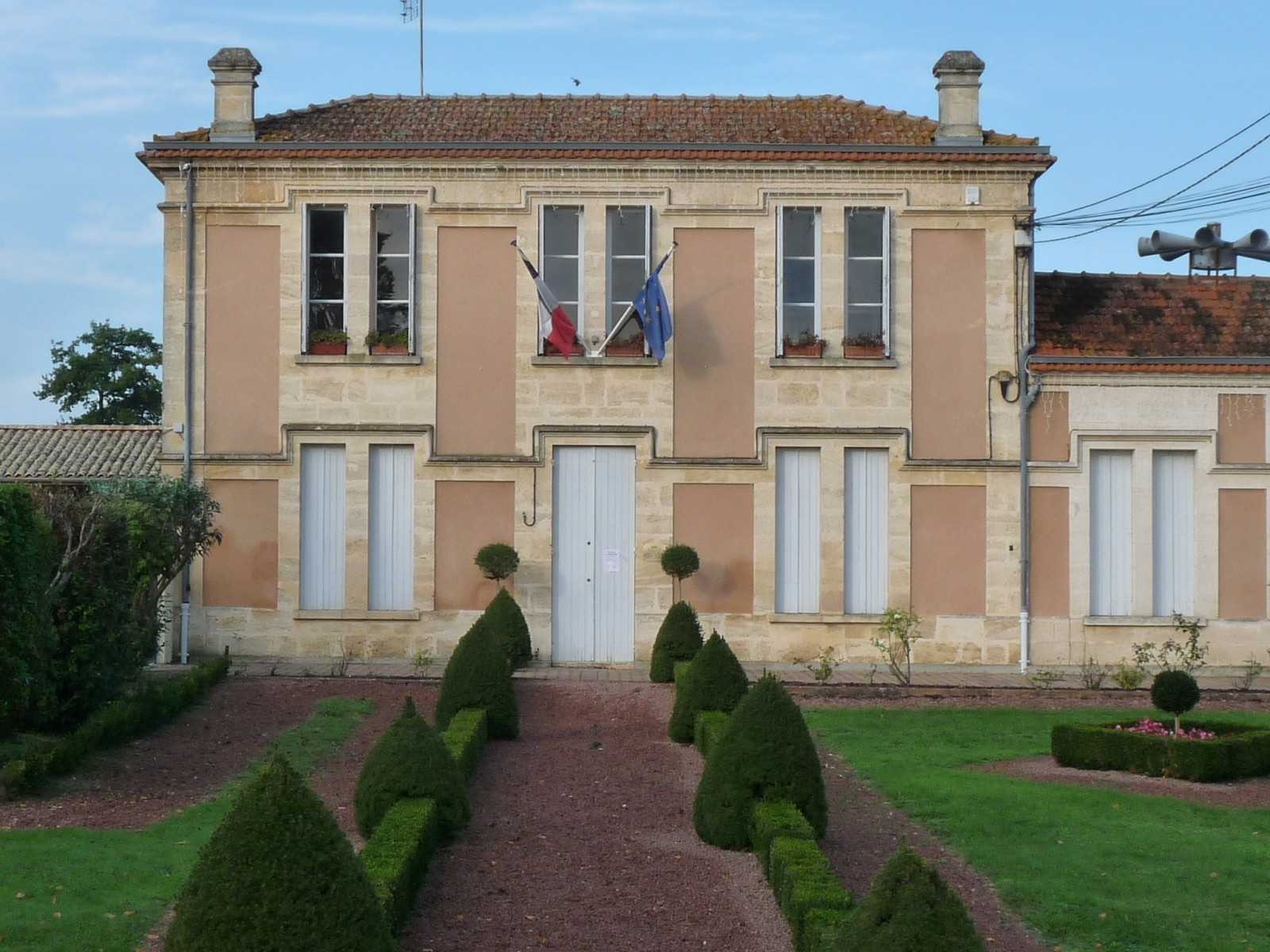
- The town hall in Campugnan

- Coat of arms
- Location of Campugnan
- Location within France Location within Nouvelle-Aquitaine
- Coordinates: 45°10′42″N 0°33′45″W
- Country: France
- Region: Nouvelle-Aquitaine
- Department: Gironde
- Arrondissement: Blaye
- Canton: L'Estuaire
- Intercommunality: Blaye

Government
  - Mayor (2020–2026): Gilles Laé
- Area^{1}: 6.23 km^{2} (2.41 sq mi)
- Elevation: 84 m (276 ft)
- Highest elevation: 43 m (141 ft)
- Lowest elevation: 14 m (46 ft)
- Population (2023): 516
  - Density: 82.8/km^{2} (215/sq mi)
- Time zone: UTC+01:00 (CET)
  - Summer (DST): UTC+02:00 (CEST)
- INSEE/Postal code: 33089 /33390
- ^{1} French Land Register data, which excludes lakes, ponds, glaciers > 1 km^{2} (0.386 sq mi or 247 acres) and river estuaries.

Campugnan (French pronunciation: [kɑ̃pyɲɑ̃]) is a commune in the Gironde department in Nouvelle-Aquitaine in southwestern France.

== Population ==
Historical population
Year	Pop.	±% p.a.
1968	348	—
1975	303	−1.96%
1982	404	+4.20%
1990	427	+0.69%
1999	407	−0.53%
2007	455	+1.40%
2012	473	+0.78%
2017	496	+0.95%
2023	516	+0.66%
Source: INSEE

== See also ==
- Communes of the Gironde department
