= Saint-Palais, Gironde =

Saint-Palais
- Commune
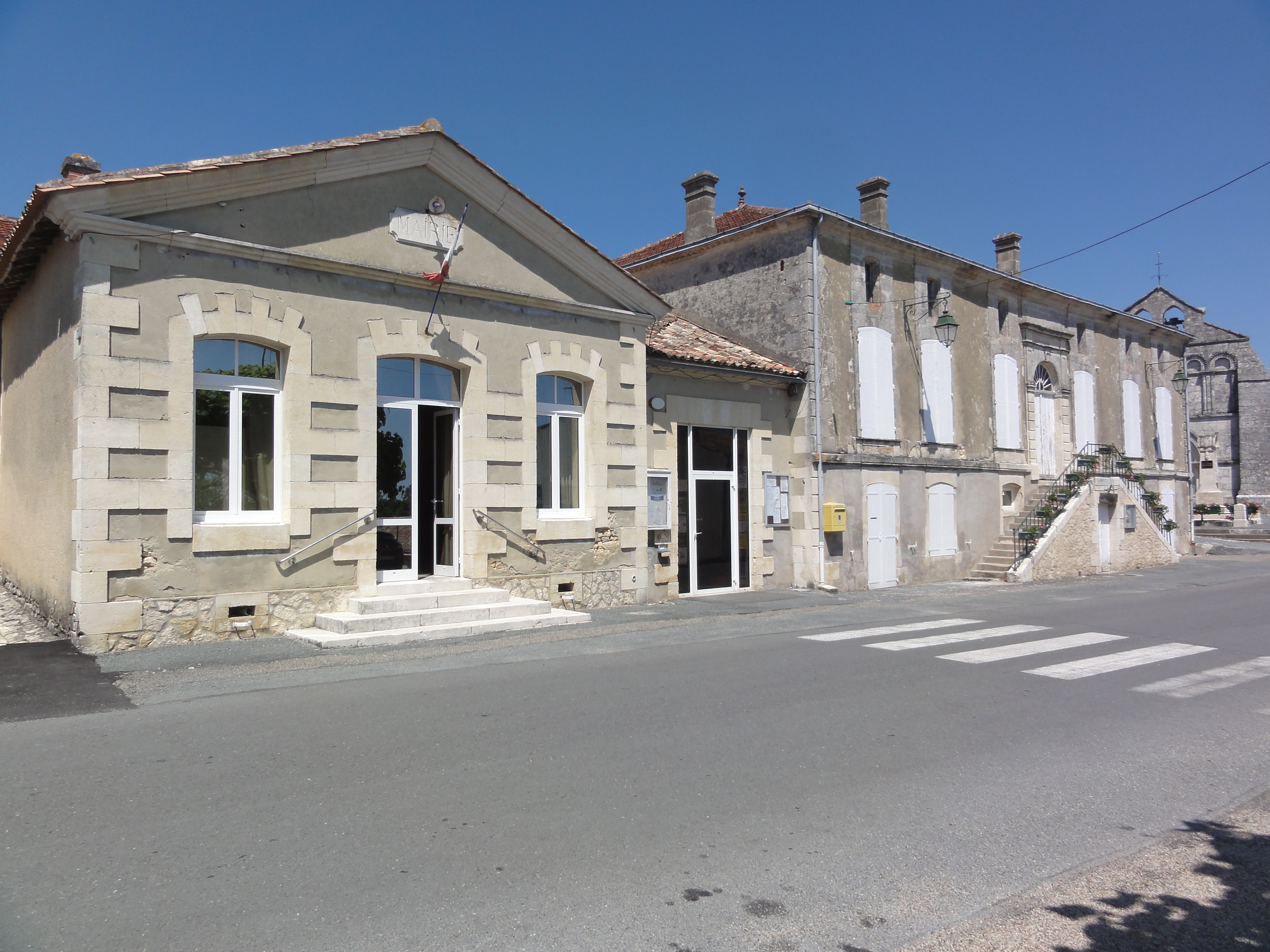
- Town hall
- Location of Saint-Palais
- Location within France Location within Nouvelle-Aquitaine
- Coordinates: 45°18′52″N 0°35′19″W
- Country: France
- Region: Nouvelle-Aquitaine
- Department: Gironde
- Arrondissement: Blaye
- Canton: L'Estuaire
- Intercommunality: Estuaire

Government
  - Mayor (2020–2026): Jacky Terrancle
- Area^{1}: 9.76 km^{2} (3.77 sq mi)
- Elevation: 60 m (200 ft)
- Highest elevation: 91 m (299 ft)
- Lowest elevation: 7 m (23 ft)
- Population (2023): 527
  - Density: 54.0/km^{2} (140/sq mi)
- Time zone: UTC+01:00 (CET)
  - Summer (DST): UTC+02:00 (CEST)
- INSEE/Postal code: 33456 /33820
- ^{1} French Land Register data, which excludes lakes, ponds, glaciers > 1 km^{2} (0.386 sq mi or 247 acres) and river estuaries.

Saint-Palais (French pronunciation: [sɛ̃ palɛ]; Occitan: Sant Palat) is a commune in the Gironde department in Nouvelle-Aquitaine in southwestern France.

== Population ==
Historical population
| Year | Pop. | ±% p.a. |
|---|---|---|
| 1968 | 452 | — |
| 1975 | 396 | −1.87% |
| 1982 | 443 | +1.62% |
| 1990 | 409 | −0.99% |
| 1999 | 420 | +0.30% |
| 2007 | 473 | +1.50% |
| 2012 | 506 | +1.36% |
| 2017 | 505 | −0.04% |
| 2023 | 527 | +0.71% |
Source: INSEE

== See also ==
- Communes of the Gironde department
