= Saint-Paul, Gironde =

Saint-Paul
- Commune
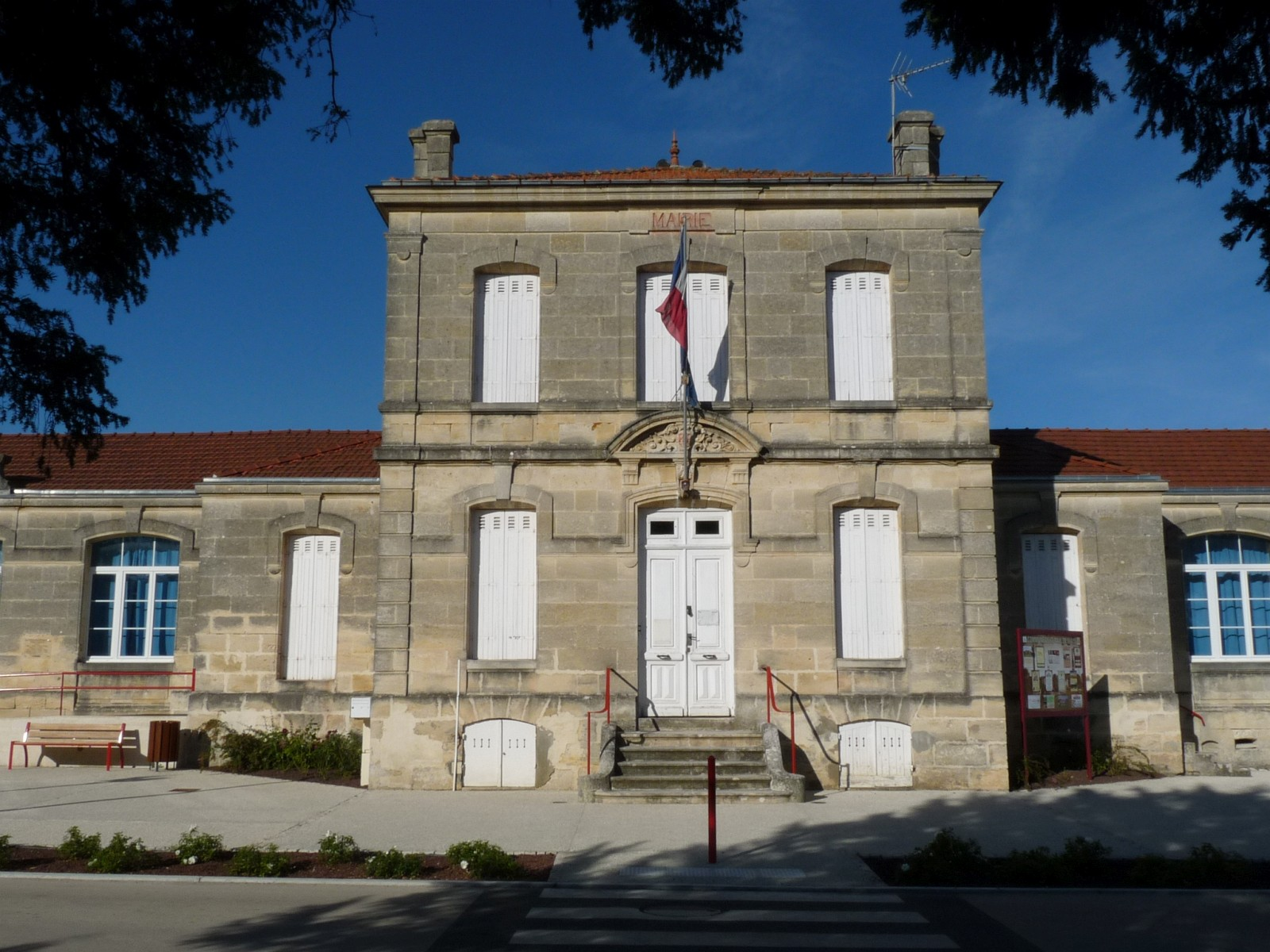
- The town hall in Saint-Paul

- Coat of arms
- Location of Saint-Paul
- Location within France Location within Nouvelle-Aquitaine
- Coordinates: 45°08′56″N 0°36′14″W
- Country: France
- Region: Nouvelle-Aquitaine
- Department: Gironde
- Arrondissement: Blaye
- Canton: L'Estuaire

Government
  - Mayor (2020–2026): Jean-Pierre Duez
- Area^{1}: 10.87 km^{2} (4.20 sq mi)
- Elevation: 31 m (102 ft)
- Highest elevation: 46 m (151 ft)
- Lowest elevation: 17 m (56 ft)
- Population (2023): 1,020
  - Density: 93.8/km^{2} (243/sq mi)
- Time zone: UTC+01:00 (CET)
  - Summer (DST): UTC+02:00 (CEST)
- INSEE/Postal code: 33458 /33390
- ^{1} French Land Register data, which excludes lakes, ponds, glaciers > 1 km^{2} (0.386 sq mi or 247 acres) and river estuaries.

Saint-Paul (French pronunciation: [sɛ̃ pɔl] Occitan: Sant Pau) is a commune in the Gironde department in Nouvelle-Aquitaine in southwestern France.

== Population ==
Historical population
Year	Pop.	±% p.a.
1968	750	—
1975	704	−0.90%
1982	777	+1.42%
1990	831	+0.84%
1999	859	+0.37%
2007	892	+0.47%
2012	951	+1.29%
2017	935	−0.34%
2023	1,020	+1.46%
Source: INSEE

== See also ==
- Communes of the Gironde department
