= Saint-Aubin-de-Blaye =

- Commune
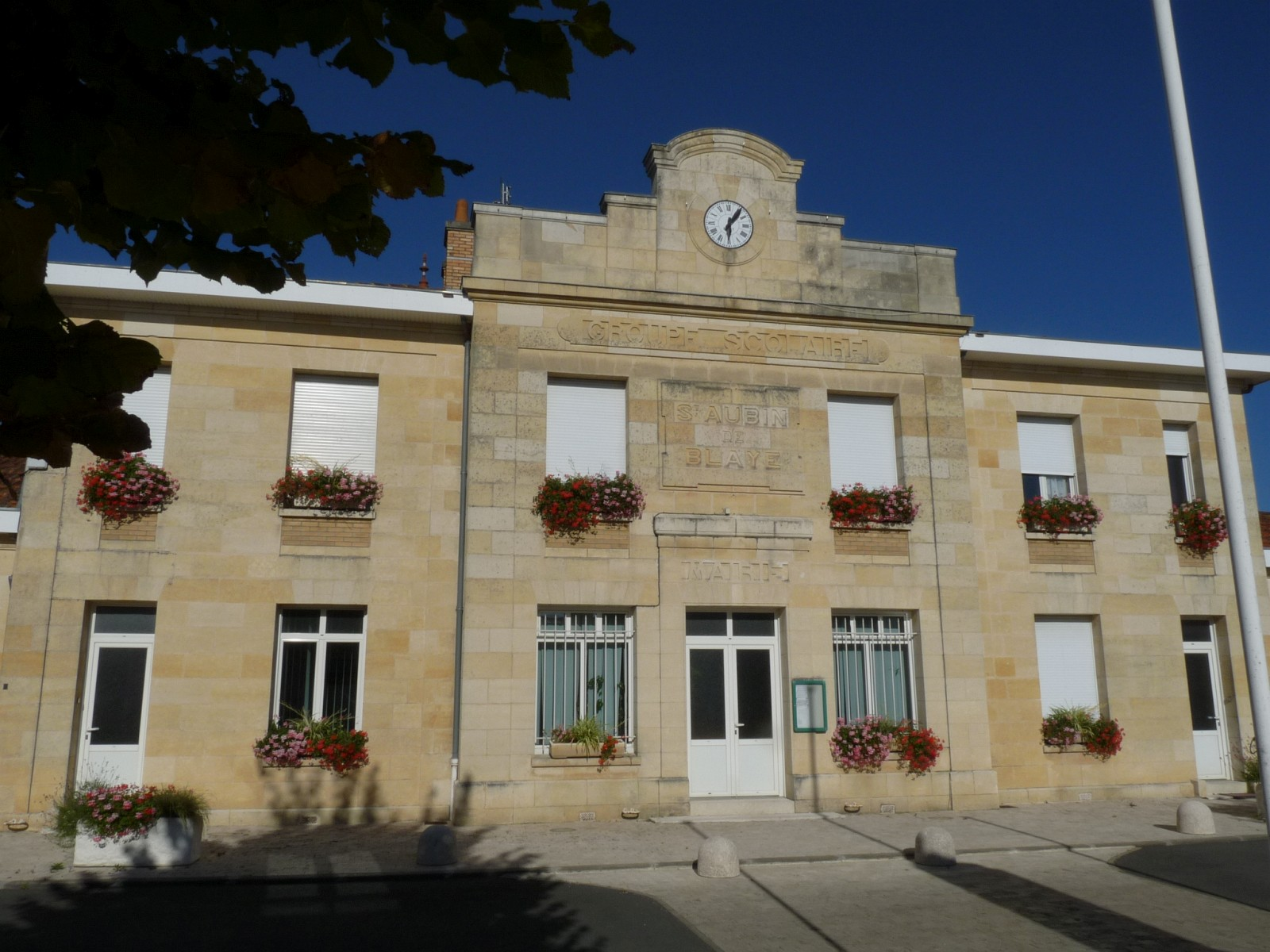
- The town hall in Saint-Aubin-de-Blaye
- Location of Saint-Aubin-de-Blaye
- Location within France Location within Nouvelle-Aquitaine
- Coordinates: 45°16′08″N 0°33′35″W
- Country: France
- Region: Nouvelle-Aquitaine
- Department: Gironde
- Arrondissement: Blaye
- Canton: L'Estuaire
- Intercommunality: Estuaire

Government
  - Mayor (2020–2026): Arnaud Ovide
- Area^{1}: 11.54 km^{2} (4.46 sq mi)
- Elevation: 22 m (72 ft)
- Highest elevation: 37 m (121 ft)
- Lowest elevation: 2 m (6.6 ft)
- Population (2023): 838
  - Density: 72.6/km^{2} (188/sq mi)
- Time zone: UTC+01:00 (CET)
  - Summer (DST): UTC+02:00 (CEST)
- INSEE/Postal code: 33374 /33820
- ^{1} French Land Register data, which excludes lakes, ponds, glaciers > 1 km^{2} (0.386 sq mi or 247 acres) and river estuaries.

Saint-Aubin-de-Blaye (French pronunciation: [sɛ̃.t‿obɛ̃ də blaj], literally Saint-Aubin of Blaye) is a commune in the Gironde department in Nouvelle-Aquitaine in southwestern France.

== Population ==
Historical population
Year	Pop.	±% p.a.
1968	603	—
1975	561	−1.03%
1982	605	+1.08%
1990	630	+0.51%
1999	687	+0.97%
2007	751	+1.12%
2012	791	+1.04%
2017	821	+0.75%
2023	838	+0.34%
Source: INSEE

== See also ==
- Communes of the Gironde department
