= Saint-Androny =

- Commune
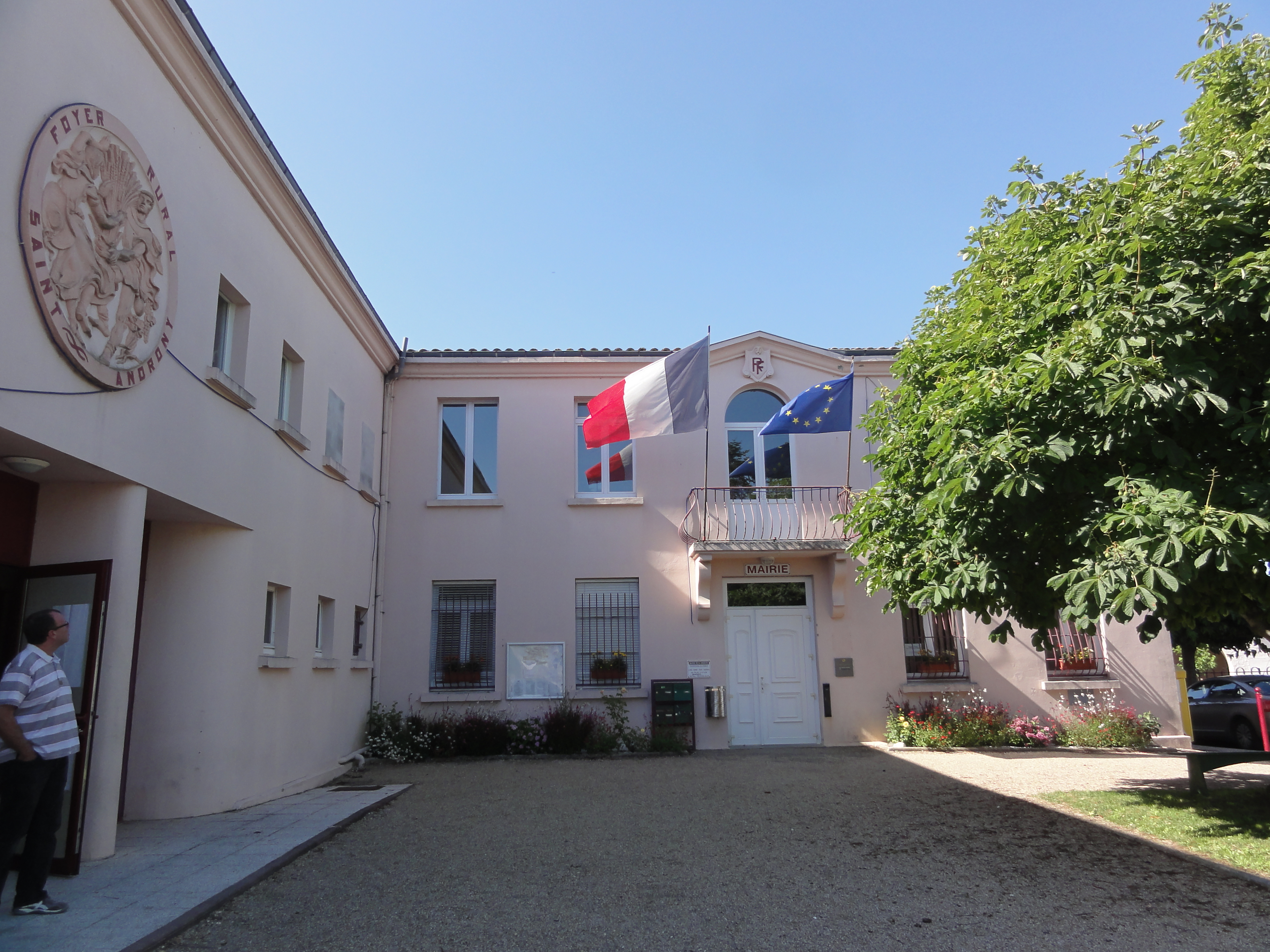
- Town hall
- Location of Saint-Androny
- Location within France Location within Nouvelle-Aquitaine
- Coordinates: 45°11′26″N 0°38′55″W
- Country: France
- Region: Nouvelle-Aquitaine
- Department: Gironde
- Arrondissement: Blaye
- Canton: L'Estuaire
- Intercommunality: l'Estuaire

Government
  - Mayor (2020–2026): Pascal Riveau
- Area^{1}: 11.65 km^{2} (4.50 sq mi)
- Elevation: 12 m (39 ft)
- Highest elevation: 36 m (118 ft)
- Lowest elevation: 0 m (0 ft)
- Population (2023): 582
  - Density: 50.0/km^{2} (129/sq mi)
- Time zone: UTC+01:00 (CET)
  - Summer (DST): UTC+02:00 (CEST)
- INSEE/Postal code: 33370 /33390
- ^{1} French Land Register data, which excludes lakes, ponds, glaciers > 1 km^{2} (0.386 sq mi or 247 acres) and river estuaries.

Saint-Androny (French pronunciation: [sɛ̃.t‿ɑ̃dʁɔni]) is a commune in the Gironde department in Nouvelle-Aquitaine in southwestern France.

== Population ==
Historical population
Year	Pop.	±% p.a.
1968	562	—
1975	442	−3.37%
1982	584	+4.06%
1990	547	−0.81%
1999	566	+0.38%
2007	580	+0.31%
2012	554	−0.91%
2017	551	−0.11%
2023	582	+0.92%
Source: INSEE

== See also ==
- Communes of the Gironde department
