= Cartelègue =

- Commune
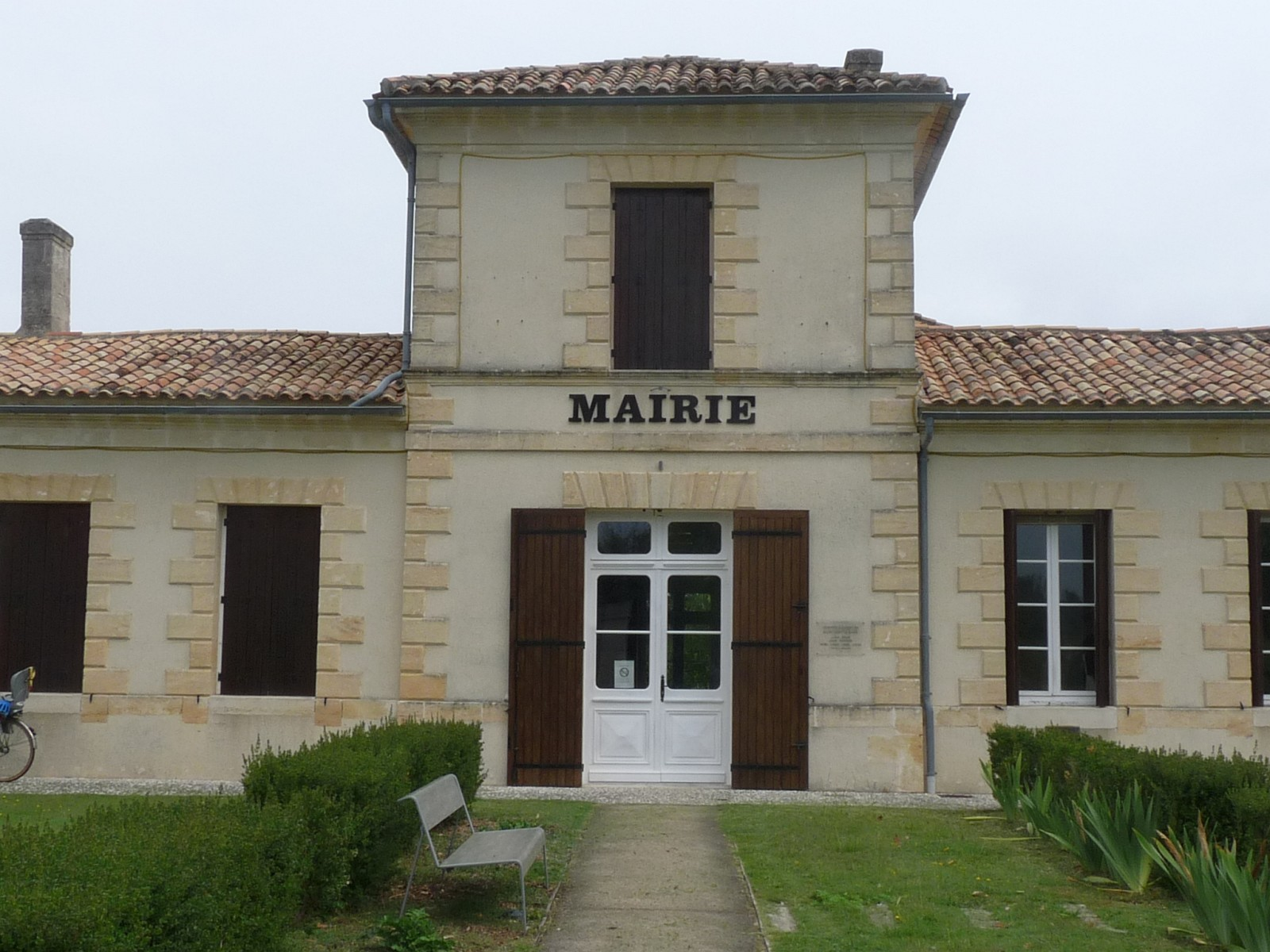
- The town hall in Cartelègue

- Coat of arms
- Location of Cartelègue
- Location within France Location within Nouvelle-Aquitaine
- Coordinates: 45°11′09″N 0°34′44″W
- Country: France
- Region: Nouvelle-Aquitaine
- Department: Gironde
- Arrondissement: Blaye
- Canton: L'Estuaire
- Intercommunality: l'Estuaire

Government
  - Mayor (2020–2026): Pierre Villar
- Area^{1}: 11.45 km^{2} (4.42 sq mi)
- Elevation: 29 m (95 ft)
- Highest elevation: 39 m (128 ft)
- Lowest elevation: 4 m (13 ft)
- Population (2023): 1,334
  - Density: 116.5/km^{2} (301.8/sq mi)
- Time zone: UTC+01:00 (CET)
  - Summer (DST): UTC+02:00 (CEST)
- INSEE/Postal code: 33101 /33390
- ^{1} French Land Register data, which excludes lakes, ponds, glaciers > 1 km^{2} (0.386 sq mi or 247 acres) and river estuaries.

Cartelègue (French pronunciation: [kaʁtəlɛɡ]; Occitan: Quartalèga) is a commune in the Gironde department in Nouvelle-Aquitaine in southwestern France.

== Population ==
Historical population
Year	Pop.	±% p.a.
1968	747	—
1975	687	−1.19%
1982	1,064	+6.45%
1990	829	−3.07%
1999	874	+0.59%
2007	1,019	+1.94%
2012	1,187	+3.10%
2017	1,244	+0.94%
2023	1,334	+1.17%
Source: INSEE

== See also ==
- Communes of the Gironde department
