= Saint-Seurin-de-Bourg =

Saint-Seurin-de-Bourg Sent Seurin de Borg (Occitan)
- Commune
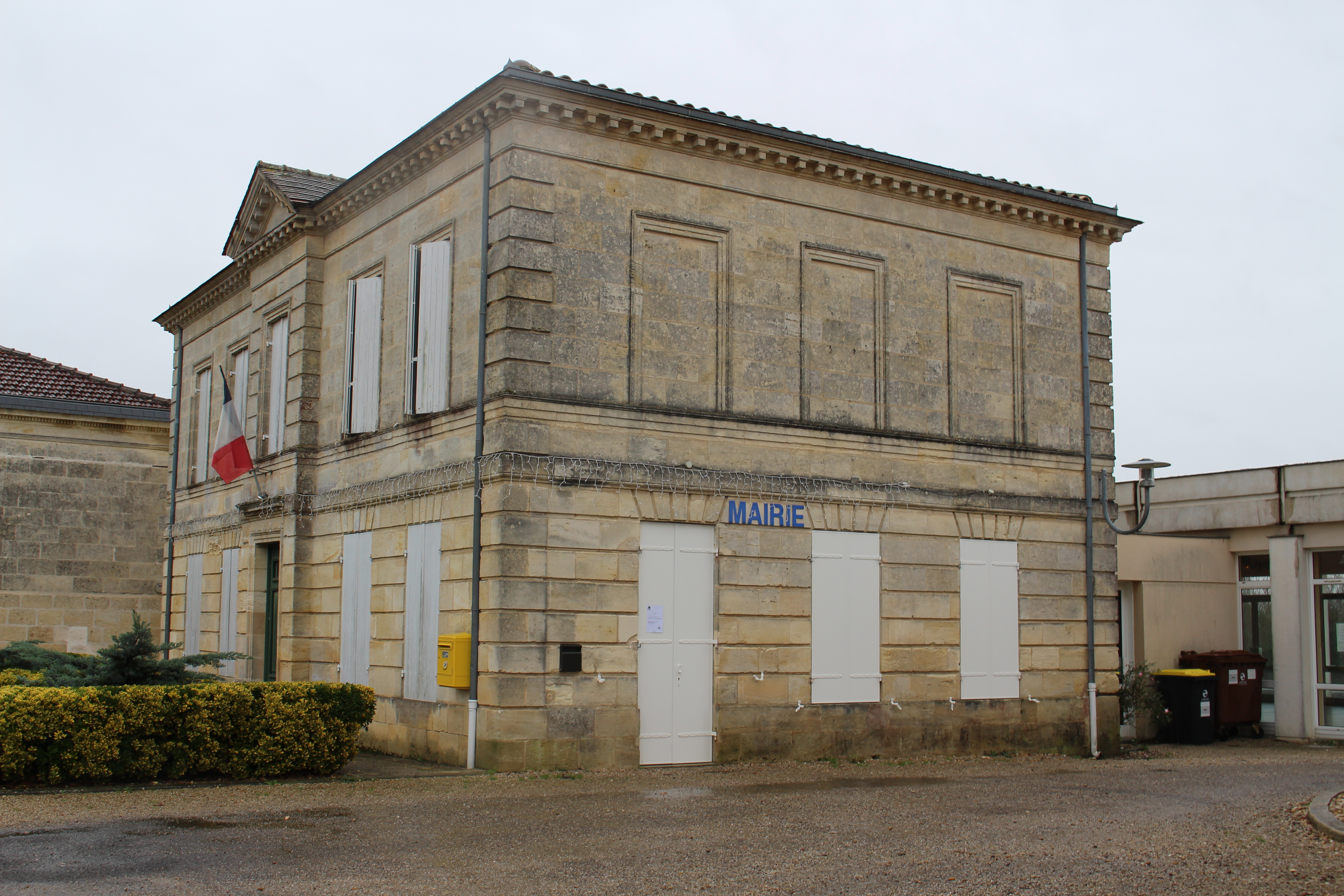
- The town hall in Saint-Seurin-de-Bourg
- Location of Saint-Seurin-de-Bourg
- Location within France Location within Nouvelle-Aquitaine
- Coordinates: 45°03′00″N 0°34′57″W
- Country: France
- Region: Nouvelle-Aquitaine
- Department: Gironde
- Arrondissement: Blaye
- Canton: L'Estuaire
- Intercommunality: Blaye

Government
  - Mayor (2020–2026): Daniel Besson
- Area^{1}: 2.47 km^{2} (0.95 sq mi)
- Elevation: 58 m (190 ft)
- Highest elevation: 86 m (282 ft)
- Lowest elevation: 0 m (0 ft)
- Population (2023): 414
  - Density: 168/km^{2} (434/sq mi)
- Time zone: UTC+01:00 (CET)
  - Summer (DST): UTC+02:00 (CEST)
- INSEE/Postal code: 33475 /33710
- ^{1} French Land Register data, which excludes lakes, ponds, glaciers > 1 km^{2} (0.386 sq mi or 247 acres) and river estuaries.

Saint-Seurin-de-Bourg (French: [sɛ̃ sœʁɛ̃ də buʁ]; Gascon: Sent Seurin de Borg; lit. 'Saint-Seurin of Bourg') is a commune in the Gironde department in Nouvelle-Aquitaine in southwestern France.

== Population ==
Historical population
Year	Pop.	±% p.a.
1968	356	—
1975	362	+0.24%
1982	364	+0.08%
1990	293	−2.68%
1999	352	+2.06%
2007	324	−1.03%
2012	368	+2.58%
2017	404	+1.88%
2023	414	+0.41%
Source: INSEE

== See also ==
- Communes of the Gironde department
