= Bayon-sur-Gironde =

- Commune
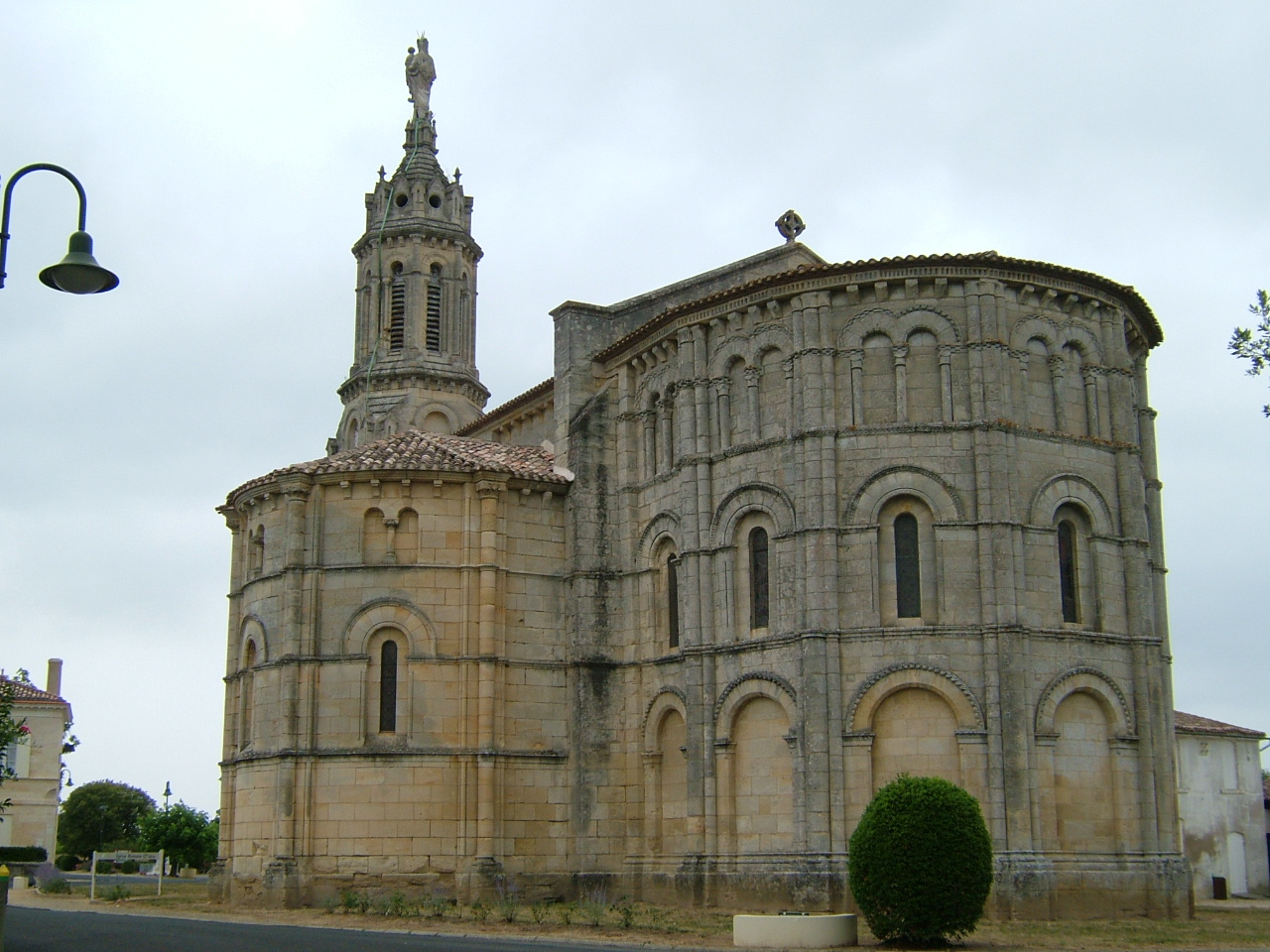
- The church in Bayon-sur-Gironde
- Location of Bayon-sur-Gironde
- Location within France Location within Nouvelle-Aquitaine
- Coordinates: 45°03′17″N 0°35′57″W
- Country: France
- Region: Nouvelle-Aquitaine
- Department: Gironde
- Arrondissement: Blaye
- Canton: L'Estuaire

Government
  - Mayor (2020–2026): Hervé Gayrard
- Area^{1}: 5.7 km^{2} (2.2 sq mi)
- Elevation: 47 m (154 ft)
- Highest elevation: 82 m (269 ft)
- Lowest elevation: 0 m (0 ft)
- Population (2023): 734
  - Density: 130/km^{2} (330/sq mi)
- Time zone: UTC+01:00 (CET)
  - Summer (DST): UTC+02:00 (CEST)
- INSEE/Postal code: 33035 /33710
- ^{1} French Land Register data, which excludes lakes, ponds, glaciers > 1 km^{2} (0.386 sq mi or 247 acres) and river estuaries.

Bayon-sur-Gironde (French pronunciation: [bajɔ̃ syʁ ʒiʁɔ̃d], literally Bayon on Gironde; Occitan: Baion) is a commune in the Gironde department in southwestern France.

== Population ==
Historical population
Year	Pop.	±% p.a.
1968	759	—
1975	746	−0.25%
1982	736	−0.19%
1990	747	+0.19%
1999	747	+0.00%
2007	708	−0.67%
2012	718	+0.28%
2017	704	−0.39%
2023	734	+0.70%
Source: INSEE

== See also ==
- Communes of the Gironde department
