= Canton of L'Estuaire =

Canton of France

Coordinates: 45.13°N 0.66°W

The canton of L'Estuaire is an administrative division of the Gironde department, southwestern France. It was created at the French canton reorganisation which came into effect in March 2015. Its seat is in Blaye.

It consists of the following communes:

1. Anglade
2. Bayon-sur-Gironde
3. Berson
4. Blaye
5. Bourg
6. Braud-et-Saint-Louis
7. Campugnan
8. Cars
9. Cartelègue
10. Comps
11. Étauliers
12. Eyrans
13. Fours
14. Gauriac
15. Lansac
16. Mazion
17. Mombrier
18. Plassac
19. Pleine-Selve
20. Prignac-et-Marcamps
21. Pugnac
22. Reignac
23. Saint-Androny
24. Saint-Aubin-de-Blaye
25. Saint-Ciers-de-Canesse
26. Saint-Ciers-sur-Gironde
27. Saint-Genès-de-Blaye
28. Saint-Martin-Lacaussade
29. Saint-Palais
30. Saint-Paul
31. Saint-Seurin-de-Bourg
32. Saint-Seurin-de-Cursac
33. Saint-Trojan
34. Samonac
35. Tauriac
36. Teuillac
37. Val-de-Livenne
38. Villeneuve
