= Reignac, Gironde =

Reignac
- Commune
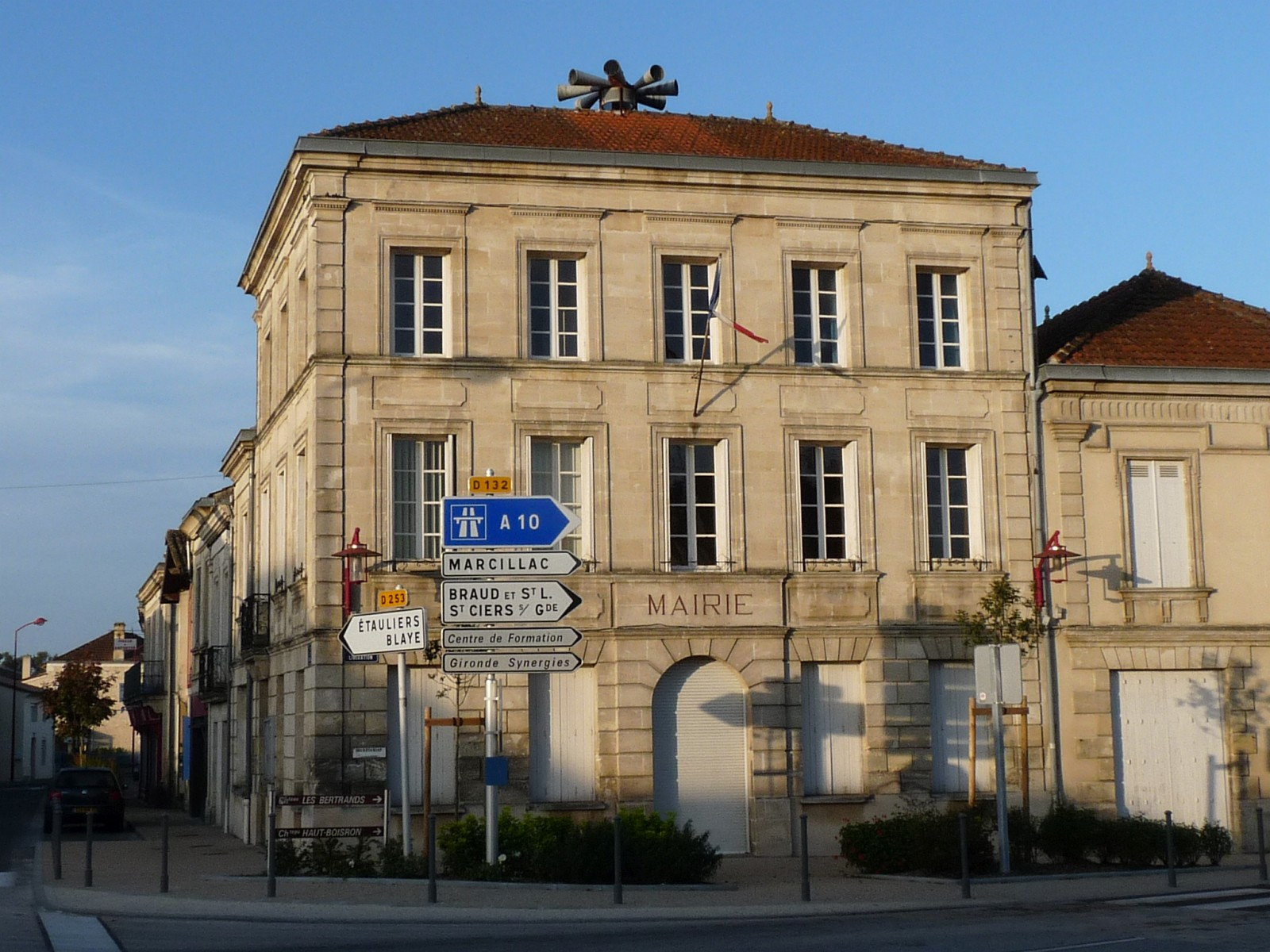
- Town hall
- Location of Reignac
- Location within France Location within Nouvelle-Aquitaine
- Coordinates: 45°14′05″N 0°30′22″W
- Country: France
- Region: Nouvelle-Aquitaine
- Department: Gironde
- Arrondissement: Blaye
- Canton: L'Estuaire
- Intercommunality: Estuaire

Government
  - Mayor (2020–2026): Pierre Renou
- Area^{1}: 37.43 km^{2} (14.45 sq mi)
- Elevation: 62 m (203 ft)
- Highest elevation: 65 m (213 ft)
- Lowest elevation: 7 m (23 ft)
- Population (2023): 1,628
  - Density: 43.49/km^{2} (112.7/sq mi)
- Time zone: UTC+01:00 (CET)
  - Summer (DST): UTC+02:00 (CEST)
- INSEE/Postal code: 33351 /33860
- ^{1} French Land Register data, which excludes lakes, ponds, glaciers > 1 km^{2} (0.386 sq mi or 247 acres) and river estuaries.

Reignac (French pronunciation: [ʁɛɲak]; Occitan: Reinhac) is a commune in the Gironde department in Nouvelle-Aquitaine in southwestern France.

== Population ==
Historical population
Year	Pop.	±% p.a.
1968	1,352	—
1975	1,267	−0.92%
1982	1,206	−0.70%
1990	1,263	+0.58%
1999	1,197	−0.59%
2007	1,380	+1.79%
2012	1,432	+0.74%
2017	1,599	+2.23%
2023	1,628	+0.30%
Source: INSEE

== See also ==
- Communes of the Gironde department
