= Braud-et-Saint-Louis =

- Commune
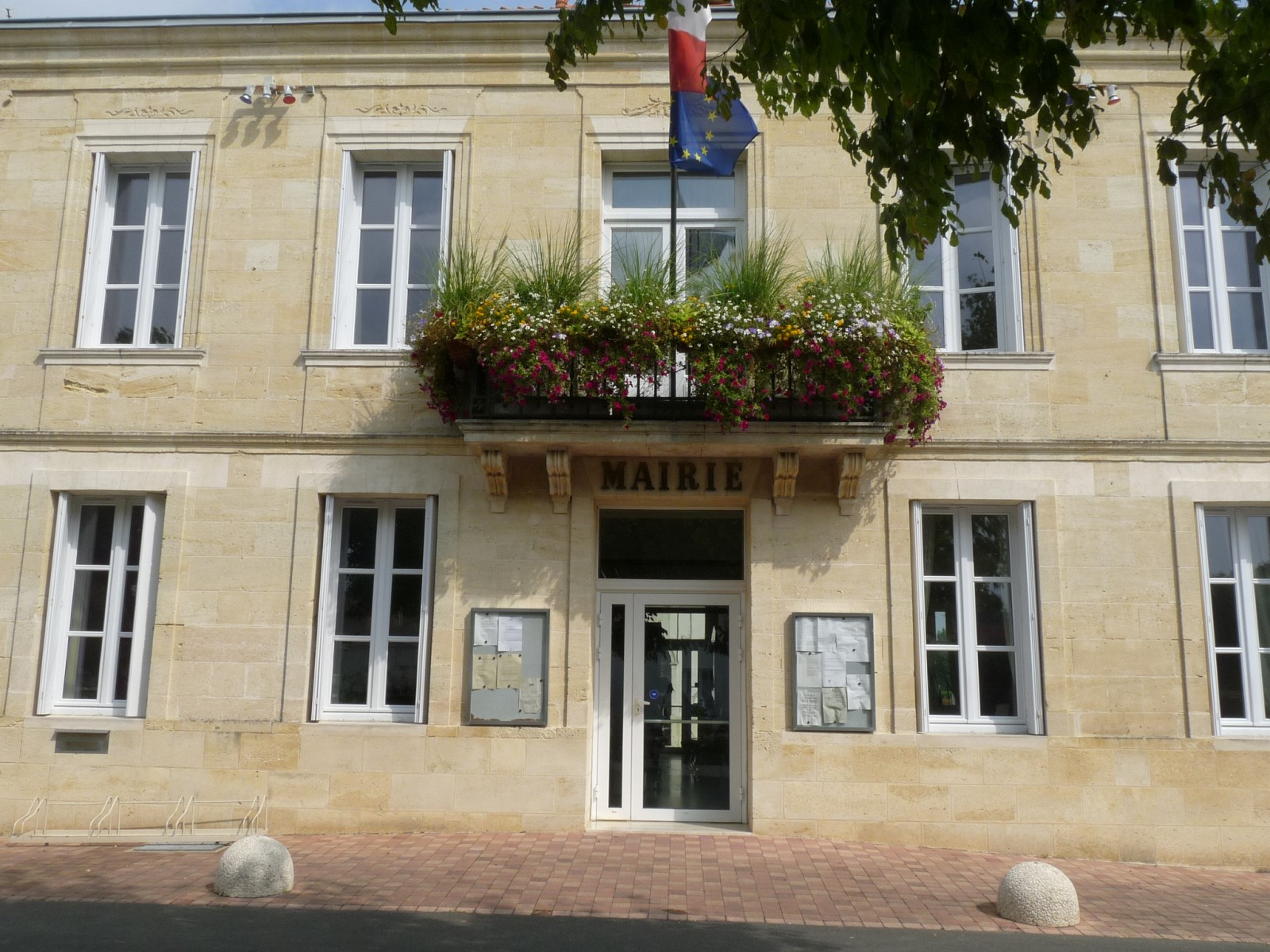
- Town hall

- Coat of arms
- Location of Braud-et-Saint-Louis
- Location within France Location within Nouvelle-Aquitaine
- Coordinates: 45°14′55″N 0°37′26″W
- Country: France
- Region: Nouvelle-Aquitaine
- Department: Gironde
- Arrondissement: Blaye
- Canton: L'Estuaire
- Intercommunality: Estuaire

Government
  - Mayor (2020–2026): Jean-Michel Rigal
- Area^{1}: 49.24 km^{2} (19.01 sq mi)
- Elevation: 10 m (33 ft)
- Highest elevation: 29 m (95 ft)
- Lowest elevation: 0 m (0 ft)
- Population (2023): 1,527
  - Density: 31.01/km^{2} (80.32/sq mi)
- Time zone: UTC+01:00 (CET)
  - Summer (DST): UTC+02:00 (CEST)
- INSEE/Postal code: 33073 /33820
- ^{1} French Land Register data, which excludes lakes, ponds, glaciers > 1 km^{2} (0.386 sq mi or 247 acres) and river estuaries.

Braud-et-Saint-Louis (French pronunciation: [bʁo e sɛ̃ lwi]) is a commune in the Gironde department in Nouvelle-Aquitaine in southwestern France.

== Population ==
Historical population
Year	Pop.	±% p.a.
1968	1,041	—
1975	991	−0.70%
1982	1,753	+8.49%
1990	1,260	−4.04%
1999	1,305	+0.39%
2007	1,368	+0.59%
2012	1,486	+1.67%
2017	1,605	+1.55%
2023	1,527	−0.83%
Source: INSEE

== See also ==
- Communes of the Gironde department
