= Tauriac, Gironde =

Tauriac
- Commune
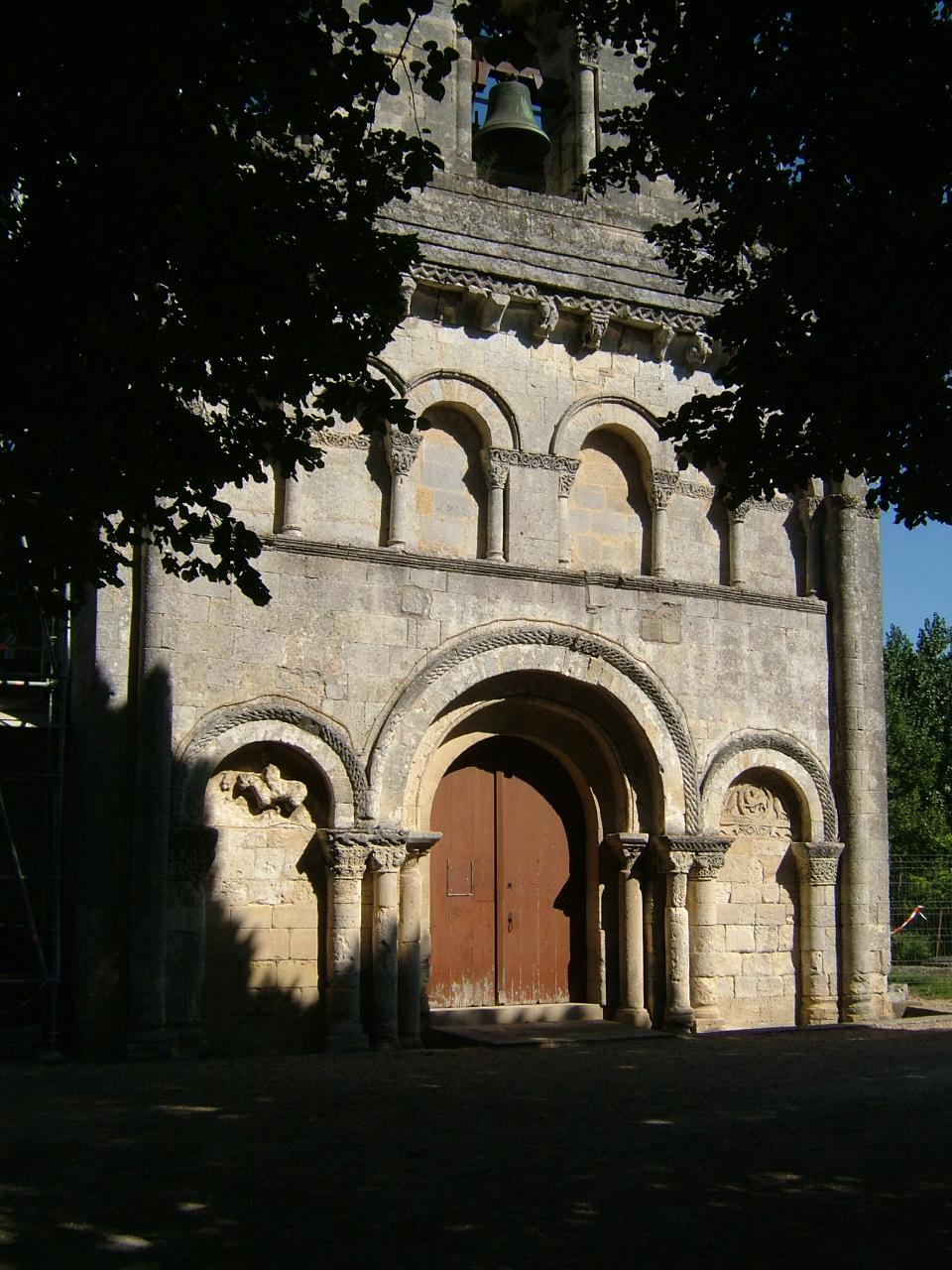
- The church doors in Tauriac

- Coat of arms
- Location of Tauriac
- Location within France Location within Nouvelle-Aquitaine
- Coordinates: 45°03′00″N 0°30′05″W
- Country: France
- Region: Nouvelle-Aquitaine
- Department: Gironde
- Arrondissement: Blaye
- Canton: L'Estuaire
- Intercommunality: Grand Cubzaguais

Government
  - Mayor (2020–2026): Roger Taris
- Area^{1}: 10.51 km^{2} (4.06 sq mi)
- Elevation: 20 m (66 ft)
- Highest elevation: 46 m (151 ft)
- Lowest elevation: 1 m (3.3 ft)
- Population (2023): 1,342
  - Density: 127.7/km^{2} (330.7/sq mi)
- Time zone: UTC+01:00 (CET)
  - Summer (DST): UTC+02:00 (CEST)
- INSEE/Postal code: 33525 /33710
- ^{1} French Land Register data, which excludes lakes, ponds, glaciers > 1 km^{2} (0.386 sq mi or 247 acres) and river estuaries.

Tauriac (French pronunciation: [toʁjak]) is a commune in the Gironde department in Nouvelle-Aquitaine in southwestern France.

== Population ==
Historical population
Year	Pop.	±% p.a.
1968	978	—
1975	972	−0.09%
1982	1,233	+3.46%
1990	1,261	+0.28%
1999	1,293	+0.28%
2007	1,297	+0.04%
2012	1,302	+0.08%
2017	1,289	−0.20%
2023	1,342	+0.67%
Source: INSEE

== See also ==
- Communes of the Gironde department
