= Étauliers =

- Commune
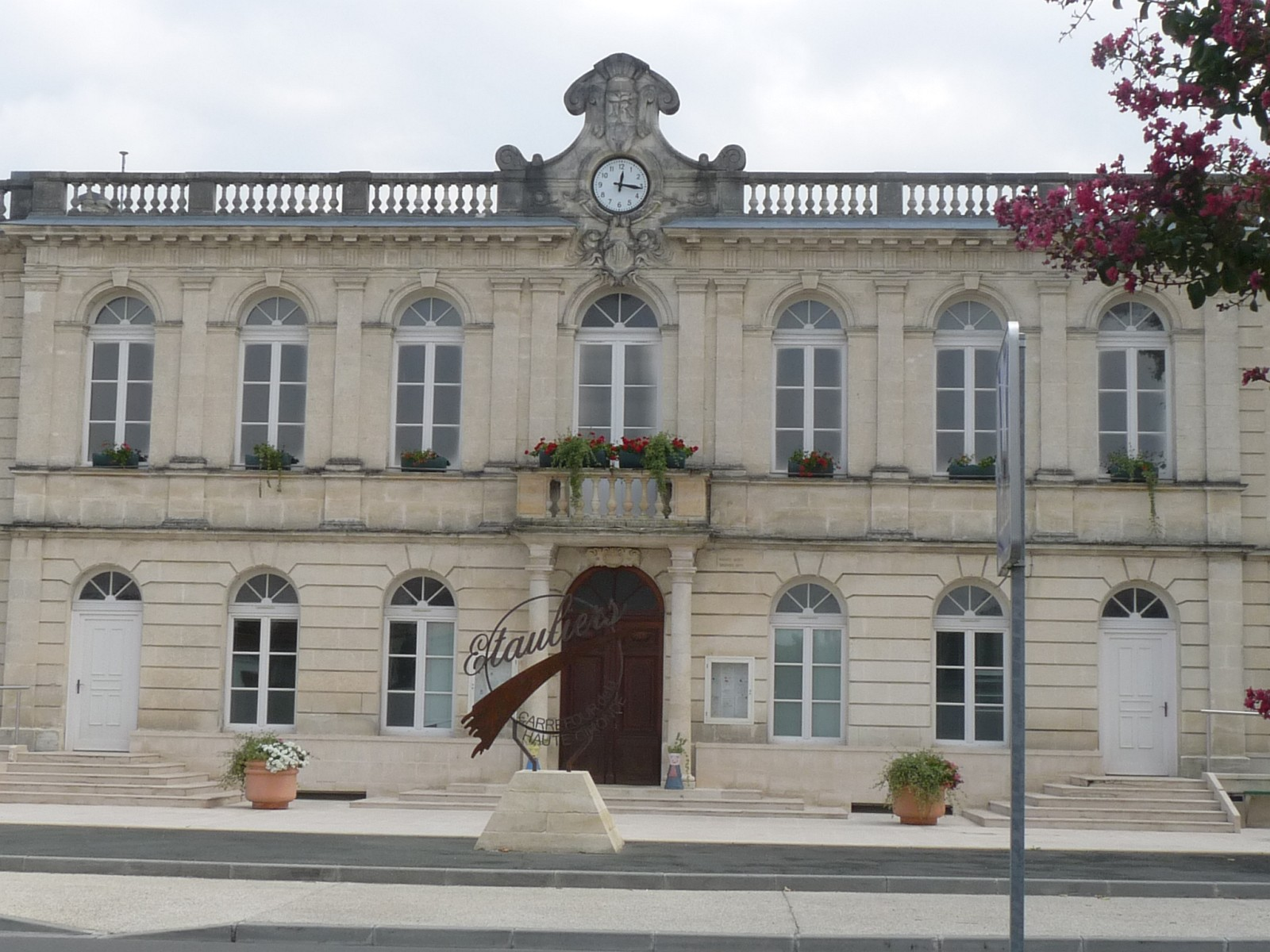
- Town hall
- Location of Étauliers
- Location within France Location within Nouvelle-Aquitaine
- Coordinates: 45°13′29″N 0°34′21″W
- Country: France
- Region: Nouvelle-Aquitaine
- Department: Gironde
- Arrondissement: Blaye
- Canton: L'Estuaire
- Intercommunality: L'Estuaire

Government
  - Mayor (2020–2026): Louis Cavaleiro
- Area^{1}: 12.98 km^{2} (5.01 sq mi)
- Elevation: 7 m (23 ft)
- Highest elevation: 23 m (75 ft)
- Lowest elevation: 1 m (3.3 ft)
- Population (2023): 1,662
  - Density: 128.0/km^{2} (331.6/sq mi)
- Time zone: UTC+01:00 (CET)
  - Summer (DST): UTC+02:00 (CEST)
- INSEE/Postal code: 33159 /33820
- ^{1} French Land Register data, which excludes lakes, ponds, glaciers > 1 km^{2} (0.386 sq mi or 247 acres) and river estuaries.

Étauliers (French pronunciation: [etolje]; Occitan: Venedors) is a commune in the Gironde department in southwestern France.

== Population ==
Historical population
Year	Pop.	±% p.a.
1968	816	—
1975	760	−1.01%
1982	1,513	+10.34%
1990	1,294	−1.94%
1999	1,394	+0.83%
2007	1,437	+0.38%
2012	1,499	+0.85%
2017	1,493	−0.08%
2023	1,662	+1.80%
Source: INSEE

== Twinning ==
SInce January 2012, the commune of Étauliers has been twinned with Plougrescant, a commune in Côtes-d'Armor, Brittany.

== See also ==
- Communes of the Gironde department
