= Saint-Ciers-de-Canesse =

- Commune
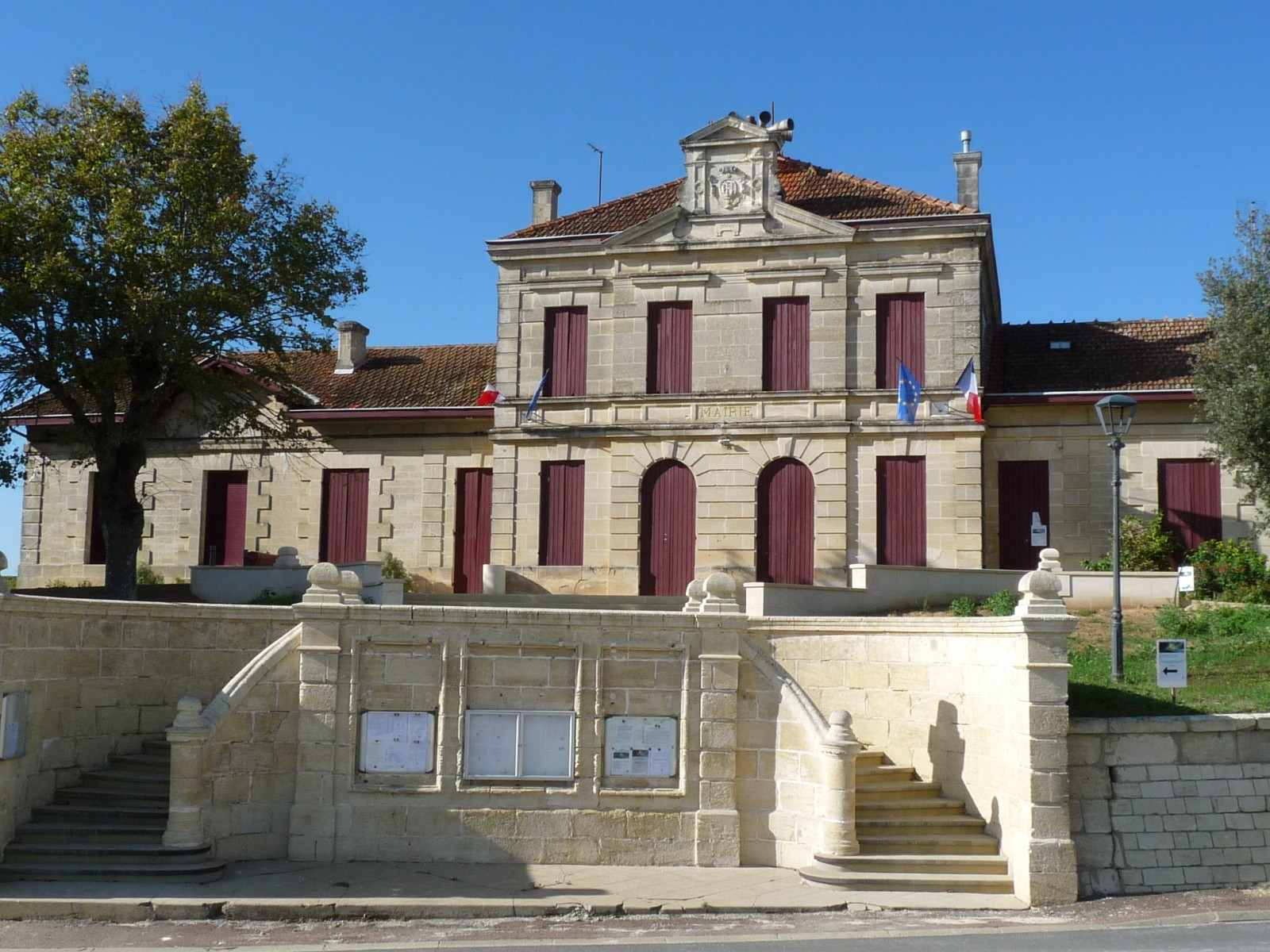
- The town hall in Saint-Ciers-de-Canesse
- Location of Saint-Ciers-de-Canesse
- Location within France Location within Nouvelle-Aquitaine
- Coordinates: 45°05′04″N 0°36′29″W
- Country: France
- Region: Nouvelle-Aquitaine
- Department: Gironde
- Arrondissement: Blaye
- Canton: L'Estuaire
- Intercommunality: Blaye

Government
  - Mayor (2020–2026): Serge Robin
- Area^{1}: 6.8 km^{2} (2.6 sq mi)
- Elevation: 60 m (200 ft)
- Highest elevation: 87 m (285 ft)
- Lowest elevation: 5 m (16 ft)
- Population (2023): 746
  - Density: 110/km^{2} (280/sq mi)
- Time zone: UTC+01:00 (CET)
  - Summer (DST): UTC+02:00 (CEST)
- INSEE/Postal code: 33388 /33710
- ^{1} French Land Register data, which excludes lakes, ponds, glaciers > 1 km^{2} (0.386 sq mi or 247 acres) and river estuaries.

Saint-Ciers-de-Canesse (French pronunciation: [sɛ̃ sje də kanɛs]; Occitan: Sent Circ de Caneça) is a commune in the Gironde department in Nouvelle-Aquitaine in southwestern France.

== Population ==
Historical population
Year	Pop.	±% p.a.
1968	635	—
1975	649	+0.31%
1982	714	+1.37%
1990	713	−0.02%
1999	718	+0.08%
2007	779	+1.02%
2012	804	+0.63%
2017	825	+0.52%
2023	746	−1.66%
Source: INSEE

== See also ==
- Communes of the Gironde department
