= Castle Site of Montbazon =

Fortified structure in France

- Forteresse de Montbazon
- Montbazon, Indre-et-Loire, Centre-Val de Loire in France
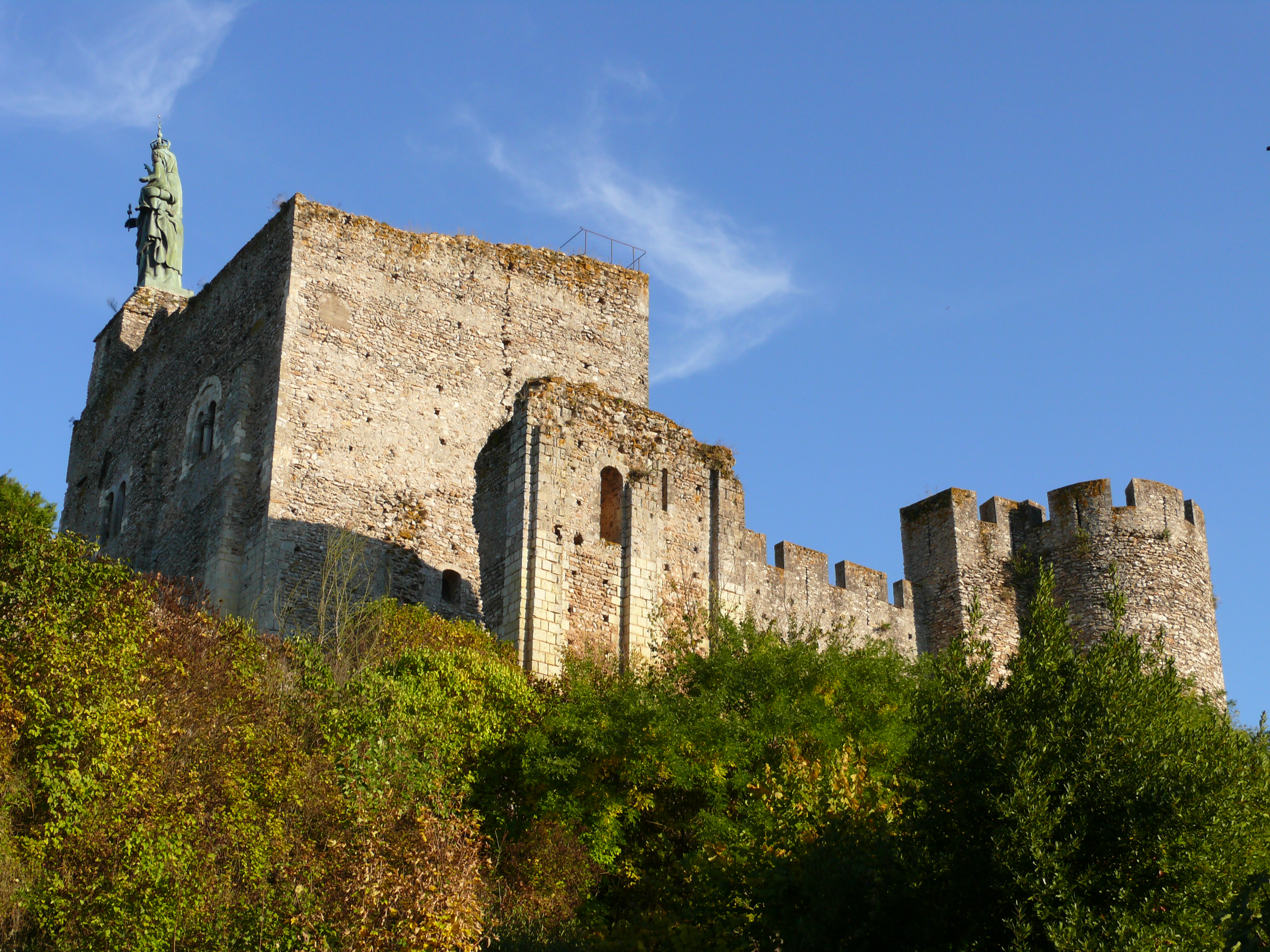
- Main tower and forebuilding.

Site information
- Type: Fortification
- Owner: Fulk Nerra
- Open to the public: 15th century

Location
- Coordinates: 47°17′06″N 0°42′50″E

Site history
- Built: 10th or 11th century
- Built for: Residence
- Fate: Touristic site

Garrison information
- Designations: Listed MH (1926, 2012, keep, castral site); Classified MH (2024)

The castle site of Montbazon comprises a series of fortified structures situated within the French commune of Montbazon, located in the department of Indre-et-Loire and the Centre-Val de Loire region.

The site overlooks the Indre valley and controls both land and river routes. The development of the site is believed to have begun in the late 10th or early 11th century with the construction of a keep (donjon), which is generally attributed to Fulk Nerra. This development occurred at the edge of a rocky promontory that overlooked the valley. The tower construction was part of the power struggle between the houses of Blois and Anjou in this part of Touraine. Subsequently, the tower was augmented with the construction of an outwork, a curtain wall, and two enclosures, which were erected to safeguard the entire site. These additions were made for several centuries, from the early 11th to the 15th century. A Renaissance castle was constructed in the 15th century, and notable figures (Louis VII, Louis XI, Catherine de' Medici, and Henry of Navarre) resided there for varying periods. However, the castle was ultimately destroyed a little more than three centuries later due to extensive dilapidation while uninhabited. The seigniorial chapel and a portion of the enclosure also suffered a similar fate.

Since the French Revolution, modifications and restorations have been carried out by successive owners, notably William Perry Dudley from 1922 to the late 1950s and the Atterton couple in the 2000s. However, most modifications and restorations were carried out from the 20th century onwards. In the 21st century, the keep, which still stands at a height of 28 meters, remains the most significant feature of this site open to the public. However, the ongoing collapse of the hillside is causing concern due to its potential impact on the stability of the promontory's edge and the houses constructed on the lower slopes.

The keep was initially designated a historic monument by a decree on 28 October 1926. Subsequently, on 24 May 2012, the protection was extended to encompass the entire castle site, which has been accessible to the public since 2003. A subsequent classification decree of 11 May 2024, replaced the 1926 listing.

== Location ==
Castral enclosure and surroundings.

The castle site is located on a promontory fort in the commune of Montbazon, in the French department of Indre-et-Loire. The site is protected on two sides by the valleys of the Indre and the Gironde, which together form a small temporary tributary that also serves as the moat for the town's enclosure.

This location enables the regulation of the Indre crossing by the Tours-Poitiers road, situated at the foot of the promontory, and the river navigation. Subsequently, a village emerged at the foot of the promontory on the left bank of the river, which was soon complemented by a suburb on the right bank, situated between two arms of the Indre. In the 10th and 11th centuries, Montbazon was in a geographically strategic area coveted by both the Counts of Anjou and the Counts of Blois. The construction of a chain of fortresses was intended to allow the former to secure control over all of Touraine. In this respect, Montbazon, approximately ten kilometers from Tours on the road leading south to France, was ideally located.

== History ==
=== Studies and research ===
Schematic plan of the fortress.

In the 16th century, the construction of the keep was attributed to Julius Caesar. (Note: The hypothesis of the site's occupation during pre-Roman times is suggested but unverified. (Note: Maurice 1976, p. 16, Les origines)) At that time, large ancient constructions were generally considered the work of a powerful and prestigious civilization, that of the Romans, personified by its most famous representative. (Note: Maurice 1976, p. 29, Le donjon et ses seigneurs) One of the first studies tracing the history and archaeology of the keep was published by Louis Bousrez in 1895 in Bulletin de la Société archéologique de Touraine.

In 1969, medieval historian Marcel Deyres provided a precise description of the keep's structures in the Cahiers de civilisation médiévale. This study allowed him to propose a construction timeline for the fortress. However, ten years later, Bernard Bachrach challenged the hypothesis of an original wooden keep built on a mound, which had been suggested by Deyres. (Note: Dalayeun 2003, p. 13, État des recherches sur les tours maîtresses en Touraine aux XIe et XIIe siècles, vol. I)

In 2002, fortification historian Nicolas Faucherre published a lengthy article in the Bulletin des amis du pays lochois, wherein he advanced novel hypotheses regarding the construction chronology of the entire castle site (keep and adjoining structures). However, he acknowledged that his conclusions represented primarily research avenues that did not integrate the findings of ongoing university studies.

The latest research on the castles at Loches (dendrochronological studies) and Langeais, comparable to Montbazon, and the architectural analysis of the Montbazon castle site conducted by Marie-Denise Dalayeun from 2002 as part of her academic work have enabled the formulation of a revised construction timeline for the site and a new interpretation of the functionality of the various buildings. These findings challenge and replace the conclusions of earlier studies. The same archaeologist continued her excavations and investigations until 2015.

Although the relative chronology of the site (the order of successive construction or remodeling phases) appears to be well-established, the absolute chronology (precise dating of these phases) remains to be defined, particularly for the medieval period, which is poorly documented by written sources. The proposals put forth remain open to discussion. These uncertainties are also linked to the numerous repair and restoration campaigns that affected the keep in particular, resulting in the erasure of part of its ancient structures. (Note: Dalayeun 2003, p. 86, Conclusion, vol. I) Furthermore, the lack of wooden remains at Montbazon precludes the possibility of employing a dendrochronological approach. (Note: Dalayeun 2003, p. 51, Diagrammes stratigraphiques et chronologie relative, vol. I)

=== 10th and 11th centuries: Birth of the castle complex ===
A simplified timeline of the construction phases of the castle complex: Late 10th or early 11th century Elevation in the early 11th century Second half of the 11th century 13th century 19th and 20th centuries

Towards the end of the 10th or early 11th century, a multitude of defensive structures were erected in the Loire Valley amidst the power struggles between the counts of Anjou and the counts of Blois. These structures typically comprised a mound surmounted by a keep, which was most often constructed from wood. It seems plausible that a similar system may have existed at Montbazon, situated on the site of the medieval keep. During the subsequent reconstruction of the fortress, stone was employed in place of wood. According to a charter by Robert II the Pious, written between 996 and 1006, the builder of the structure in question could have been Fulk Nerra, who constructed a castellum on land belonging to the Abbey of Saint-Paul de Cormery without prior authorization.

A second scenario is also a viable hypothesis that has gained support through recent research. The initial construction of the Montbazon castle site was a stone keep. The structure was 20 meters long by 15 meters wide and initially comprised two levels. It seems highly probable that this can be attributed to Fulk Nerra, before the stronghold's conquest by the House of Blois. The keep was promptly reinforced on its southern side with a substantial addition of earth, forming an "emplacement." Contrary to popular belief, the keep was not constructed on a mound; rather, the mound was subsequently incorporated to safeguard the base of the tower. (Note: Dalayeun 2003, p. 80, Confort et sécurité, vol. I) Subsequently, between 1020 and 1110, possibly at the instigation of Geoffrey Martel, the son of Fulk Nerra, who had recaptured the fortress from the counts of Blois, this keep was partially destroyed at varying heights according to its sides, then rebuilt with two additional floors, while its base was repaired and an outwork was added to its western face.

=== 12th and 13th centuries: Improvement of the defensive system and construction of a chapel ===
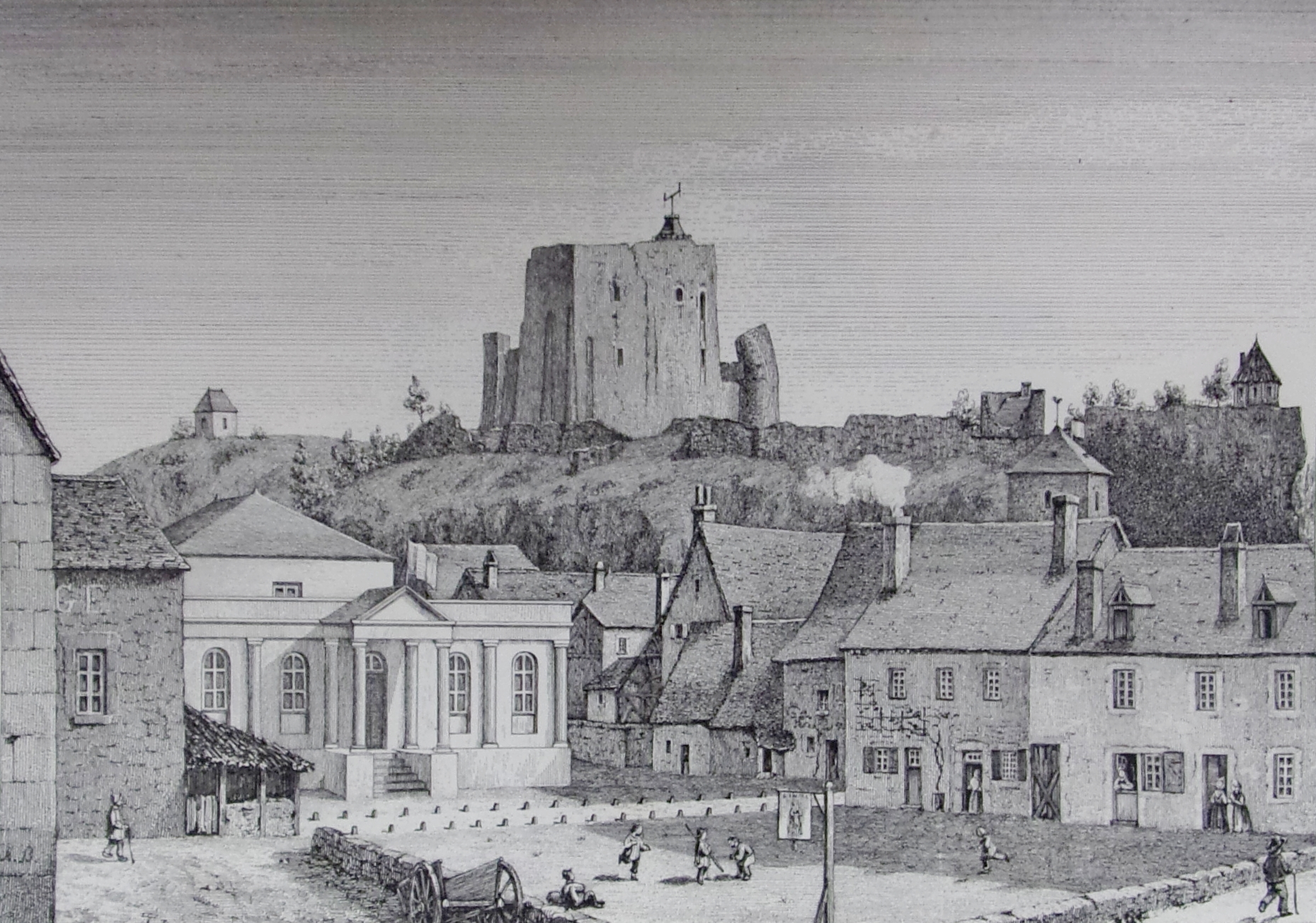
Medieval defensive remains circa 1840 (on the right in the lithograph).

It is probable that during the reign of Henry II Plantagenet, between 1160 and 1180, a ditch was dug to the south of the site, and a curtain wall, apparently constructed with limestone extracted from the ditch, was erected between the ditch and the keep, whose lower floor was subsequently filled in. In this configuration, a walkway at the top of the curtain wall is a plausible hypothesis. A chapel was constructed in the 12th century to the north of the keep, but its foundations partially overlapped an older structure, perhaps from the early 11th century, which may have served a similar function. The fortress was subsequently captured by King Philip Augustus of France at the outset of the 13th century. During this same period, the curtain wall was rebuilt and reinforced at its southwestern corner with the addition of a three-story tower, which came to be known as the "Philip Augustus Tower" or the "Philippian Tower." Additionally, during the 13th century, an enclosure was constructed to the south of the curtain wall, thereby providing supplementary defense for this particularly exposed area. An archaeological survey conducted in 2015 revealed the existence of an enclosure north of the keep, which protected the entire promontory and was datable to the 13th century. This enclosure is likely connected to a tower at the northern tip of the site that collapsed in 2001. Therefore, the 13th century appears to have been a period of significant defensive improvements across the entire site.

=== 15th to 18th century: Ephemeral new castle and fragile keep ===
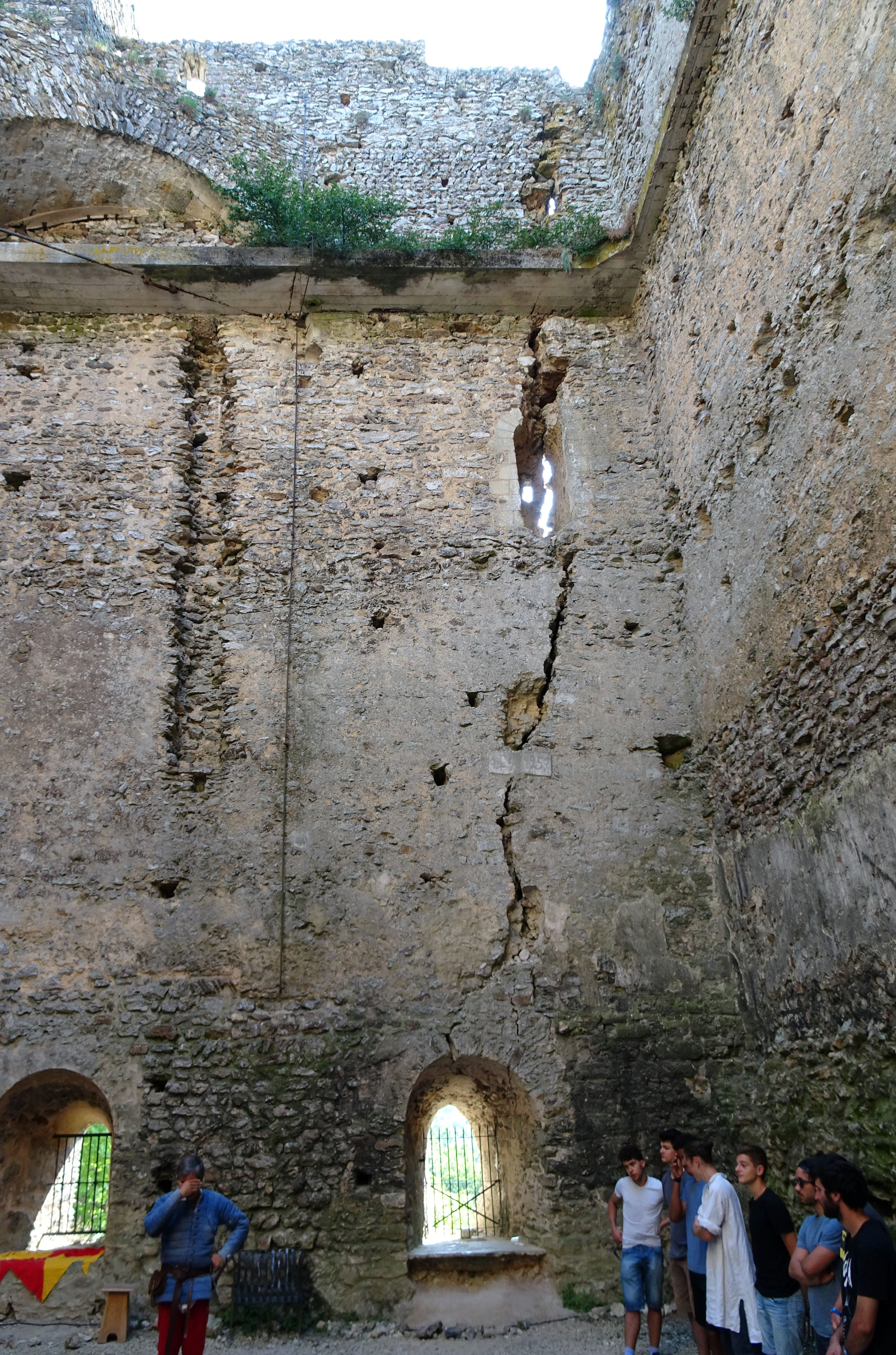
Cracked keep wall.

In approximately 1425, Guy de La Rochefoucauld constructed a castle in opposition to the existing keep. The structure spanned approximately fifty meters in length and twenty meters in width, extending from east to west across the bailey and dividing it into two lower courtyards. No contemporary descriptions or representations clarify the architectural details of the structure. The only vague accounts, gathered orally by Amans-Alexis Monteil at the beginning of the 19th century, mention a "large building with wide mullioned windows." The castle served as a venue for hosting distinguished guests. On 3 November 1450, Antoinette de Maignelais married André de Villequier in the presence of Charles VII, who also spent the winter of 1458–1459 at the castle. Louis XI resided in Montbazon in 1472 and again in 1480. In 1560, Catherine de Medici and François II, accompanied by his wife Mary Stuart, were the guests of Louis VI de Rohan-Guéméné, lord of Montbazon. His son, Louis VII de Rohan-Montbazon, hosted the future Henry IV at the château-neuf in April 1589.

While the castle served as a residence for the lords and their distinguished guests, it also occasionally functioned as a prison. For instance, Cardinal Jean de la Balue, who was convicted of treason against the king, was detained at Montbazon for several months between his arrest on 23 May 1469, in Amboise and his transfer to Onzain in January or February 1470. He was held either in the keep or the château-neuf. (Note: Maurice 1976, pp. 50–51, Le château-neuf et ses visiteurs)

An enclosure was likely constructed in the 15th century, either contemporaneously with or shortly after the château-neuf, to safeguard the lower courtyards situated to the north of the fortress. It was linked to the urban wall and the Porte des Moulins to the east, both of which were erected contemporaneously. The structure included at least two defensive towers, one situated to the north and the other to the west. The latter is believed to correspond to the modern-day Lilian Tower. From the south to the east, it provided a ramp that served as access to the fortress after crossing a drawbridge. It was not until the modern era that a pathway for pedestrians was created to the west. However, the dating of this enclosure was called into question by archaeological diagnostics carried out in 2015, which suggested that it could be older, constructed shortly after the recently discovered 13th-century wall.

In the early 17th century, Hercule de Rohan-Montbazon, the third son of Louis VI, elected to reside at the Château de Couzières in Veigné rather than at the château-neuf. His descendants likewise maintained this practice or resided in the Château de Sainte-Maure-de-Touraine. Due to a lack of financial resources, the château-neuf deteriorated and was ultimately demolished in 1746. The debris from the structure was used as a landfill to reinforce the road to Spain (which later became the RN 10), while the Saint-Georges chapel, situated to the north, and a significant portion of the enclosure were also demolished. However, the keep itself was spared from destruction due to its considerable size, which made it too challenging to dismantle. (Note: Maurice 1976, p. 88, La route d'Espagne)

In December 1790, the castle walls were in a state of disrepair, posing a significant risk of collapse onto the rectory and other residential structures situated below on Rue des Moulins. To ensure public safety, the municipality was granted permission to proceed with the demolition on 6 October 1791. In August 1791, the upper floor of the master tower and a significant portion of the attached forebuilding collapsed. (Note: Maurice 1976, p. 117, La Révolution au jour le jour) Two years later, the inhabitants of Montbazon proceeded to demolish all the crenellations that remained standing on the walls, citing them as "symbols of despotism." (Note: Maurice 1976, p. 123, La Révolution au jour le jour (fin)) In June 1796, the property of immigrants, including the Rohan family, was confiscated and auctioned off. The keep was purchased by a local glazier for 1,000 francs. (Note: Maurice 1976, p. 126, La Révolution au jour le jour (fin)) The following year, the eastern wall of the master tower was cracked from top to bottom by lightning.

=== 19th to 21st century: abandonment and restoration ===
==== From the Chappe telegraph to the statue of the Virgin ====
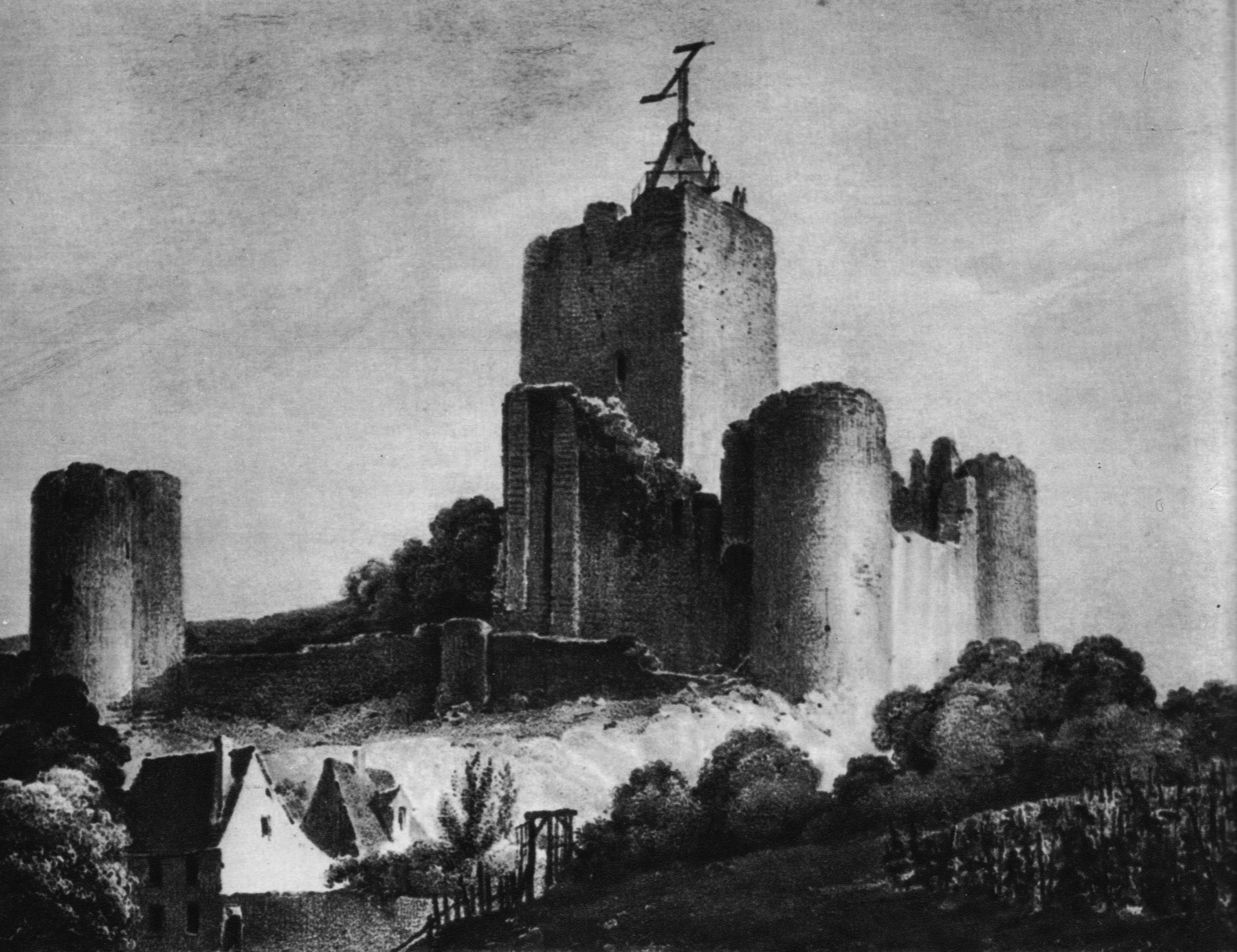
Chappe telegraph.

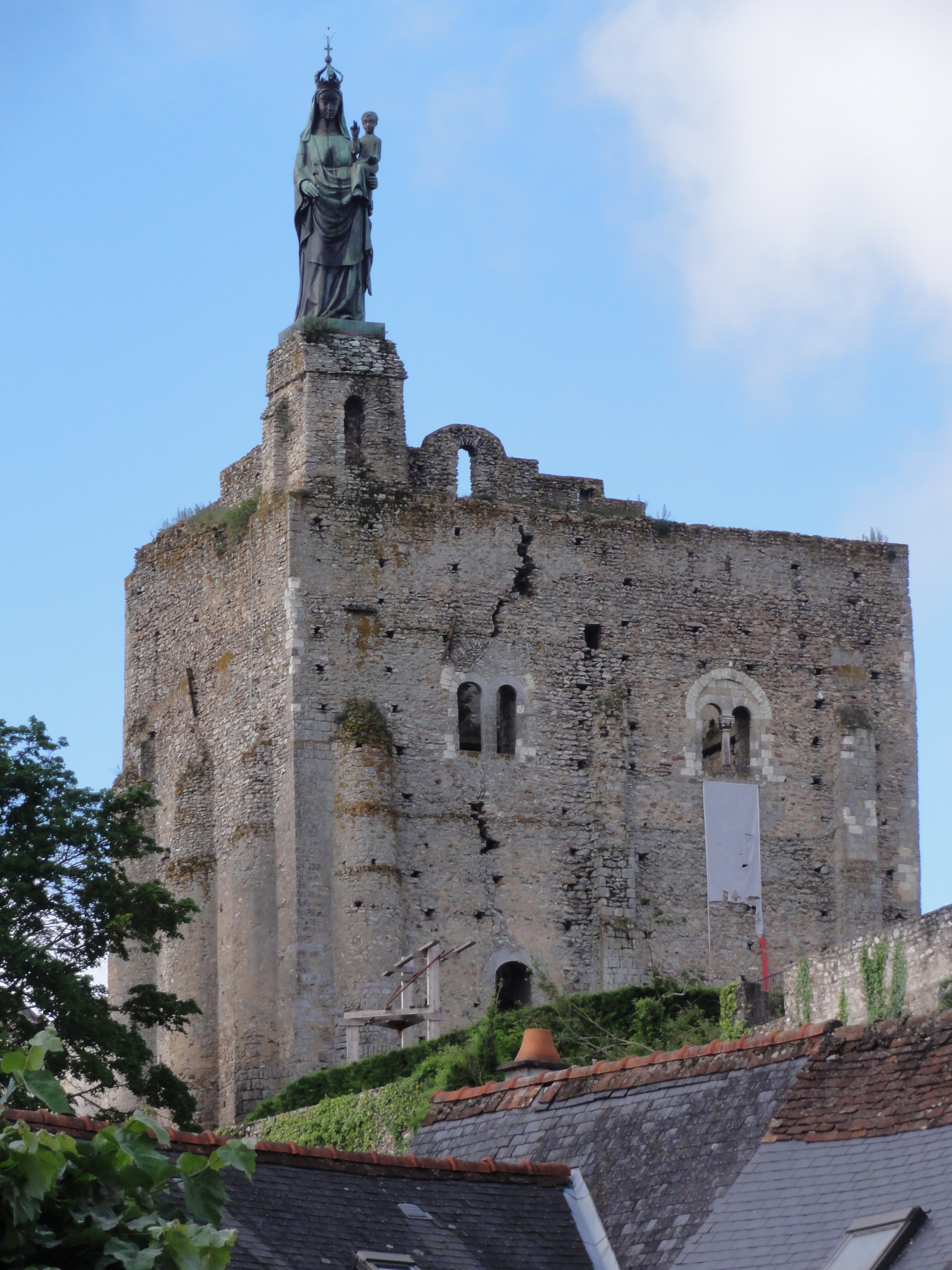
Statue of the Black Madonna.

At the beginning of the nineteenth century, the master tower was repurposed as a simple warehouse. In 1823, its southwest corner hosted the installation of a Chappe telegraph on the Paris-Bayonne line, with a hut also constructed on top of the tower to house the telegraph operator. The electric telegraph replaced it in 1853.

In 1860, the site was purchased by Joseph Delaville Le Roulx and underwent a restoration process. The keep was consolidated to accommodate the installation of a 9.5-meter-tall statue of the Virgin and Child at the northeast corner of its summit. The statue was financed by Empress Eugénie de Montijo at the urging of Abbé Chauvin, the priest of Montbazon. Notwithstanding numerous cautions regarding the structural vulnerability of the building, a masonry vault was erected at the summit of the fourth level to buttress the pedestal supporting the statue. (Note: Dalayeun 2003, p. 65, Les phases V et VI. Les restaurations des phases I à IV, vol. I) The objective was to attract a greater number of pilgrims to Montbazon, which was situated on one of the routes leading to Camino de Santiago. The statue, which was hollow and constructed from riveted copper plates that had been partially filled with stones and concrete, (Note: Maurice 1976, pp. 148–149, Au temps des diligences) was eventually installed in 1866, which was the year of Joseph Delaville Le Roulx's death. Over time, the metal of the statue darkened, giving it the appearance of a black Virgin.

==== Grand works of the "Dudley Era" ====
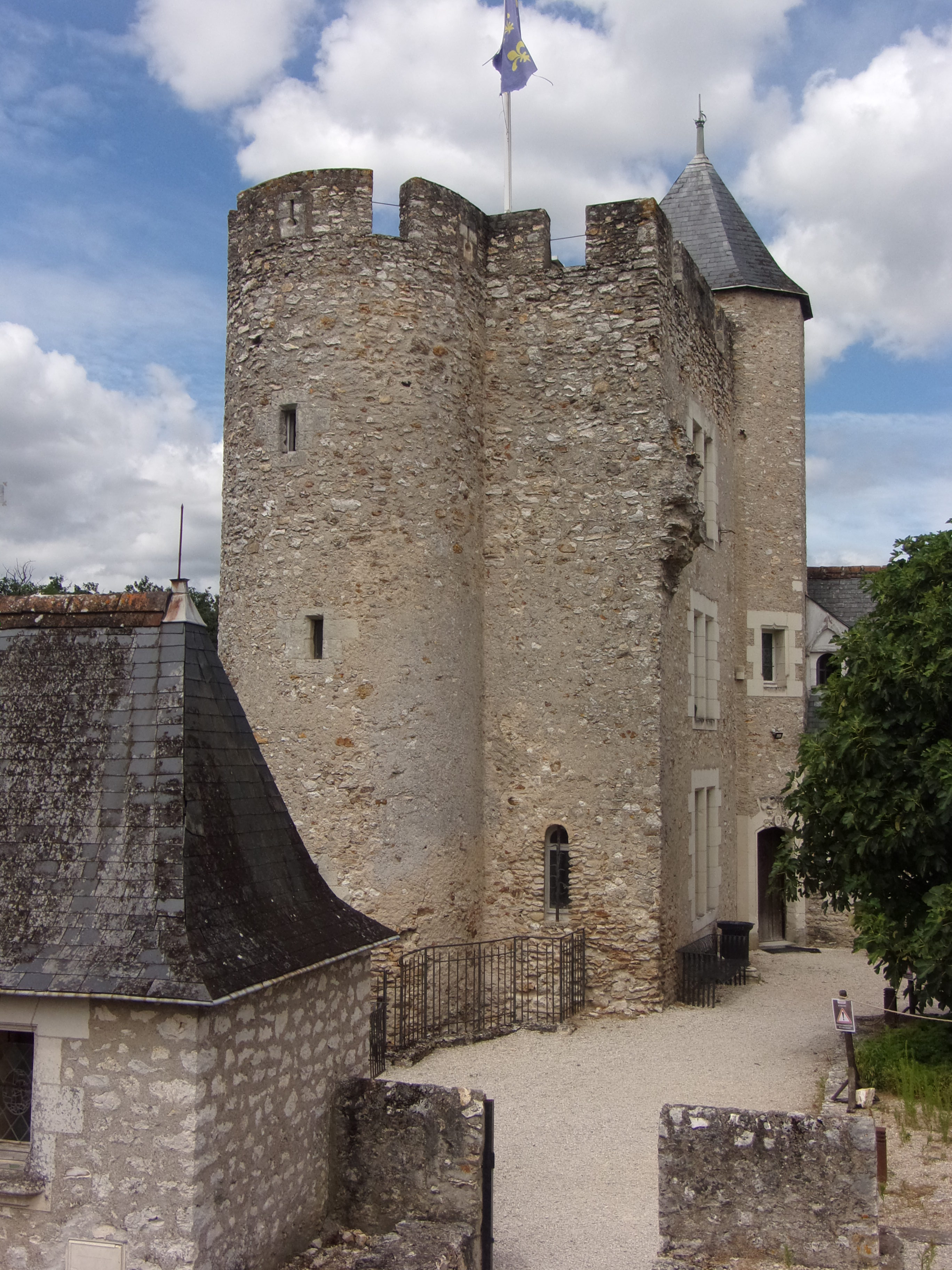
Lilian Tower.

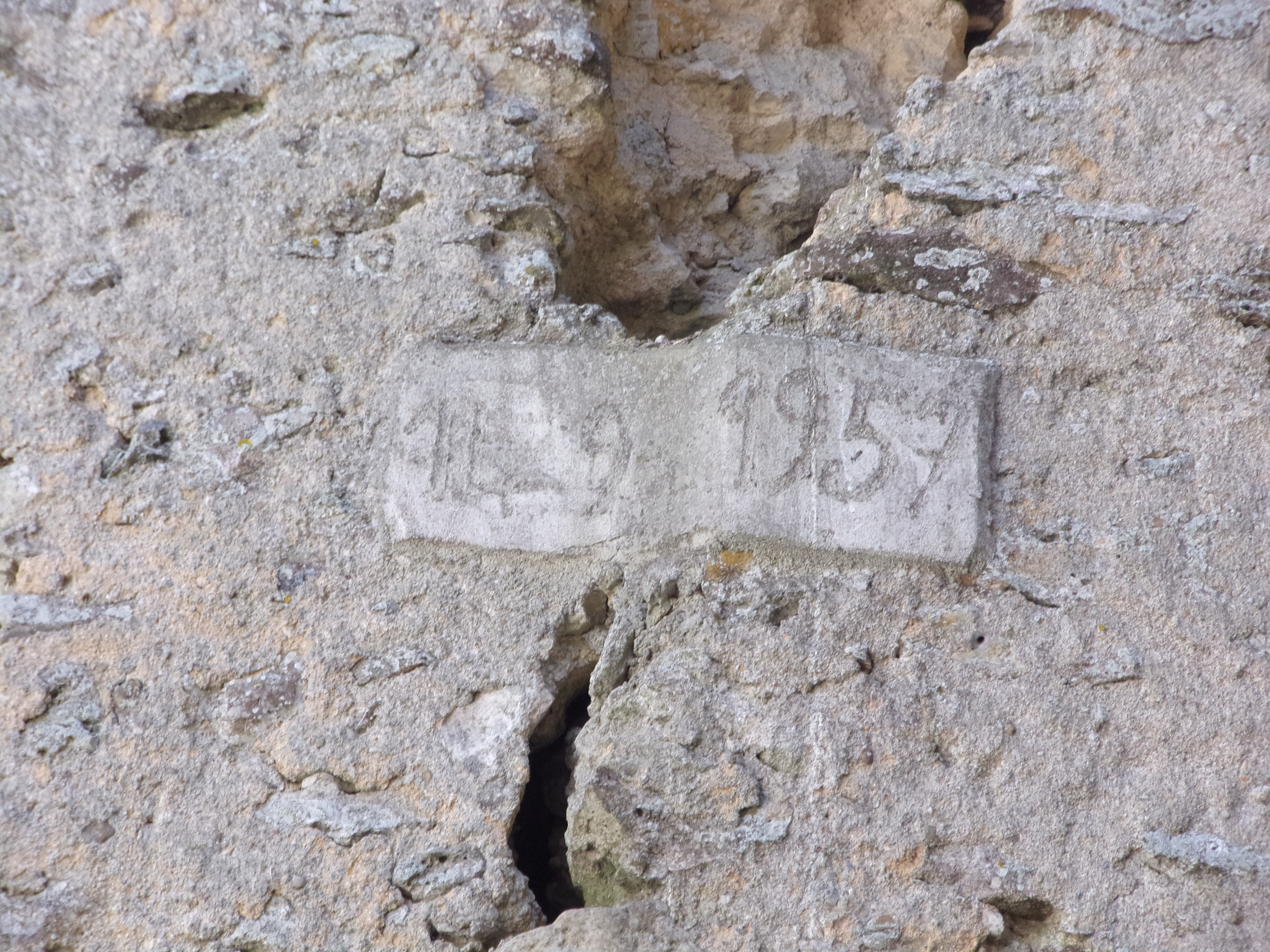
Fissurometer installed in 1957.

On 17 March 1922, William Perry Dudley, an American architect and landscaper, purchased the castle site from Yvonne Dezarrois, the great-niece of Joseph Delaville Le Roulx, (Note: William P. Dudley, a combatant in World War I who had volunteered in the American army, discovered Montbazon and its keep (which was already for sale) while recuperating in Chambray-lès-Tours after sustaining injuries on 12 September 1918, at the Battle of Saint-Mihiel.) for the sum of 9,000 francs. He resided at the castle until 1939, accompanied by his friend Lilian Whitteker, an American painter who continued to live there until 1970. (Note: Upon his arrival in France in February 1922, accompanied by Lilian Whitteker, Dudley embarked on an extensive tour of the southern region of the country. During this period, he visited a multitude of sites, including the city of Carcassonne, which served as a source of inspiration for his subsequent redevelopment and restoration of Montbazon.) Dudley undertook extensive renovations, the cost of which exceeded 127,000 francs and spanned over three decades. In the period following his arrival, Dudley reconstructed a 15th-century tower situated in the western section of the enclosure. This structure, which was subsequently named the "Lilian Tower," was extended eastward with the addition of a residence. Some of the windows were furnished with stained glass from the Lux-Fournier workshop or from older windows that had been salvaged. Additionally, he remodeled the site's access points, added crenellations to the towers, cleared the entrance to the underground passages, and completely redesigned the park, decorating it with statues commissioned by local sculptors or crafted by himself. Additionally, he planted a few rows of vines, a practice documented as early as the nineteenth century, and developed a "Gothic garden" to the south of the master tower. His final project, completed in 1957, entailed consolidating the keep, which was at risk of collapsing due to the weight of the statue, through the construction of an internal concrete support system. Additionally, a crack gauge was installed on the fissure in the eastern wall. This work was undertaken by Dudley on his first and final trip to Montbazon after World War II.

As a result of William Dudley's efforts, the keep was designated a historical monument on 28 October 1926. In 1937, Dudley inaugurated public access to the keep, although visitor numbers remained low.

==== Public access in the 21st century ====
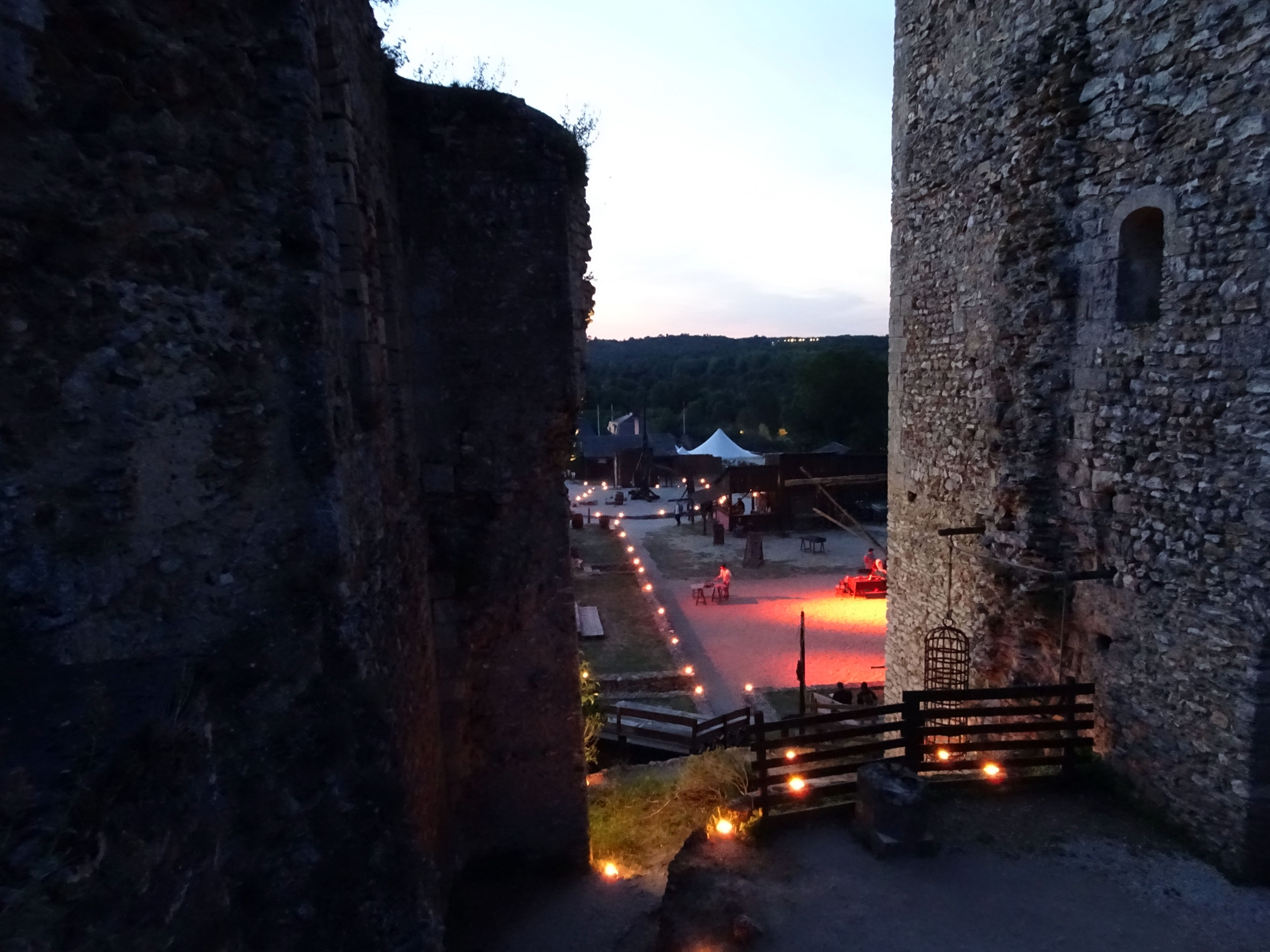
Night-time entertainment.

Five years after Dudley's death in April 1965, following a complex inheritance process, and despite his bequest of the fortress to the town of Montbazon, his second wife and their daughter eventually inherited it. (Note: For five years, the town of Montbazon held the erroneous belief that it was the proprietor of the fortress. This was, in fact, not the case. Furthermore, it was discovered that Lilian Whitteker was occupying the premises without the requisite legal title. Additionally, an association had developed a project in which the castle, previously owned by Montbazon, would become a center for artistic creation, with Lilian Whitteker residing there for the duration of her life at the town's expense. In light of these legal complexities and the financial burden of the project, the recently elected mayor rejected the bequest in 1970.) However, they promptly sought to sell it. By the early 1980s, the site, uninhabited and unsupervised, had been looted. Among the items stolen were statues from the park and stained glass windows from the residence.

In 1999, Harry and Jacqueline Atterton, an Anglo-French couple, purchased the property and initiated an ambitious restoration and enhancement program intending to open it to the public, which they accomplished in 2003. In 2009, a real estate group purchased the fortress and proceeded with the restoration work that had been initiated by the Attertons. Since 2010, the site's promotion and activities have been managed by the "Black Falcon Knights" association, which offers guided tours and workshops on a range of historical subjects, including blacksmithing, herbalism, ancient weaponry, and war machine demonstrations. In 2012, the historical monument listing of the keep was extended to the entire castle site by a decree on 24 May 2012.

== Description ==
The castle was constructed on a spur that extends from south to north, with an elevation of approximately thirty meters above the river. The castle site, separated from the plateau by a substantial artificial ditch excavated during the medieval period, encompasses a substantial stone keep erected in the early 11th century on the site of an earlier motte, (Note: Part of the base of the keep currently remains.) which had previously served to defend the position from attack. Behind it, the promontory extends for 160 meters in length and 60 meters in width, surrounded by a wall rebuilt in the 15th century, enclosing two lower courtyards.

The area in question, encompassing approximately 1.2 hectares, exhibits a topographical range of elevations, from 81.5 meters in the south, near the master tower, to 73.5 meters in the north, at the extremity of the promontory. This range of altitudes could accommodate a garrison, an array of elements associated with a lord's court, or a population facing imminent threat.

=== The medieval castle ===
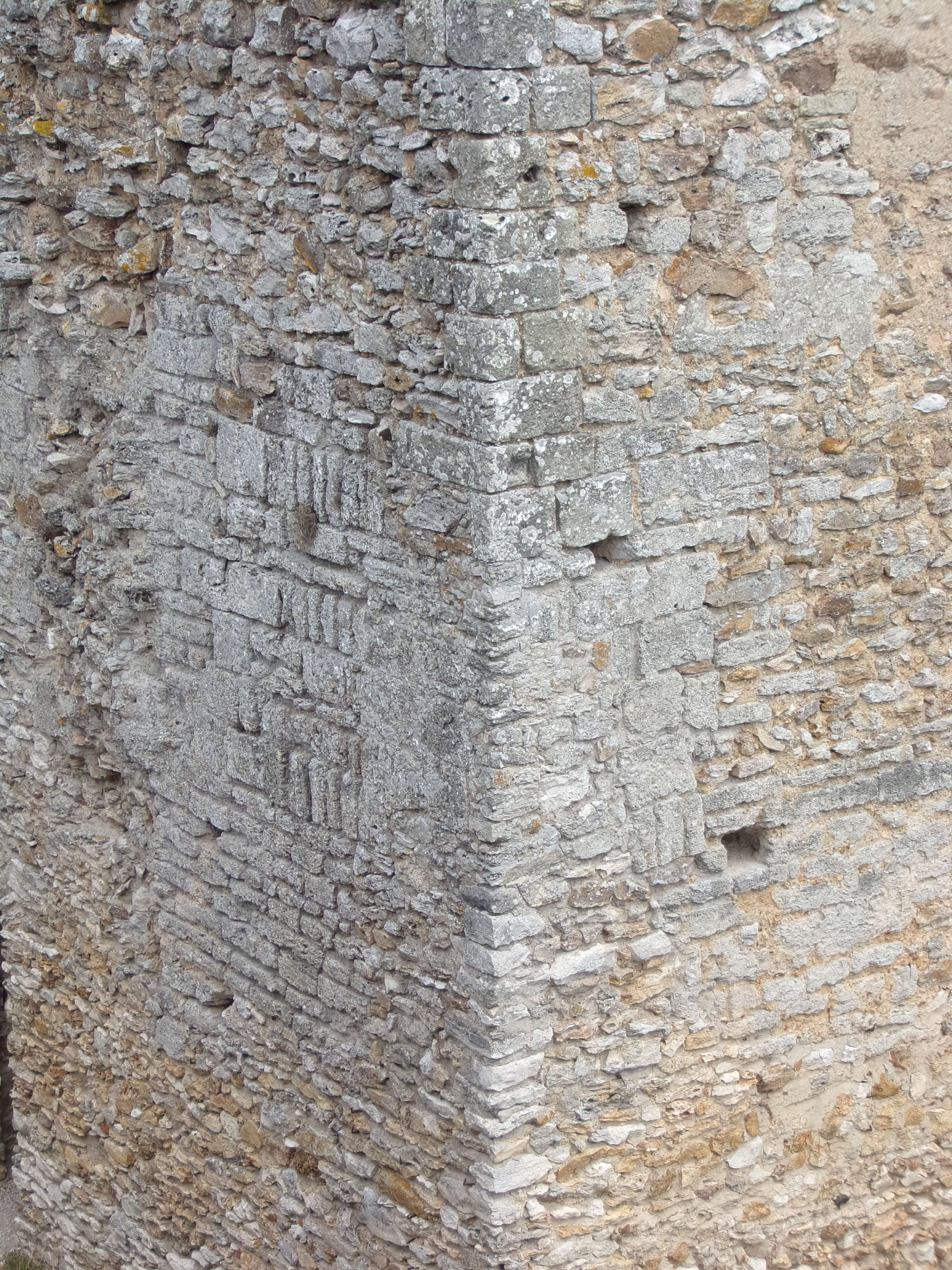
Travertine blocks in the facing of the main tower.

The construction of the entire castle complex (main tower, forebuilding, and outer wall) employs a diverse array of materials, some of which can be traced to their original sources. This construction is also characterized by a discernible effort to conserve these materials, as stones, in particular, are repurposed—some blocks are even incorporated into three successive buildings, the first of which remains unidentified—during successive phases of expansion or repair of the structures. (Note: Dalayeun 2003, pp. 70–71, La mise en œuvre : une économie de matériaux, vol. I)

The region is rich in lacustrine limestones, flints, and millstones, which are readily available at the surface, in underground galleries, or in small open quarries. Although these rocks are solid, they are not well suited for carving. Instead, they are the most commonly used in the construction of the buildings' walls with barely squared stones. The white chalk from Blois is only found in the outer wall in its initial state and is presumed to have originated from the dry moat, a defensive ditch dug close to the wall's base but not filled with water. The use of travertine in the initial state of the main tower is minimal, suggesting that it is not a locally sourced material. Its presence on other buildings close to the Indre Valley indicates that it was likely transported along the river from an unknown extraction point. It has been established that the blocks used in the fortress construction are derived from an unidentified edifice. Yellow tuffeau, which is coarser but exhibits a slightly reduced friability compared to white tuffeau, is extracted from numerous quarries in Touraine. This material is employed, cut into medium-sized blocks, in the walls’ construction. (Note: Dalayeun 2003, pp. 67–69, La mise en œuvre : une économie de matériaux, vol. I)

The wood from the surrounding forests can be used for the frameworks or floors, and the sand taken from the banks of the Indre, at the foot of the promontory, can be employed in the production of mortar. These materials are readily accessible. (Note: Dalayeun 2003, pp. 69–70, La mise en œuvre : une économie de matériaux, vol. I)

==== The keep or Donjon in the strict sense ====
===== General layout =====
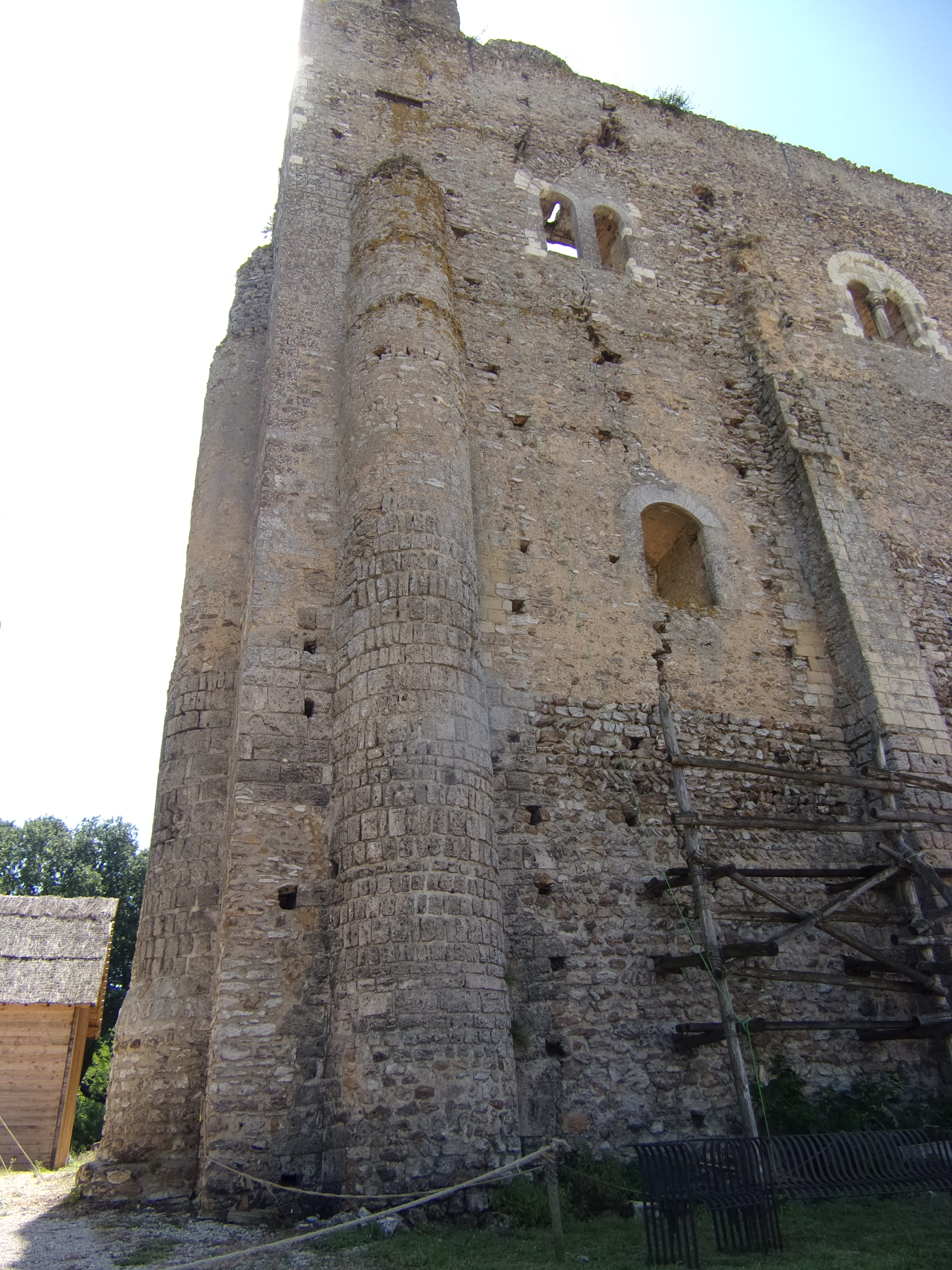
North face buttresses.

The keep has been preserved to a height of approximately 26 to 28 meters and has been identified as comprising three distinct levels. However, it is likely that the structure originally reached a height of at least 36 meters with the addition of an additional floor. The two lower levels, which constitute the oldest part of the structure, are constructed with flint and lacustrine limestone rubble, with some sections exhibiting a herringbone pattern. The corners of the walls, as well as the buttresses present on the northern and eastern faces (buttresses were also present on the west, though these were destroyed during the construction of the forebuilding and possibly on the south, which disappeared during a restoration of the facing), are composed of travertine blocks that have been reused without prior reshaping. The third and fourth levels, which are more recent, employ the same materials for masonry, albeit with a more irregular construction. However, the corner chains and buttress reinforcements are composed of tuffeau blocks. This structure has undergone significant alterations due to subsequent repairs and modifications. All the faces are pierced, both externally and internally, by putlog holes at varying levels and irregular spacings.

Restitution of the floors in the dungeon.

The buttresses are semicircular in plan on the eastern face and semicircular or rectangular on the northern face. Regardless of their shape, they are contemporary with the wall they support and were not added later. (Note: Dalayeun 2003, p. 81, Confort et sécurité, vol. I)

The internal dimensions of the main tower are 15 meters in length and 9 meters in width. The different floors of the keep are separated by floors supported by ledges on the north side and beams embedded on the opposite side. These floors may have been pierced with a trapdoor, which would have allowed communication between the levels by ladders or wooden stairs. However, no remains of stone stairs have been found. The door, located at ground level on the west side of the wall, provides access to the infilled ground floor. It appears to be a relatively modern addition, potentially dating to the 1820s. This would have allowed access to the top of the keep from the inside, which was subsequently used to support a telegraph. (Note: Dalayeun 2003, p. 55, La tour maîtresse, vol. I)

The configuration of the site meant that the southern side was the most vulnerable to attack, as the other sides were protected by natural defenses, including the Indre River and the cliff of the promontory. This is why the southern wall of the main tower is more substantial, with no internal ledges that would reduce its thickness, no windows, and its base reinforced by an artificial slope. In contrast, it does not appear to have buttresses.

===== Ground floor =====
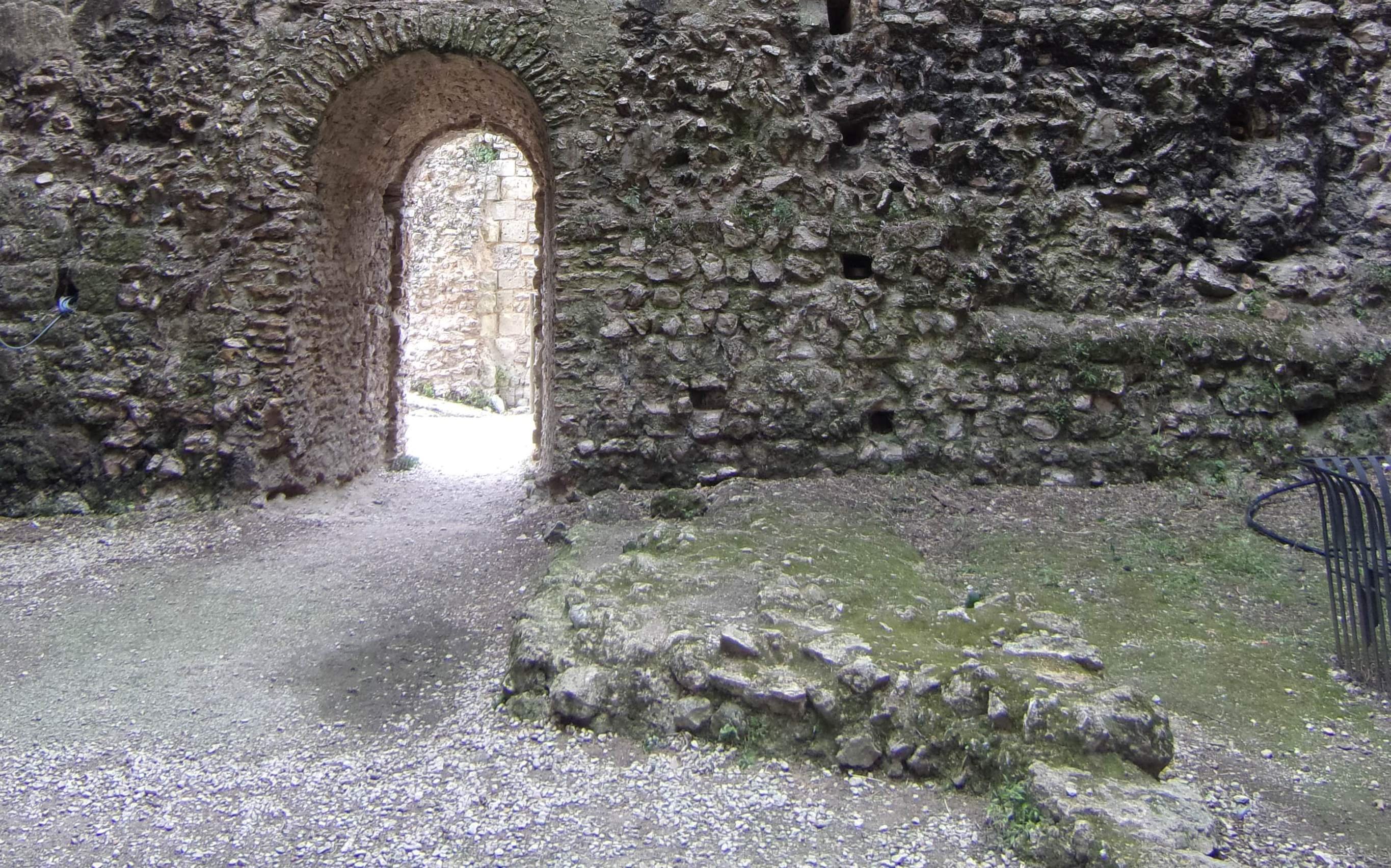
Remains of the first floor dividing wall.

The ground floor, which originally lacked windows—the openings in its eastern face appear to date to the late Middle Ages (Note: Dalayeun 2003, p. 55, La phase I – synthèse, restitution et datation du premier état médiéval, vol. I)—contains a wooden post partition that divides the level into two rooms lengthwise. It appears that around the 12th century, the partition was replaced by a load-bearing wall in which it was incorporated. From the same period until the 15th century, this level was gradually filled, first with construction waste from the southern outer wall and then with various fill materials, including domestic waste. As a result, the function of this level, which may have been initially intended for storage, is more challenging to ascertain.

In the 21st century, the thickness of the accumulated fill material within the ground floor area exceeds 6 meters, leaving only the upper part of the load-bearing wall visible. The ground level has not been reached by surveys and therefore cannot be studied.

===== First floor =====
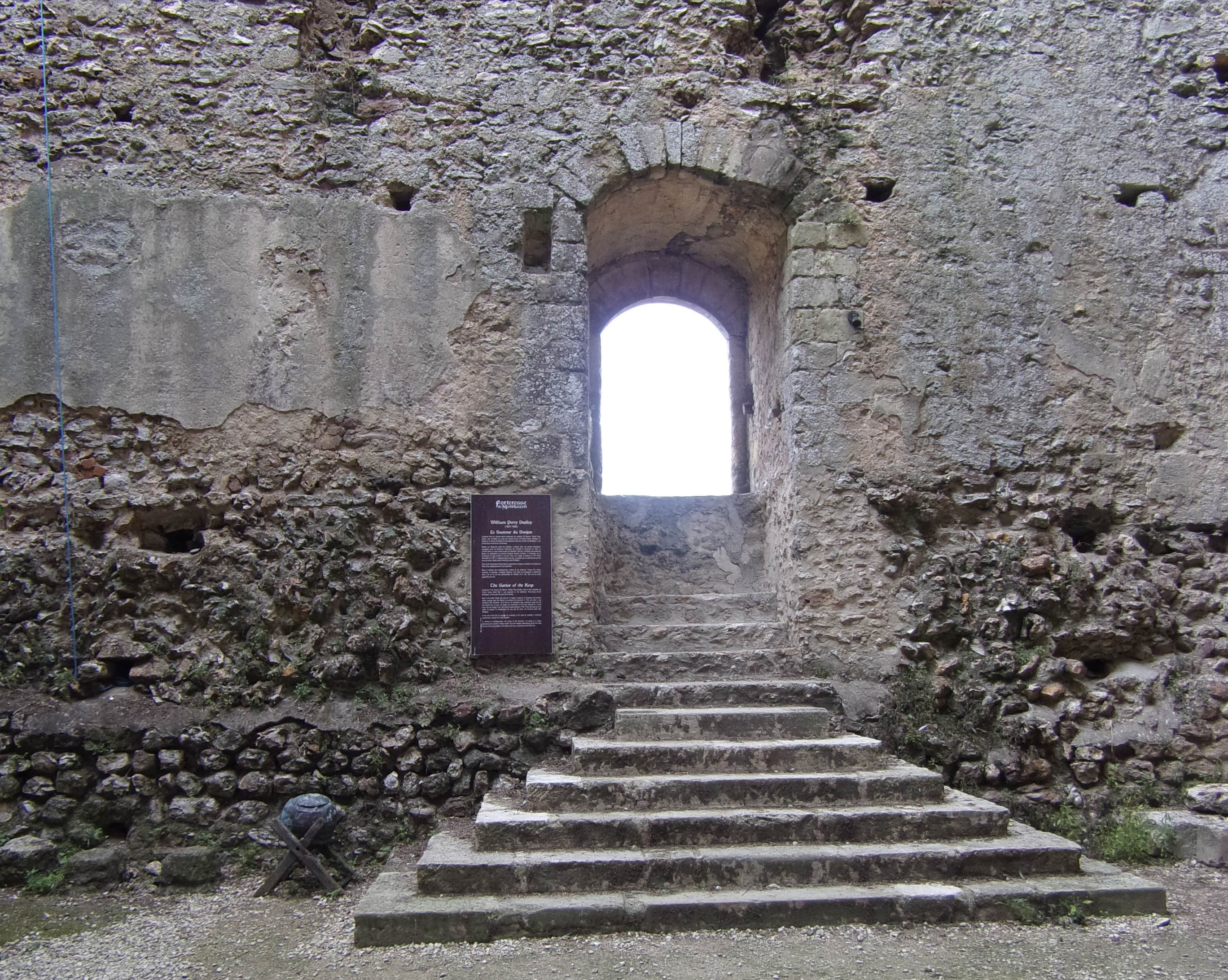
North facade.

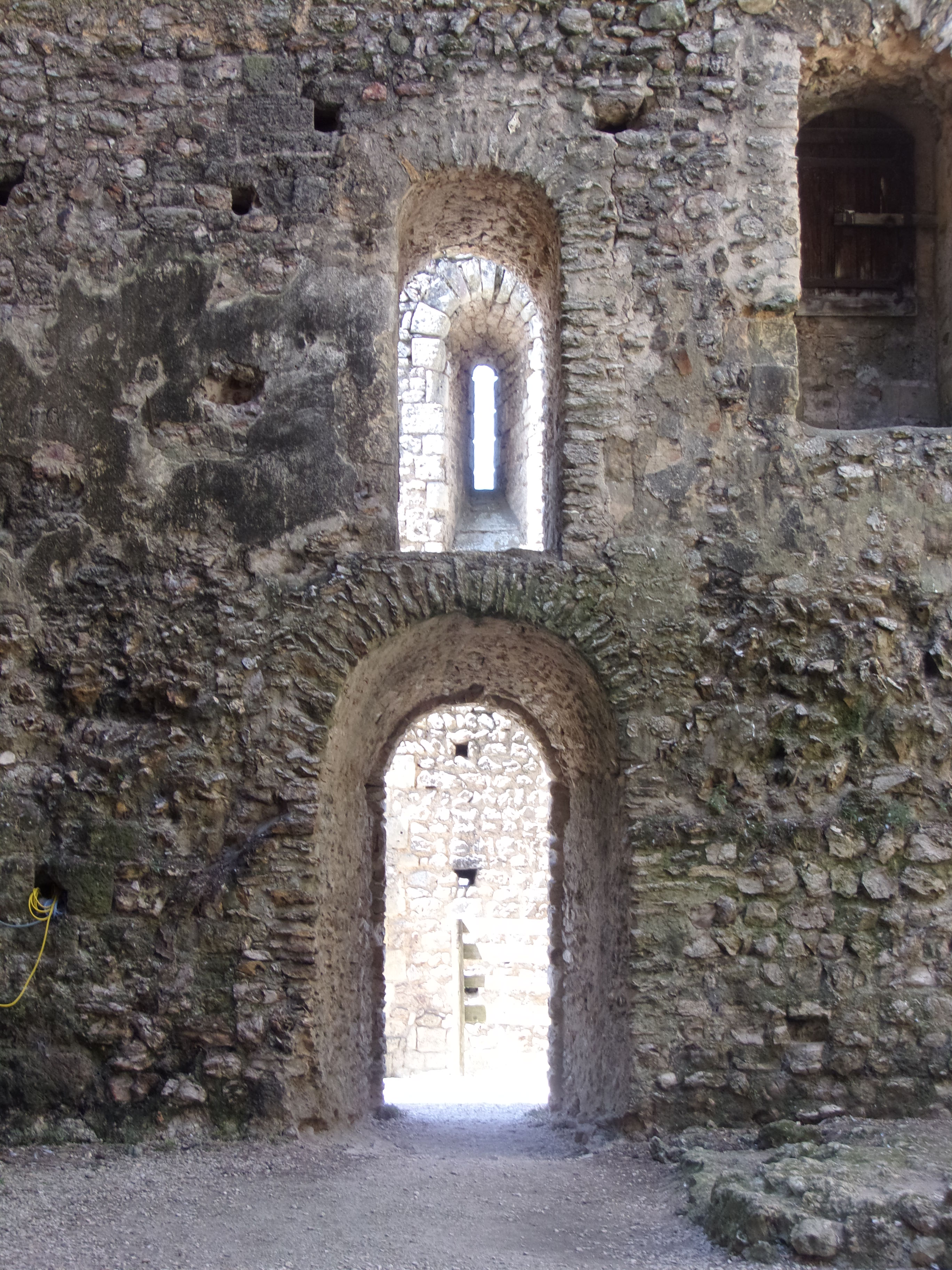
West facade.

Access doors to the keep.

This floor seems to have served as a circulation level, likely linked to the other floors of the main tower by ladders or wooden stairs, which have left no discernible traces. Its original floor is estimated to be approximately one meter above the current interior ground level. It is also plausible that this floor may have had domestic functions, such as storage.

For reasons of security, it was not possible to gain access to the keep from the ground floor. This was also the case in other locations, such as Loches. The north façade is pierced at approximately six meters above the current external ground level and just over a meter above the modern interior ground level by a door that provided access to the keep via an exterior ladder or wooden stairs before the construction of the forebuilding. Following this construction, access was always through this level but from the west, via a door connecting with the forebuilding. The door that opened below the previous one dates from the nineteenth century.

The wooden partition located on the ground floor also serves to divide this floor. Two windows, which were later sealed, provide illumination from the east.

===== Second floor =====
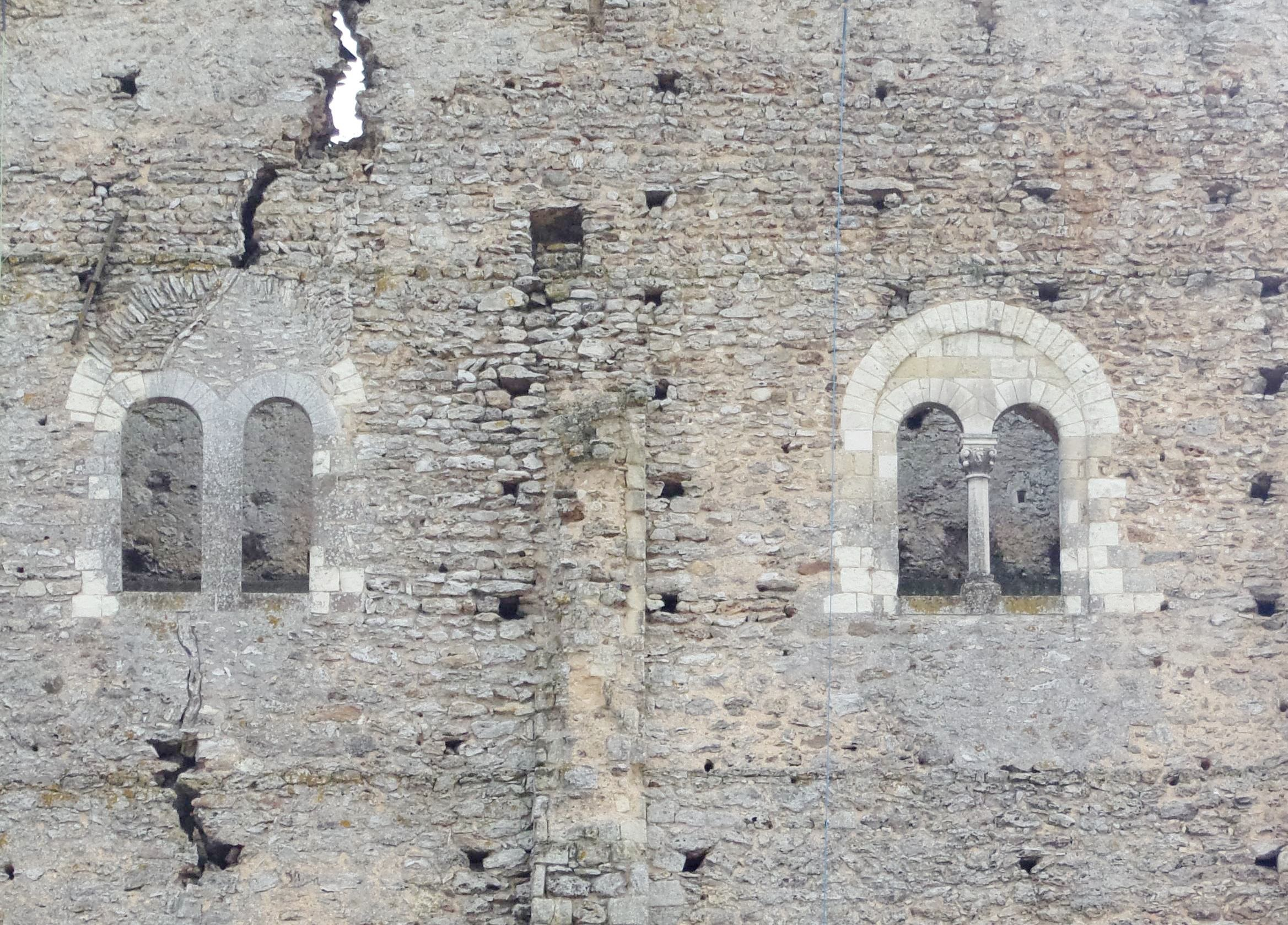
Bays on the north face.

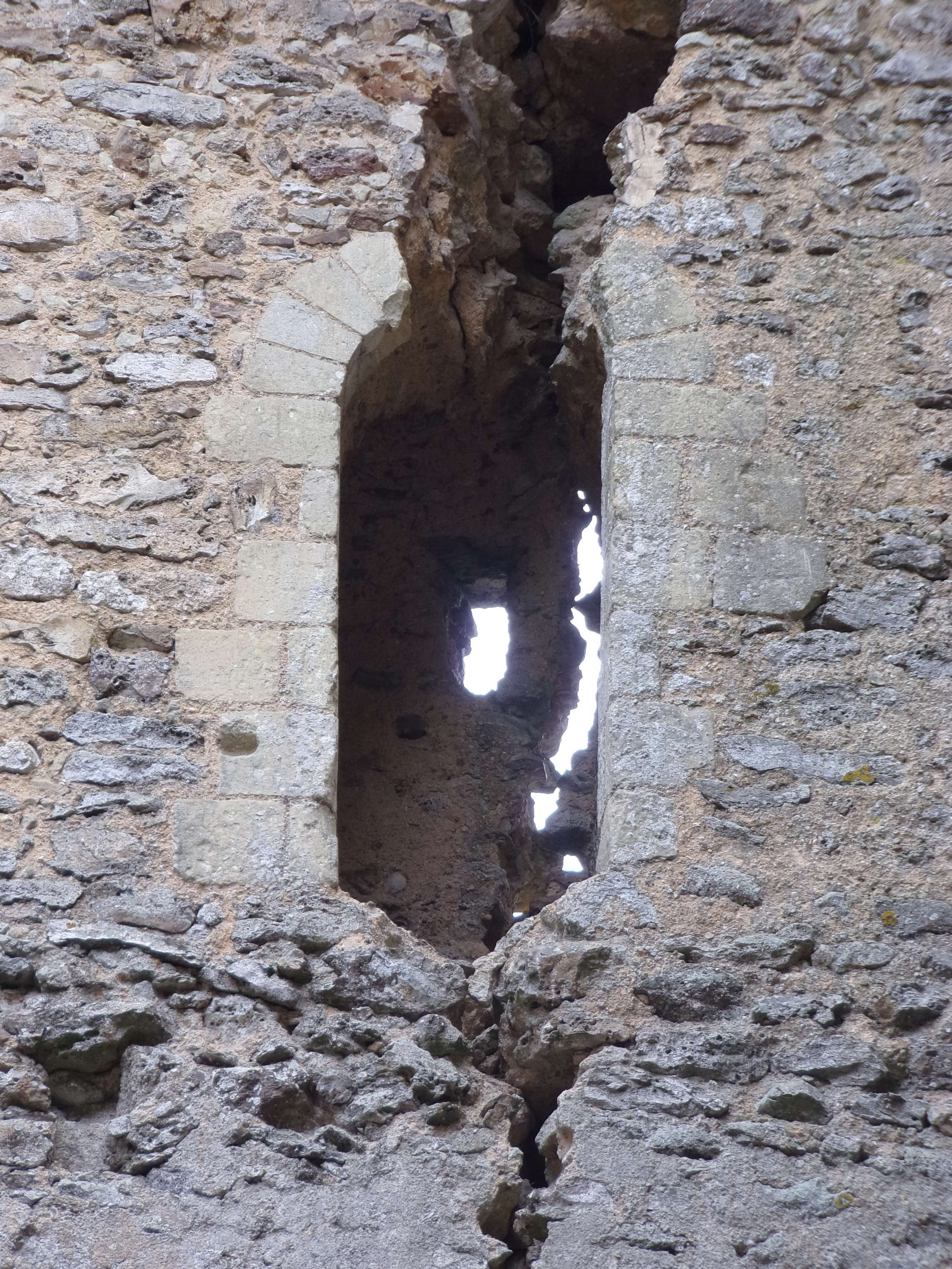
Latrines.

Layout of the second floor.

The second floor, which was likely the lord's residence and reception area during the Middle Ages, is equipped with comfort features. These include latrines built into the thickness of the eastern wall, their framing made of tuffeau, as is the case with all comparable features in the main tower at that time. Additionally, their drainage is external, running along the wall. (Note: Dalayeun 2003, p. 79, Confort et sécurité, vol. I) Two windows were also constructed at the same level, probably in the 12th century. They provide illumination for the room on the northern face. In the fifteenth century, the twin windows were rebuilt, and in the twentieth century, they were restored at the initiative of William Dudley. A window in the western wall is interpreted as a door that leads to the forebuilding roof. (Note: Dalayeun 2003, p. 75, Confort et sécurité, vol. I) However, no evidence of fireplaces has been found, suggesting that heating may have been provided by a hearth in the center of the room or, more likely, by braziers (Note: Maurice 1976, p. 30, Le donjon et ses seigneurs) that could be moved from room to room as needed. A long vertical groove in the eastern wall of the tower, north of the latrines, has not yet been identified as a chimney flue, and its function remains unknown. (Note: Dalayeun 2003, p. 30, La tour maîtresse, vol. I)

===== Third floor =====
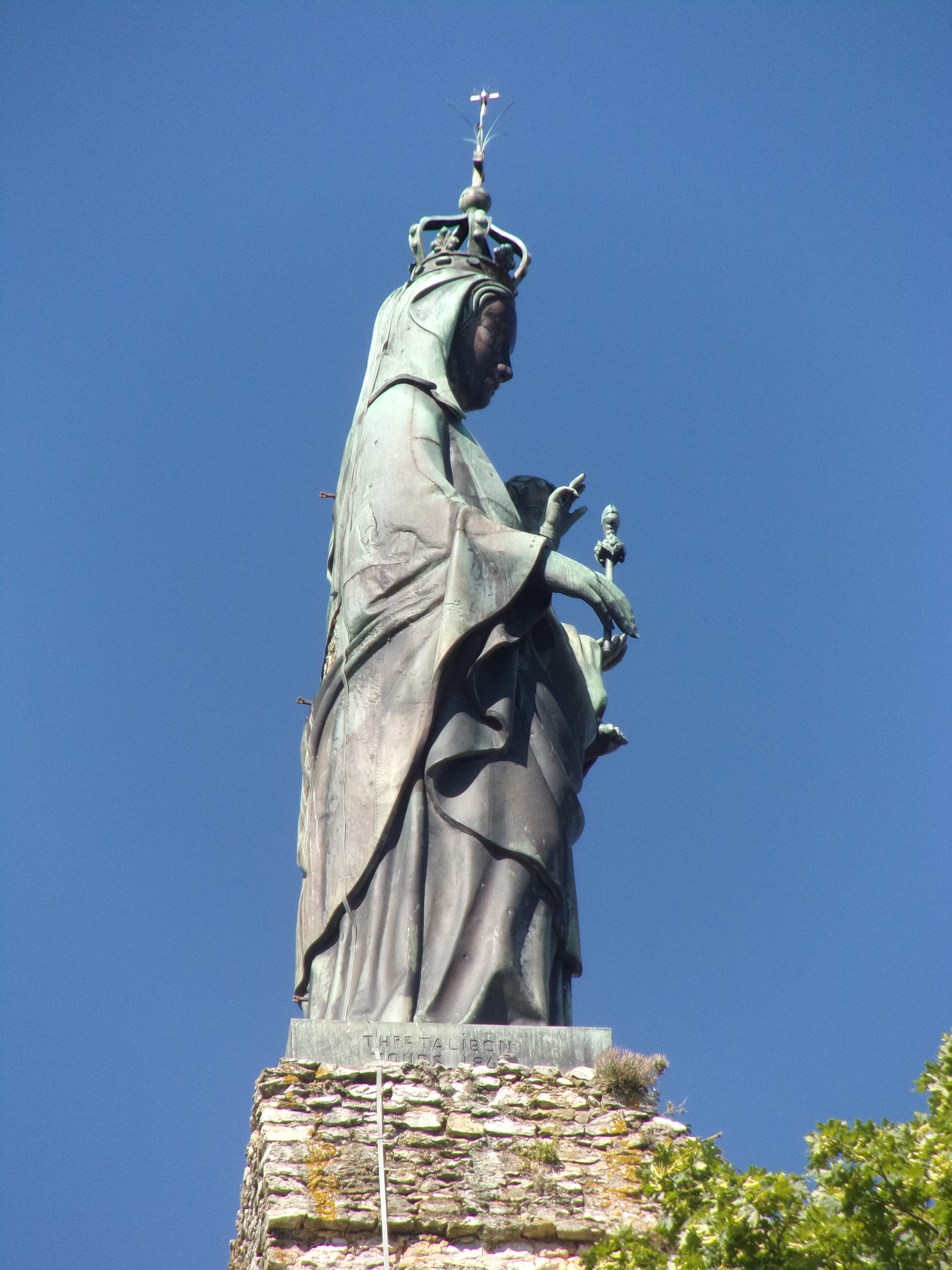
Statue of the Black Madonna.

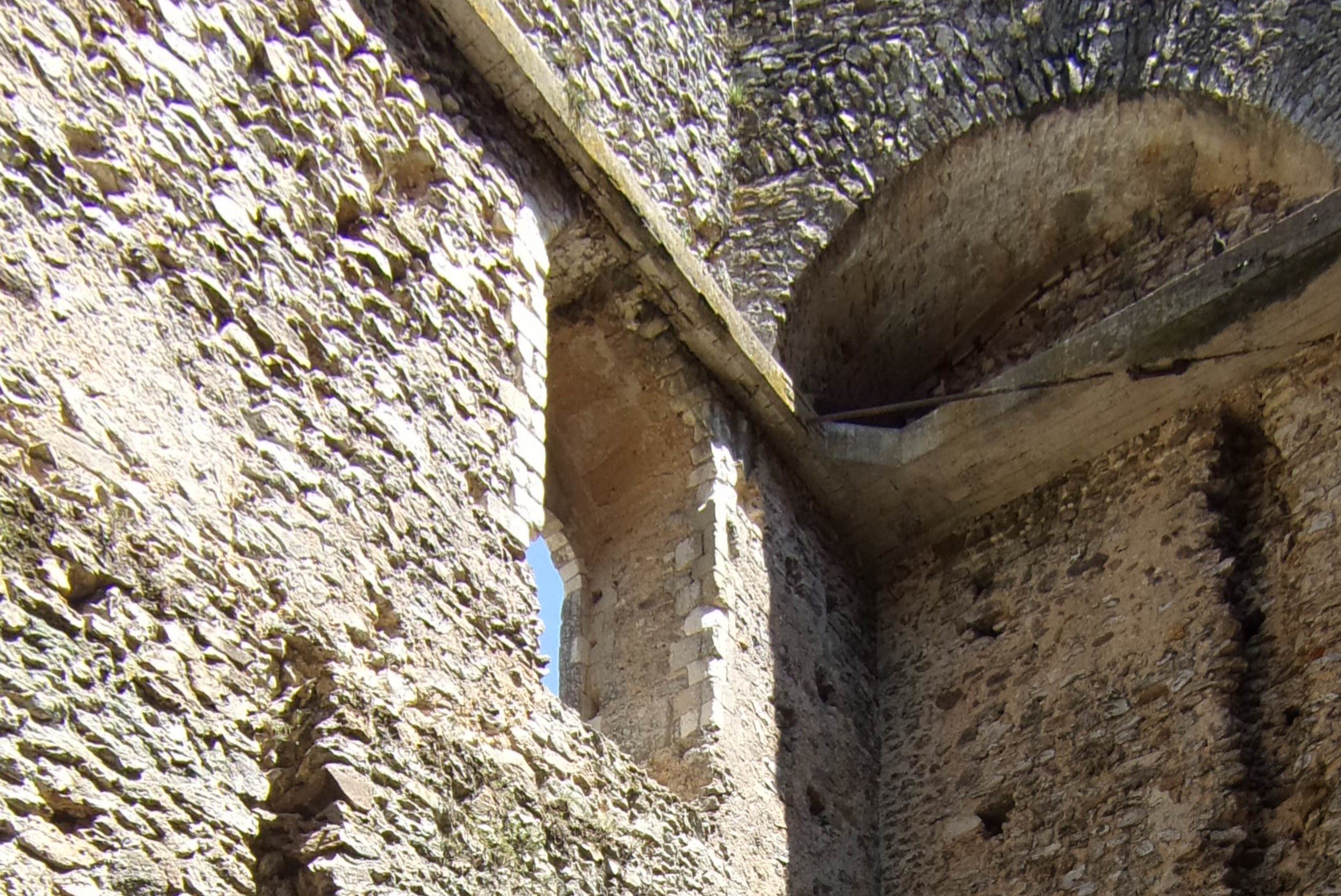
Concrete belt and vault to support the statue.

Summit facilities.

The state of preservation of the upper level of the keep, which has been subjected to extensive damage and modification on multiple occasions—the tower has lost at least the top eight meters of its original height—notably during the addition of various structures to its summit (telegraph, statue, and its supporting vault, reinforced concrete belt), precludes the drawing of conclusions regarding its architectural style and function. The only discernible remnants of the structure above the concrete belt are the holes where the beams supporting the floor were embedded. The presence of a row of arches at the summit remains unverifiable, and there is no evidence to suggest that the three identified windows at this level are original. Similarly, the presence of battlements and a four-sided roof, as seen in Loches, is plausible but not proven. (Note: Dalayeun 2003, pp. 59 & 60, La phase II – synthèse, restitution et datation du second état médiéval, vol. I)

It is postulated, on the basis of analogies with other edifices erected at the advent of the second millennium, that this floor may have constituted the domicile of the lord for his family or may have been allotted to the guards, two indispensable functions in a fortified manor house that have not been identified elsewhere in the main tower. (Note: Dalayeun 2003, p. 76, Analyse fonctionnelle des différents espaces, vol I)

==== Avant-corps ====
The internal dimensions of the structure are 7 meters by 4 meters. The structure originally reached the height of the first floor of the main tower and has two levels separated by a floor. Similarly, the structure's sole access point is via a door on its western façade, situated at the same elevation as the first floor of the main tower. This floor is directly connected to the structure. (Note: Dalayeun 2003, p. 39, L'avant-corps, vol. I) It seems probable that the ground floor of the avant-corps is accessible via an internal wooden or stone staircase. It is possible that the ground floor was used for storage purposes, and that a well was located in the southwest corner during the medieval period, as it is in the present day. (Note: Dalayeun 2003, p. 40, L'avant-corps, vol. I) The suggestion that a chapel was installed on the upper level, similar to that at Loches, is occasionally posited but lacks archaeological substantiation. It is equally plausible that this chapel represents a discrete structure within the site's enclosure, with no other definitive function. (Note: Dalayeun 2003, p. 77, Analyse fonctionnelle des différents espaces, vol I) Another door, situated on the second floor of the main tower, seems to link with the roof of the avant-corps.

The western wall of the structure remains, exhibiting reinforcement by three buttresses and two round-arched windows, in addition to a small portion of the northern return wall. The west face of the keep displays evidence of tearing, which corresponds to the anchoring of its missing walls. This allows for the reconstruction of its footprint. At the level of the remains of its northern wall, which is several meters high, the jamb of a window, possibly a door, remains in place. Its masonry also includes travertine blocks, which may have been salvaged during the partial reconstruction of the keep from structures of the main tower, where these stones had already been reused.

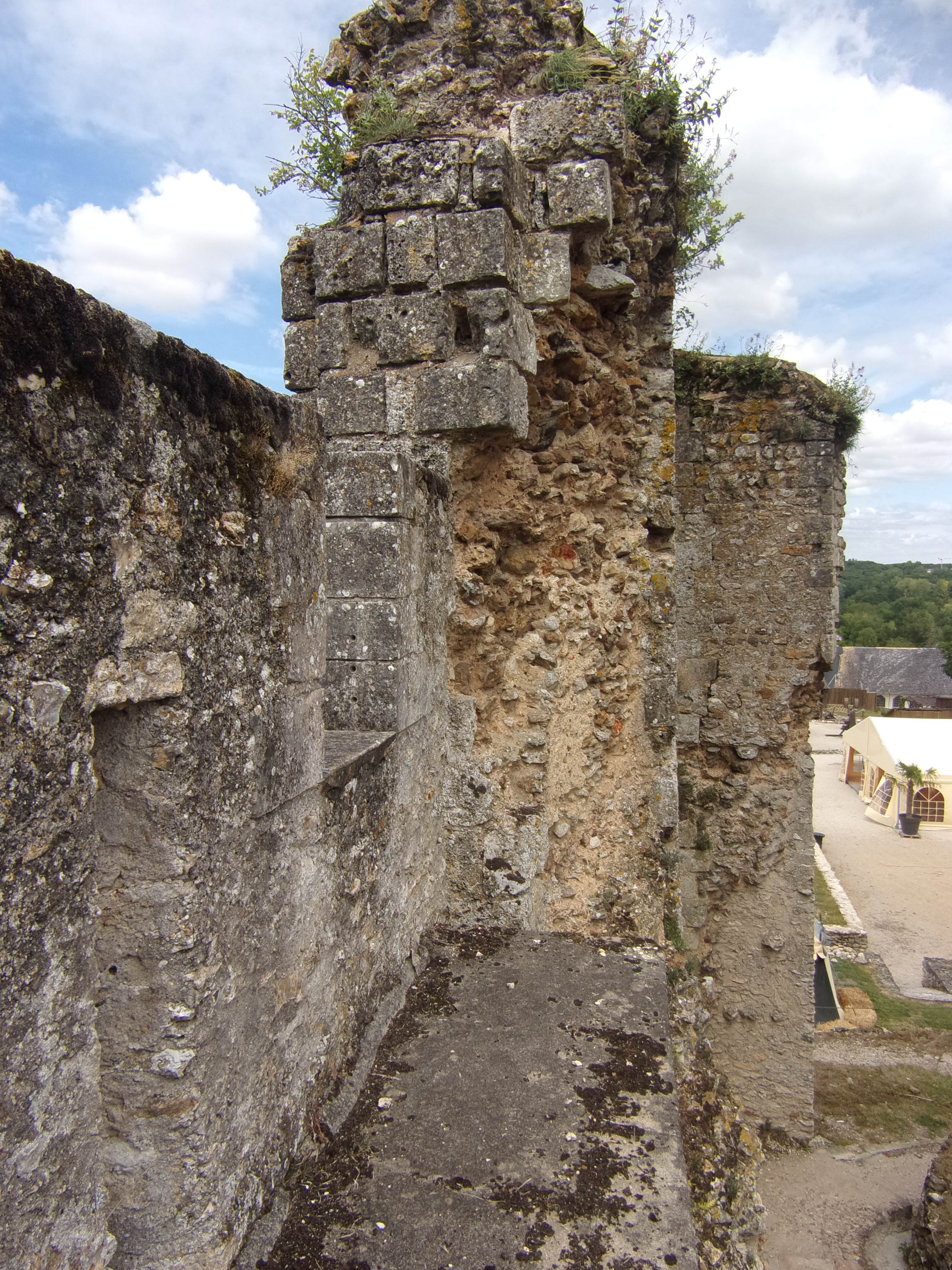
View from the south.

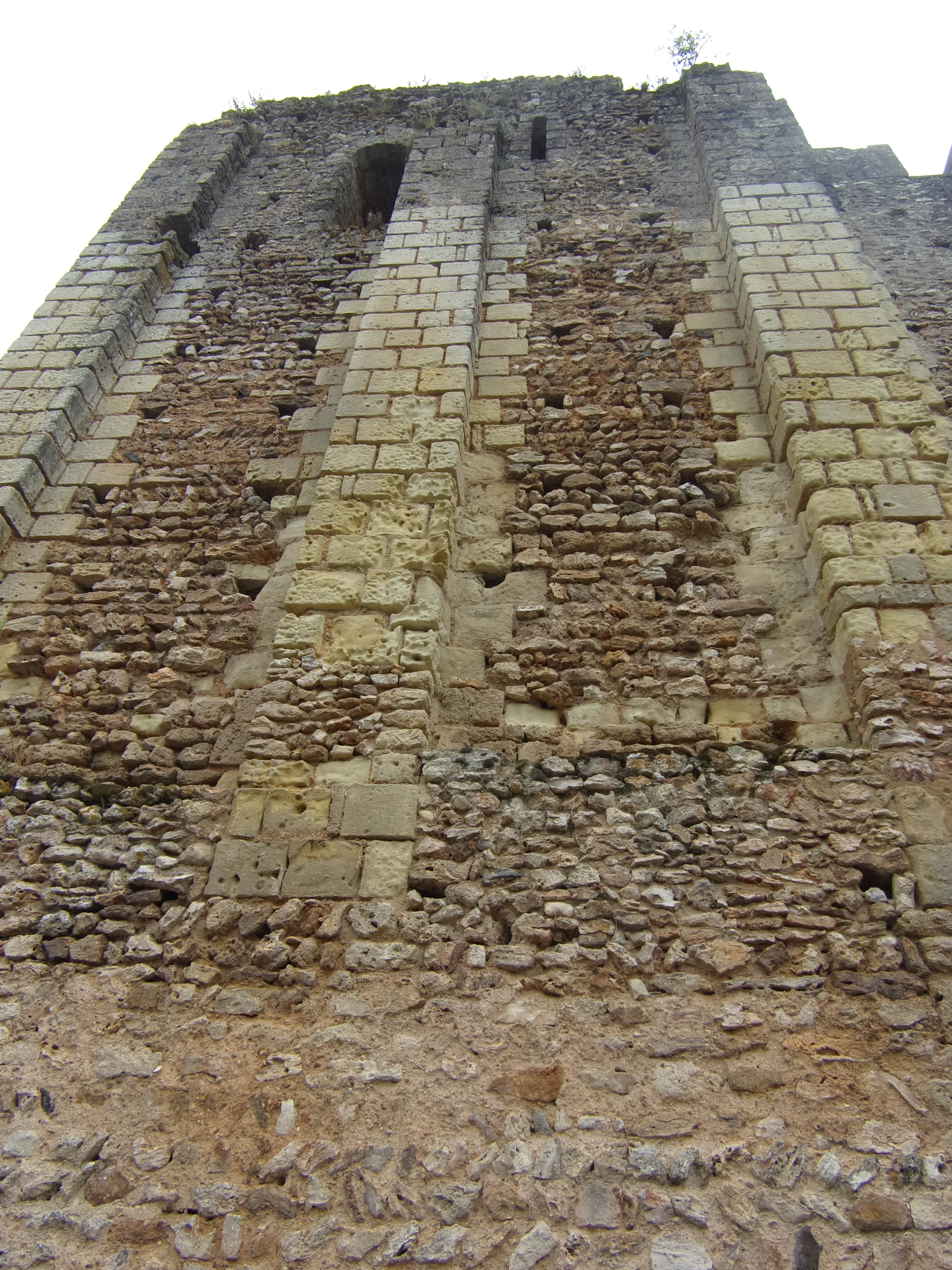
Forebody buttresses.

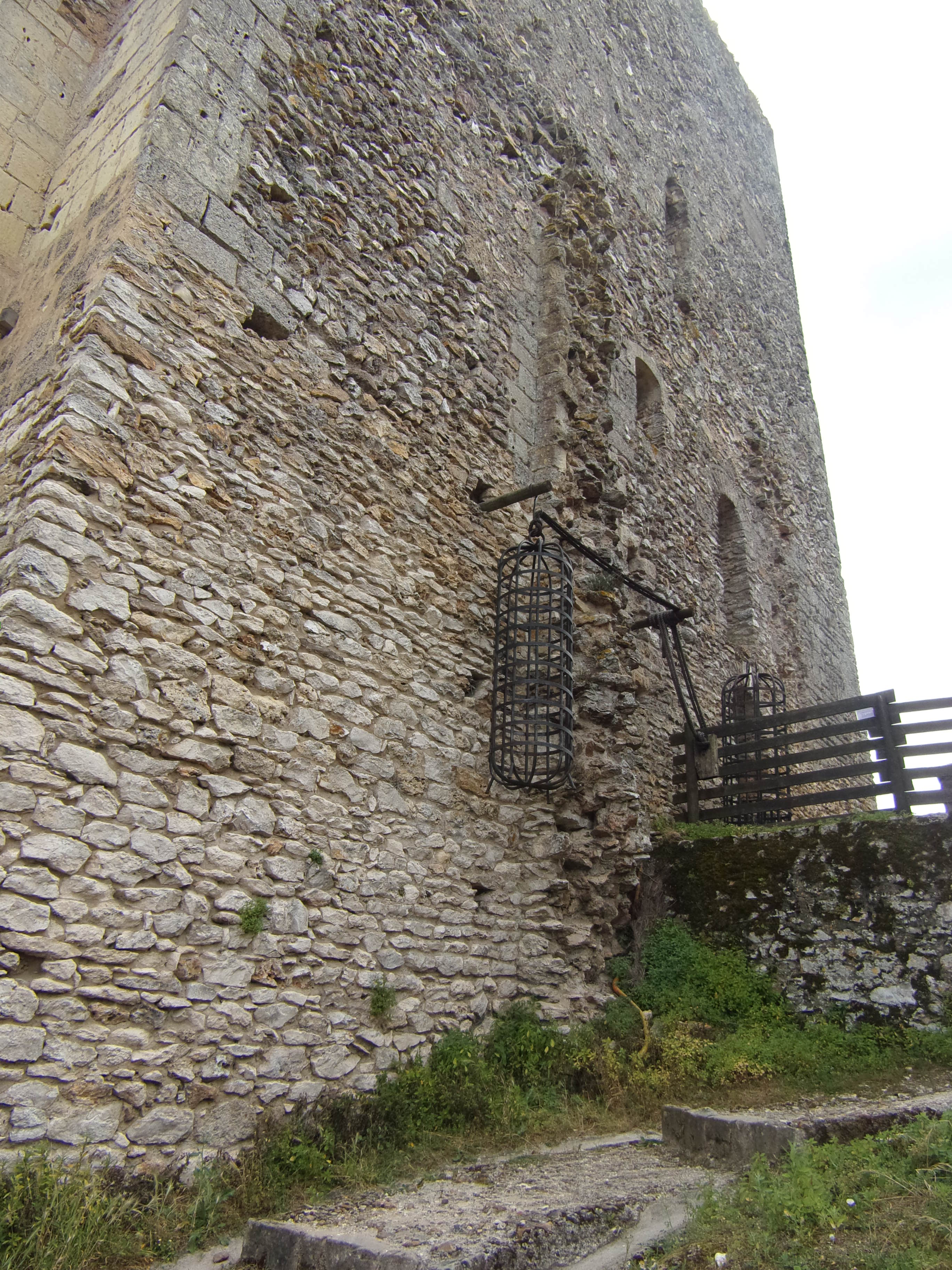
Outbuildings on the main tower.

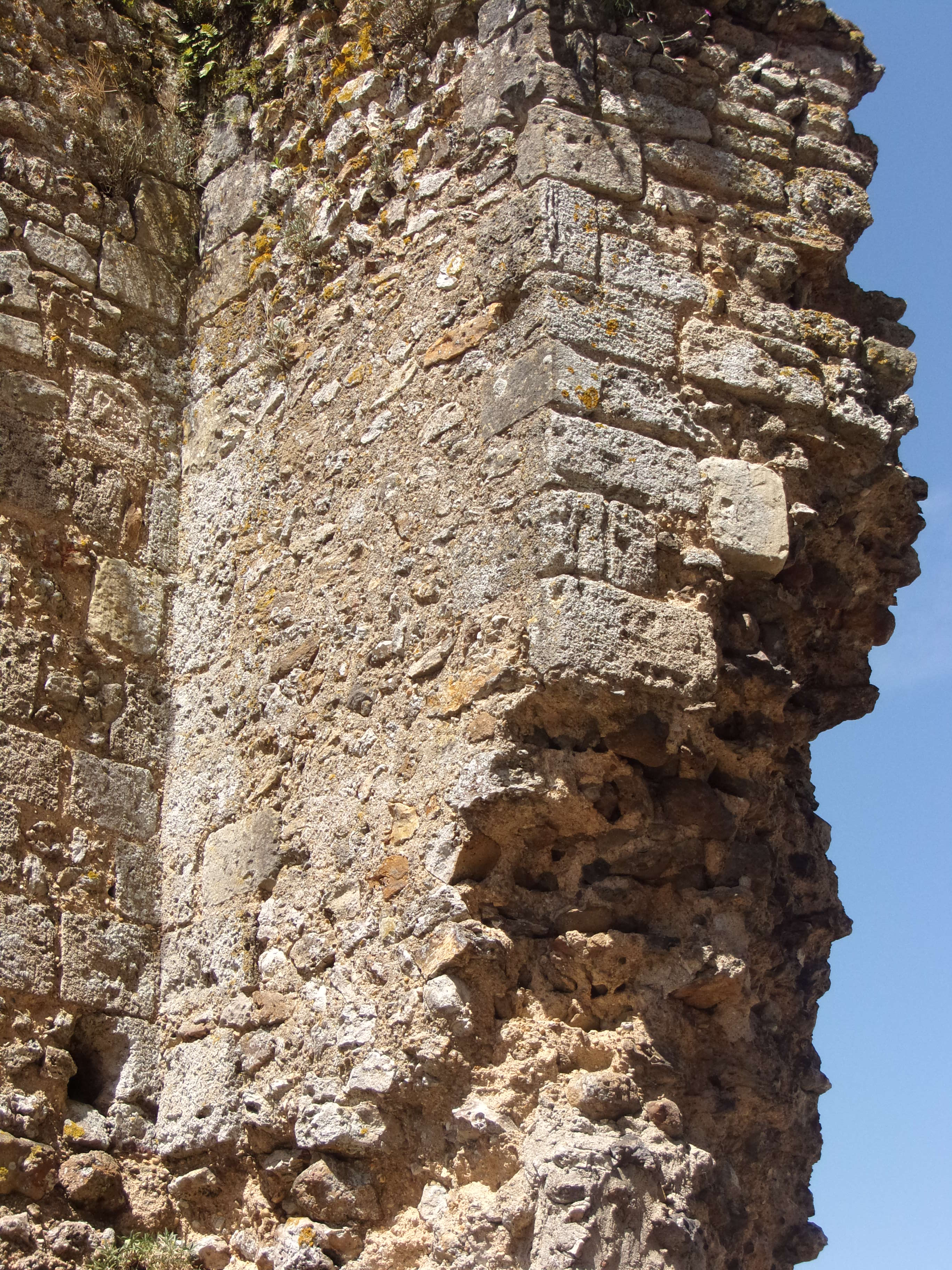
Right foot of a bay.

==== Chemise and towers ====
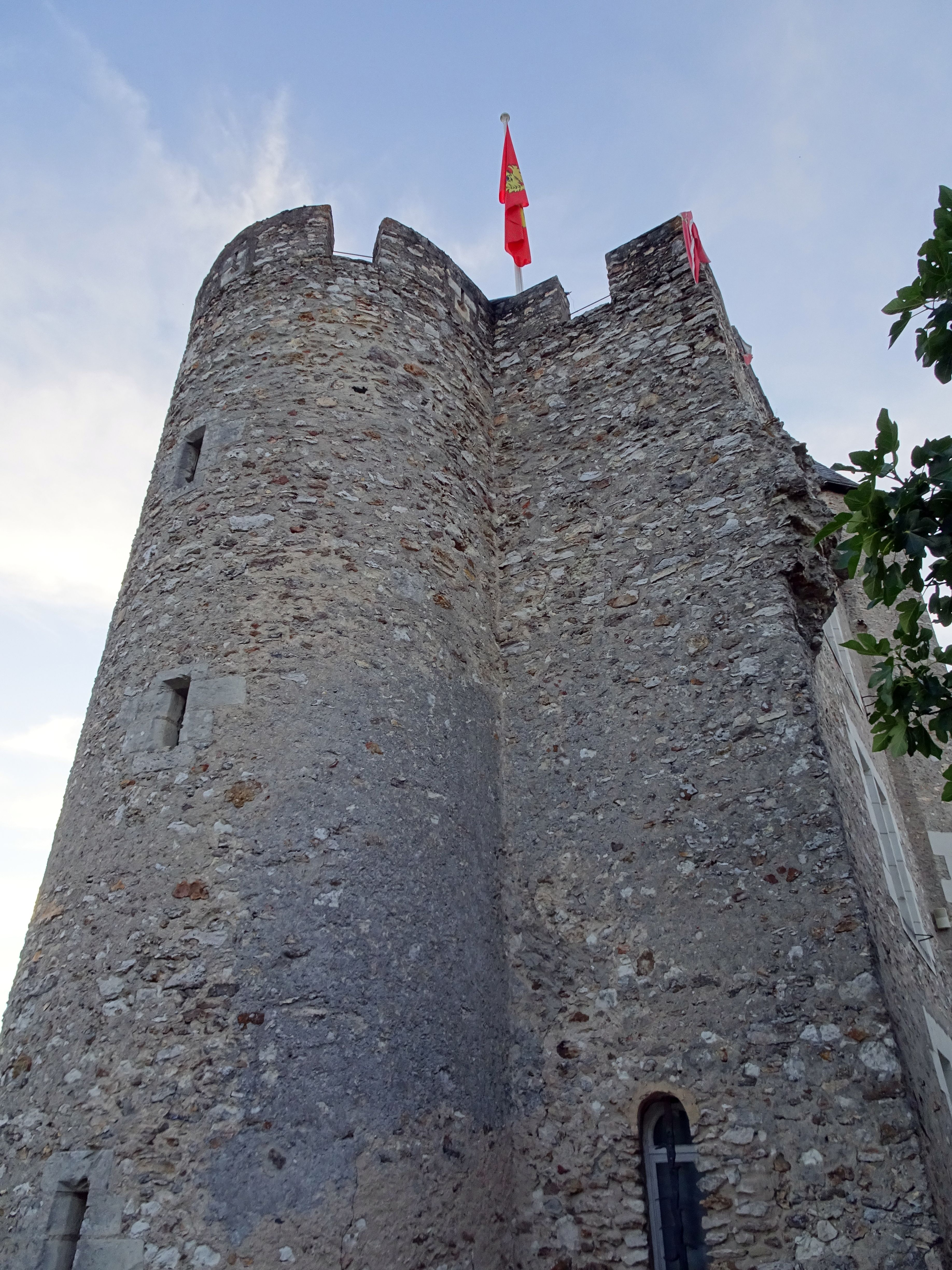
Philippine tower.

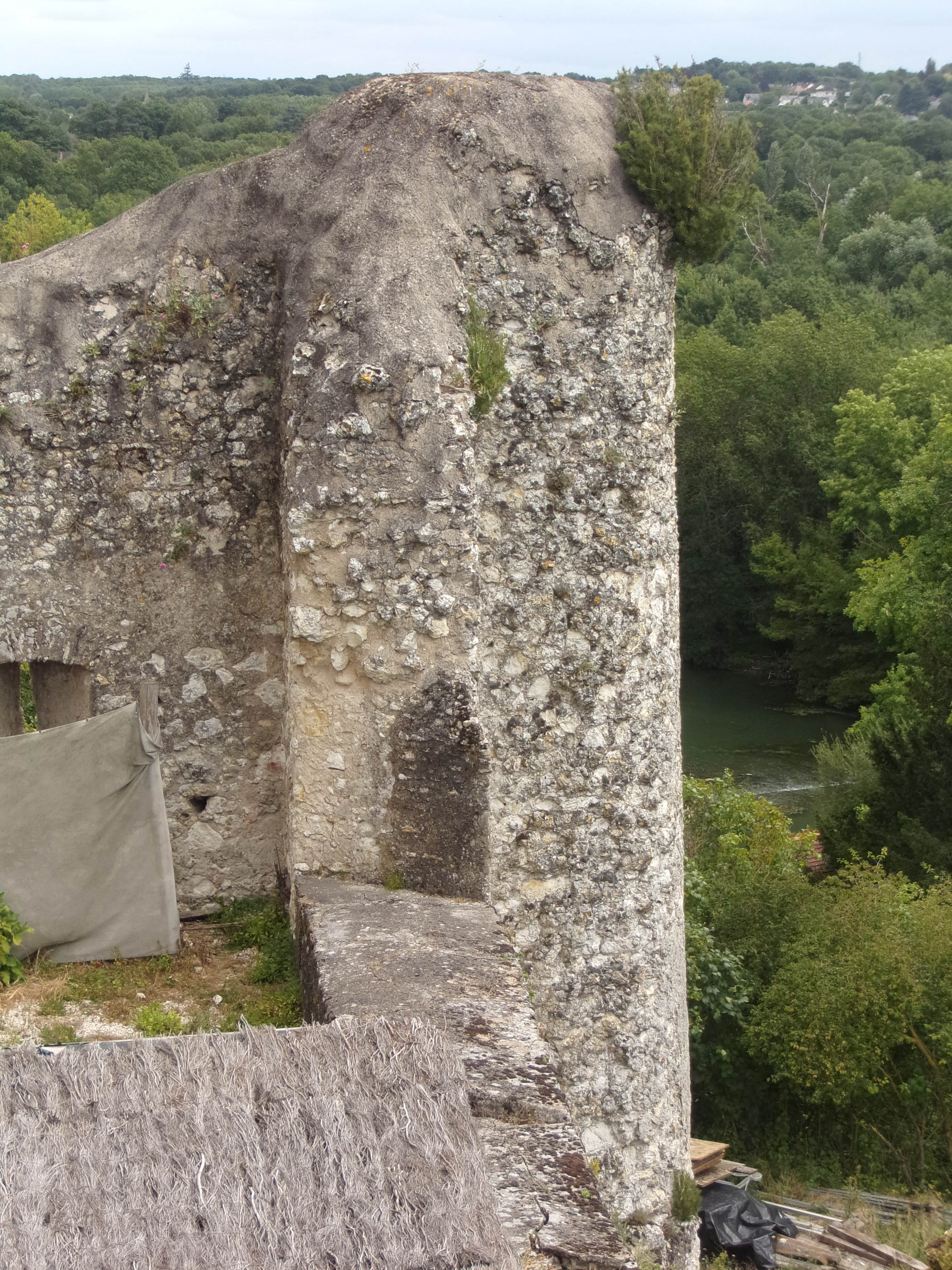
South-east corner tower.

The chemise protects the south of the main tower and its avant-corps, thus delineating a high court with a ground level matching the motte against the main tower. This layout could have been designed as gardens for the lord's benefit. To the east, the structure is situated against the wall of the keep, and to the west, it is positioned against that of the avant-corps. The reconstruction employed the same stones that constituted the initial structure, thereby conserving materials. The southern wall was largely leveled in the 20th century; however, it still exhibits traces of arrow slits that formerly pierced it. (Note: Dalayeun 2003, p. 70, Annexes, vol. I)

The southeastern corner of the chemise is reinforced by a solid tower, which appears to be designed primarily for structural stability rather than for defense. The tower at the southwest corner, known as the "Philippian Tower," was constructed at a later date than the previous one. It features its protective avant-corps, latrines indicating continuous occupation (possibly by guards), three levels separated by floors, and arrowslits at each level. These characteristics indicate that it was designed for defensive purposes. However, its crenellation, like that of the western wall of the chemise, dates from the 20th century.

=== Other buildings and structures of the castle site ===
==== William's lodge and Lilian's tower ====
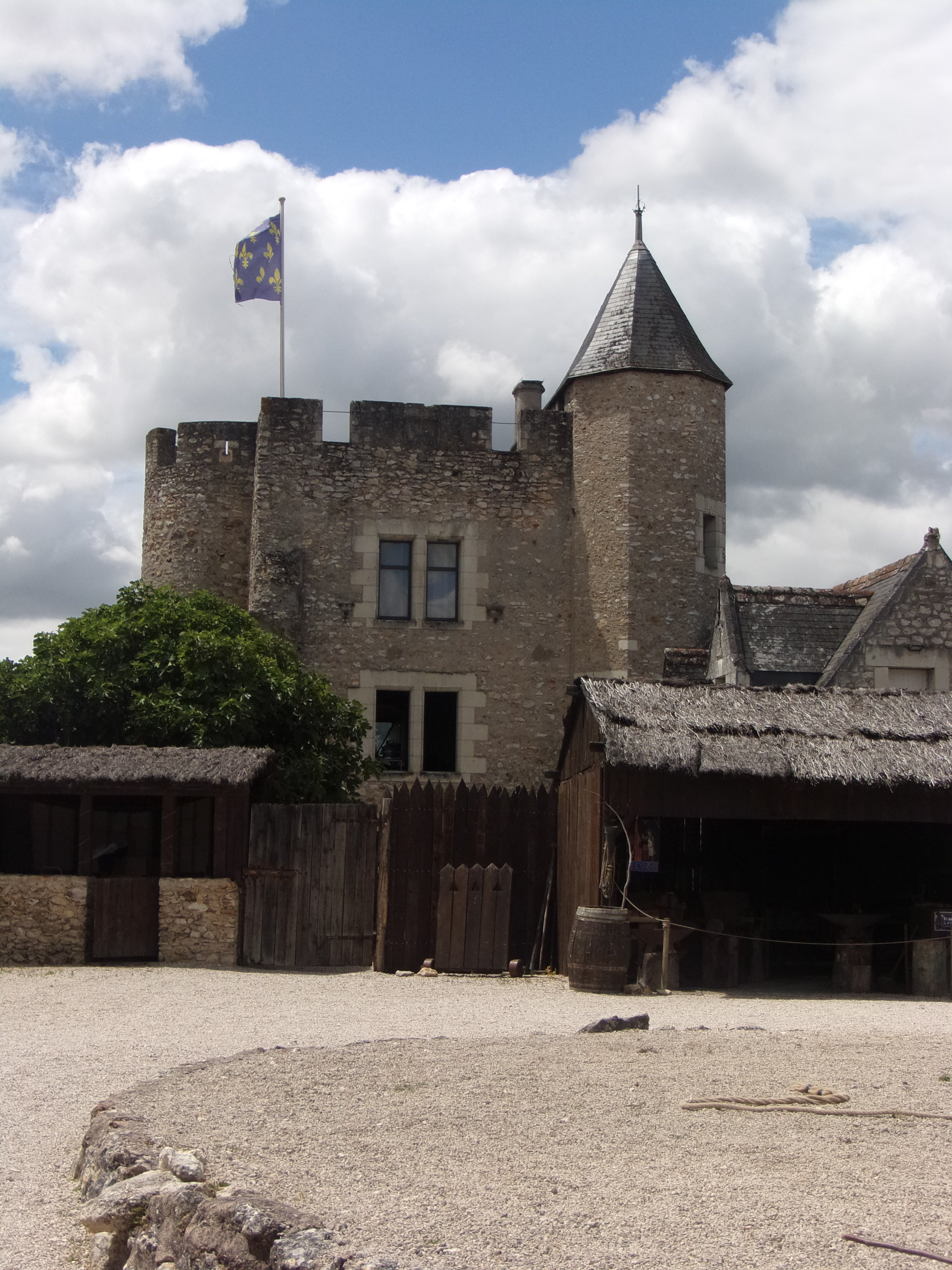
Logis William and Lilian Tower in the background.

Upon their arrival in Montbazon, William Dudley and Lilian Whitteker took up residence in a tower situated against the enclosure, which may be the last remaining structure from the 15th-century castle. However, this tower was in a state of severe disrepair. Access to the sole habitable room was via an external ladder, and the newcomers were compelled to engage in culinary activities within a wooden shed situated within the courtyard. Consequently, efforts were promptly initiated to enhance the living conditions within the tower.

The tower, designated "Lilian's Tower," underwent a comprehensive reconstruction in a medieval style, encompassing the addition of battlements to the adjacent enclosure, which was preserved. A Touraine architect constructed a modest neo-Gothic manor, designated "William's Lodge," against the enclosure. This structure featured a gazebo that overlooked the town. The architectural plans were inspired by the manor of La Fresnaye in Monts. The ground floor of the manor was designed as a kitchen, while the bedrooms, illuminated by dormer windows, were located upstairs in the attic. (Note: Vieira 1997, pp. 9 & 9 bis) In the 21st century, simple glass windows were installed in place of the stained glass windows that had been installed by Dudley but stolen in the 1980s.

==== Castle chapel ====
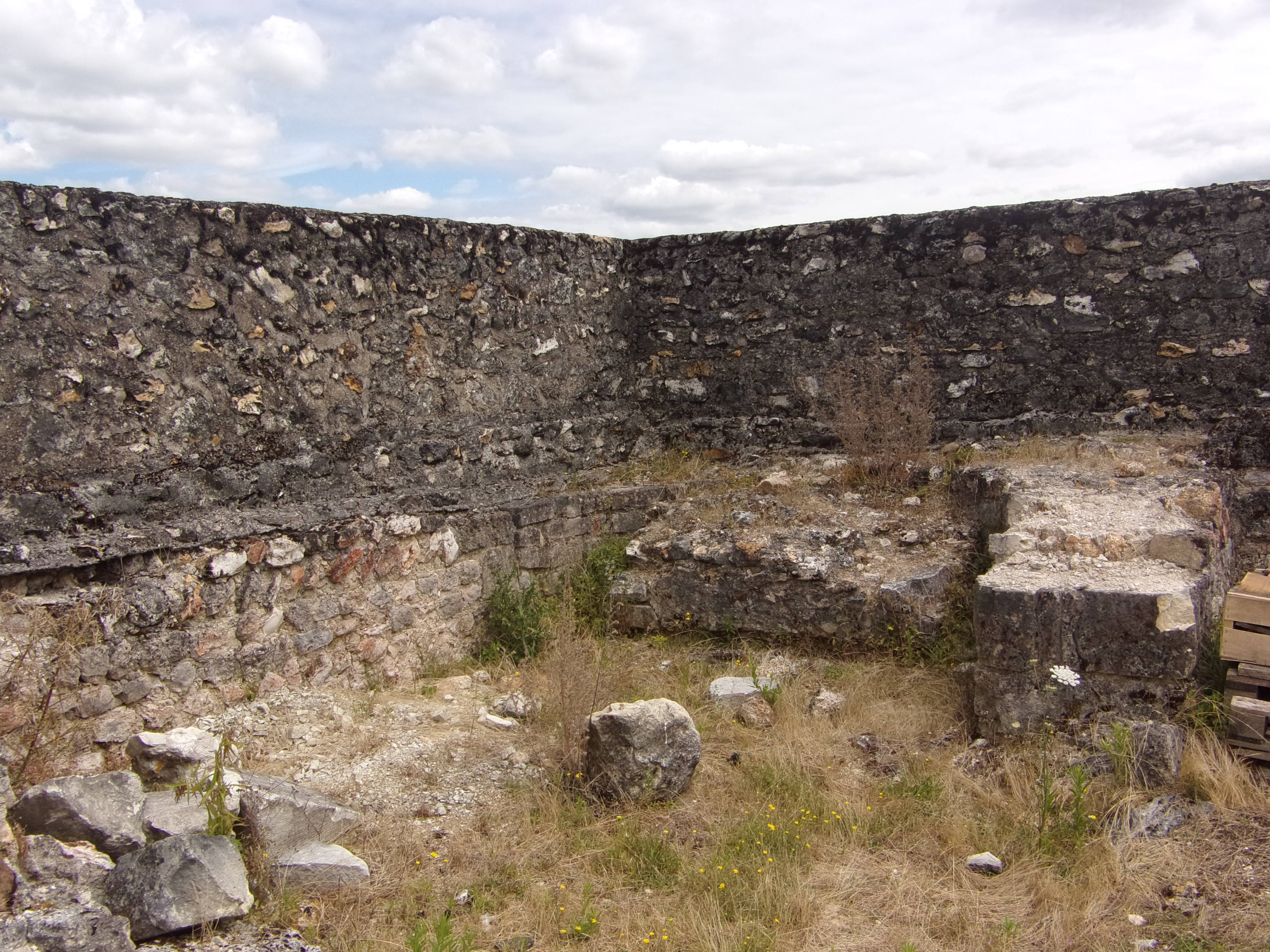
Remains of the castle chapel.

This modest religious structure, dedicated to Saint George, dates back to the medieval period (12th century) and partially incorporates an older architectural foundation. The structure comprises a simple nave, devoid of side aisles, with a length of at least 23.5 meters. The portal, situated to the west, has not been identified. The building features a flat chevet, flanked by two chapels that conclude in semicircular apses. The southern chapel, measuring 9.5 meters in width, may have been designated for the lord and was used on multiple occasions as a funeral chapel.

It appears that the castle chapel, constructed around the 14th century or slightly earlier, underwent a temporary change in function, serving as a metallurgy workshop instead of a religious facility. Only the initial courses of its walls, unearthed during excavations in the early 2010s, remain intact. However, its architectural plan, as evidenced by historical records, places it close to the former collegiate church of Notre Dame de Loches. Nevertheless, it underwent a series of modifications over time, which have made it challenging to interpret accurately the remains.

==== Underground tunnels ====
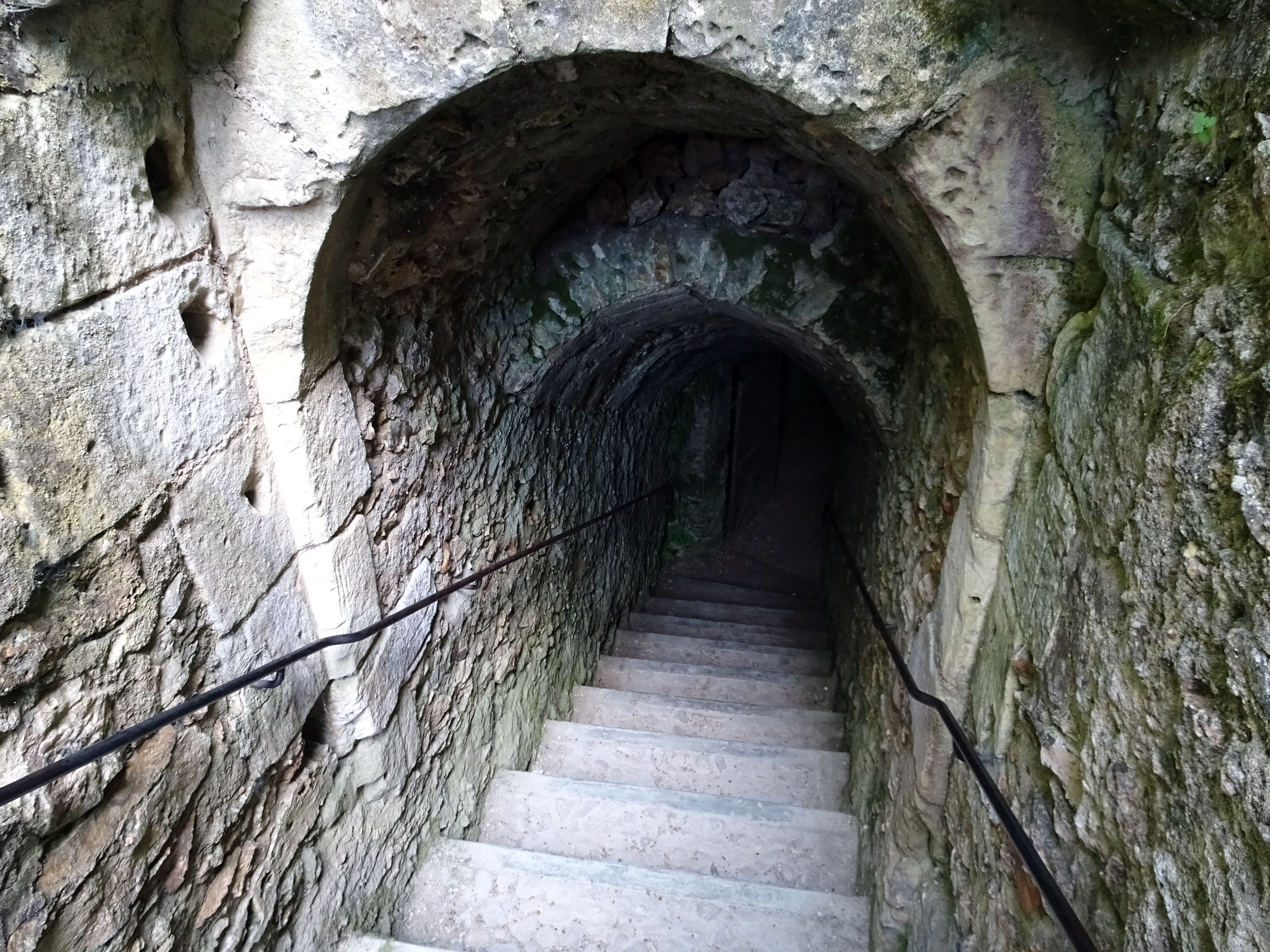
Entrance.

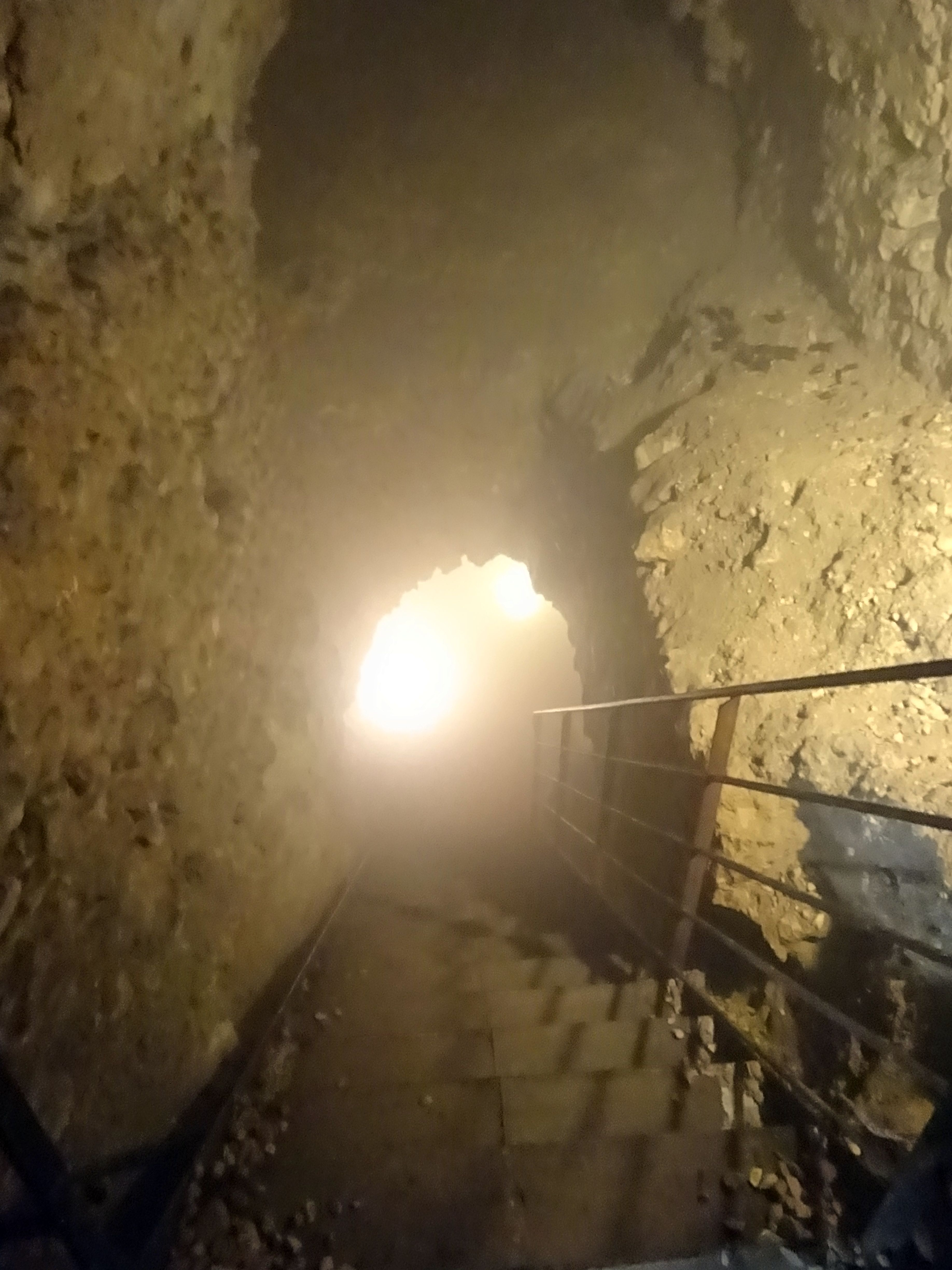
Partial view of a gallery.

The subterranean passages of the fortress, unearthed and partially investigated in 1857, originally encompassed a length of 14 km across three levels, extending beneath the town. Identified at a depth of a minimum of 14 meters, they are primarily composed of quarries used for extracting building materials for the fortress, the majority of which were subsequently vaulted. They are predominantly in a state of disrepair, either due to natural collapse or deliberate filling.

It is believed that one of the branches of the tunnel led to the center of the village, allowing the fortress to be evacuated in the event of an imminent threat. Excavations conducted in the church in 1851 revealed the existence of this tunnel. These excavations also disproved the tradition that the tunnel passed under the bed of the Indre River to emerge on its right bank. (Note: Maurice 1976, p. 144, Au temps des diligences) No feature in the surviving sections suggests that the tunnel served as a refuge; however, this function is suggested. It is more likely that the tunnel served as cellars for storing provisions, a use not considered by Charles de Sourdeval when he reported on their exploration in 1857.

==== Enclosures ====
The two enclosures, which date from the 13th and 15th centuries, have not withstood the test of time. They were largely demolished when the defensive aspect of the castle became secondary and materials were needed for urbanization projects, notably the Spain Road. The walls surrounding the site are mostly modern, often dating from the reconstructions by William Dudley. However, they seem to follow the outline of the old fortifications.

Nevertheless, vestiges of the southern enclosure dating to the 13th century remain, situated adjacent to the avant-corps and the northwest corner of the main tower, as well as to the west of the access ramp. The 15th-century enclosure, constructed on the promontory's ridge on a subsoil characterized by numerous cavities, is susceptible to landslide hazards. In 2011, the northern point was destroyed by a landslide, which also took with it the northern tower of the enclosure, which is thought to date from the 13th century. On 14 December 2019, a further landslide occurred, this time affecting a section of the hillside northeast of the castle site and the enclosure, which collapsed into a lane between two houses. There is a further risk of further landslides in the area, as the ground has not yet been stabilized.

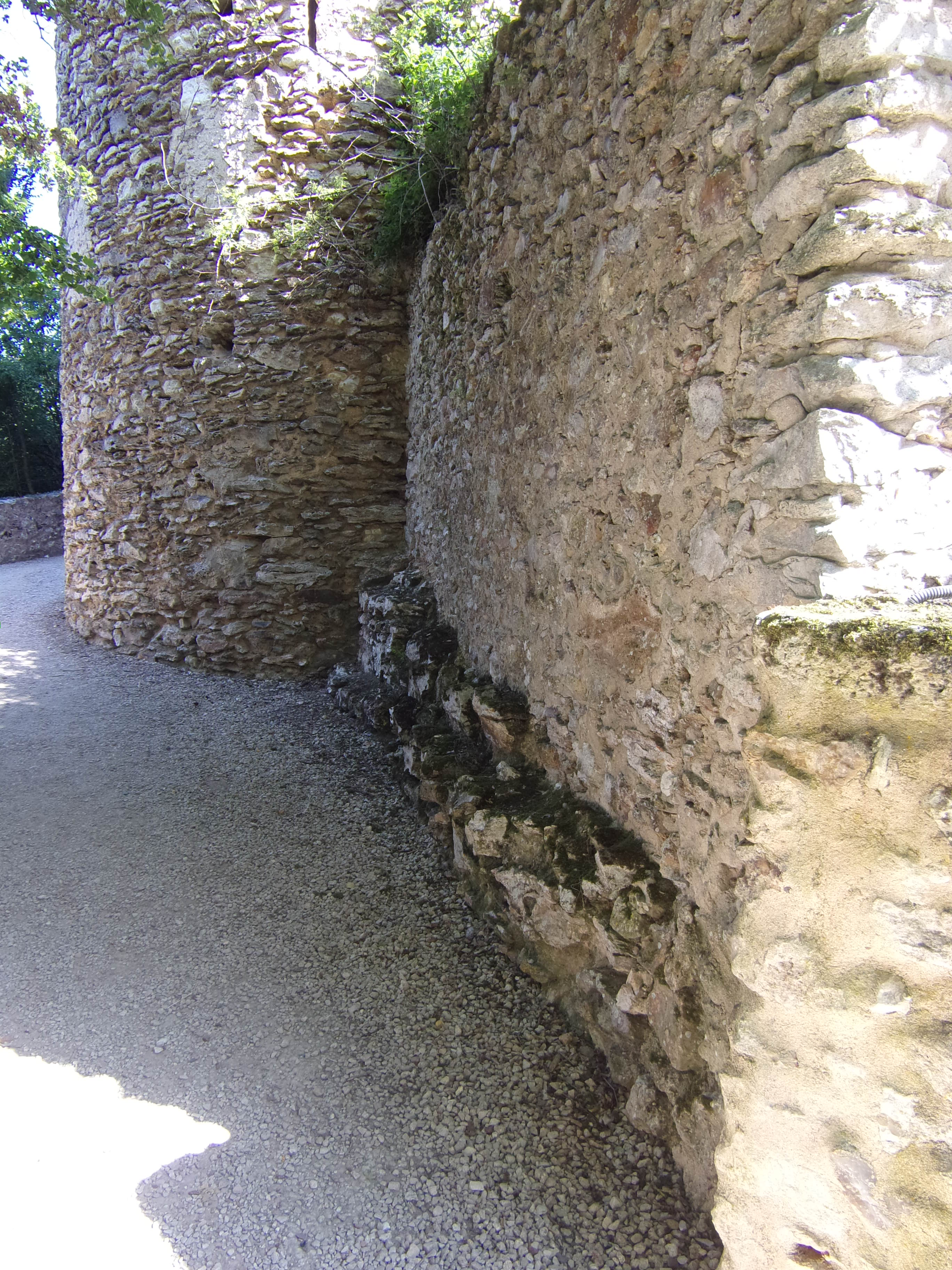
13th-century wall.

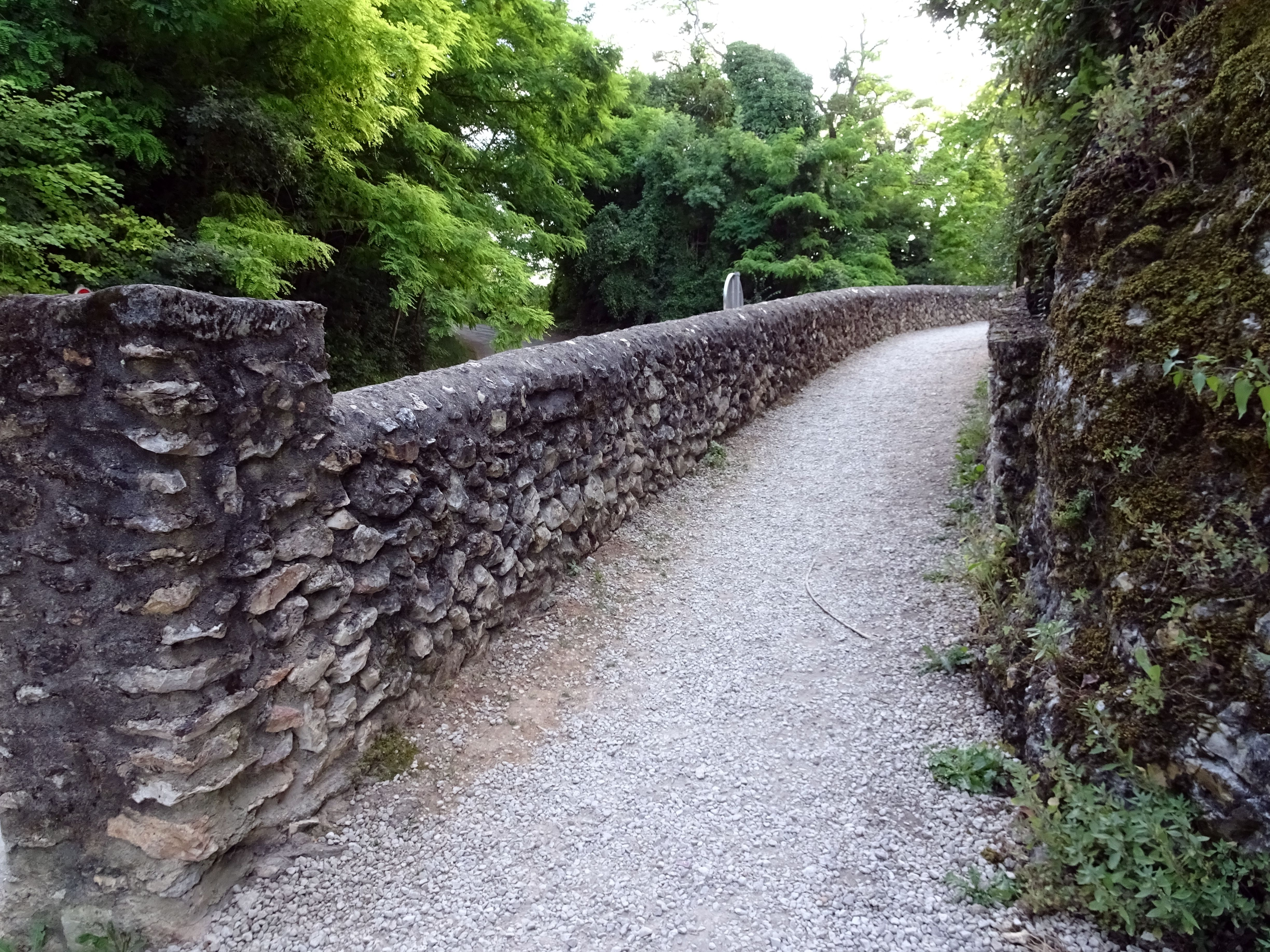
15th-century western enclosure.

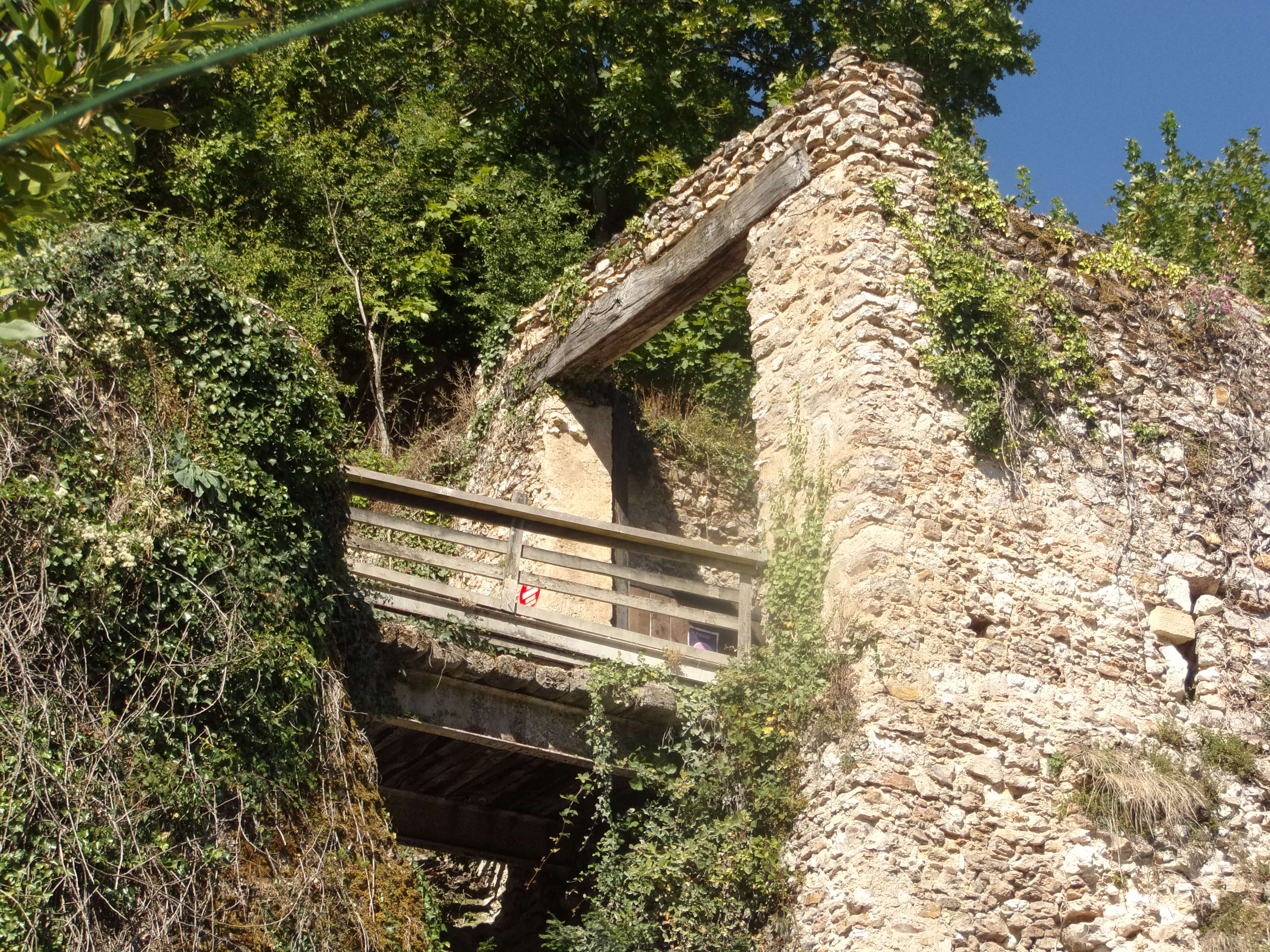
Location of the eastern access drawbridge.

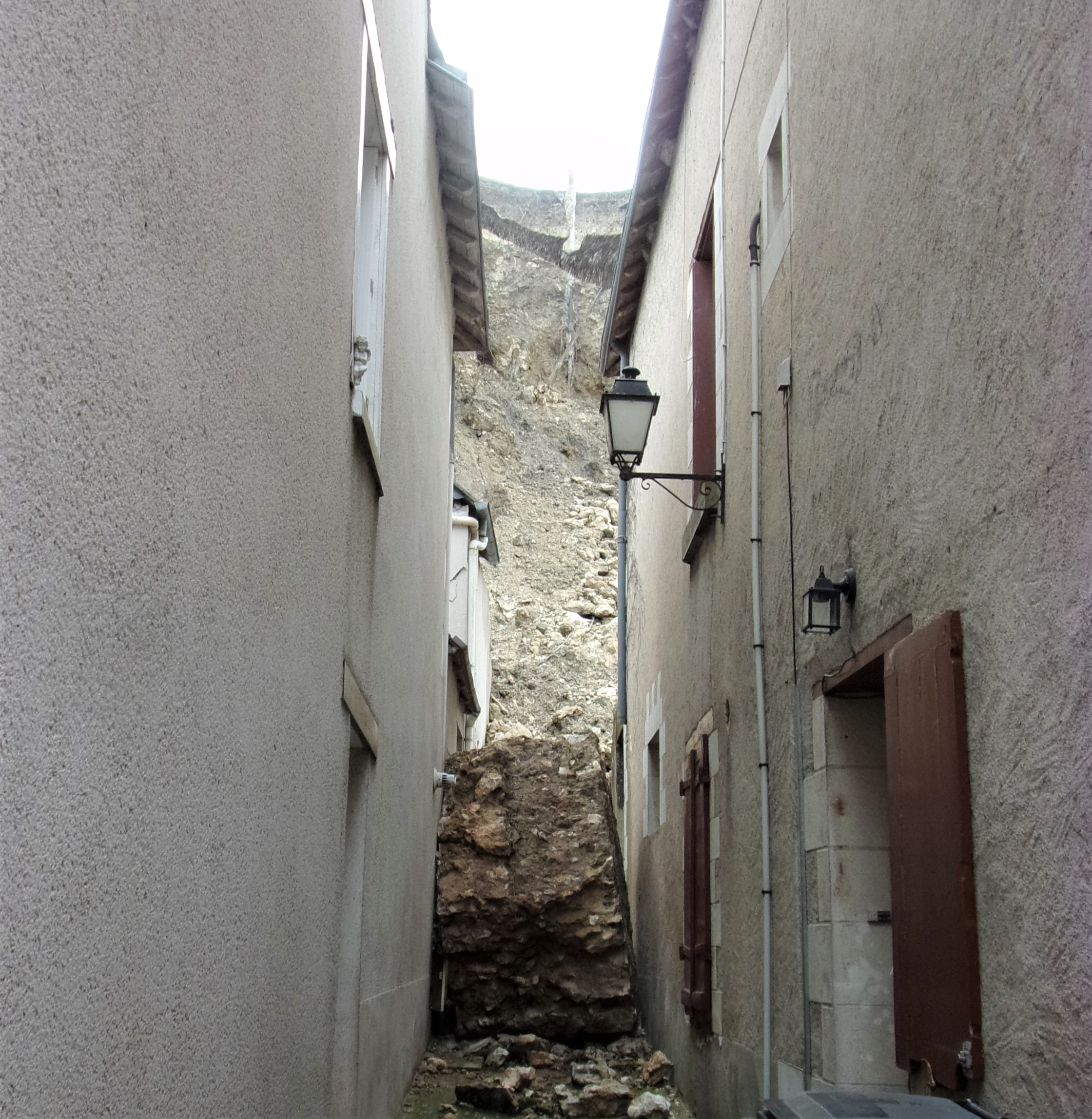
Landslide (December 2019).

== See also ==
- Medieval fortification
- Castle
- Fortification

== Bibliography ==
=== Publications devoted exclusively to the castral site ===
- Atterton, Jacqueline; Atterton, Harry. Montbazon : Indre-et-Loire, le donjon du faucon noir, le plus ancien de France (in French).
- Audin, Pierre (2008). "Le château de Montbazon et ses seigneurs". Le Val de l'Indre (in French) (20): 35–46.
- Bousrez, Louis (1896). "Notice historique et archéologique sur le donjon et le château de Montbazon". Bulletin de la Société archéologique de Touraine (in French). X: 372–379. ISSN 1153-2521. Archived from the original on 7 September 2024.
- Dalayeun, Marie-Denise (2003). Le site castral de Montbazon (Indre-et-Loire) : Étude archéologique de la tour maîtresse : mémoire de maîtrise, histoire de l'art (in French). Vol. I & II. Tours: Université François-Rabelais.
- Dalayeun, Marie-Denise (2003a). "Le site castral de Montbazon, étude archéologique de la tour maîtresse". Bulletin de la Société archéologique de Touraine (in French). XLIX: 75–84. ISSN 1153-2521. Archived from the original on 7 September 2024.
- Dalayeun, Marie-Denise (2014). "Montbazon, le château et la chapelle castrale". Atlas Archéologique de Touraine : 53e supplément à la Revue archéologique du Centre de la France (PDF) (in French). Tours: FERACF. Archived from the original (PDF) on 26 April 2025.
- Dalayeun, Marie-Denise (2016). "Montbazon (Indre-et-Loire). Le château". Archéologie médiévale (in French). 46: 262–263. doi:10.4000/archeomed.7423.
- Deyres, Marcel (1969). "Le château de Montbazon au XIe siècle". Cahiers de civilisation médiévale (in French). 12 (46): 147–159. doi:10.3406/ccmed.1969.1482.
- Faucherre, Nicolas (2002). "Le château de Montbazon". Bulletin des amis du pays lochois (in French) (18): 115–126.
- Vieira, Ludovic (1997). Lilian Whitteker, la dame de Montbazon, exposition rétrospective 12–19 juin 1997 (in French). Joué-les-Tours: Ludovic Vieira.

=== Publications on the archaeology, geography and history of Indre-et-Loir ===
- Audin, Pierre (2001). "Montbazon". Patrimoine des communes d'Indre-et-Loire (in French). Vol. I & II. Paris: Éditions Flohic. ISBN 2-8423-4115-5.
- Audin, Pierre (2012). La Touraine autour de l'an mil : inventaire des sources historiques et archéologiques : Mémoire de la Société archéologique de Touraine (in French). Vol. LXIX.
- Maurice, Jacques (1976). Montbazon et Veigné aux temps jadis (in French). Veigné: Jacques Maurice.
- Ranjard, Robert (1986) [1949]. La Touraine archéologique : guide du touriste en Indre-et-Loire (in French) (3rd ed.). Mayenne: Imprimerie de la Manutention. ISBN 2-85554-017-8.
