= Château de Sainte-Maure-de-Touraine =

French castle

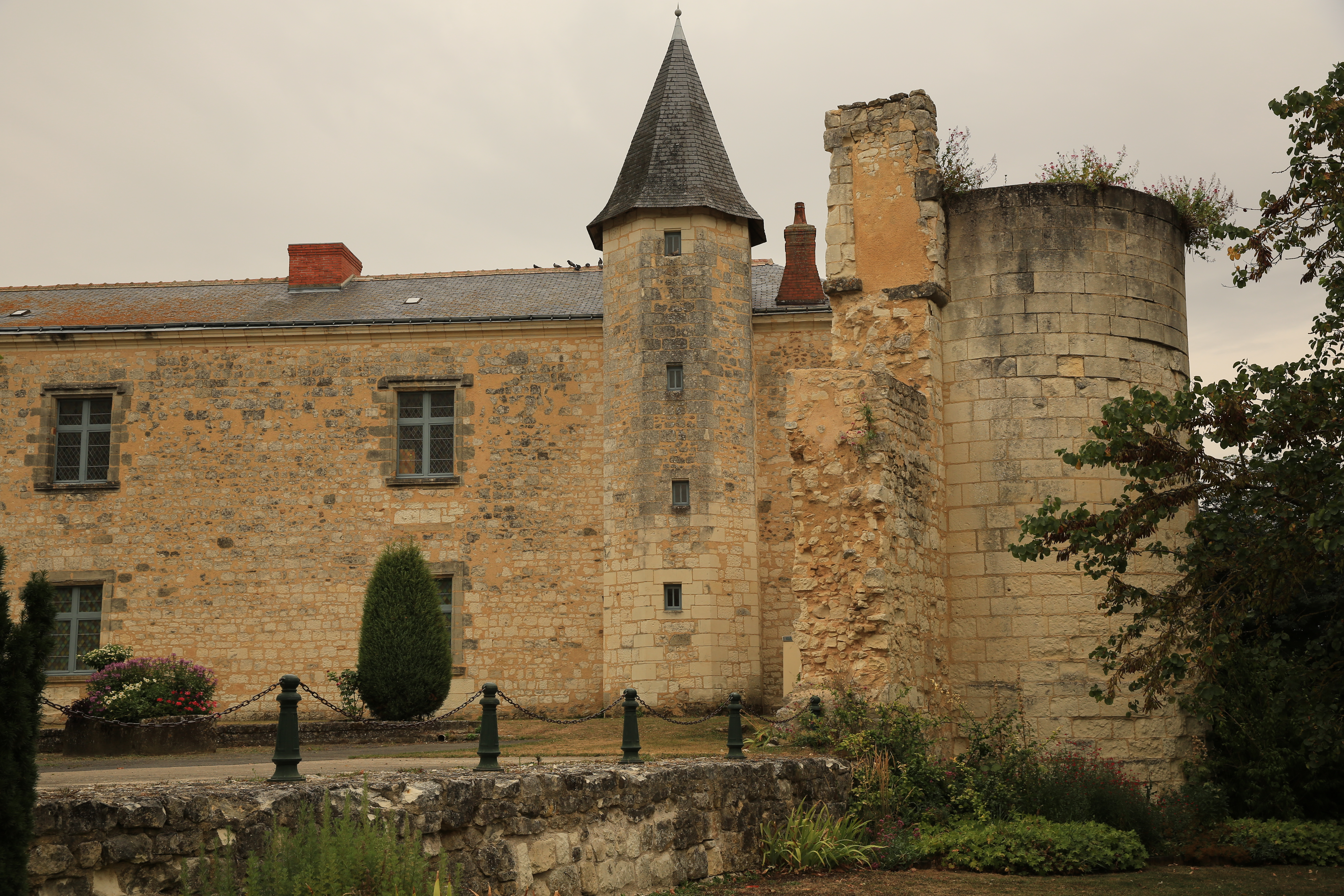
- View of the castle.
- Interactive map of Château de Sainte-Maure-de-Touraine
- Location: Country: France; Region: Centre-Val de Loire; Department: Indre-et-Loire; Arrondissement: Chinon; Municipality: Sainte-Maure-de-Touraine
- Coordinates: 47°06′41″N 0°37′13″E
- Type: Château
- Beginning date: 15th century
- Protection: Listed as a historic monument (1926, Castle); Listed as a historic monument (1936, Entrance tower)

The Château of Saint-Maure-de-Touraine, also known as the Château des Rohan, was built during the 15th century in Sainte-Maure-de-Touraine, in Indre-et-Loire. It was founded by Fulk III of Anjou around 990.

The structure was added to the supplementary inventory of historic monuments in 1926. Its entrance tower was listed in 1936.

It currently houses a heritage center.

== Geographical context ==
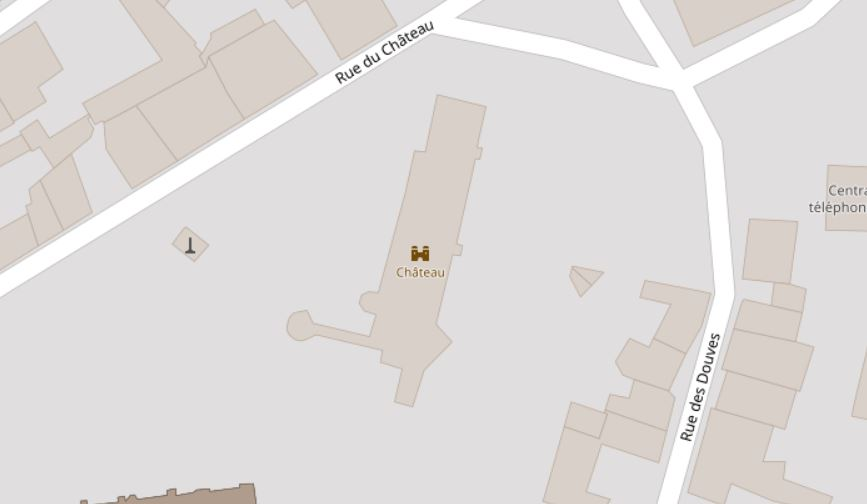
Floor plan of the castle and its urban surroundings.

The château is located in the historic center of Sainte-Maure-de-Touraine, a commune in the arrondissement of Chinon, within the department of Indre-et-Loire in the Centre-Val de Loire region. The former fortress occupies, together with the church of Sainte-Maure–Sainte-Britte situated approximately 50 m to the southwest, a circular promontory shaped like a large “mamelon,” surrounded by built-up areas along its slopes.

The promontory on which the château was constructed has relatively level terrain. The château, whose seigneurial residence occupies the highest point, overlooks the Manse valley.

== History ==
=== Middle Ages ===
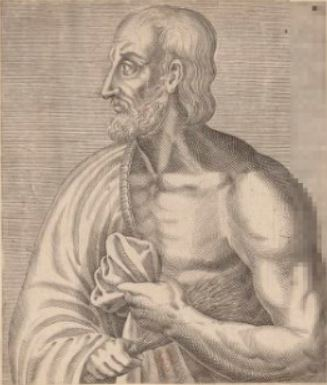
Foulques Nerra, founder of the castle.

Before the year 1000, around 990, a wooden keep was constructed on the promontory of Sainte-Maure-en-Touraine at the initiative of Fulk III of Anjou. It was later replaced by a stone fortress comparable to those of Langeais or Montbazon.

In 1203, the fortified structure was destroyed. This action was likely carried out by William des Roches on the orders of King John of England. Girard d’Athée, also a vassal of the English king, was tasked with imprisoning individuals who had violated their ban.

- In the first half of the 1210s, between 1212 and 1215, Guillaume de Pressigny—identified as Guillaume II in his capacity as “lord of the château and the land of Sainte-Maure,” and as Guillaume I in his capacity as lord of Pressigny, attested since 1190 and deceased after 1209—rebuilt the château. A supporter of Philip Augustus, he also constructed the Château du Grand-Pressigny. His father-in-law, Guillaume I of Sainte-Maure (born circa 1130–1135, died circa 1205–1209), father of Avoye/Avoise/Hawise, was the heir of the first seigneurial family of Sainte-Maure. (Note: 1° According to Father Anselme, the first family of Sainte-Maure was established as follows: Goscelin I, active in 1007, died before 1030, had by his wife Aremburge: Gosbert, Guillaume, and Hugues I; the latter married Aénor, daughter of Berlay of Montreuil-Bellay and Adélaïs, daughter of Gilduin/Gelduin the Elder of Saumur, from whom Hugues and Goscelin II were born. Goscelin II, active between 1037 and 1060, married Cassinotte of La Haye; their children were Goscelin III and Hugues (these two brothers were killed—around 1102/1106?—by their own mutinous soldiers at La Haye; Goscelin III supported Foulques V of Anjou against Henry I in the years 1110–1120; another Hugues of Sainte-Maure, probably descended from one of these two brothers, instigated the revolt of Eleanor and her sons against Henry II in 1172), and our Guillaume I of Sainte-Maure (circa 1140–circa 1205/1209), whose daughter Avoye/Avoise married Guillaume de Pressigny (numbered I of Pressigny and II of Sainte-Maure). 2° According to the indexed sites of Hélène & Thierry Bianco (2011): Goscelin/Josselin I (active 1007, 1009) had for sons Josselin II the Poitevin (active between 1032 and before 1060, or possibly after 1078?; married Aremburge), himself father of Josbert (cleric), Guillaume, Bellutia/Bélutea (wife of Aymery/Hémery Payen of Mirebeau and Montbazon?), Jachite, and their elder brother Hugues I. The latter (active circa 1060–circa 1115/1116) married secondly, around 1070/1075, Aénor/Adenorde of Montreuil-Bellay (after a first marriage with a daughter of Jean of Chinon, from whom a first son Guillaume, who died before 1086/93), daughter of Berlay II and Grécie (daughter of Hamelin of Langeais), and granddaughter of Berlay I of Montreuil-Bellay and a daughter of Gilduin the Elder of Saumur. Hugues I and Aénor had: Hugues (II) (married Cassinotte/Cassamota of La Haye; possibly remarried to Jean I of Montbazon?), Pierre (died after 1115), another Guillaume (predeceased before 1100 or 1115), Marquissa/Marquise, Denise/Dionisa/Dionysia (died around 1096; married Josbert of Nouâtre), and Josselin/Goscelin (III) (predeceased around 1102/1106 with his younger brother Hugues (II) in an ambush set by their rebellious soldiers; married Falcabelle). Josselin (III) and Falcabelle were the parents of Hugues II or III (active 1117 to his death circa 1180; he instigated the revolt of Henry and Richard against their father Henry II Plantagenêt; married Aélidis/Avis/Avoise of Montgauger), from whom came Josbert, Josselin/Goscelin (died after 1180), Agathe, Agnès, and our Guillaume I of Sainte-Maure (1130/1135–1205/1209), father of Avoise/Hawise, born around 1155/1165 and died after 1209.)

Guillaume de Pressigny and his wife Avoye/Avoise of Sainte-Maure (born circa 1155–1165; married circa 1170–1180) had several children: Hugues, canon of Saint-Martin de Tours and prior of Loches; Aremburge/Aremberge; Garcie; Pétronille; Domitia; and:

- Guillaume III or II (died circa 1218–1223 without descendants; known as Guillaume III of Sainte-Maure and Guillaume II of Pressigny) was succeeded by his younger brother Josbert I, born circa 1175–1185 or around 1190 and deceased after 1245. Active between 1223 and 1229, Josbert I was a participant in the crusade of 1229 and held the lordships of Pressigny/Précigny, Sainte-Maure, Nouâtre, and Bridoré. He married Agnès, probably the daughter of Jean IV of Vendôme. Josbert I and Agnès of Vendôme had the following children: Josbert, chancellor of Saint-Martin of Tours in 1245; Renaud, very likely Marshal Renaud of Précigny, who died in 1270 in Tunisia during Saint Louis’s last crusade and was the ancestor of the Regnault de Précigny family, lords of Laleu and Marans; and their eldest brother:
- Guillaume IV or III (c. 1215/1225–1271), active from 1230 onward and likely a participant in Louis IX’s crusade in Tunis in 1270, died in 1271. He married Jeanne de Rancon (c. 1220–1302), daughter of Geoffroy IV or V de Rancon and Jeanne Maingot de Surgères, viscountess of Aulnay. Jeanne de Rancon was lady of Marcillac, a Rancon fief comparable to Taillebourg, and the sister of Amable de Rancon, lady of Taillebourg and wife of Guillaume V de Parthenay.

The children of Guillaume IV–III and Jeanne de Rancon de Marcillac were: Pierre (I) (died after 1328), husband of Mahaut/Mathilde (died c. 1328/1334), lord of Montgaugier and ancestor of the Sainte-Maure branch, which later held the titles of counts of Joigny and Jonzac, marquises of Nesle and Montgaugier, and dukes of Montausier; Isabeau de Sainte-Maure, wife of Philippe de Prie de Buzançais de Montpoupon; and their eldest son:

- Guillaume V (or IV), called “the Valet,” was born circa 1235/1245 or around 1250 and died circa 1296/1300. He was active between 1270 and 1274. He married, first in 1270, Isabelle, daughter of Jean I de Berrie d’Amboise, and subsequently, around 1274, Agnès de Pons, widow of Savari IV of Thouars.
- Their son, Guillaume VI–V, also called “the Valet” (born circa 1270/1271 and died circa 1290/1300), is frequently confused with his father, although the historian Arthur Bertrand de Broussillon distinguishes the two. He married around 1288/1290 Alix/Aaliz, daughter of Savary IV de Thouars and Agnès de Pons mentioned above, and he died before 1315.
- The heiress Isabelle/Isabeau, daughter of Guillaume VI and Aaliz de Thouars (born circa 1285/1290 and died in 1310), held the lordships of Sainte-Maure, Pressigny/Précigny, Nouâtre, Marcillac, Ferrière-Larçon, (Note: Ferrière near Beaulieu-lès-Loches, mentioned in earlier versions of this article, does not appear to be involved here: it is the site of a priory founded by Dreu de Mello and under the authority of the royal castle of Loches (Carré de Busserolle 1884, pp. 62–65, .)) and Verneuil-sur-Indre. She transmitted these fiefs to her husband, Amaury III de Craon, whom she married in 1300/1301, and subsequently to their son, Maurice VI or VII de Craon (born circa 1304 and died in 1330).

During the 14th century, Amaury III de Craon (born circa 1280 and died in 1333), then lord of the site, initiated a reconstruction campaign that included the addition of curtain walls and towers to the château’s enclosure. Around 1370, Constable Bertrand du Guesclin is reported to have expelled a group of mercenaries who had occupied the fortress.

The Craon family continued to hold Sainte-Maure. After Amaury IV (1326–30 May 1373), son of Maurice VI–VII de Craon and Marguerite de Mello-Saint-Bris, lady of Jarnac, Châteauneuf, and Sainte-Hermine, died without legitimate offspring, the succession passed to his sister Isabelle (Isabeau) de Craon. In 1376, ownership then transferred to their niece.

- Jeanne de Montbazon, daughter of Renaud, lord of Montbazon, Savonnières, Montsoreau, Villandry/Colombiers, Le Brandon, Marnes, and Moncontour, and of Jeanne (Eleanor) de Craon, the younger sister of Amaury IV and Isabeau de Craon, married in 1372 Guillaume II de Craon (ca. 1345–1410; Guillaume VII of Sainte-Maure), viscount of Châteaudun and lord of Marcillac, who was a first cousin of her mother. Through this marriage, Jeanne de Montbazon transmitted to him the lordships of Sainte-Maure, Le Grand-Pressigny, Nouâtre, Ferrière and Verneuil, Jarnac and Châteauneuf-sur-Charente, Montbazon, Savonnières, Montsoreau, Villandry, Le Brandon, Marnes, and Moncontour.
- Three of Jeanne de Montbazon and Guillaume II de Craon’s children inherited Sainte-Maure. The first was Guillaume III de Craon (Guillaume VIII of Sainte-Maure), viscount of Châteaudun, who died without issue around 1400. He was succeeded by his younger brother Jean de Craon, Grand Échanson of France in 1413, who was killed at the Battle of Agincourt in 1415, also without issue. The inheritance then passed to their sister Marguerite de Craon, lady of Sainte-Maure, Nouâtre, Marcillac, Châteauneuf-sur-Charente, Montbazon, and Le Brandon. Other fiefs, including Pressigny, Montsoreau, Villandry/Colombiers, and Jarnac, were transmitted to their younger sister Marie de Craon, who married Louis I Chabot, lord of La Grève.

Marguerite de Craon, born around 1370, married Guy VIII de La Rochefoucauld (c. 1355–c. 1428) in 1395. The estates of Sainte-Maure, Nouâtre, Montbazon, and Le Brandon passed to their younger son Aymar de La Rochefoucauld (died around 1460), who married Jeanne de Martreuil, lady of Hérisson-en-Gâtine. These estates were then successively inherited by three of his children: Jean (died 1465), Françoise (who married Jean d’Estouteville de Torcy), and Jeanne de La Rochefoucauld (died around 1500), who married Jean du Fou, Grand Butler and bailiff of Touraine. Their daughter Renée du Fou married first Louis III de Rohan-Guémené (died 1498) and then William de La Marck (died 1516). Descendants of her marriage to Louis III de Rohan-Guémené later held the titles of counts (1547, Louis VI) and dukes of Montbazon (1588, Louis VII), retaining the estates of Sainte-Maure, Nouâtre, Le Brandon, and La Haye.

The mid-15th century saw significant reconstruction at the castle. Between 1436 and 1455, Aymar III de La Rochefoucauld constructed polygonal towers, giving the castle its nearly final form.

=== Modern period ===
During the modern era, up to the French Revolution, the castle was successively held by several noble families, including the d’Estouteville, du Fou, de La Marck, and Rohan-Guéméné, through inheritance or marriage. Most of the lords of Sainte-Maure-de-Touraine rarely resided in the castle, with the exception of Louis III and Hercule-Mériadec de Rohan-Guéméné, who both died there.

In 1560, King Francis II and his wife, Mary Stuart, stayed at the castle.

In 1605, Philippe Duplessis-Mornay met Henry IV at the castle. In 1619, as part of the peace treaty with her son Louis XIII, Queen Mother Marie de’ Medici traveled to the fortress of Sainte-Maure before proceeding to the Château de Couzières in the parish of Veigné, the official site of the “reconciliation.” On 8 July 1661, Louis XIV, returning from Saint-Jean-de-Luz where he had just signed a treaty, and accompanied by his wife Maria Theresa of Austria, stopped at the Château de Sainte-Maure. During this brief stay, the king granted amnesty to all the prisoners held in the castle’s dungeons.

=== Contemporary period ===
In 1836, the seigneurial residence was used as quarters for the gendarmerie. In 1838, the municipality of Sainte-Maure-de-Touraine purchased the castle for 8,000 francs and carried out renovations to accommodate kindergarten and boys’ primary school classrooms. The castle functioned as a school from 1848 to 1968.

On 12 November 1926, the castle was listed in the supplementary inventory of historic monuments, and on 30 June 1936, the fortified entrance tower was also listed.

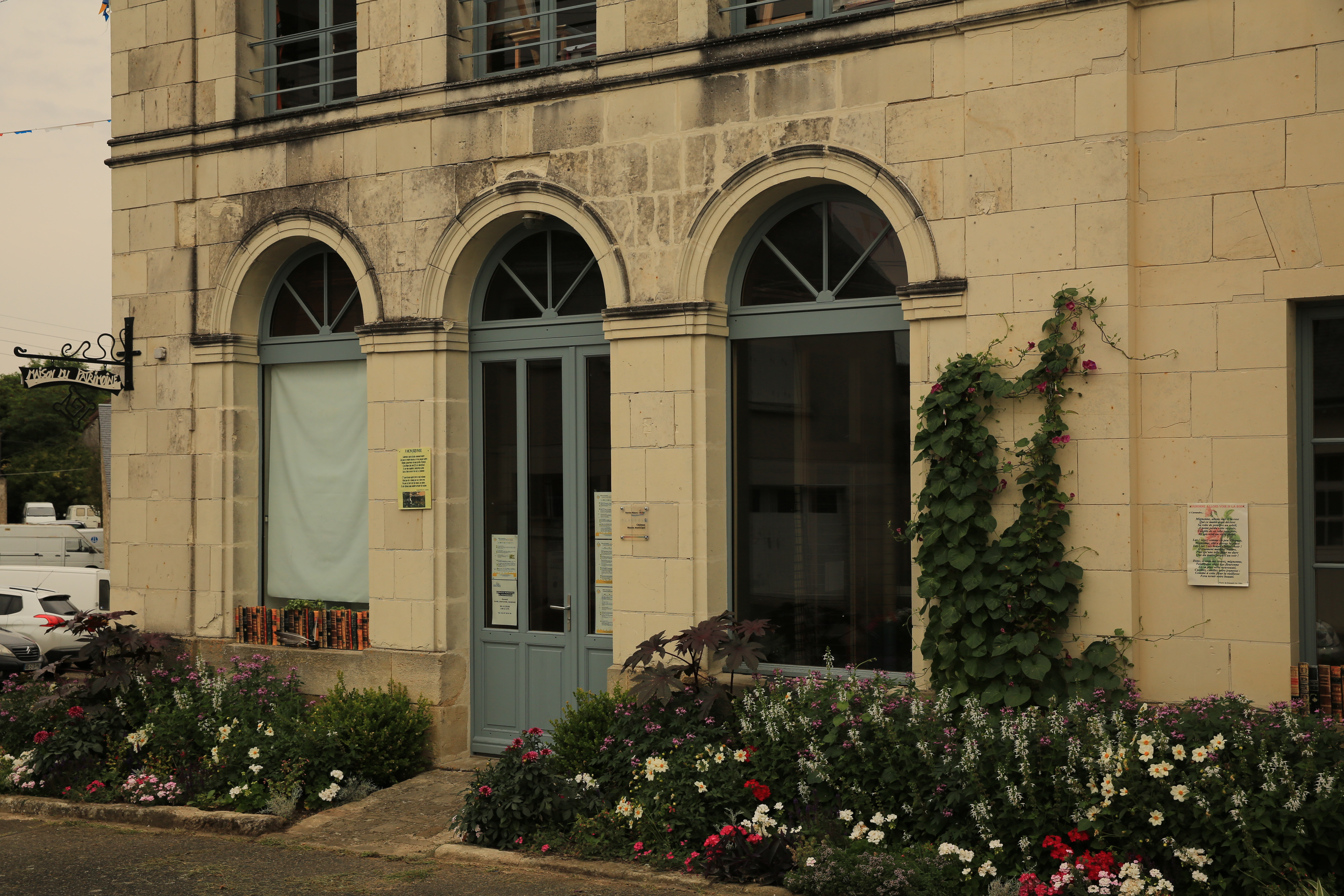
The heritage house.

In the late 1970s, three ground-floor rooms of the castle were converted to house a museum, which included collections of documents and objects related to the town’s history, fossils and minerals, as well as art and items reflecting local traditions. Administered by the municipal tourist office, the museum received a collection of ceramic artifacts in 1995. In the 2010s, it was transformed into a heritage center, with a program emphasizing temporary exhibitions.

The interior of the castle is now occupied by the heritage center.

== Architecture and description ==
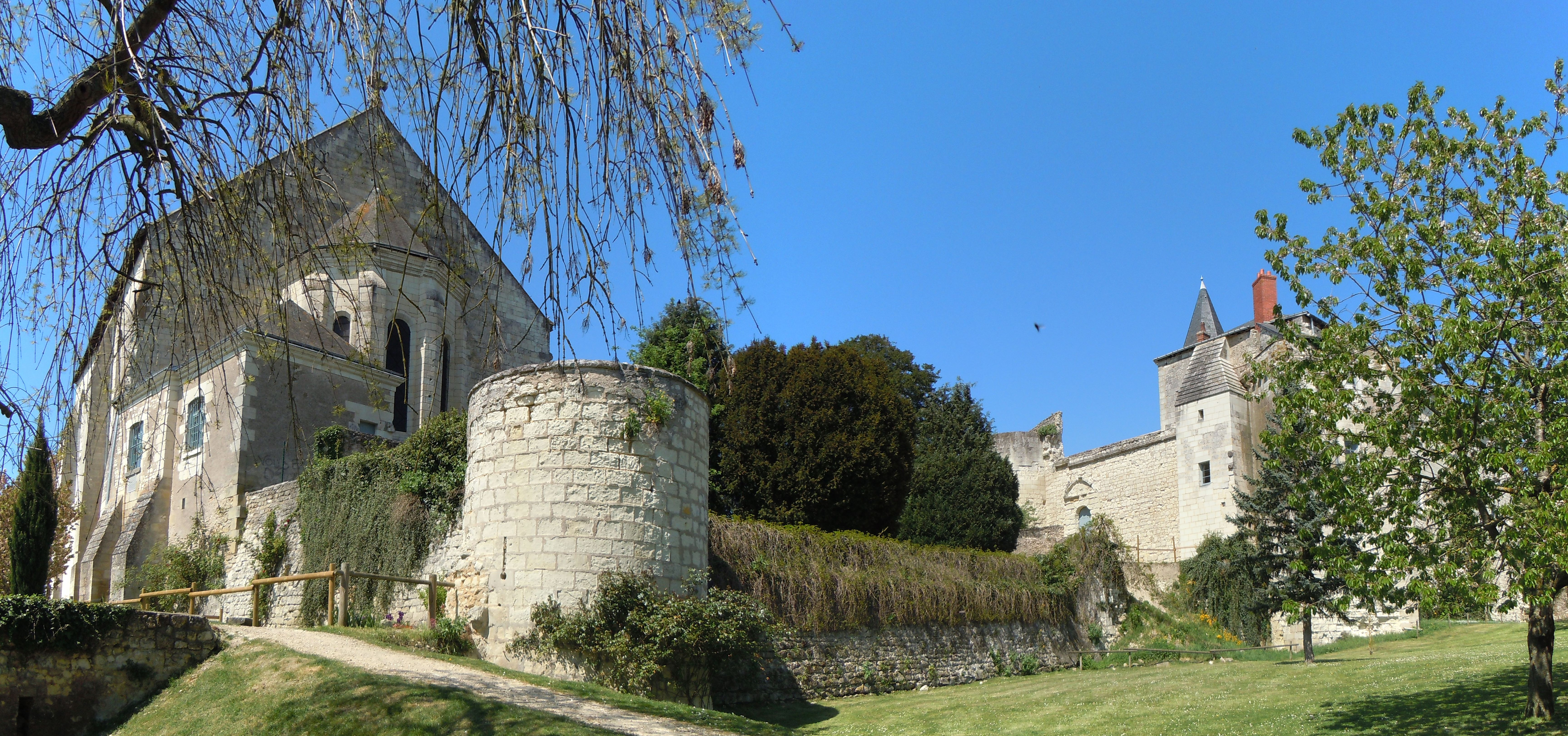
Curtain wall and circular tower, the church of Sainte-Maure-Sainte-Britte, on the left, leaning against the castle's surrounding wall.

In its first phase of construction, toward the end of the 10th century, the Château de Sainte-Maure consisted of a keep built of wood. This wooden structure was later replaced by a stone building with a square plan. During the same period, the castle was fortified with a defensive wall composed of a palisade and a ditch. In the second half of the 11th century, shortly after 1050, a domicilium was built within the castle enclosure. According to Marcel Deyres, it is probable that the crypt of the church of Sainte-Maure-Sainte-Britte was originally intended to serve as the Great Hall of the domicilium, located beneath the current choir. Similarly, it is possible that, as part of the initial construction program, the nave of this church was intended to form the ground floor of the domicilium. The construction of the domicilium, however, was never completed.

After the dismantling of the stone-built castle in the 13th century, a new phase of reconstruction took place in the late Middle Ages. Several elements from the 14th century remain, including the east-facing wall of the seigneurial residence, protected at one end by a square tower, and the south curtain wall, defended by a semi-cylindrical tower. The remnants of this phase also include a circular, partially leveled tower and the fortified entrance tower. A 1696 document by Froger de la Carlière, inspector general of the possessions of Charles I of Rohan, lord of Sainte-Maure-de-Touraine, describes the fortress and its surroundings: “The castle consists of several buildings surrounded by old walls, beyond which are two gardens on the side of the church of Sainte-Maure and a third on the eastern side, which formerly served as a tennis court, next to which there is an empty space called ‘La Douve,’ which belongs to the said castle.” Of all the buildings listed at the end of the 17th century, only the main residence survives.

Access to the castle is through an entrance tower with a square ground plan. The original crowning structure of the tower no longer exists. It was equipped with a drawbridge, and the grooves that held the pivots of the lifting arms remain above the doorway. An upper-floor room is located above the entrance gate.

A public road, built in the first half of the 19th century, passes through the castle courtyard.

The main residence has two stories, with evidence on the south wall of a “blind” story that may have contained cellars, storage rooms, or dungeons. The former roof had two steeply pitched slopes.

In the 15th century, two polygonal towers were added to flank the main block of the residence. Constructed during the fourth phase of building, each tower contained a spiral staircase. Only the south tower survived modifications made during the 19th-century conversion of the castle for use as a school.

Views of the castle

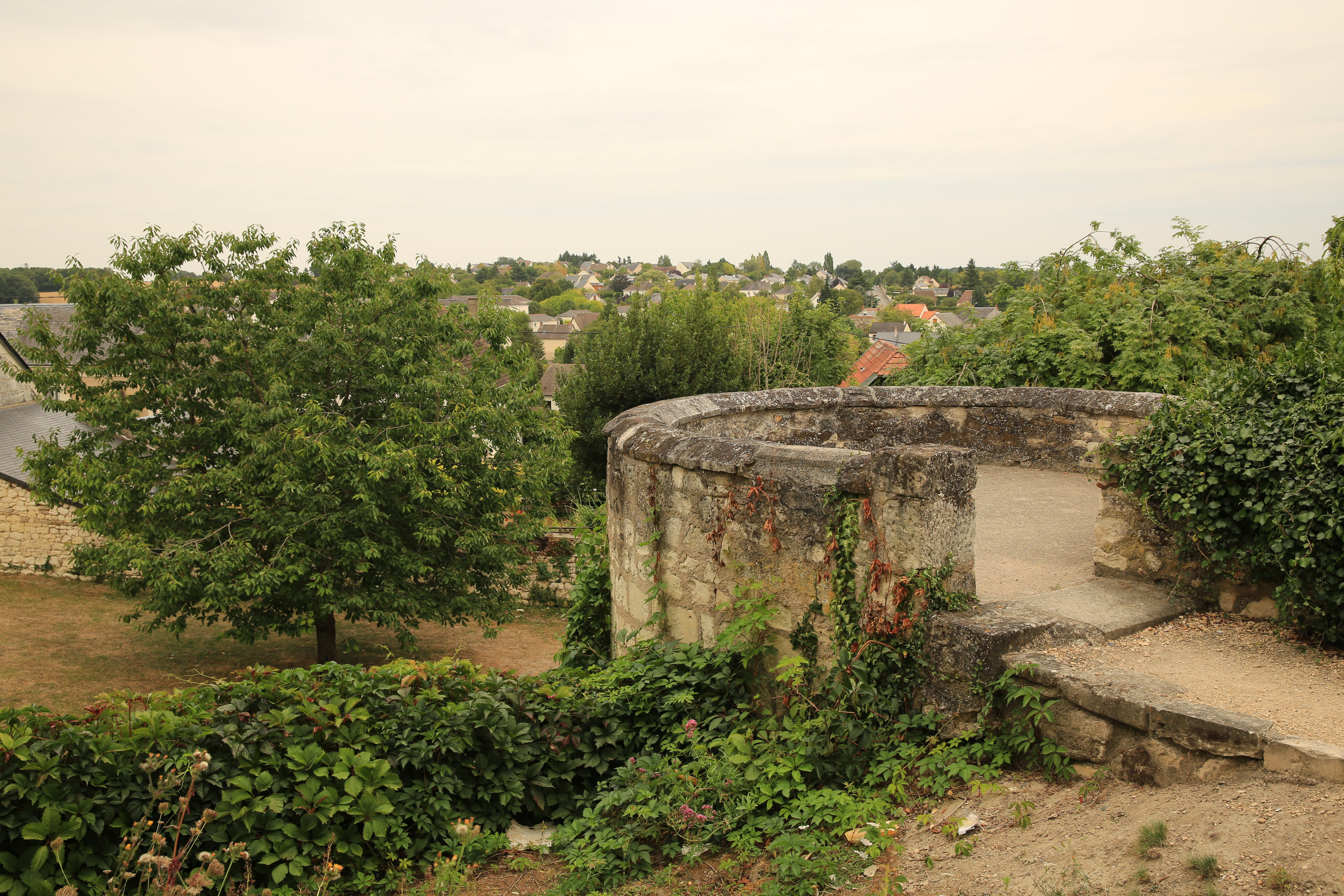
Semicircular tower.

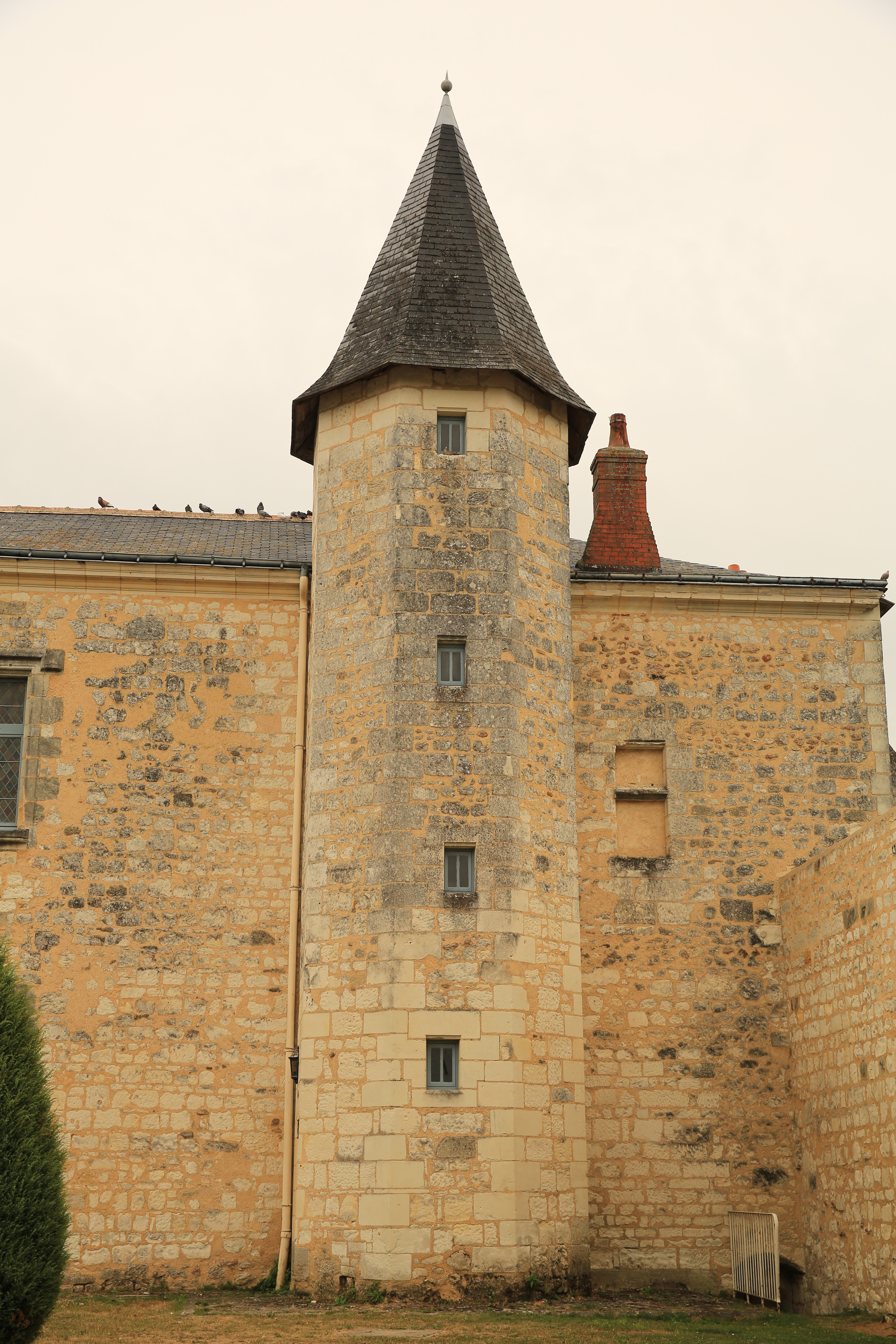
Polygonal tower.

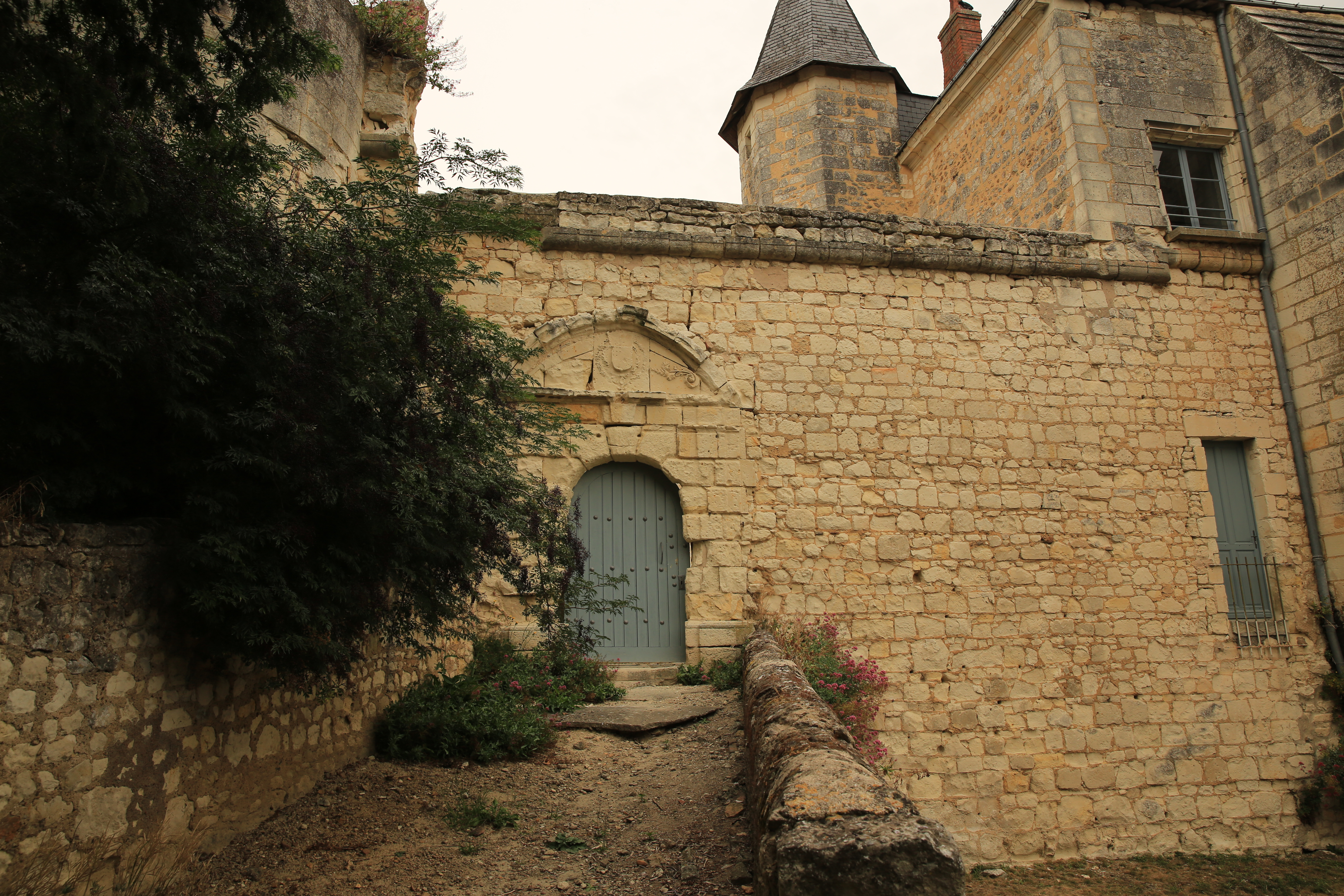
Facade.

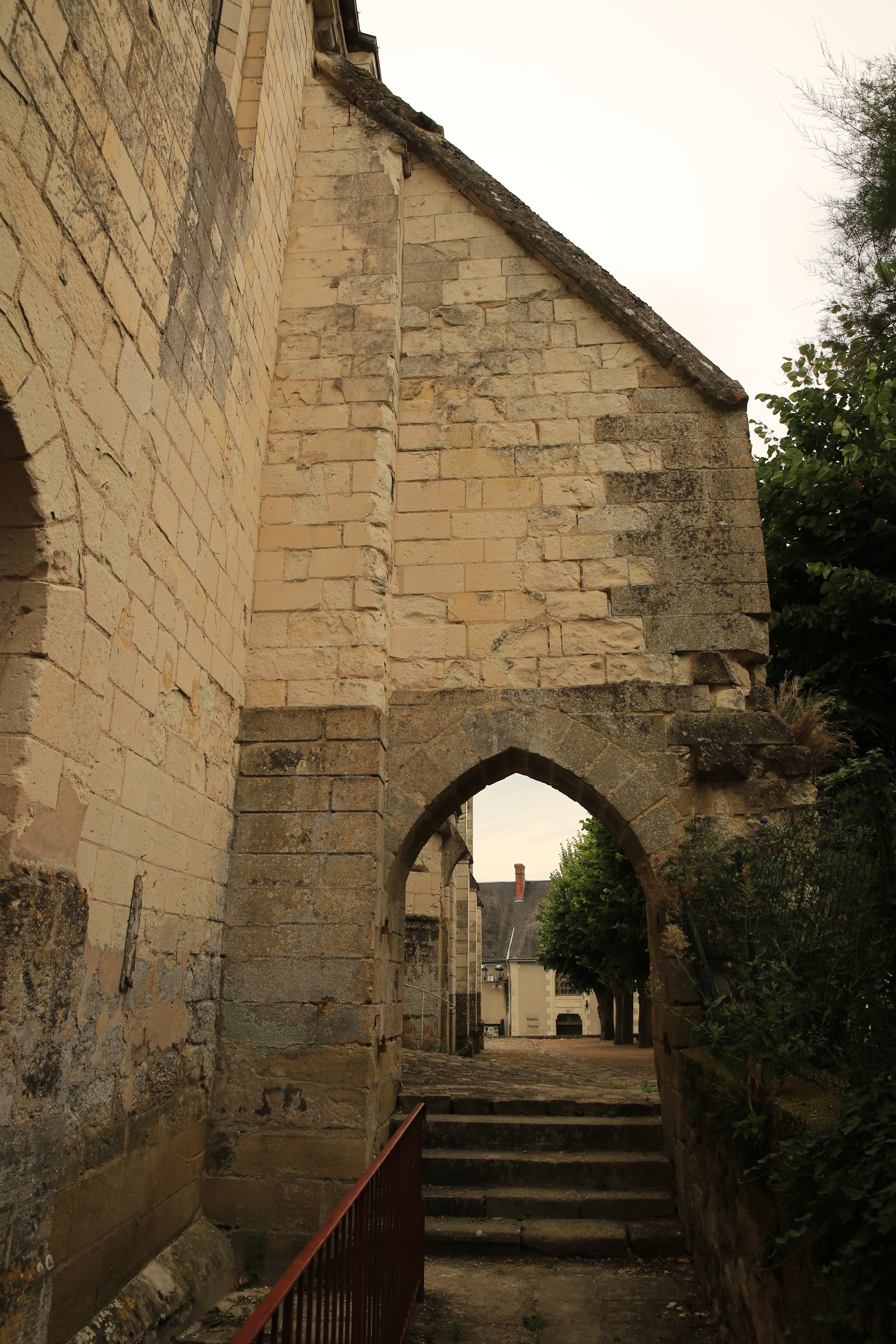
Enclosing wall (right).

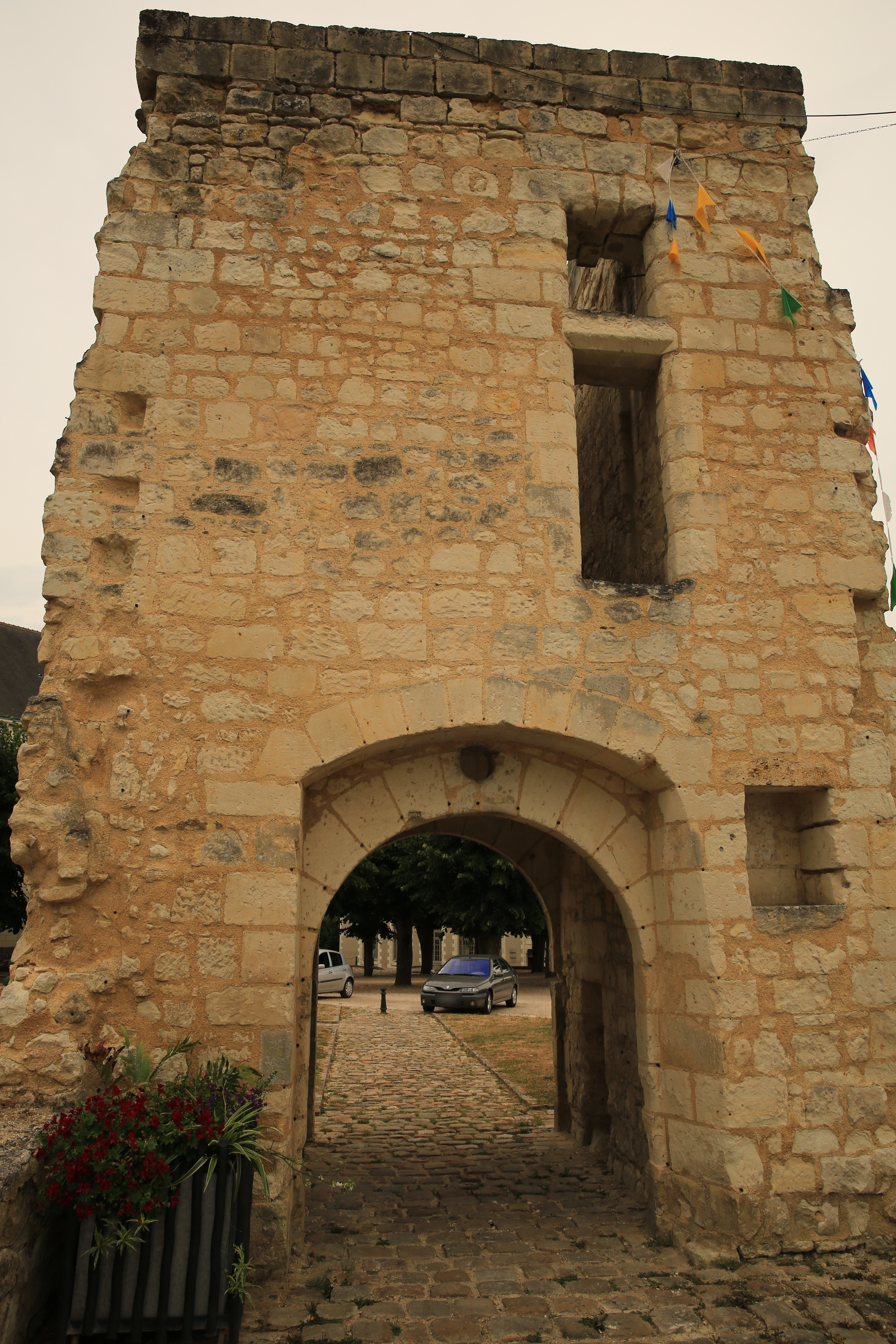
Entrance tower.

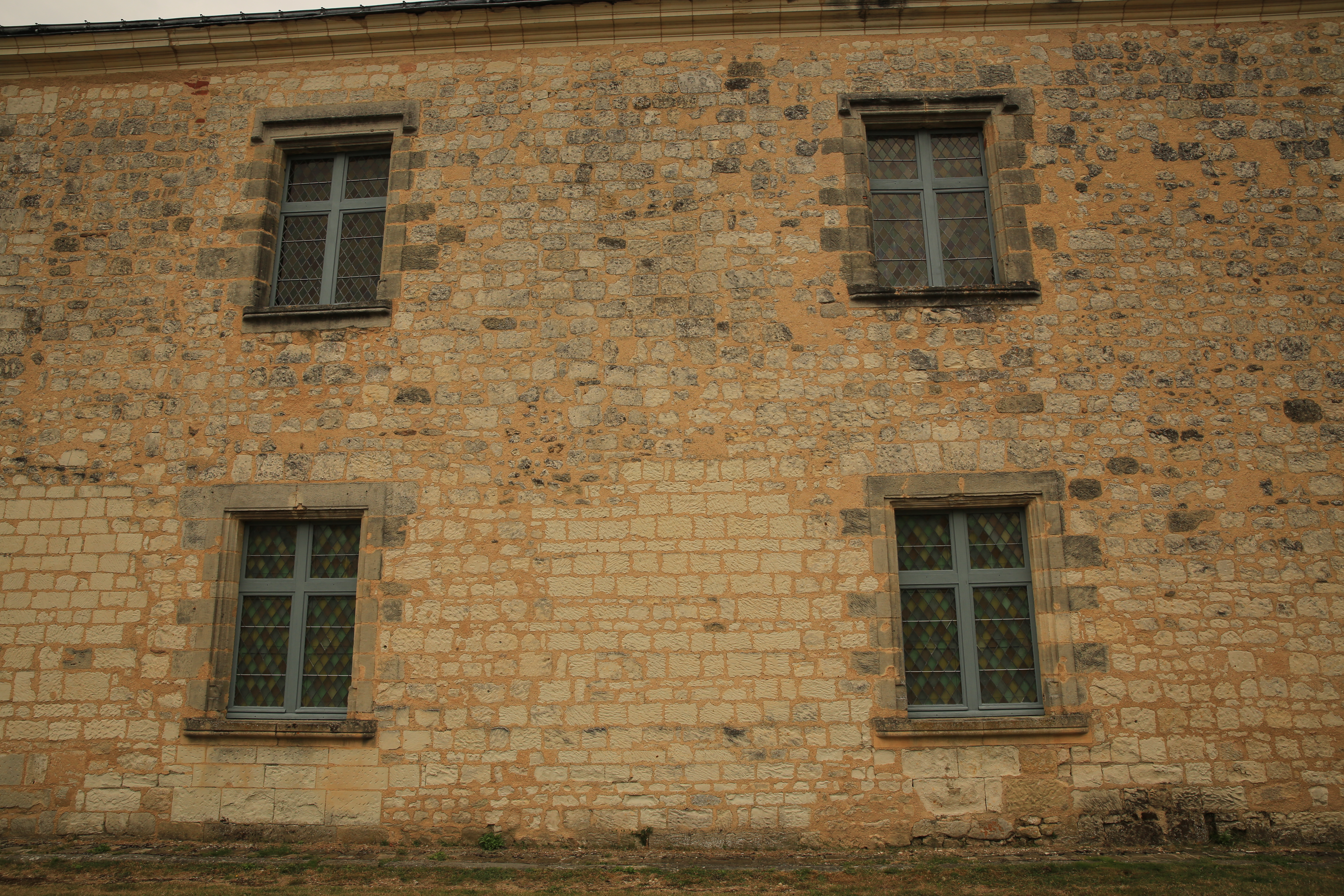
Facade.

== See also ==
- Monument historique
- Fulk III, Count of Anjou
- Sainte-Maure-de-Touraine
- Arrondissement of Chinon

== Bibliography ==
- Carré de Busserolle, Jacques-Xavier (1884). "Maure (Sainte-)". Dictionnaire géographique, historique et biographique d'Indre-et-Loire et de l'ancienne province de Touraine [Geographical, historical, and biographical dictionary of Indre-et-Loire and the former province of Touraine]. Mémoires de la Société archéologique de Touraine (in French). Vol. IV. Tours: Société archéologique de Touraine. pp. 224, 225.
- Leveel, Pierre (1994). La Touraine disparue et ses abords immédiats [The vanished Touraine region and its immediate surroundings] (in French). Chambray-lès-Tours: C.L.D. éditions.
- Loiseau de Grandmaison, Charles (1891). Archives ecclésiastiques antérieures à 1790 : inventaire sommaire de la série H - Clergé régulier - H1 987 [Ecclesiastical archives prior to 1790: summary inventory of series H - Regular clergy - H1 987] (PDF) (in French). Archives départementales de Tours. Archived from the original (PDF) on May 18, 2014.
- Montrot, E (1945). "Le domaine seigneurial de Sainte-Maure au XVIIe siècle" [The seigneurial estate of Sainte-Maure in the 17th century]. Bulletin des Amis du vieux Chinon (in French). 4 (10): 527–535.
- Montrot, E (1946). "Les seigneurs de Sainte-Maure" [The lords of Sainte-Maure]. Bulletin des Amis du vieux Chinon (in French). 5 (1): 28–44.
- Unknown (2016). "Le château" [The castle] (PDF). La lettre des Amis du patrimoine de Sainte-Maure-de-Touraine et de sa région (in French) (12). Amis du Patrimoine de Sainte-Maure-de-Touraine et de sa région.
