= Le Noyer =

Le Noyer may refer to the following communes in France:

- Le Noyer, Hautes-Alpes, in the Hautes-Alpes département
- Le Noyer, Cher, in the Cher département
- Le Noyer, Savoie, in the Savoie département
- Le Noyer-en-Ouche, in the Eure département

== See also ==
- Noyers (disambiguation)
