= Gironde's 11th constituency =

Constituency of the National Assembly of France

11th constituency of Gironde
- inline Constituency of the National Assembly of France

- Location of constituency in Department

- Location of Gironde in France
- Deputy: Edwige Diaz; RN
- Department: Gironde
- Cantons: (pre-2015) Blaye, Bourg, Coutras, Guîtres, Saint-André-de-Cubzac, Saint-Ciers-sur-Gironde, Saint-Savin.

The 11th constituency of the Gironde (French: Onzième circonscription de la Gironde) is a French legislative constituency in Gironde département. Like the other 576 French constituencies, it elects one MP using the two-round system, with a run-off if no candidate receives over 50% of the vote in the first round.

== Historical representation ==
Election	Member	Party
1988	Bernard Madrelle	PS
1993	Daniel Picotin	UDF
1997	Bernard Madrelle	PS
2002	Bernard Madrelle	PS
2007	Philippe Plisson	PS
2012	Philippe Plisson	PS
2017	Véronique Hammerer	LREM
2022	Edwige Diaz	RN
2024	Edwige Diaz	RN

== Election results ==
=== 2024 ===
Candidate	Party	Alliance	First round			Second round		
Candidate	Party	Alliance	Votes	%	+/–	Votes	%	+/–
Edwige Diaz	RN		34,590	53.33	+13.91			
Véronique Hammerer	REN	Ensemble	14,619	22.54	-1.18			
Célia Fonseca	LFI	NFP	14,287	22.03	-0.72			
Zina Ahmimou	LO		1,359	2.10	+1.40			
Votes			64,855	100.00				
Valid votes			64,855	96.17	-1.37			
Blank votes			1,778	2.64	+0.94			
Null votes			804	1.19	+0.43			
Turnout			67,437	67.44	+18.29			
Abstentions			32,559	32.56	-18.29			
Registered voters			99,996					
Result			RN HOLD					

=== 2022 ===
Legislative Election 2022: Gironde's 11th constituency
Party	Candidate	Votes	%	±%
RN	Edwige Diaz	18,662	39.42	+15.77
LREM (Ensemble)	Véronique Hammerer	11,230	23.72	-4.07
LFI (NUPÉS)	Mathieu Caillaud	10,768	22.75	+1.22
DIV	Caroline Goguet	1,318	2.78	N/A
REC	Caroline Chalopin	1,127	2.38	N/A
PRG	Bastien Noury	1,096	2.32	N/A
Others	N/A	3,137	6.63	
Turnout		47,338	49.15	+1.26
2nd round result
RN	Edwige Diaz	25,092	58.70	+15.72
LREM (Ensemble)	Véronique Hammerer	17,653	41.30	−15.72
Turnout		42,745	47.57	+3.67
RN gain from LREM				

=== 2017 ===
Candidate	Label	First round		Second round	
Candidate	Label	Votes	%	Votes	%
Véronique Hammerer	REM	12,024	27.79	21,085	57.02
Edwige Diaz	FN	10,230	23.65	15,891	42.98
Joëlle Losson	FI	5,112	11.82		
Michelle Lacoste	PS	3,179	7.35		
Mireille Conte Jaubert	LR	2,924	6.76		
Xavier Loriaud	DVD	2,703	6.25		
Denis Baldès	DVD	1,486	3.43		
Bernard Bournazeau	DVG	1,378	3.19		
Sébastien Laborde	PCF	1,021	2.36		
Olivier Richard	ECO	927	2.14		
Caroline Goguet	ECO	750	1.73		
Georges Giacomotto	DLF	573	1.32		
François Jay	EXD	261	0.60		
Marouni Ben Hadj Salem	EXG	253	0.58		
Sabine Ligozat	DIV	229	0.53		
Laetitia Depenveiller	DIV	212	0.49		
Votes		43,262	100.00	36,976	100.00
Valid votes		43,262	97.20	36,976	90.63
Blank votes		838	1.88	2,584	6.33
Null votes		408	0.92	1,239	3.04
Turnout		44,508	47.89	40,799	43.90
Abstentions		48,433	52.11	52,141	56.10
Registered voters		92,941		92,940	
Source: Ministry of the Interior

=== 2012 ===
2012 legislative election in Gironde's 11th constituency
Candidate	Party	First round		Second round	
Candidate	Party	Votes	%	Votes	%
Philippe Plisson	PS	23,137	46.56%	29,626	64.01%
Jean-Franck Blanc	UMP	10,105	20.33%	16,655	35.99%
Pierre Dinet	FN	8,525	17.16%		
Véronique Lavaud	FG	2,518	5.07%		
Alain Montangon	MoDem	2,155	4.34%		
Michèle Bechet	EELV	1,191	2.40%		
Laurent Fouco	DLR	813	1.64%		
Yves Montaud	AEI	362	0.73%		
Nathalie Vigier	NPA	315	0.63%		
Marie Humbert	LO	279	0.56%		
Christian Baque	POI	211	0.42%		
Françoise Besset	PLD	82	0.17%		
Valid votes		49,693	98.04%	46,281	95.64%
Spoilt and null votes		996	1.96%	2,110	4.36%
Votes cast / turnout		50,689	57.49%	48,391	54.86%
Abstentions		37,482	42.51%	39,815	45.14%
Registered voters		88,171	100.00%	88,206	100.00%

=== 2007 ===
Legislative Election 2007: Gironde's 11th constituency
Party	Candidate	Votes	%	±%
PS	Philippe Plisson	17,511	34.85	
UMP	Hélène Estrade	14,213	28.28	
MoDem	Xavier Loriaud	3,693	7.35	
DVD	Jean-Jacques Edard	2,771	5.51	
FN	Christian Roche	2,399	4.77	
CPNT	Eddit Puyjalon	2,079	4.14	
Far left	Monica Casanova	1,497	2.98	
DVD	Jean-Claude Abanades	1,368	2.72	
PCF	Véronique Lavaud	1,201	2.39	
LV	Elisabeth Longchambon	1,185	2.36	
Others	N/A	2,336		
Turnout		51,477	62.02	
2nd round result
PS	Philippe Plisson	28,186	55.07	
UMP	Hélène Estrade	22,992	44.93	
Turnout		53,009	63.87	
PS hold				

=== 2002 ===
Legislative Election 2002: Gironde's 11th constituency
Party	Candidate	Votes	%	±%
PS	Bernard Madrelle	17,448	34.98	
UDF	Daniel Picotin	16,888	33.85	
FN	Christian Roche	6,177	12.38	
CPNT	Jacky Jonchere	2,600	5.21	
PCF	Denis Baldes	1,910	3.83	
LV	Jean-Pierre Verret	1,366	2.74	
Far right	Christophe Couture	1,098	2.20	
Others	N/A	2,397		
Turnout		50,950	66.93	
2nd round result
PS	Bernard Madrelle	24,157	51.50	
UDF	Daniel Picotin	22,749	48.50	
Turnout		49,029	64.41	
PS hold				

=== 1997 ===
Legislative Election 1997: Gironde's 11th constituency
Party	Candidate	Votes	%	±%
PS	Bernard Madrelle	18,830	37.82	
UDF	Daniel Picotin	15,166	30.46	
FN	Christian-Philippe Roche	6,280	12.61	
PCF	Denis Baldes	4,138	8.31	
LV	Marie-Hélène Masse	1,751	3.52	
Others	N/A	3,630		
Turnout		52,526	73.37	
2nd round result
PS	Bernard Madrelle	30,263	58.06	
UDF	Daniel Picotin	21,858	41.94	
Turnout		55,309	77.26	
PS gain from UDF				
