= Philippe Plisson =

French politician (born 1951)

Member of the National Assembly for Gironde's 11th constituency
- In office 20 June 2007 – 20 June 2017
- Preceded by: Bernard Madrelle
- Succeeded by: Véronique Hammerer

Personal details
- Born: 12 January 1951 (age 75) Saint-Caprais-de-Blaye, France
- Party: Socialist Party

Philippe Plisson (born 12 January 1951 in Saint-Caprais-de-Blaye, Gironde) was a member of the National Assembly of France. He represented the 11th constituency of the Gironde department from 2007 to 2017 as a member of the Socialist Party.
