= Bernard Madrelle =

French politician (1944–2020)

General Councillor of Gironde
- In office March 1976 – 16 March 2001
- Preceded by: Gérard Deliaune
- Succeeded by: Vincent Liminiana

Member of the French National Assembly for Gironde
- In office 3 April 1978 – 25 June 2007
- Preceded by: Gérard Deliaune
- Succeeded by: Philippe Plisson

Mayor of Saint-Seurin-de-Cursac
- In office 6 March 1983 – 12 March 1989
- Succeeded by: Nellie Pery

Mayor of Blaye
- In office 19 March 1989 – 16 March 2008
- Preceded by: Gérard Grasilier
- Succeeded by: Denis Baldès

Personal details
- Born: 27 April 1944 Saint-Seurin-de-Cursac, France
- Died: 25 September 2020 (aged 76) Blaye, France
- Party: PS

Bernard Madrelle (27 April 1944 – 25 September 2020) was a French politician. A member of the Socialist Party, he was the brother of Philippe Madrelle and the son of Jacques Madrelle, and was heavily active in the politics of Gironde.

Bernard Madrelle died of liver cancer in Blaye on 25 September 2020 at the age of 76.
