= Noyers Abbey =

Benedictine monastery in Indre-et-Loire, France

Coordinates: 47°02′07″N 00°32′55″E

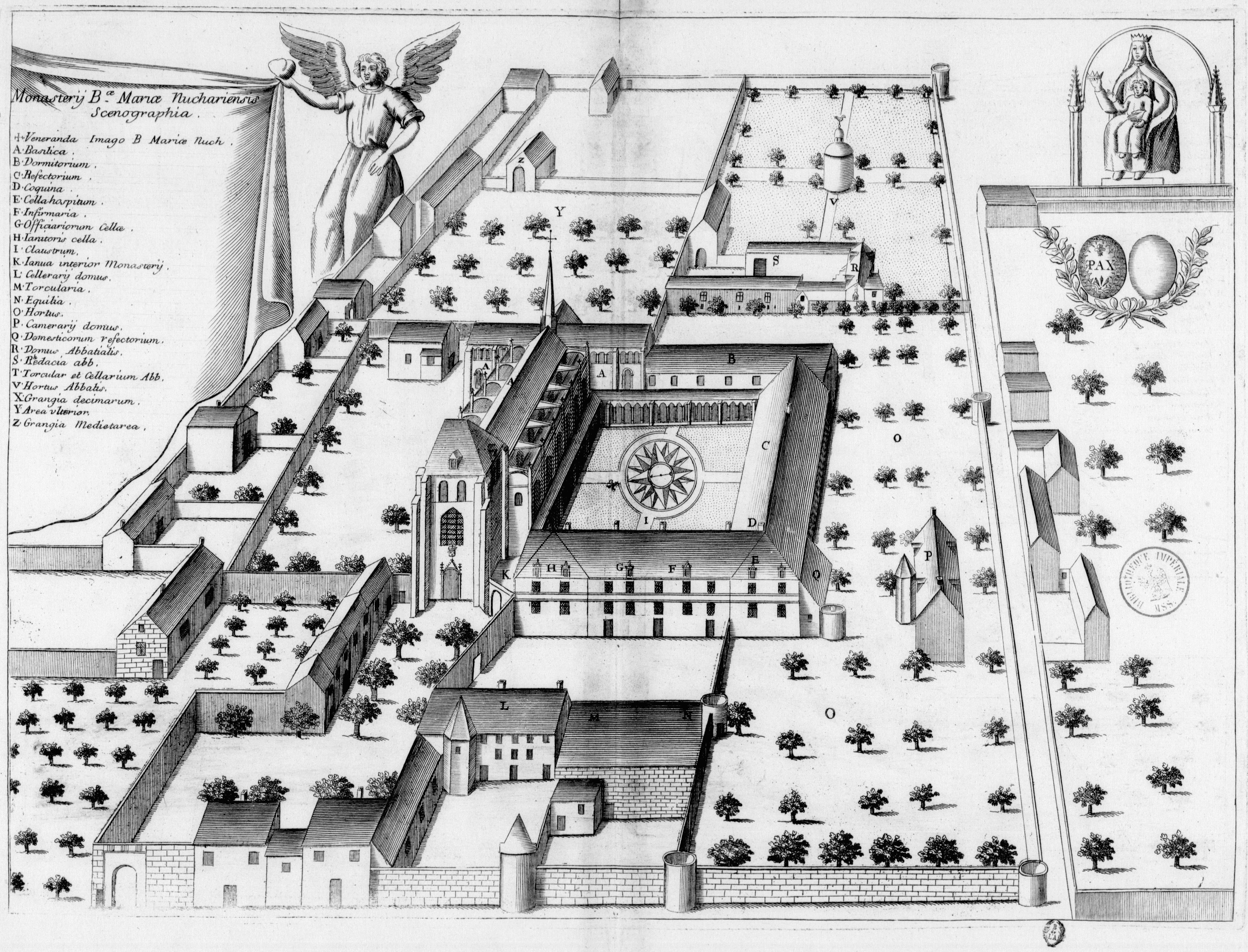
17th-century engraving of Noyers Abbey (Monasticon Gallicanum)

Noyers Abbey (French: Abbaye Notre-Dame de Noyers) is a former Benedictine monastery located in Noyers, in the territory of the commune of Nouâtre, in the department of Indre-et-Loire. It was founded in the 11th century and dissolved in 1791 during the French Revolution. It was an active centre of religious, moral, and agricultural influence in the lower Touraine and the area round Châtellerault.

== History ==
The foundation of the abbey was confirmed by Robert II of France in 1030–1031.

== Sources ==
- Abbé Casimir Chevalier, Histoire de l'Abbaye de Noyers d'après les chartes, December 1872.
