= Véronique Hammerer =

French politician (born 1968)

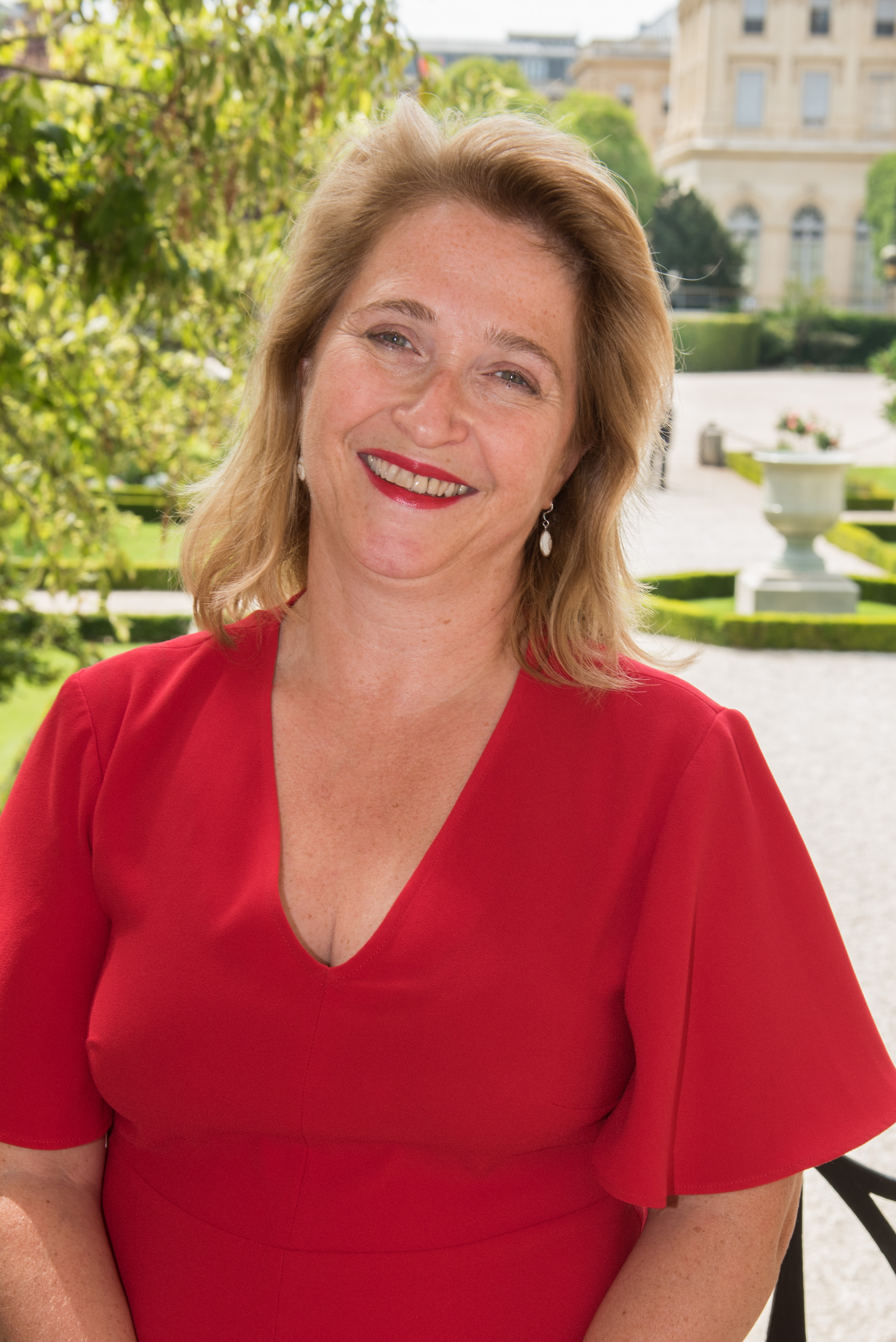
- Hammerer in 2017

Member of the National Assembly for Gironde's 11th constituency
- In office 21 June 2017 – 21 June 2022
- Preceded by: Philippe Plisson
- Succeeded by: Edwige Diaz

Personal details
- Born: 4 November 1968 (age 56); Dax, Landes, France
- Political party: Renaissance

Véronique Hammerer (born 4 November 1968) is a French politician of La République En Marche! (LREM) who has been serving as a member of the National Assembly since the 2017 elections, representing Gironde's 11th constituency until 2022.

== Early life and career ==
Hammerer was born on 4 November 1968 in Dax, Landes.

Before Hammerer became involved in politics, she was a social worker, following her husband to Africa in the 1990s. A mother of two children, she volunteered in an orphanage in Somalia during this stint. Upon returning to France, she resumed her studies, obtaining a professional license in social and socio-cultural development, and later a master's in project engineering and territorial development. She worked for the Agricultural Mutual Assistance Association (MSA) of Gironde, the Family Allowance Fund (CAF) of Bas-Rhin, and as territorial insertion official for the general council of Meurthe-et-Moselle, before being appointed director of the Intercommunal Social Action Center (CIAS) of the community of communes of Latitude Nord Gironde in Saint-Yzan-de-Soudiac in 2012.

== Political career ==
In the 2014 municipal elections, Hammerer was elected to the municipal council of Comps.

Hammerer was appointed the candidate of La République En Marche! in Gironde's 11th constituency in the 2017 legislative elections on 11 May 2017, having been inspired to support Emmanuel Macron after reading his book Révolution. In the first round of the legislative elections on 11 June, she came in first place with 27.79% of votes, advancing to the second round to face Edwige Diaz, candidate of the National Front (FN), who received 23.65% of votes cast. She was elected in the second round on 18 June with 57.02% of votes, succeeding Socialist Party (PS) deputy Philippe Plisson, who served as deputy for the constituency since 2007. She lost her re-election attempt in 2022, losing to Edwige Diaz with 41.30% of votes.

Hammerer officially took her seat on 21 June with the inauguration of the 15th legislature, joining the La République En Marche group. She has since been serving on the Committee on Economic Affairs.

== Controversy ==
In an interview published in Sud Ouest on 22 December 2017, Hammerer was questioned about omissions in her declaration of interests, the existence of which she did not deny. Unprompted, she added that it was "terrible" that her husband could not buy a Porsche Cayenne, despite the couple's love for "beautiful cars", for fear of "reflections" and public criticism from "malicious people". Responding to the comments by Hammerer and other La République En Marche deputies complaining about expenses, party leader Christophe Castaner gave a sharp rebuke, saying it was "unacceptable" for elected deputies to complain about their standard of living.
