= Noyers =

Noyers may refer to the following communes in France:

- Noyers, Eure, in the Eure département
- Noyers, Loiret, in the Loiret département
- Noyers, Haute-Marne, in the Haute-Marne département
- Noyers, Yonne, in the Yonne département
  - Canton of Noyers, one of the former cantons of the Yonne department
- Noyers-Auzécourt, in the Meuse département
- Noyers-Bocage, in the Calvados département
- Noyers-Pont-Maugis, in the Ardennes département
- Noyers-Saint-Martin, in the Oise département
- Noyers-sur-Cher, in the Loir-et-Cher département
- Noyers-sur-Jabron, in the Alpes-de-Haute-Provence département
- Noyers, Indre-et-Loir, a historic commune.

== See also ==
- Noyer, tree
