= Val-de-Livenne =

- Commune
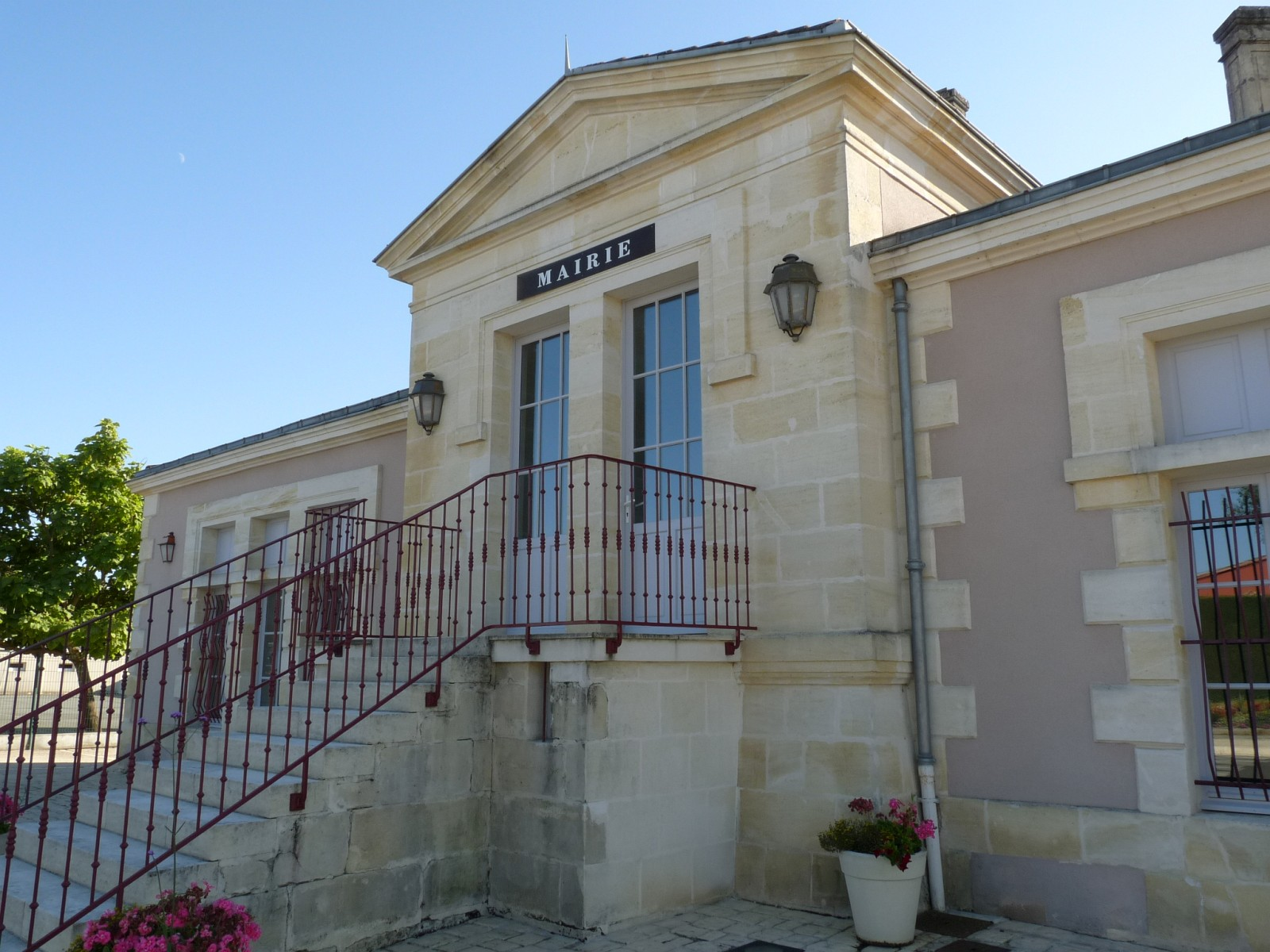
- The town hall in Saint-Caprais-de-Blaye
- Location of Val-de-Livenne
- Location within France Location within Nouvelle-Aquitaine
- Coordinates: 45°17′11″N 0°33′42″W
- Country: France
- Region: Nouvelle-Aquitaine
- Department: Gironde
- Arrondissement: Blaye
- Canton: L'Estuaire
- Intercommunality: Estuaire

Government
  - Mayor (2020–2026): Philippe Labrieux
- Area^{1}: 37.40 km^{2} (14.44 sq mi)
- Highest elevation: 82 m (269 ft)
- Lowest elevation: 7 m (23 ft)
- Population (2023): 1,792
  - Density: 47.91/km^{2} (124.1/sq mi)
- Time zone: UTC+01:00 (CET)
  - Summer (DST): UTC+02:00 (CEST)
- INSEE/Postal code: 33380 /33820, 33860
- ^{1} French Land Register data, which excludes lakes, ponds, glaciers > 1 km^{2} (0.386 sq mi or 247 acres) and river estuaries.

Val-de-Livenne (French pronunciation: [val də livɛn]; Occitan: Vallée de Livenne) is a commune in the Gironde department in Nouvelle-Aquitaine in southwestern France. It was established on 1 January 2019 by merger of the former communes of Saint-Caprais-de-Blaye (the seat) and Marcillac.

== See also ==
- Communes of the Gironde department
