= Edwige Diaz =

French politician (born 1987)

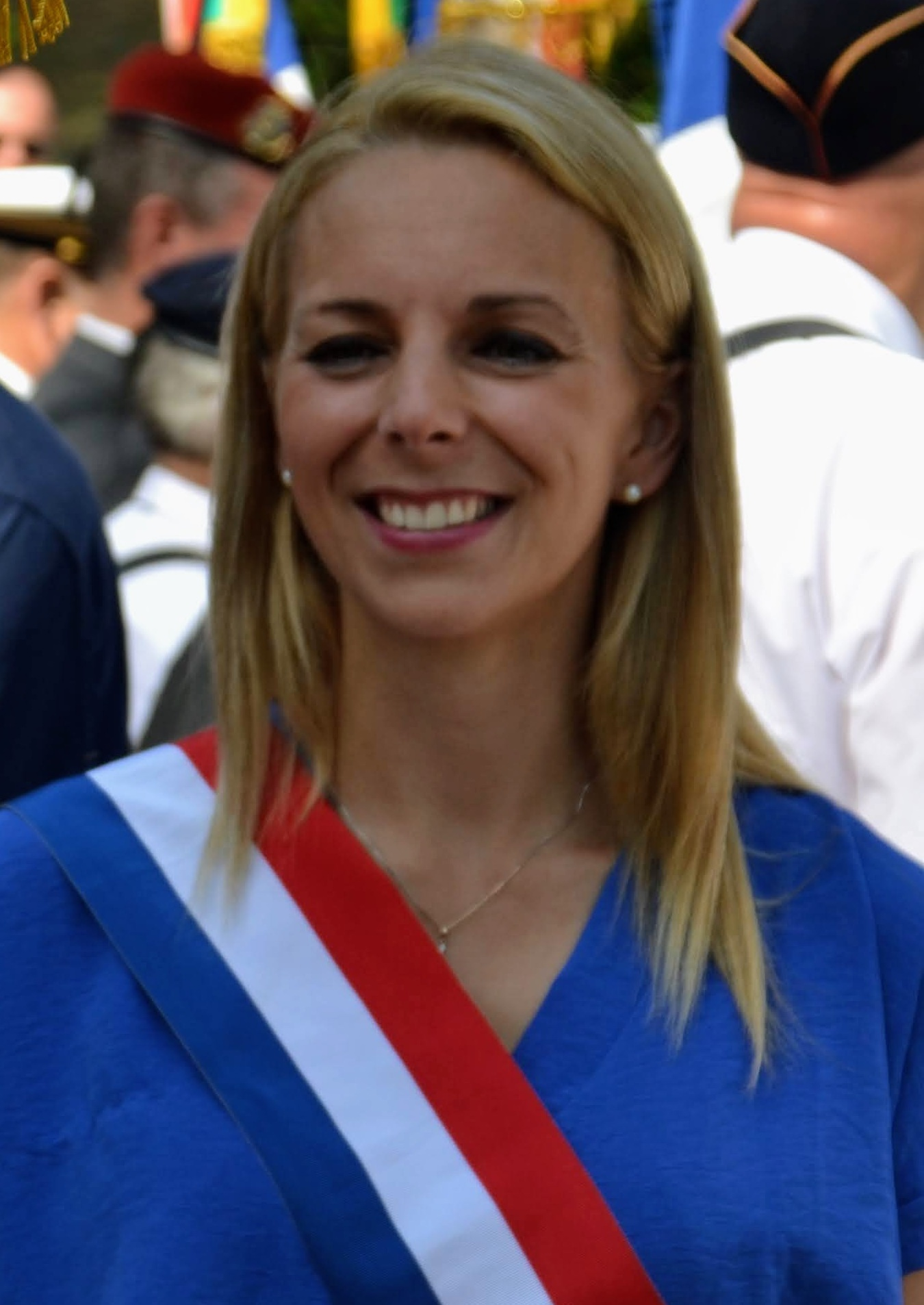
- Edwige Diaz in 2023

Senator of Gironde
- Incumbent
- Assumed office 1 October 2026

Vice president of National Rally
- Incumbent
- Assumed office 5 November 2022

Member of National Assembly for Gironde's 11th constituency
- In office 22 June 2022 – 30 September 2026
- Preceded by: Véronique Hammerer
- Succeeded by: Christine Dumas

Member of Regional Council of Nouvelle-Aquitaine
- Incumbent
- Assumed office 4 January 2016

Personal details
- Born: 15 October 1987 (age 39) Marseille, France
- Party: RN (since 2014)

Edwige Diaz (born 15 October 1987) is a French politician of the National Rally.

== Biography ==
Edwige Diaz was born on 15 October 1987. Her grandfather was a Spaniard and a communist activist. After leaving high school, Diaz studied for a Master's degree in Spanish.

Diaz was a member of the Union for a Popular Movement at college before joining the National Rally. In June 2017, as a National Rally candidate for the legislative election in the Gironde's 11th constituency (north of Bordeaux), she obtained 23.7% of votes in the first round, and then 42.98% in the second round, losing to LREM's Véronique Hammerer.

She is a regional councillor of Nouvelle-Aquitaine.

In 2020, she was a candidate in the municipal elections of Saint-Savin. She received 43.80% of the vote.

In 2021, she was the candidate of her party to lead the region of Nouvelle-Aquitaine. During the 2022 French legislative election, she was elected to the National Assembly for Gironde's 11th constituency defeating Véronique Hammerer and elected in the first round in the 2024 French legislative election.

On 27 september 2026, Edwige Diaz receives 19,63% of the big electors' votes for Senate election. Her list got 1 seat on 6 and has been elected as Senator of Gironde.
