= Sainte-Maure-de-Touraine =

- Commune
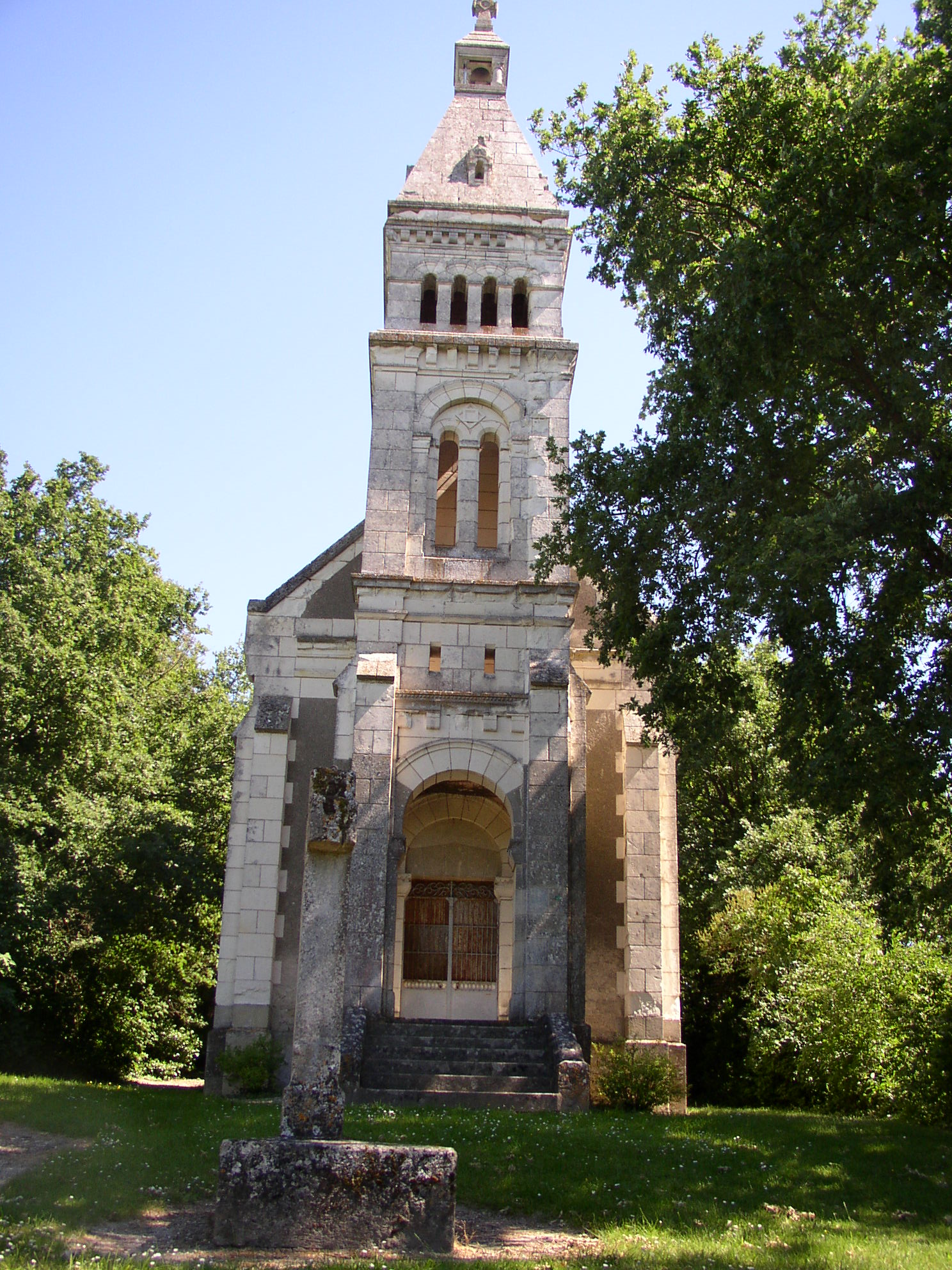
- The Chapel of the Virgin

- Coat of arms
- Location of Sainte-Maure-de-Touraine
- Location within France Location within Centre-Val de Loire
- Coordinates: 47°06′47″N 0°37′19″E
- Country: France
- Region: Centre-Val de Loire
- Department: Indre-et-Loire
- Arrondissement: Chinon
- Canton: Sainte-Maure-de-Touraine

Government
  - Mayor (2020–2026): Michel Champigny
- Area^{1}: 40.41 km^{2} (15.60 sq mi)
- Highest elevation: 122 m (400 ft)
- Lowest elevation: 58 m (190 ft)
- Population (2023): 4,092
  - Density: 101.3/km^{2} (262.3/sq mi)
- Demonym: Sainte-Maurien.ne (French)
- Time zone: UTC+01:00 (CET)
  - Summer (DST): UTC+02:00 (CEST)
- INSEE/Postal code: 37226 /37800
- ^{1} French Land Register data, which excludes lakes, ponds, glaciers > 1 km^{2} (0.386 sq mi or 247 acres) and river estuaries.

Sainte-Maure-de-Touraine (French pronunciation: [sɛ̃t mɔʁ də tuʁɛn]) is a commune in the French department of Indre-et-Loire, Centre-Val de Loire.

The name of the commune is known for its goat cheese Sainte-Maure de Touraine which was first made in the province of Touraine.

== Population ==
Historical population

Year	Pop.	±% p.a.
1793	2,230	—
1800	2,179	−0.33%
1806	2,108	−0.55%
1821	2,253	+0.44%
1831	2,259	+0.03%
1836	2,534	+2.32%
1841	2,602	+0.53%
1846	2,701	+0.75%
1851	2,744	+0.32%
1856	2,678	−0.49%
1861	2,595	−0.63%
1866	2,603	+0.06%
1872	2,409	−1.28%
1876	2,318	−0.96%
1881	2,462	+1.21%
1886	2,547	+0.68%
1891	2,602	+0.43%
1896	2,518	−0.65%
1901	2,612	+0.74%

Year	Pop.	±% p.a.
1906	2,529	−0.64%
1911	2,527	−0.02%
1921	2,355	−0.70%
1926	2,384	+0.25%
1931	2,374	−0.08%
1936	2,537	+1.34%
1946	2,743	+0.78%
1954	2,740	−0.01%
1962	3,069	+1.43%
1968	3,574	+2.57%
1975	4,016	+1.68%
1982	4,130	+0.40%
1990	3,983	−0.45%
1999	3,909	−0.21%
2007	4,007	+0.31%
2012	4,222	+1.05%
2017	4,214	−0.04%
2023	4,092	−0.49%

Source: EHESS and INSEE (1968-2023)

== See also ==
- Communes of the Indre-et-Loire department
- Sainte-Maure de Touraine, a cheese named after the commune's name
- Château de Sainte-Maure-de-Touraine
