= Sainte-Maure de Touraine =

French goat cheese

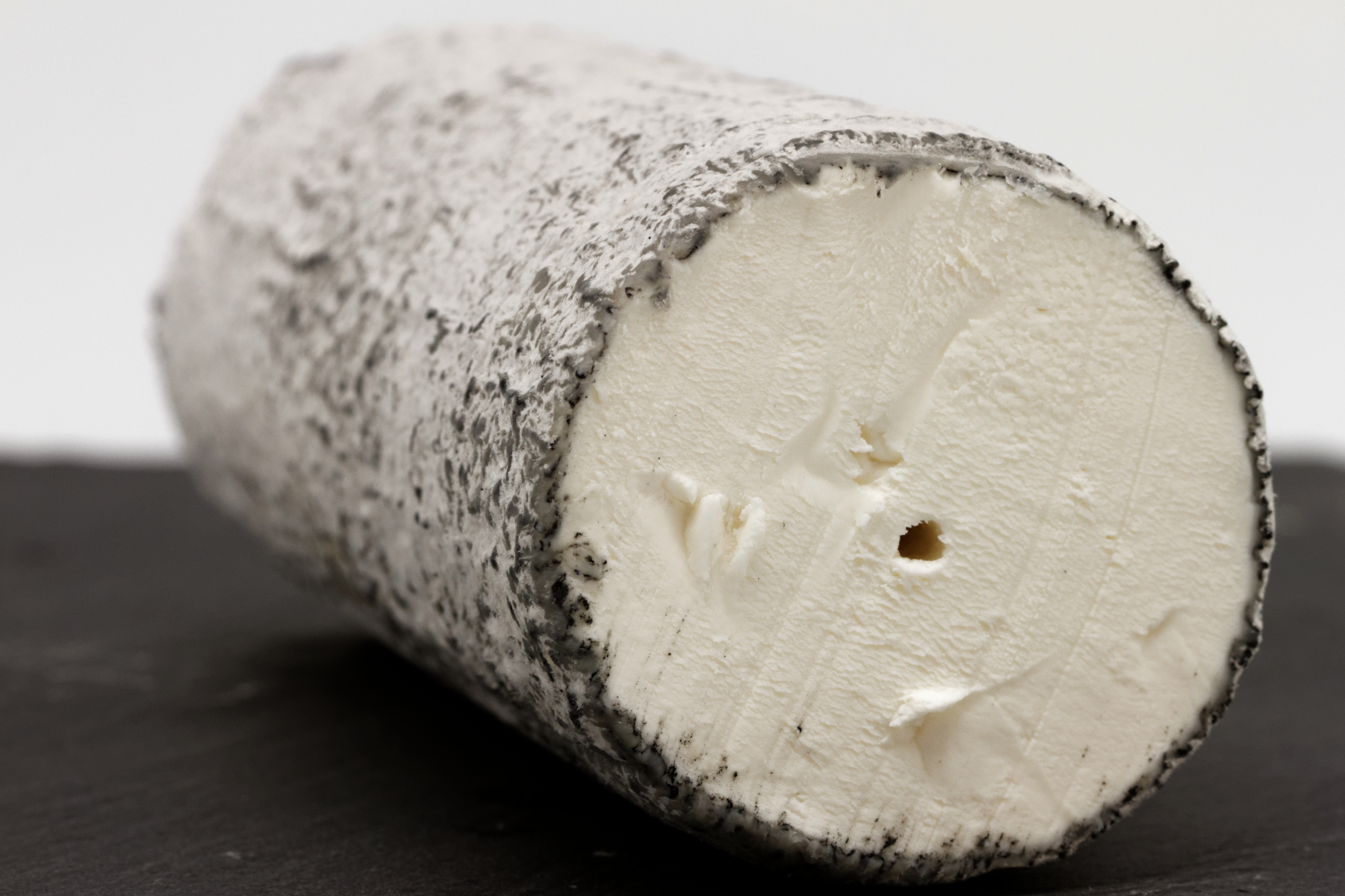
- Country of origin: France
- Region: Touraine
- Source of milk: Goat
- Pasteurised: Traditionally no
- Texture: Soft-ripened
- Aging time: at least 10 days, 10-28 days
- Certification: French AOC 1990
- Named after: Sainte-Maure-de-Touraine

Sainte-Maure de Touraine (French pronunciation: [sɛ̃t mɔʁ də tuʁɛn]) is a French cheese produced in the province of Touraine, mainly in the department of Indre-et-Loire. It is named after the small town of Sainte-Maure-de-Touraine, in the department of Indre-et-Loire, at equal distance from westerly Chinon and easterly Loches.

Sainte-Maure de Touraine is an unpasteurized cheese made from full fat goat's milk. It has the form of a small log, around 16–17 cm (6.3–6.7 in) in length, and weighs at least 250 g (8.8 oz). It is white and soft under a greyish moldy rind and is rolled in wood ash. It has a straw through its centre, marked by the AOC seal and a number indicating the producer. The straw is used, in the making, to keep the roll together. The finished cheese has 45% milk fat.

== Quality control ==
Protected since 1990 by the AOC Seal, Sainte-Maure de Touraine is made with traditional methods. It should not be confused with "Sainte-Maure", also produced in Touraine, but without meeting the stringent AOC production criteria. "Sainte-Maure" is the industrial counterpart of the high-quality, traditionally made, Sainte-Maure de Touraine. Their straw is not marked by a seal, thus differentiating them from AOC cheeses.

== Production ==
1,065 tons of Sainte-Maure de Touraine was produced in 2003, 58% on dairies and 42% on farms. Since it became an AOC in 1990, its production has strongly increased, from 275 tons (a nearly 300% increase). It is now the second-largest produced goat's cheese AOC in France, just behind Crottin de Chavignol.

== See also ==
- List of goat cheeses
