= Noyers, Indre-et-Loir =

Former commune in Loire, France

Coordinates: 47°02′07″N 0°32′50″E

Noyers is a former commune in the department of Indre-et-Loire, France, annexed in 1832 to Nouâtre. In the Middle Ages, it was home to the Benedictine Noyers Abbey.

== Demographics ==
Historical population
Year	Pop.	±% p.a.
1793	220	—
1800	223	+0.19%
1806	221	−0.15%
1821	205	−0.50%
1831	223	+0.85%
Source: EHESS
