= Saint-Seurin-de-Cursac =

- Commune
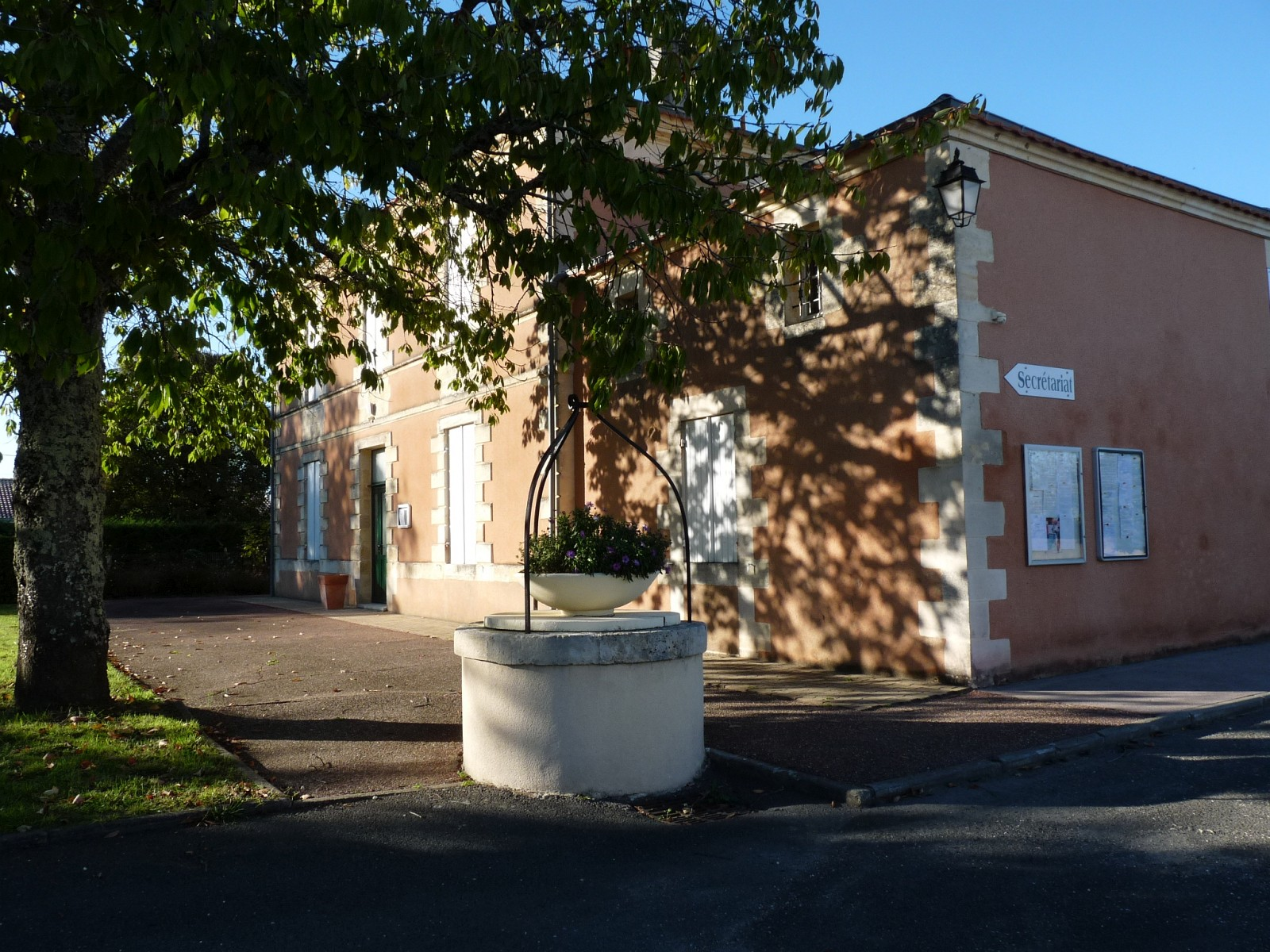
- The town hall in Saint-Seurin-de-Cursac

- Coat of arms
- Location of Saint-Seurin-de-Cursac
- Location within France Location within Nouvelle-Aquitaine
- Coordinates: 45°09′36″N 0°37′23″W
- Country: France
- Region: Nouvelle-Aquitaine
- Department: Gironde
- Arrondissement: Blaye
- Canton: L'Estuaire
- Intercommunality: l'Estuaire

Government
  - Mayor (2020–2026): Pierre Coronas
- Area^{1}: 2.36 km^{2} (0.91 sq mi)
- Elevation: 30 m (98 ft)
- Highest elevation: 46 m (151 ft)
- Lowest elevation: 17 m (56 ft)
- Population (2023): 771
  - Density: 327/km^{2} (846/sq mi)
- Time zone: UTC+01:00 (CET)
  - Summer (DST): UTC+02:00 (CEST)
- INSEE/Postal code: 33477 /33390
- ^{1} French Land Register data, which excludes lakes, ponds, glaciers > 1 km^{2} (0.386 sq mi or 247 acres) and river estuaries.

Saint-Seurin-de-Cursac (French pronunciation: [sɛ̃ sœʁɛ̃ də kyʁsak]) is a commune in the Gironde department in Nouvelle-Aquitaine in southwestern France.

== Population ==
Historical population
Year	Pop.	±% p.a.
1968	338	—
1975	335	−0.13%
1982	712	+11.37%
1990	738	+0.45%
1999	761	+0.34%
2007	737	−0.40%
2012	689	−1.34%
2017	774	+2.35%
2023	771	−0.06%
Source: INSEE

== See also ==
- Communes of the Gironde department
