= Nouâtre =

- Commune
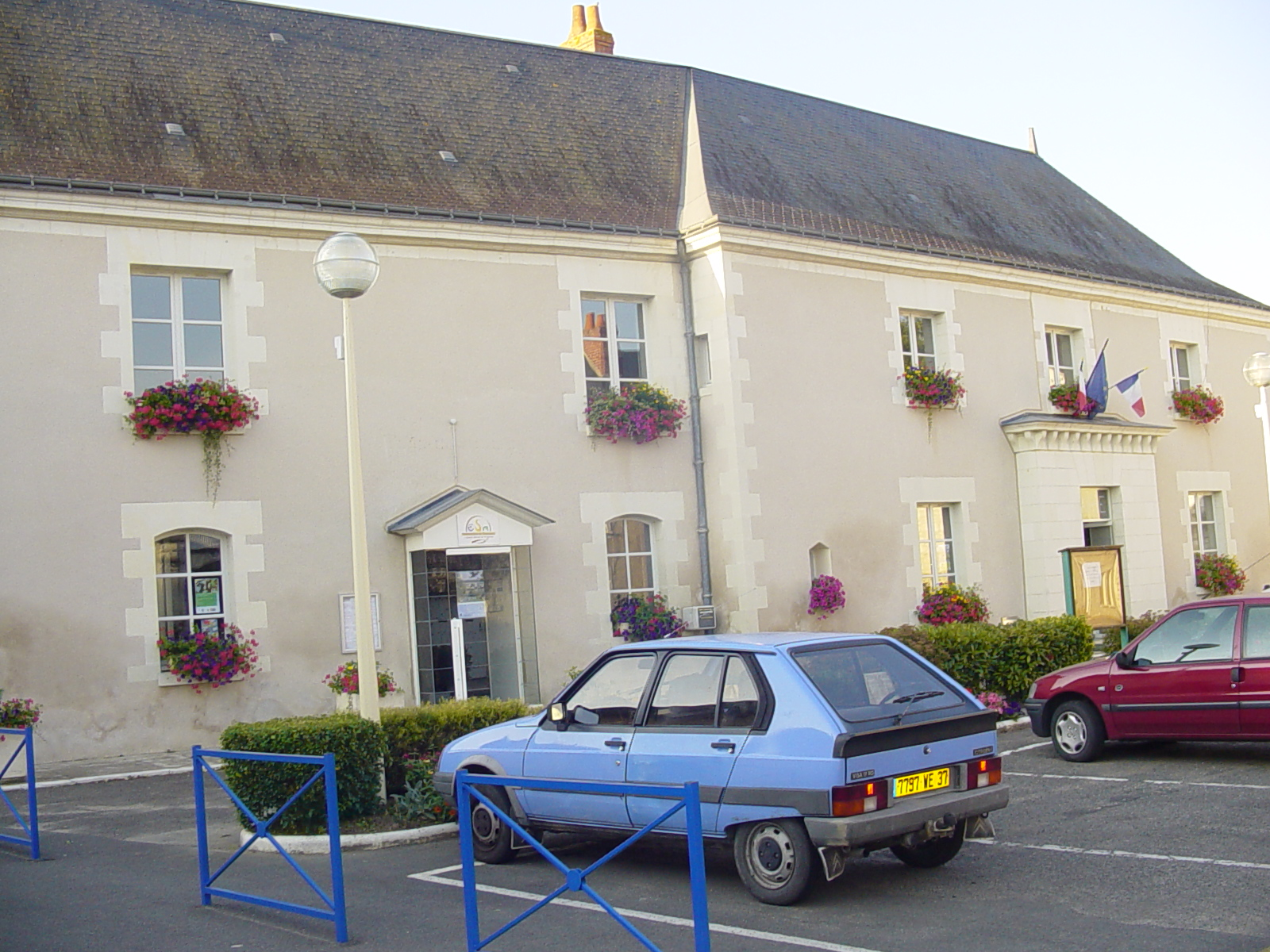
- The town hall in Nouâtre

- Coat of arms
- Location of Nouâtre
- Location within France Location within Centre-Val de Loire
- Coordinates: 47°03′09″N 0°33′09″E
- Country: France
- Region: Centre-Val de Loire
- Department: Indre-et-Loire
- Arrondissement: Chinon
- Canton: Sainte-Maure-de-Touraine

Government
  - Mayor (2023–2026): Laurent Augras
- Area^{1}: 9.65 km^{2} (3.73 sq mi)
- Highest elevation: 49 m (161 ft)
- Lowest elevation: 32 m (105 ft)
- Population (2023): 786
  - Density: 81.5/km^{2} (211/sq mi)
- Time zone: UTC+01:00 (CET)
  - Summer (DST): UTC+02:00 (CEST)
- INSEE/Postal code: 37174 /37800
- ^{1} French Land Register data, which excludes lakes, ponds, glaciers > 1 km^{2} (0.386 sq mi or 247 acres) and river estuaries.

Nouâtre (French pronunciation: [nwatʁ]) is a commune in the Indre-et-Loire department in central France. In 1832, it absorbed the historic commune of Noyers, location of the Benedictine Noyers Abbey.

== Population ==
Historical population
Year	Pop.	±% p.a.
1968	1,001	—
1975	891	−1.65%
1982	860	−0.50%
1990	833	−0.40%
1999	789	−0.60%
2007	803	+0.22%
2012	869	+1.59%
2017	823	−1.08%
2023	786	−0.76%
Source: INSEE

== See also ==
- Communes of the Indre-et-Loire department
