= Marcillac =

- Part of Val-de-Livenne
- Location of Marcillac
- Location within France Location within Nouvelle-Aquitaine
- Coordinates: 45°16′11″N 0°31′18″W
- Country: France
- Region: Nouvelle-Aquitaine
- Department: Gironde
- Arrondissement: Blaye
- Canton: L'Estuaire
- Commune: Val-de-Livenne
- Area^{1}: 32.23 km^{2} (12.44 sq mi)
- Elevation: 50 m (160 ft)
- Highest elevation: 82 m (269 ft)
- Lowest elevation: 7 m (23 ft)
- Population (2022): 1,130
  - Density: 35.1/km^{2} (90.8/sq mi)
- Time zone: UTC+01:00 (CET)
  - Summer (DST): UTC+02:00 (CEST)
- Postal code: 33860
- ^{1} French Land Register data, which excludes lakes, ponds, glaciers > 1 km^{2} (0.386 sq mi or 247 acres) and river estuaries.

Marcillac (French pronunciation: [maʁsijak]; Occitan: Marcilhac) is a former commune in the Gironde department in Nouvelle-Aquitaine in southwestern France. On 1 January 2019, it was merged into the new commune Val-de-Livenne.

== Population ==
Historical population
| Year | Pop. | ±% p.a. |
|---|---|---|
| 1962 | 1,237 | — |
| 1968 | 1,131 | −1.48% |
| 1975 | 1,061 | −0.91% |
| 1982 | 1,066 | +0.07% |
| 1990 | 1,115 | +0.56% |
| 1999 | 996 | −1.25% |
| 2006 | 1,069 | +1.02% |
| 2022 | 1,130 | +0.35% |
Source: EHESS and INSEE

== See also ==
- Communes of the Gironde department
