= Saint-Caprais-de-Blaye =

- Part of Val-de-Livenne
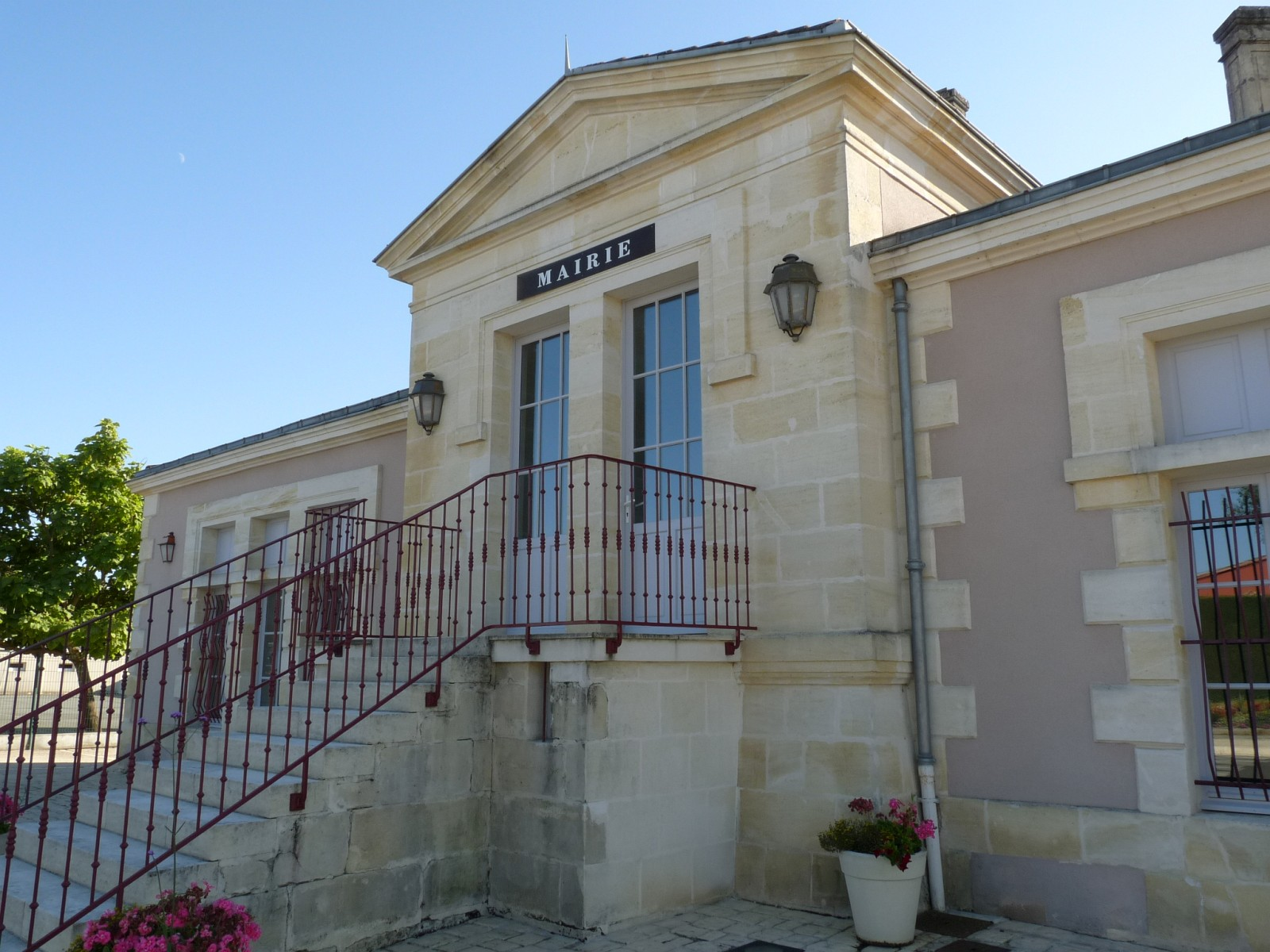
- Town hall
- Location of Saint-Caprais-de-Blaye
- Location within France Location within Nouvelle-Aquitaine
- Coordinates: 45°17′11″N 0°33′42″W
- Country: France
- Region: Nouvelle-Aquitaine
- Department: Gironde
- Arrondissement: Blaye
- Canton: L'Estuaire
- Commune: Val-de-Livenne
- Area^{1}: 5.17 km^{2} (2.00 sq mi)
- Elevation: 300 m (980 ft)
- Highest elevation: 59 m (194 ft)
- Lowest elevation: 15 m (49 ft)
- Population (2023): 667
  - Density: 129/km^{2} (334/sq mi)
- Time zone: UTC+01:00 (CET)
  - Summer (DST): UTC+02:00 (CEST)
- Postal code: 33820
- ^{1} French Land Register data, which excludes lakes, ponds, glaciers > 1 km^{2} (0.386 sq mi or 247 acres) and river estuaries.

Saint-Caprais-de-Blaye (French pronunciation: [sɛ̃ kapʁɛ də blaj], literally Saint-Caprais of Blaye) is a former commune in the Gironde department in Nouvelle-Aquitaine in southwestern France. On 1 January 2019, it was merged into the new commune Val-de-Livenne.

== See also ==
- Communes of the Gironde department
