= Landerrouet-sur-Ségur =

- Commune
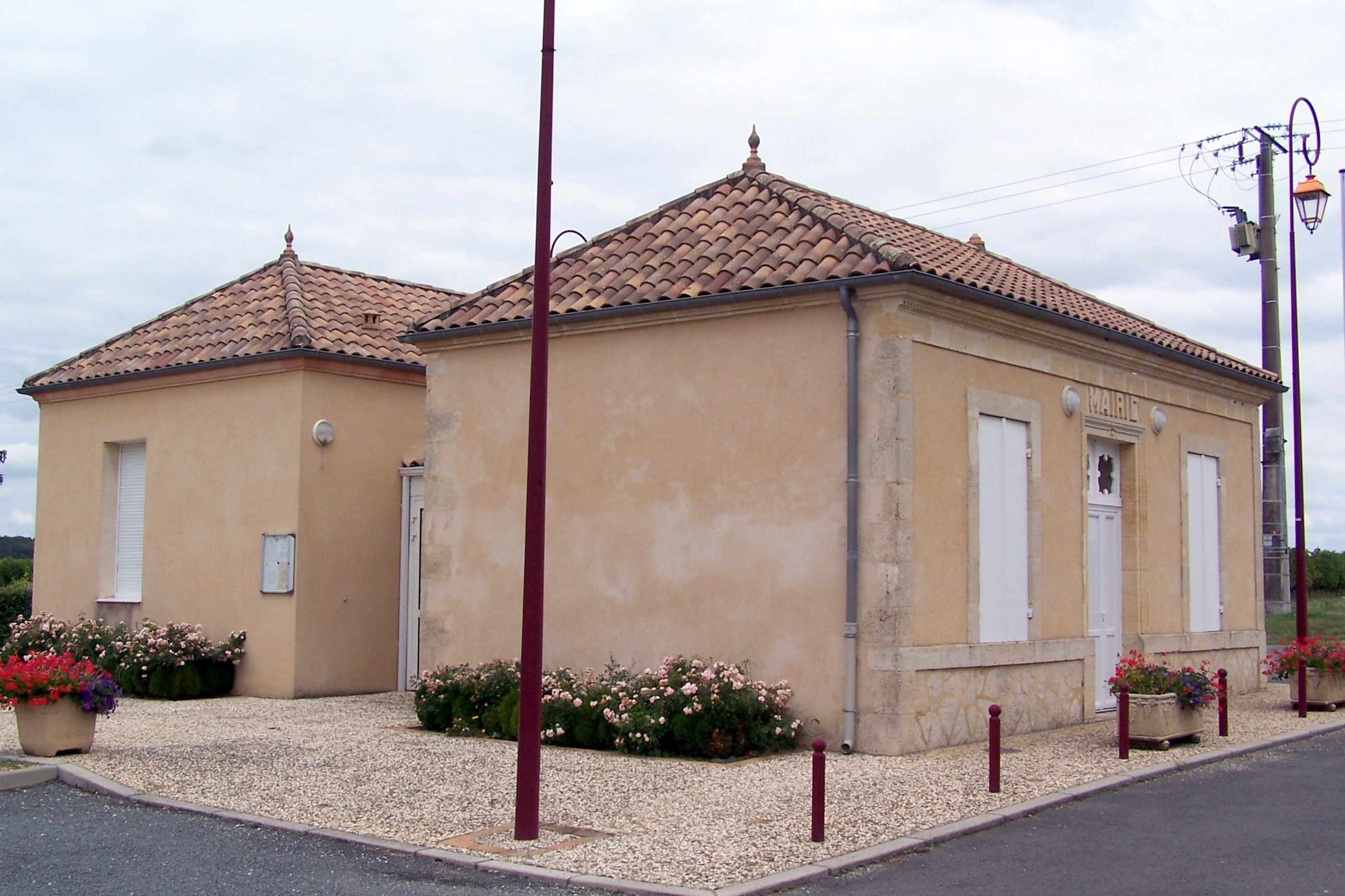
- Town hall

- Coat of arms
- Location of Landerrouet-sur-Ségur
- Location within France Location within Nouvelle-Aquitaine
- Coordinates: 44°39′15″N 0°01′18″W
- Country: France
- Region: Nouvelle-Aquitaine
- Department: Gironde
- Arrondissement: Langon
- Canton: Le Réolais et Les Bastides

Government
  - Mayor (2020–2026): Jean-Pierre Gasnault
- Area^{1}: 3.14 km^{2} (1.21 sq mi)
- Elevation: 50 m (160 ft)
- Highest elevation: 82 m (269 ft)
- Lowest elevation: 14 m (46 ft)
- Population (2023): 102
  - Density: 32.5/km^{2} (84.1/sq mi)
- Time zone: UTC+01:00 (CET)
  - Summer (DST): UTC+02:00 (CEST)
- INSEE/Postal code: 33224 /33540
- ^{1} French Land Register data, which excludes lakes, ponds, glaciers > 1 km^{2} (0.386 sq mi or 247 acres) and river estuaries.

Landerrouet-sur-Ségur is a commune in the Gironde department in Nouvelle-Aquitaine in southwestern France.

== Name ==
Landerrouet is a contraction of "landes et rhouets," a term that, in ancient times, referred to a wild region overgrown with woods and thickets; the Ségur River flows through the village.

The name of the commune is Landeroet in Gascon.

The inhabitants are called Landerrouetiens in French.

== History ==
During the French Revolution, the parish of Notre-Dame de Landerrouet became the commune of Landerrouet. On September 5, 1969, the commune of Landerrouet became Landerrouet-sur-Ségur.

Napoleon I's armies, on their way to Spain, stopped and camped there, notably at a place called Le Tertre, located in the village of Barbes, in one of the two hamlets that, along with Rival, make up the town.

The arrival of the railway during the 19th century further contributed to the growth of the entire region, and especially that of Landerrouet; a station was built there, and the building still stands.

A rich and abundant agricultural sector persisted until the 1970s, then viticulture became intensive during the 1980s, which leveled and homogenized the landscape everywhere; today, only two or three local farmers remain in Landerrouet.

== Population ==
Historical population
| Year | Pop. | ±% p.a. |
|---|---|---|
| 1968 | 115 | — |
| 1975 | 109 | −0.76% |
| 1982 | 117 | +1.02% |
| 1990 | 115 | −0.22% |
| 1999 | 108 | −0.70% |
| 2007 | 117 | +1.01% |
| 2012 | 102 | −2.71% |
| 2017 | 97 | −1.00% |
| 2023 | 102 | +0.84% |
Source: INSEE

== Culture and monuments ==
- The fortified mill called the Loubens mill spans the Dropt on the border of the communes of Loubens and Landerrouet-sur-Ségur and dates, for the most part, from the 14th century; having initially belonged to the Benedictines of the Priory of La Réole, it subsequently passed into the hands of a private miller and, now disused, is the property of a private person; it was classified as a historical monument in 2000.
- The Notre-Dame church houses a 17th century copper censer classified in 1908 as an object of historical monuments.
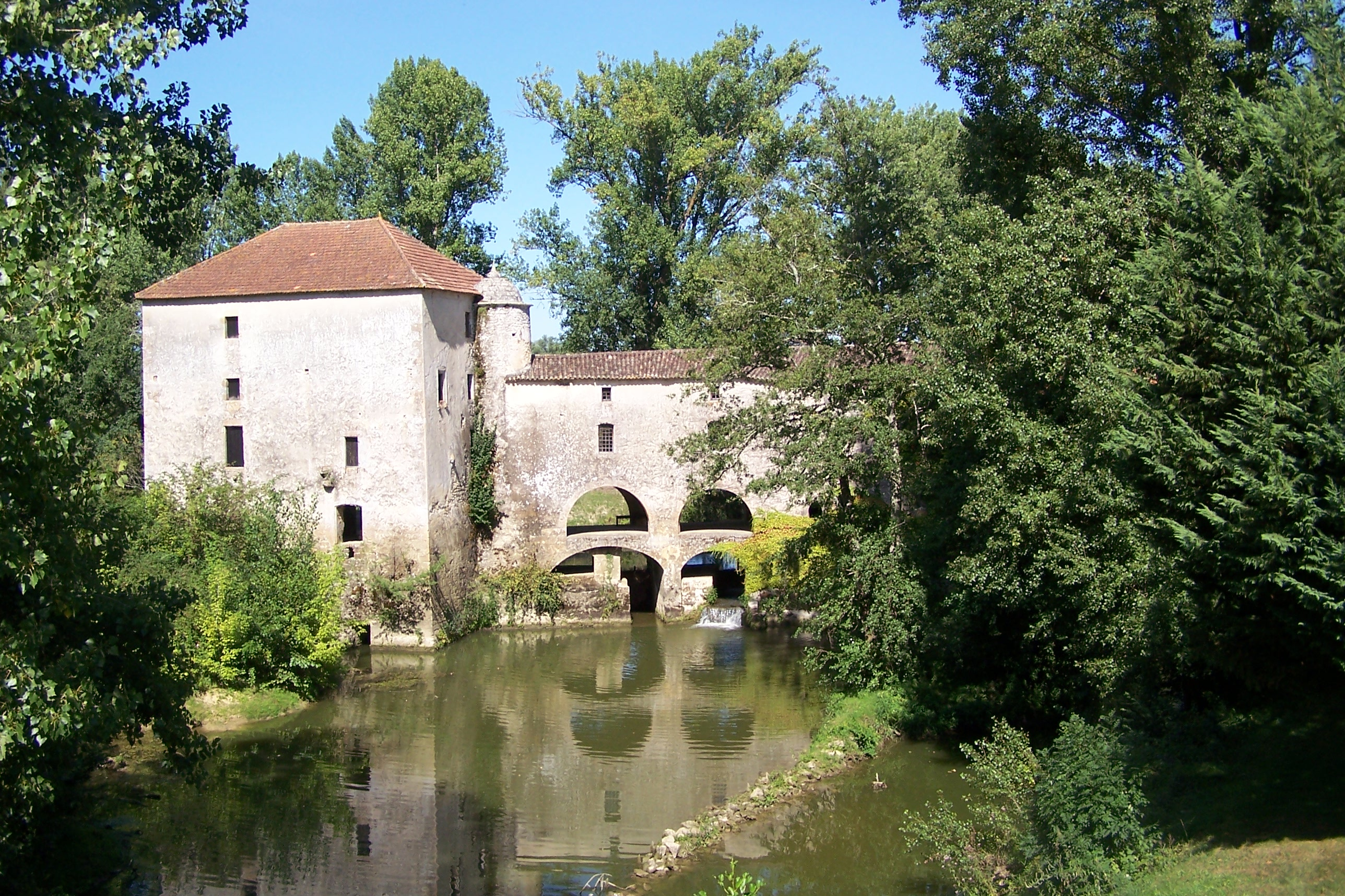
The mill on the Dropt.

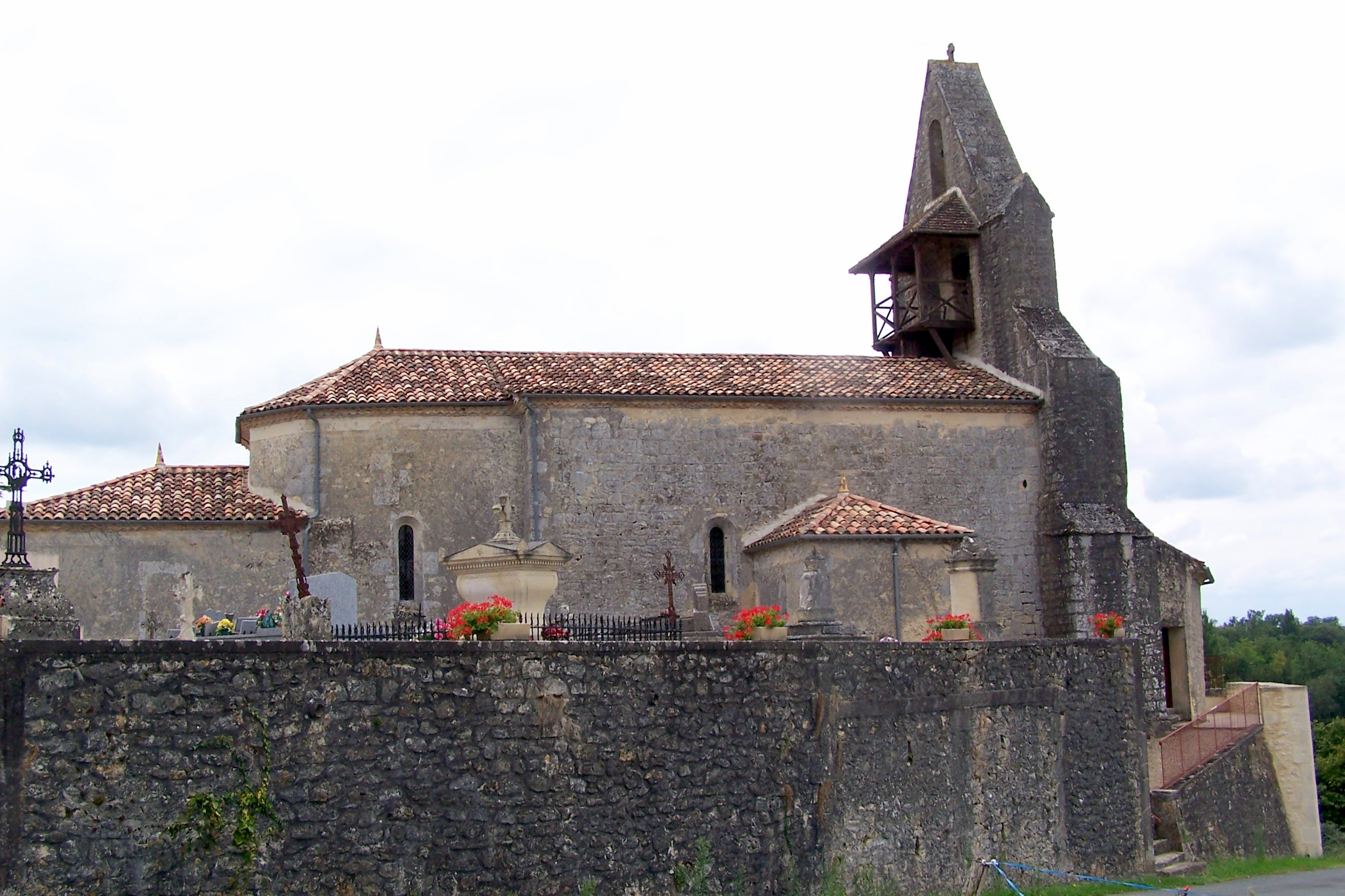
Notre-Dame Church.

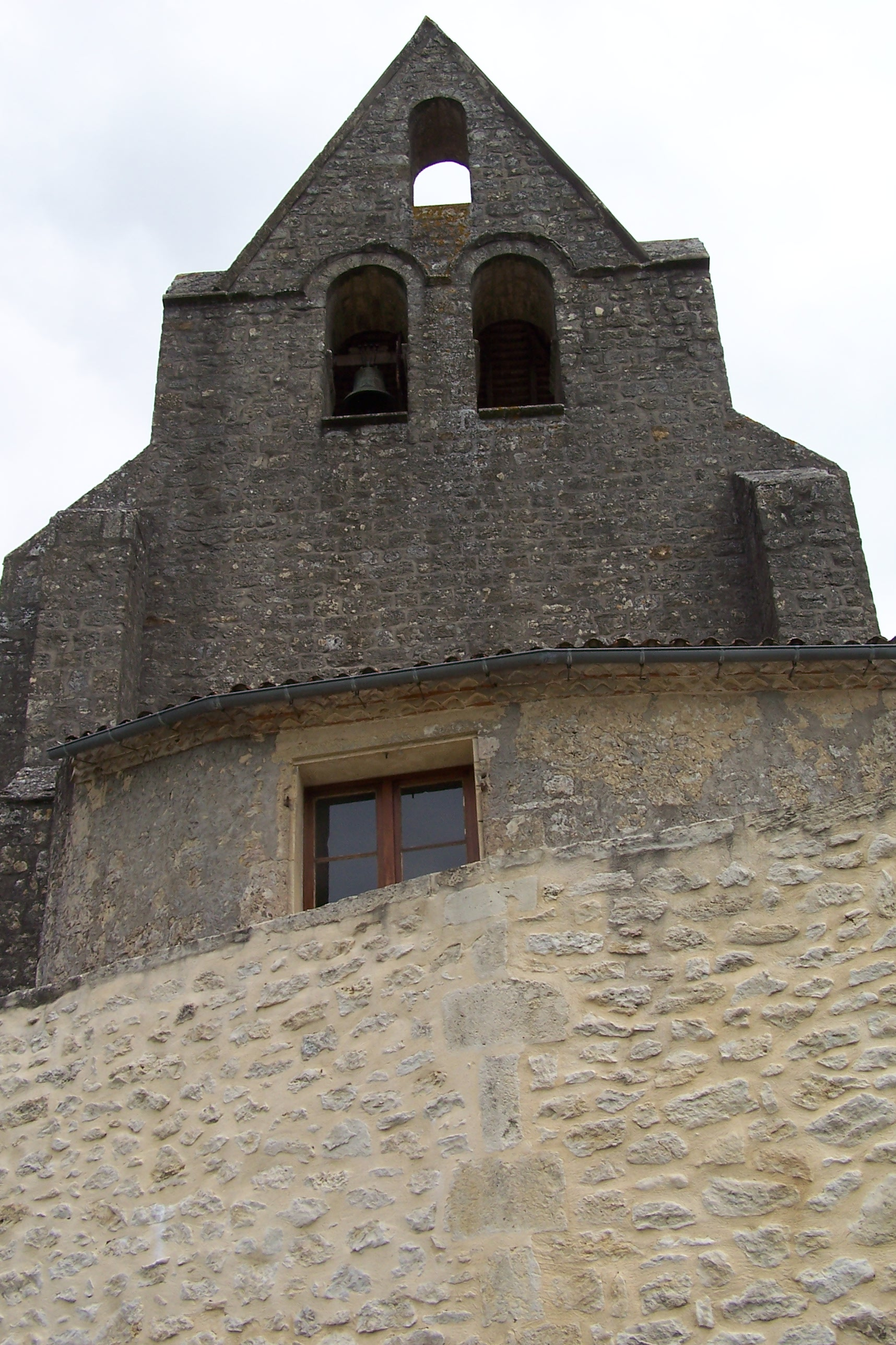
The gable-end bell tower.

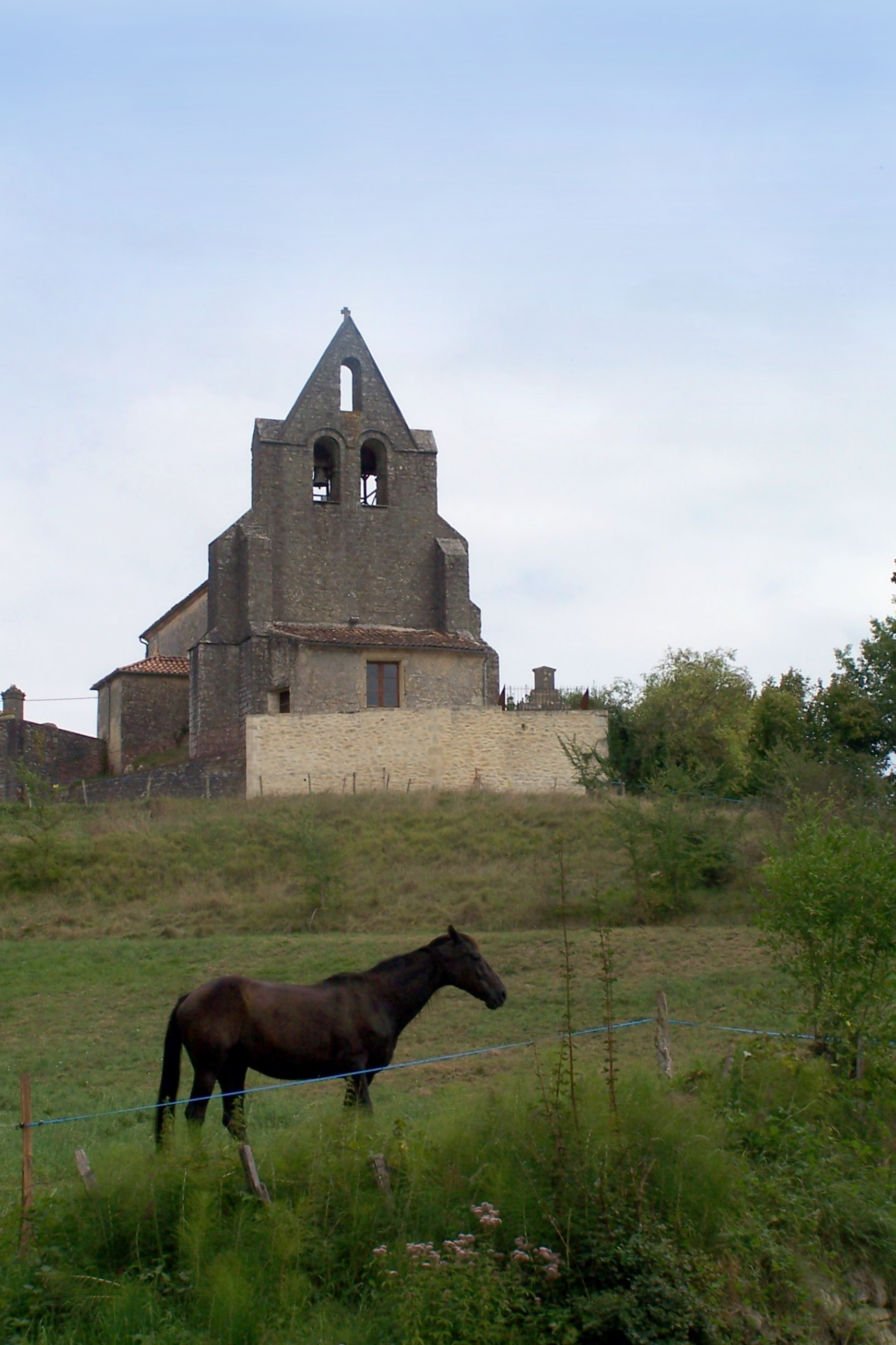
The church seen from the fields.

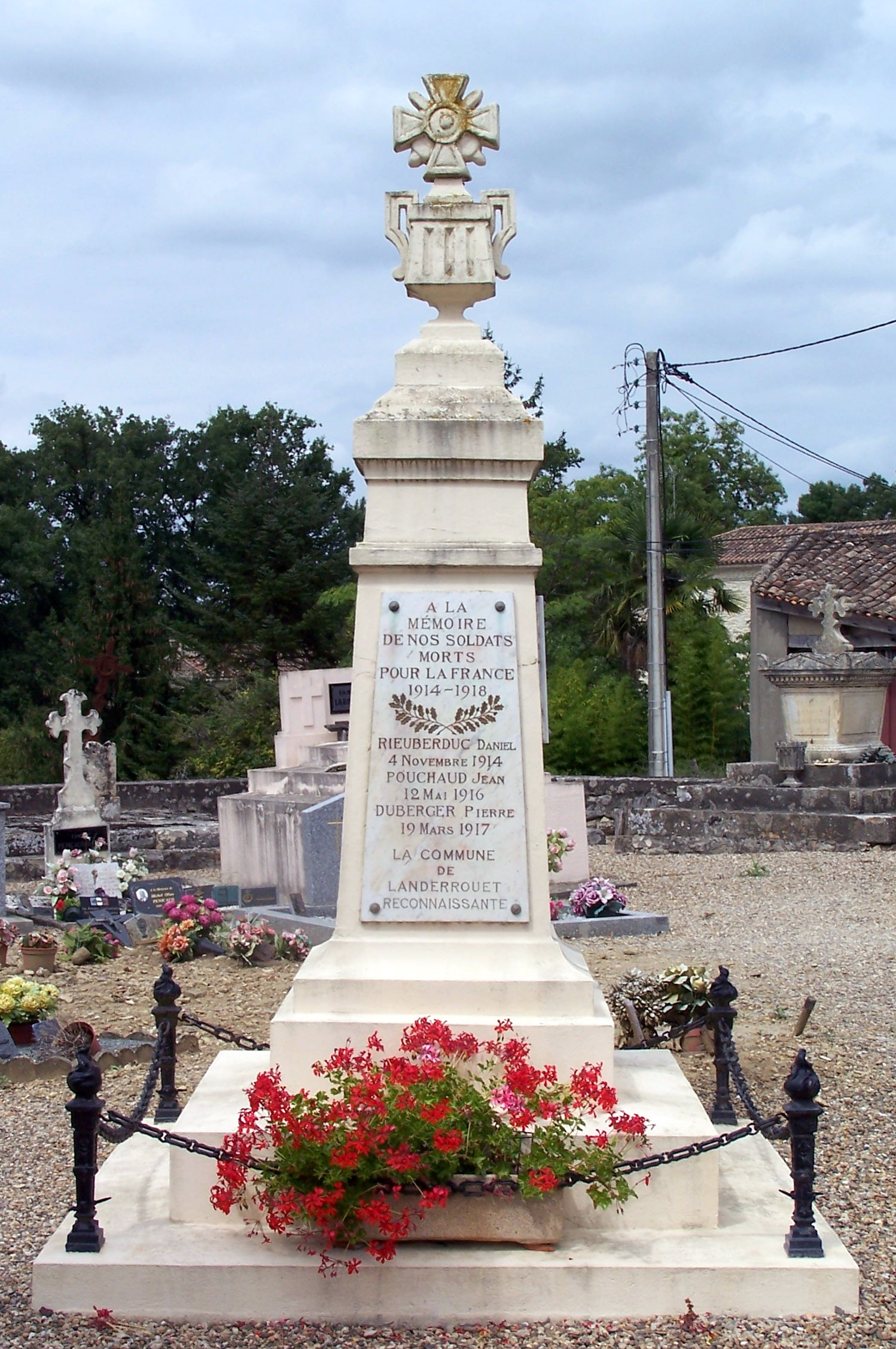
The war memorial is behind the church in the cemetery.

== Heraldry ==
| Arms of Landerrouet-sur-Ségur | Or, a lion gules; a shield folded azure charged on the dexter side with a lamb halter and contourné argent and on the sinister side with a bunch of grapes stalked and leaved of the same; all on a chief or charged with the inscriptions “LANDERROUET” and “SUR SEGUR” in capital letters sable, one above the other. Coat of arms confirmed by the town hall. |

== See also ==
- Communes of the Gironde department
