= Loubens, Gironde =

Loubens
- Commune
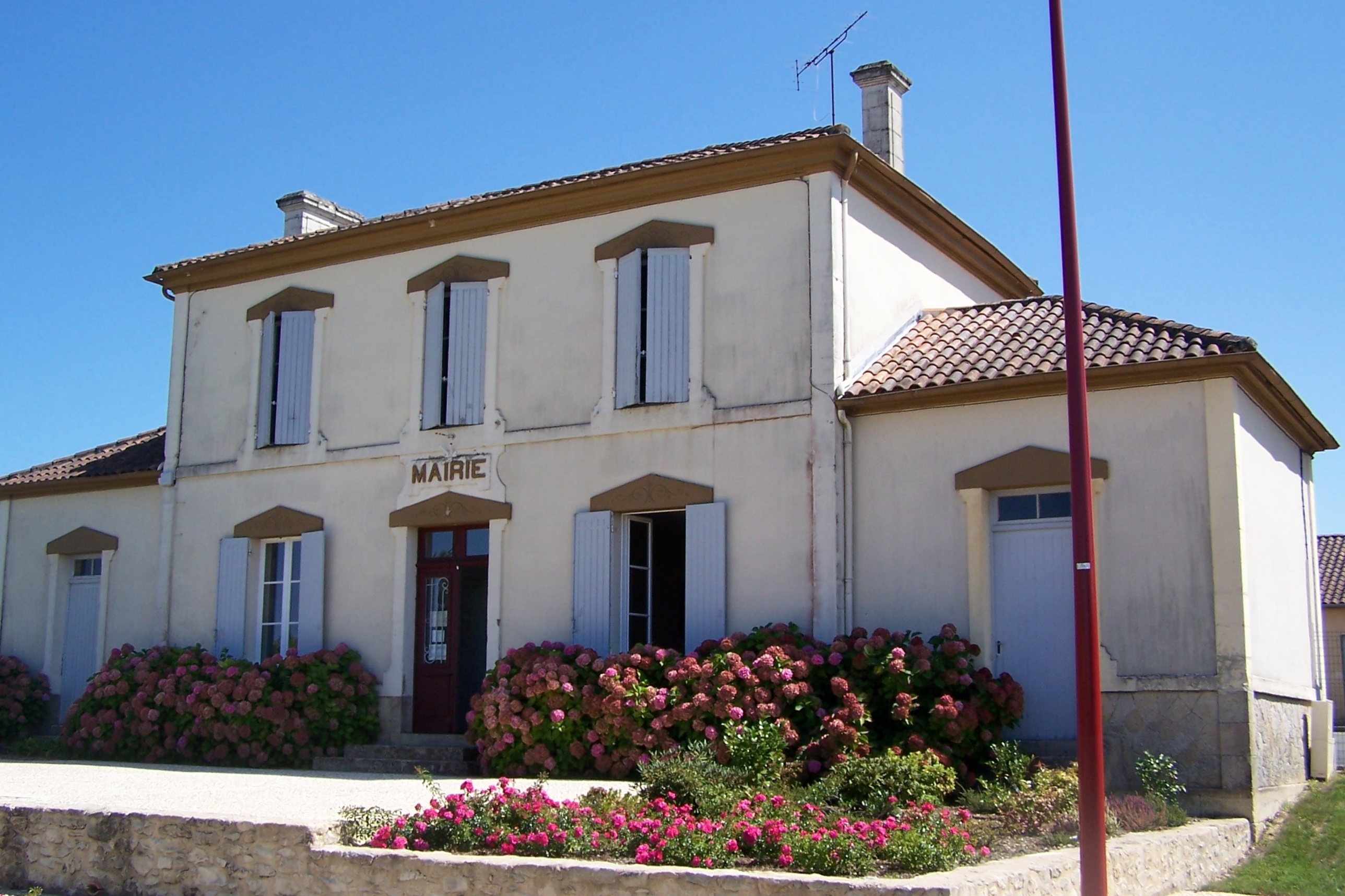
- Town hall
- Location of Loubens
- Location within France Location within Nouvelle-Aquitaine
- Coordinates: 44°37′51″N 0°02′08″W
- Country: France
- Region: Nouvelle-Aquitaine
- Department: Gironde
- Arrondissement: Langon
- Canton: Le Réolais et Les Bastides
- Intercommunality: Réolais en Sud Gironde

Government
  - Mayor (2020–2026): Alain Breuille
- Area^{1}: 5.89 km^{2} (2.27 sq mi)
- Elevation: 44 m (144 ft)
- Highest elevation: 94 m (308 ft)
- Lowest elevation: 13 m (43 ft)
- Population (2023): 316
  - Density: 53.7/km^{2} (139/sq mi)
- Time zone: UTC+01:00 (CET)
  - Summer (DST): UTC+02:00 (CEST)
- INSEE/Postal code: 33250 /33190
- ^{1} French Land Register data, which excludes lakes, ponds, glaciers > 1 km^{2} (0.386 sq mi or 247 acres) and river estuaries.

Loubens (French pronunciation: [lubɛ̃s]; Gascon: Lobens) is a commune in the Gironde department in Nouvelle-Aquitaine in southwestern France.

== Population ==
Historical population
Year	Pop.	±% p.a.
1968	245	—
1975	209	−2.24%
1982	241	+2.06%
1990	315	+3.40%
1999	311	−0.14%
2007	302	−0.37%
2012	306	+0.26%
2017	301	−0.33%
2023	316	+0.81%
Source: INSEE

== See also ==
- Communes of the Gironde department
