= Saint-Quentin-de-Baron =

- Commune
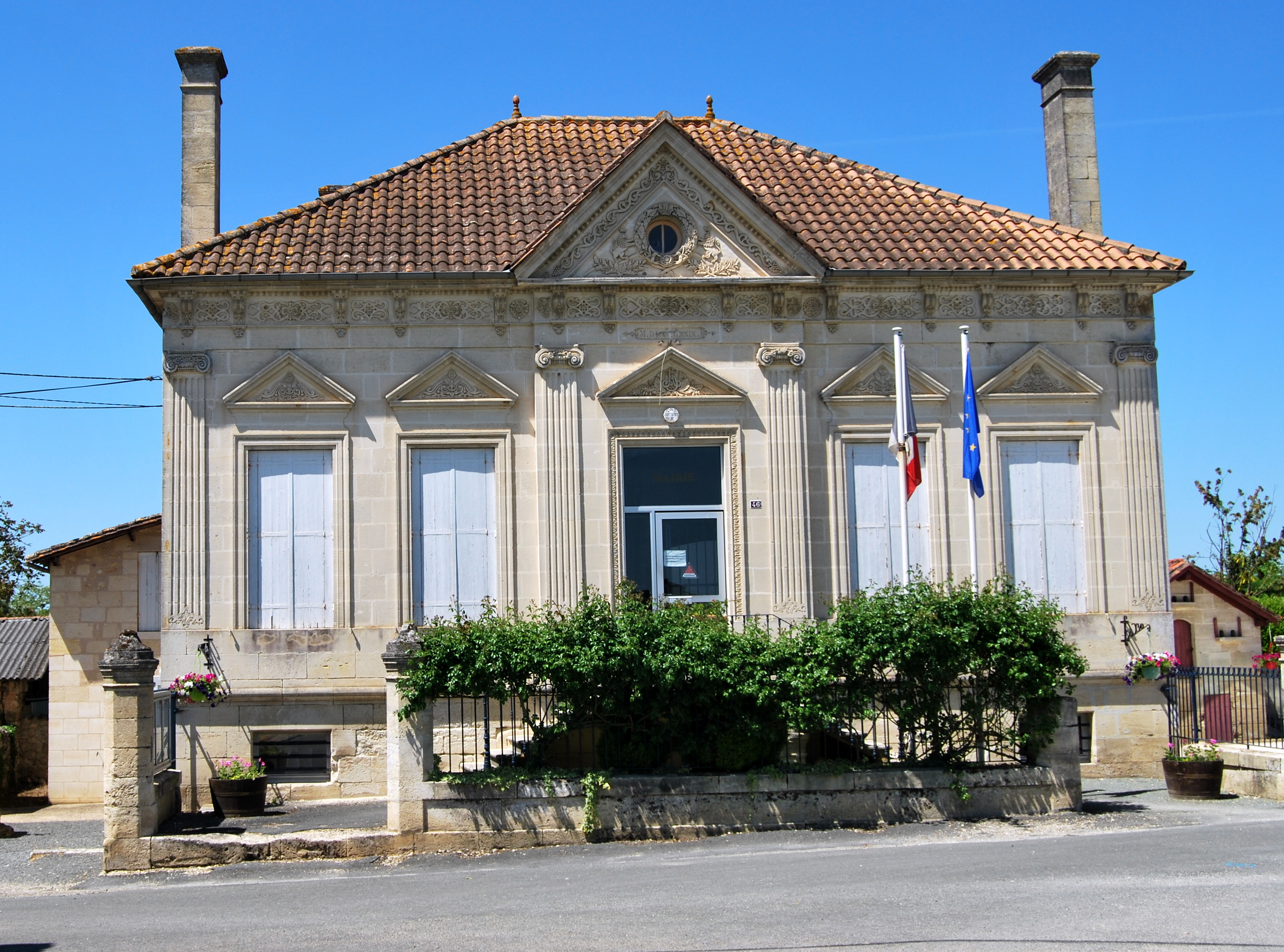
- The town hall in Saint-Quentin-de-Baron

- Coat of arms
- Location of Saint-Quentin-de-Baron
- Location within France Location within Nouvelle-Aquitaine
- Coordinates: 44°49′06″N 0°17′09″W
- Country: France
- Region: Nouvelle-Aquitaine
- Department: Gironde
- Arrondissement: Libourne
- Canton: Les Coteaux de Dordogne
- Intercommunality: CA Libournais

Government
  - Mayor (2020–2026): Stéphanie Dupuy
- Area^{1}: 8.69 km^{2} (3.36 sq mi)
- Elevation: 62 m (203 ft)
- Highest elevation: 80 m (260 ft)
- Lowest elevation: 10 m (33 ft)
- Population (2023): 2,713
  - Density: 312/km^{2} (809/sq mi)
- Time zone: UTC+01:00 (CET)
  - Summer (DST): UTC+02:00 (CEST)
- INSEE/Postal code: 33466 /33750
- ^{1} French Land Register data, which excludes lakes, ponds, glaciers > 1 km^{2} (0.386 sq mi or 247 acres) and river estuaries.

Saint-Quentin-de-Baron (French pronunciation: [sɛ̃ kɑ̃tɛ̃ də baʁɔ̃], literally Saint-Quentin of Baron; Occitan: Sent Quentin de Baron) is a commune in the Gironde department in Nouvelle-Aquitaine in southwestern France.

== Population ==
Historical population
Year	Pop.	±% p.a.
1968	730	—
1975	723	−0.14%
1982	853	+2.39%
1990	947	+1.32%
1999	958	+0.13%
2007	1,347	+4.35%
2012	2,000	+8.23%
2017	2,442	+4.07%
2023	2,713	+1.77%
Source: INSEE

== See also ==
- Communes of the Gironde department
