= Les Salles-de-Castillon =

- Commune
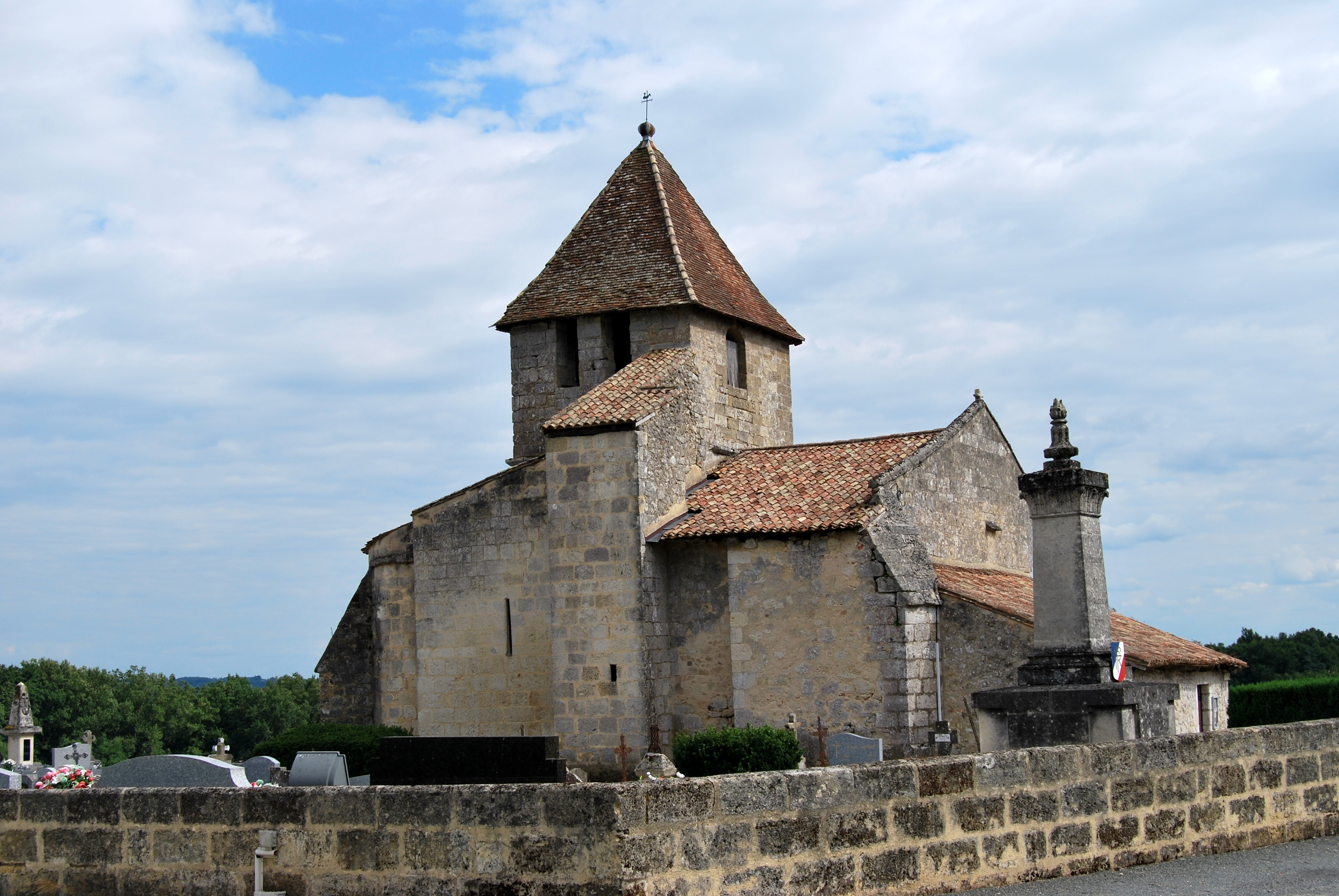
- The church in Les Salles-de-Castillon
- Location of Les Salles-de-Castillon
- Location within France Location within Nouvelle-Aquitaine
- Coordinates: 44°54′46″N 0°00′01″W
- Country: France
- Region: Nouvelle-Aquitaine
- Department: Gironde
- Arrondissement: Libourne
- Canton: Les Coteaux de Dordogne

Government
  - Mayor (2020–2026): Marie-Claude Lavignac
- Area^{1}: 10.81 km^{2} (4.17 sq mi)
- Elevation: 82 m (269 ft)
- Highest elevation: 100 m (330 ft)
- Lowest elevation: 18 m (59 ft)
- Population (2023): 330
  - Density: 31/km^{2} (79/sq mi)
- Time zone: UTC+01:00 (CET)
  - Summer (DST): UTC+02:00 (CEST)
- INSEE/Postal code: 33499 /33350
- ^{1} French Land Register data, which excludes lakes, ponds, glaciers > 1 km^{2} (0.386 sq mi or 247 acres) and river estuaries.

Les Salles-de-Castillon (French pronunciation: [le sal də kastijɔ̃]; Occitan: Las Salas de Castilhon) is a commune in the Gironde department in Nouvelle-Aquitaine in southwestern France.

== Population ==
Historical population
Year	Pop.	±% p.a.
1968	334	—
1975	270	−2.99%
1982	283	+0.67%
1990	324	+1.71%
1999	369	+1.46%
2007	357	−0.41%
2012	392	+1.89%
2017	363	−1.53%
2023	330	−1.58%
Source: INSEE

== See also ==
- Communes of the Gironde department
