= Pessac-sur-Dordogne =

- Commune
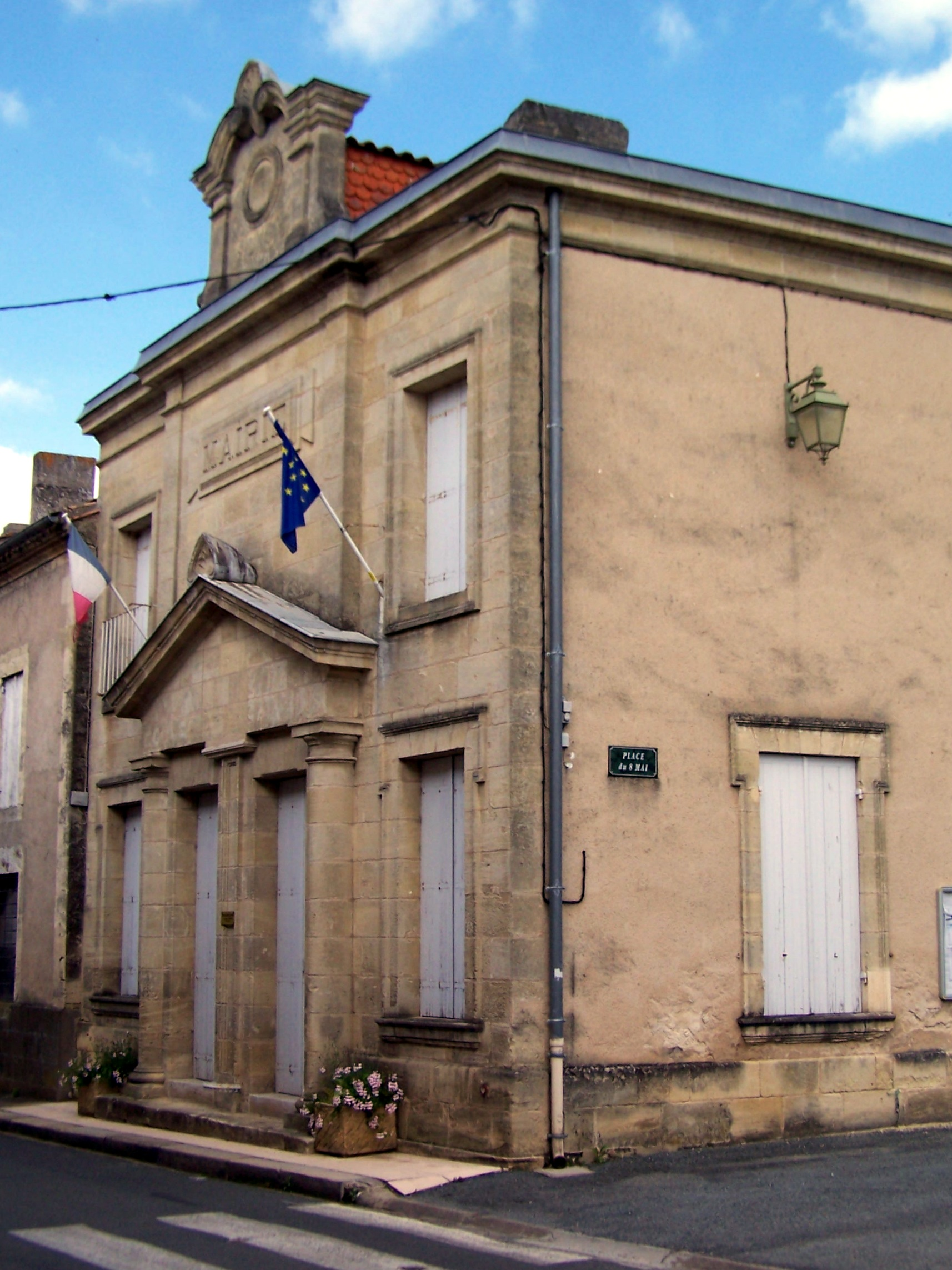
- The town hall in Pessac-sur-Dordogne

- Coat of arms
- Location of Pessac-sur-Dordogne
- Location within France Location within Nouvelle-Aquitaine
- Coordinates: 44°49′18″N 0°04′46″E
- Country: France
- Region: Nouvelle-Aquitaine
- Department: Gironde
- Arrondissement: Libourne
- Canton: Les Coteaux de Dordogne
- Intercommunality: Castillon-Pujols

Government
  - Mayor (2020–2026): Bernard Dudon
- Area^{1}: 7.78 km^{2} (3.00 sq mi)
- Elevation: 16 m (52 ft)
- Highest elevation: 106 m (348 ft)
- Lowest elevation: 3 m (9.8 ft)
- Population (2023): 448
  - Density: 57.6/km^{2} (149/sq mi)
- Time zone: UTC+01:00 (CET)
  - Summer (DST): UTC+02:00 (CEST)
- INSEE/Postal code: 33319 /33890
- ^{1} French Land Register data, which excludes lakes, ponds, glaciers > 1 km^{2} (0.386 sq mi or 247 acres) and river estuaries.

Pessac-sur-Dordogne (French pronunciation: [pɛsak syʁ dɔʁdɔɲ], literally Pessac on Dordogne; Occitan: Peçac de Dordonha) is a commune in the Gironde department in Nouvelle-Aquitaine in southwestern France.

== Population ==
Historical population
Year	Pop.	±% p.a.
1968	576	—
1975	534	−1.08%
1982	490	−1.22%
1990	471	−0.49%
1999	463	−0.19%
2007	469	+0.16%
2012	484	+0.63%
2017	449	−1.49%
2023	448	−0.04%
Source: INSEE

== See also ==
- Communes of the Gironde department
