= Gardegan-et-Tourtirac =

- Commune
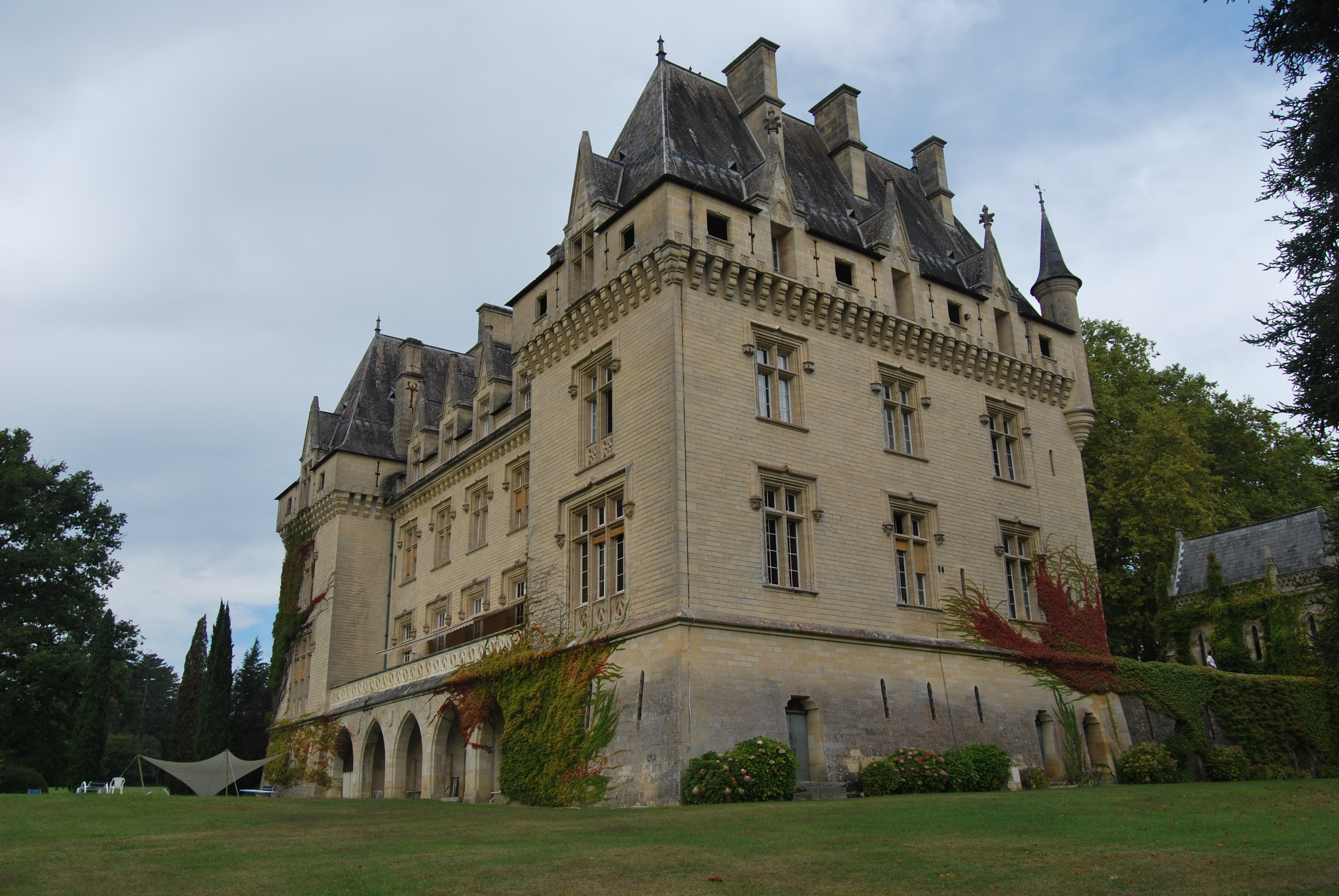
- The chateau of Pitray in Gardegan-et-Tourtirac
- Location of Gardegan-et-Tourtirac
- Location within France Location within Nouvelle-Aquitaine
- Coordinates: 44°54′04″N 0°01′14″W
- Country: France
- Region: Nouvelle-Aquitaine
- Department: Gironde
- Arrondissement: Libourne
- Canton: Les Coteaux de Dordogne

Government
  - Mayor (2020–2026): Patrick Bigot
- Area^{1}: 9.58 km^{2} (3.70 sq mi)
- Highest elevation: 107 m (351 ft)
- Lowest elevation: 12 m (39 ft)
- Population (2023): 274
  - Density: 28.6/km^{2} (74.1/sq mi)
- Time zone: UTC+01:00 (CET)
  - Summer (DST): UTC+02:00 (CEST)
- INSEE/Postal code: 33181 /33350
- ^{1} French Land Register data, which excludes lakes, ponds, glaciers > 1 km^{2} (0.386 sq mi or 247 acres) and river estuaries.

Gardegan-et-Tourtirac (French pronunciation: [ɡaʁdəɡɑ̃ e tuʁtiʁak]; Occitan: Gardegan e Tortirac) is a commune in the Gironde department in southwestern France.

== Population ==
Historical population
| Year | Pop. | ±% p.a. |
|---|---|---|
| 1968 | 262 | — |
| 1975 | 217 | −2.66% |
| 1982 | 240 | +1.45% |
| 1990 | 295 | +2.61% |
| 1999 | 282 | −0.50% |
| 2007 | 303 | +0.90% |
| 2012 | 308 | +0.33% |
| 2017 | 281 | −1.82% |
| 2023 | 274 | −0.42% |
Source: INSEE

== See also ==
- Communes of the Gironde department
