= Saint-Jean-de-Blaignac =

- Commune
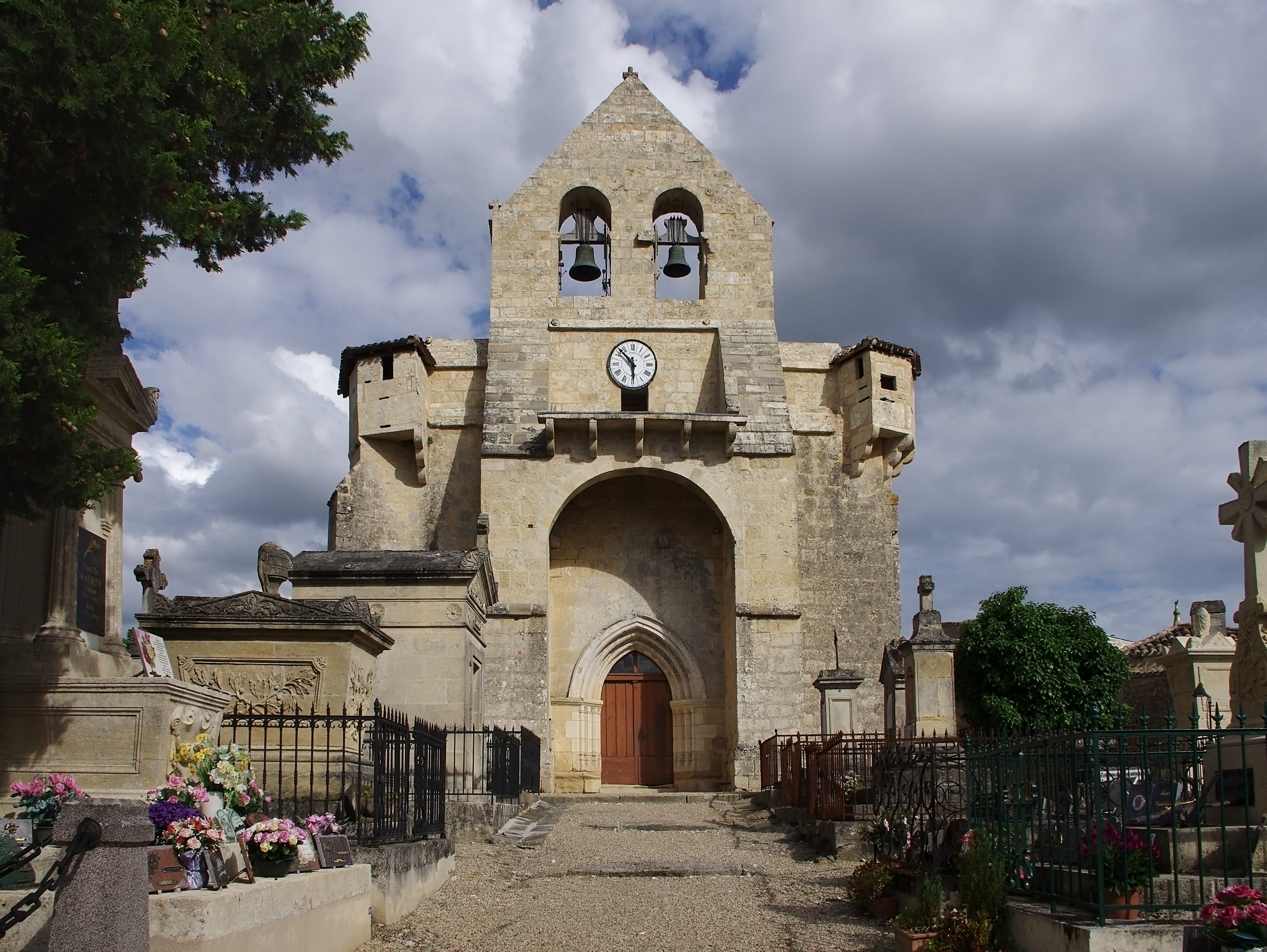
- The church in Saint-Jean-de-Blaignac
- Location of Saint-Jean-de-Blaignac
- Location within France Location within Nouvelle-Aquitaine
- Coordinates: 44°48′50″N 0°08′19″W
- Country: France
- Region: Nouvelle-Aquitaine
- Department: Gironde
- Arrondissement: Libourne
- Canton: Les Coteaux de Dordogne
- Intercommunality: Castillon Pujols

Government
  - Mayor (2020–2026): Bernard Gauthier
- Area^{1}: 5.58 km^{2} (2.15 sq mi)
- Elevation: 72 m (236 ft)
- Highest elevation: 93 m (305 ft)
- Lowest elevation: 3 m (9.8 ft)
- Population (2023): 445
  - Density: 79.7/km^{2} (207/sq mi)
- Time zone: UTC+01:00 (CET)
  - Summer (DST): UTC+02:00 (CEST)
- INSEE/Postal code: 33421 /33420
- ^{1} French Land Register data, which excludes lakes, ponds, glaciers > 1 km^{2} (0.386 sq mi or 247 acres) and river estuaries.

Saint-Jean-de-Blaignac (French pronunciation: [sɛ̃ ʒɑ̃ də blɛɲak]; Languedocien: Sent Joan de Blanhac) is a commune in the Gironde department in Nouvelle-Aquitaine in southwestern France.

== Population ==
Historical population
Year	Pop.	±% p.a.
1968	354	—
1975	341	−0.53%
1982	378	+1.48%
1990	405	+0.87%
1999	401	−0.11%
2007	373	−0.90%
2012	432	+2.98%
2017	440	+0.37%
2023	445	+0.19%
Source: INSEE

== See also ==
- Communes of the Gironde department
