= Civrac-sur-Dordogne =

- Commune
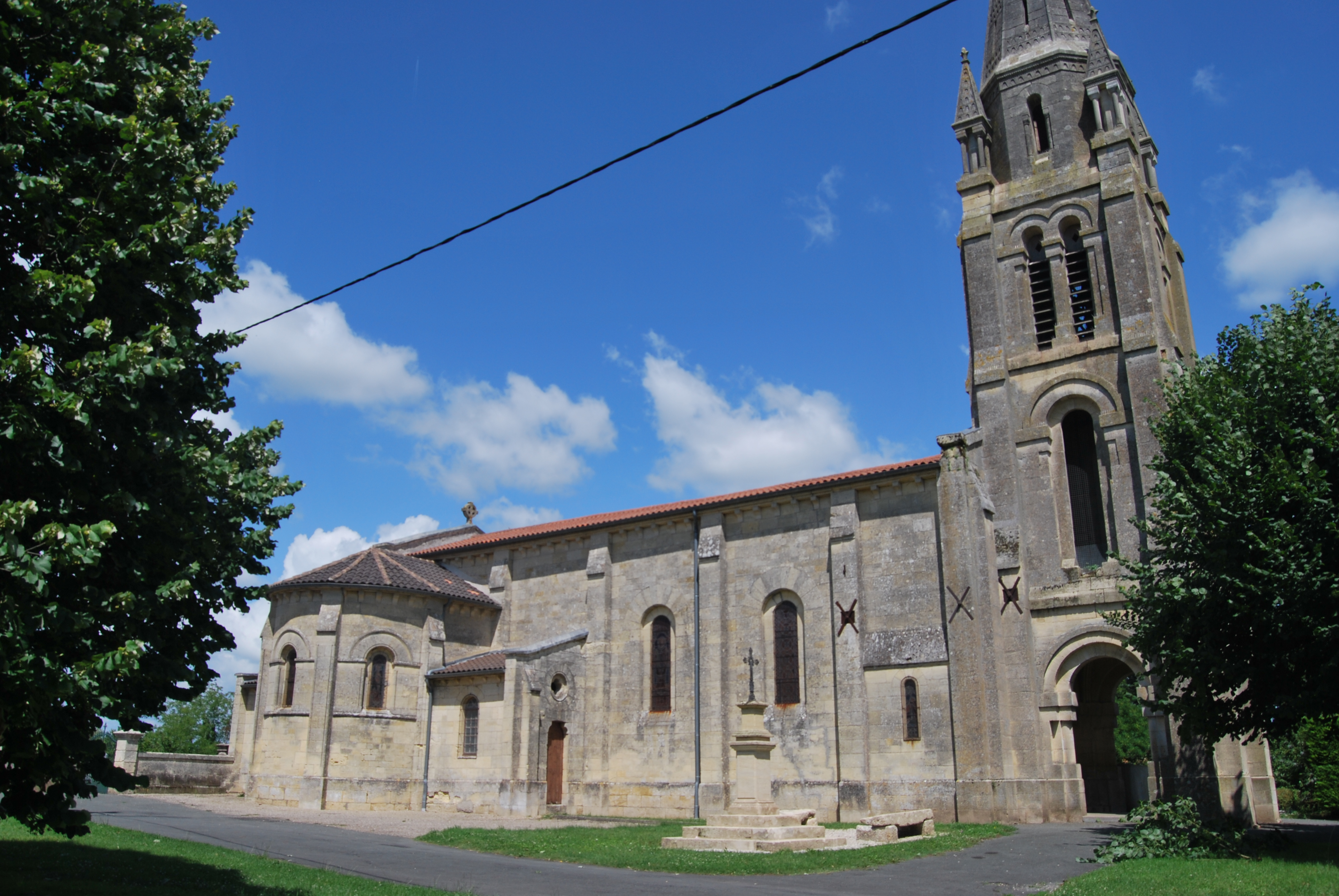
- The church in Civrac-sur-Dordogne

- Coat of arms
- Location of Civrac-sur-Dordogne
- Location within France Location within Nouvelle-Aquitaine
- Coordinates: 44°49′51″N 0°04′49″W
- Country: France
- Region: Nouvelle-Aquitaine
- Department: Gironde
- Arrondissement: Libourne
- Canton: Les Coteaux de Dordogne
- Intercommunality: Castillon Pujols

Government
  - Mayor (2020–2026): Jacques Angely
- Area^{1}: 1.94 km^{2} (0.75 sq mi)
- Elevation: 6 m (20 ft)
- Highest elevation: 10 m (33 ft)
- Lowest elevation: 2 m (6.6 ft)
- Population (2023): 206
  - Density: 106/km^{2} (275/sq mi)
- Time zone: UTC+01:00 (CET)
  - Summer (DST): UTC+02:00 (CEST)
- INSEE/Postal code: 33127 /33350
- ^{1} French Land Register data, which excludes lakes, ponds, glaciers > 1 km^{2} (0.386 sq mi or 247 acres) and river estuaries.

Civrac-sur-Dordogne (French pronunciation: [sivʁak syʁ dɔʁdɔɲ], literally Civrac on Dordogne; Occitan: Sivrac de Dordonha, before 1991: Civrac-de-Dordogne) is a commune in the Gironde department in Nouvelle-Aquitaine in southwestern France.

== Population ==
Historical population
Year	Pop.	±% p.a.
1968	182	—
1975	189	+0.54%
1982	191	+0.15%
1990	206	+0.95%
1999	225	+0.99%
2007	240	+0.81%
2012	212	−2.45%
2017	223	+1.02%
2023	206	−1.31%
Source: INSEE

== See also ==
- Communes of the Gironde department
