= Lugaignac =

- Commune
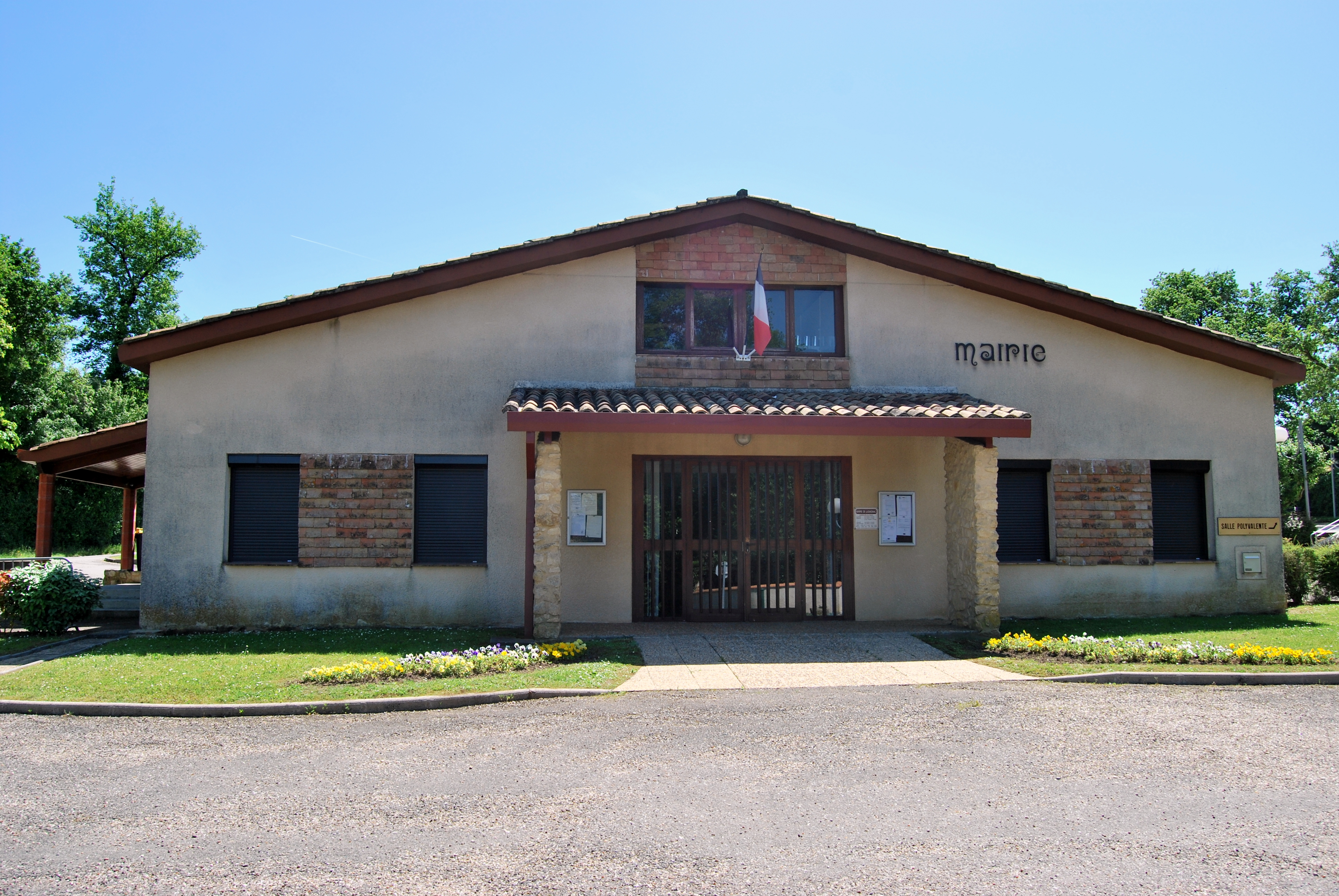
- The town hall in Lugaignac

- Coat of arms
- Location of Lugaignac
- Location within France Location within Nouvelle-Aquitaine
- Coordinates: 44°48′57″N 0°11′33″W
- Country: France
- Region: Nouvelle-Aquitaine
- Department: Gironde
- Arrondissement: Libourne
- Canton: Les Coteaux de Dordogne

Government
  - Mayor (2020–2026): Jean-Claude Delfaut
- Area^{1}: 3.66 km^{2} (1.41 sq mi)
- Elevation: 60 m (200 ft)
- Highest elevation: 89 m (292 ft)
- Lowest elevation: 10 m (33 ft)
- Population (2023): 433
  - Density: 118/km^{2} (306/sq mi)
- Time zone: UTC+01:00 (CET)
  - Summer (DST): UTC+02:00 (CEST)
- INSEE/Postal code: 33257 /33420
- ^{1} French Land Register data, which excludes lakes, ponds, glaciers > 1 km^{2} (0.386 sq mi or 247 acres) and river estuaries.

Lugaignac (French pronunciation: [lyɡɛɲak]; Occitan: Luganhac) is a commune in the Gironde department in Nouvelle-Aquitaine in southwestern France.

== Population ==
Historical population
Year	Pop.	±% p.a.
1968	242	—
1975	240	−0.12%
1982	265	+1.43%
1990	290	+1.13%
1999	300	+0.38%
2007	357	+2.20%
2012	418	+3.21%
2017	479	+2.76%
2023	433	−1.67%
Source: INSEE

== Culture and sights ==
Saint-Martin Church. The building was listed as a historical monument in 1925.

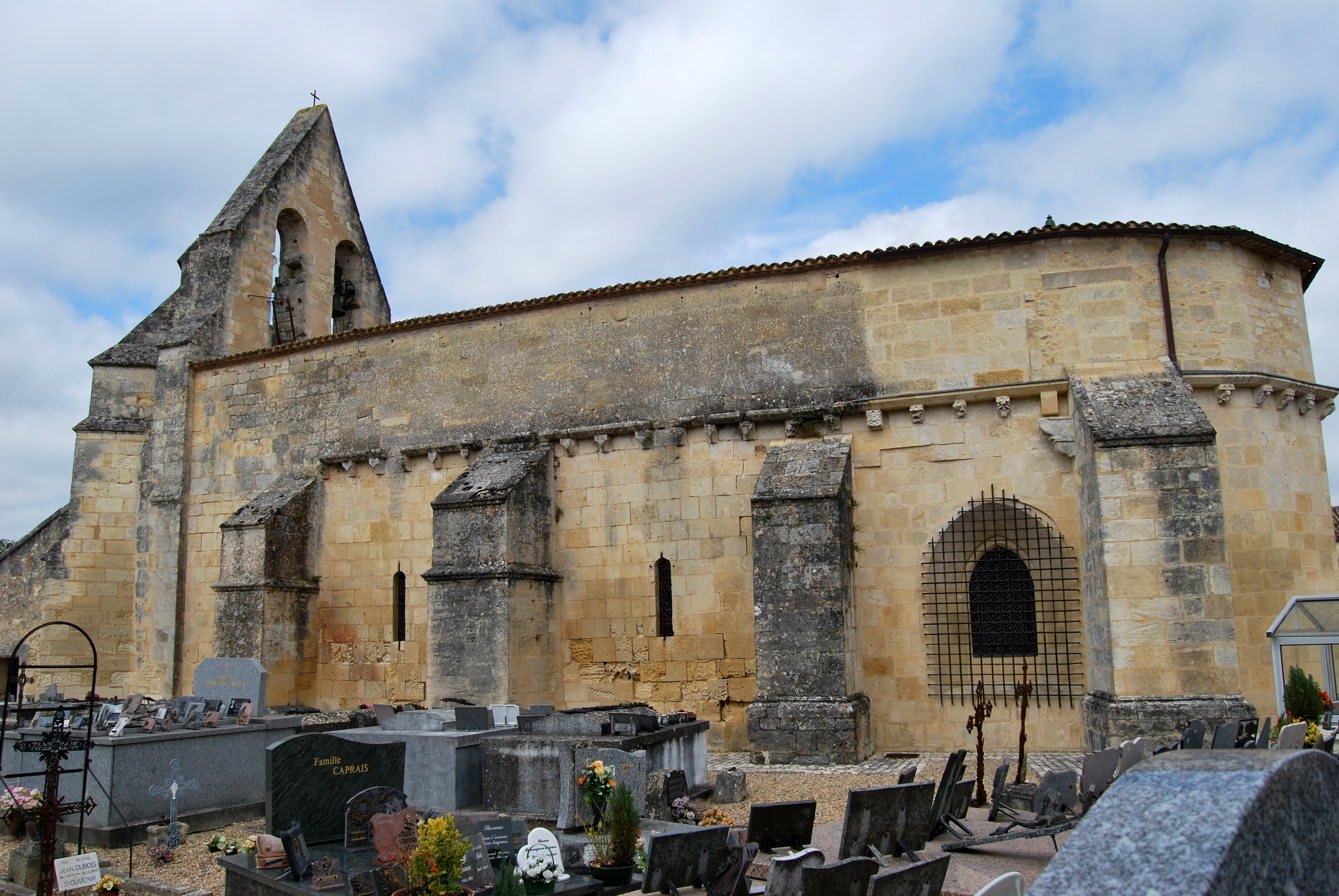
St. Martin's Church

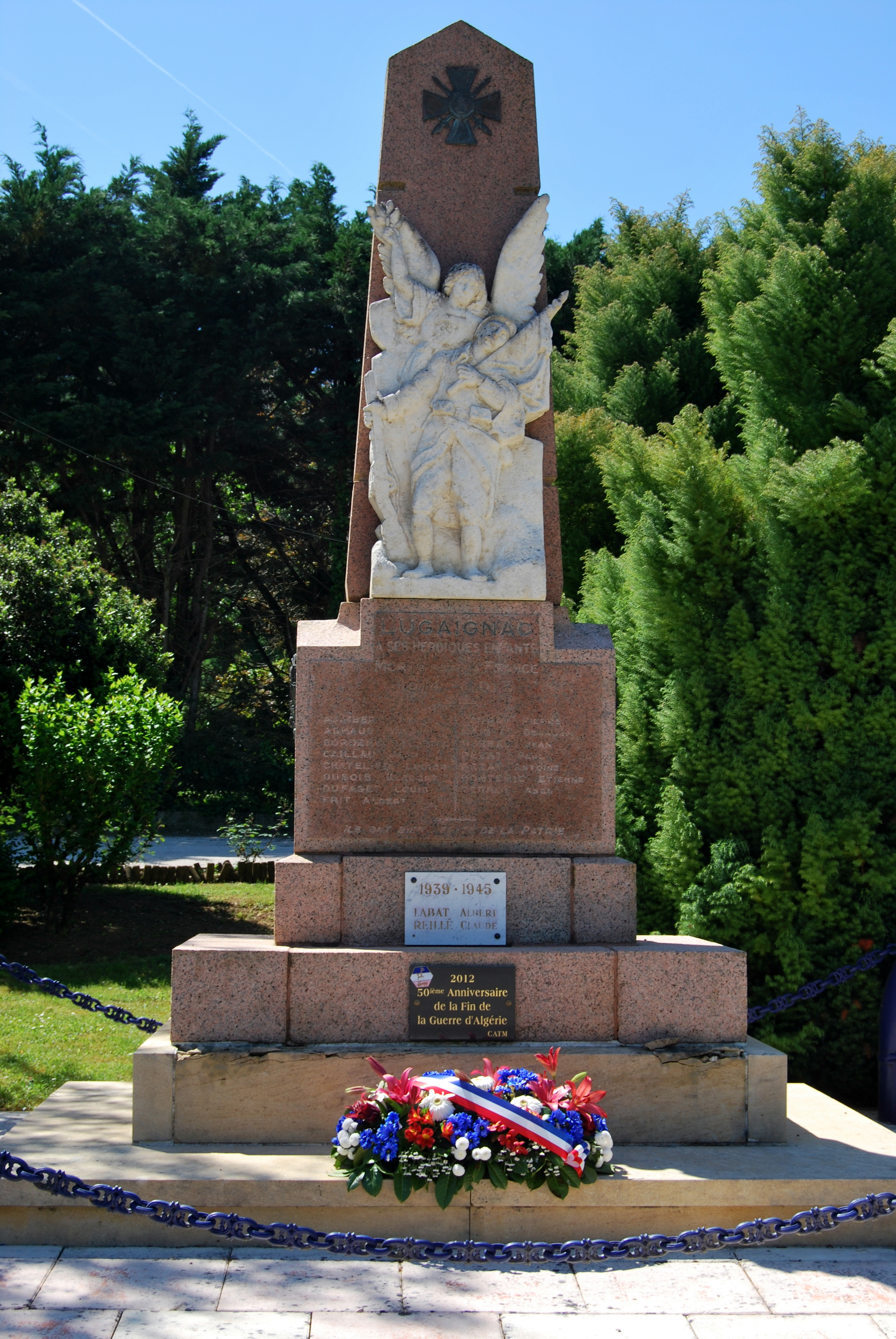
War Memorial

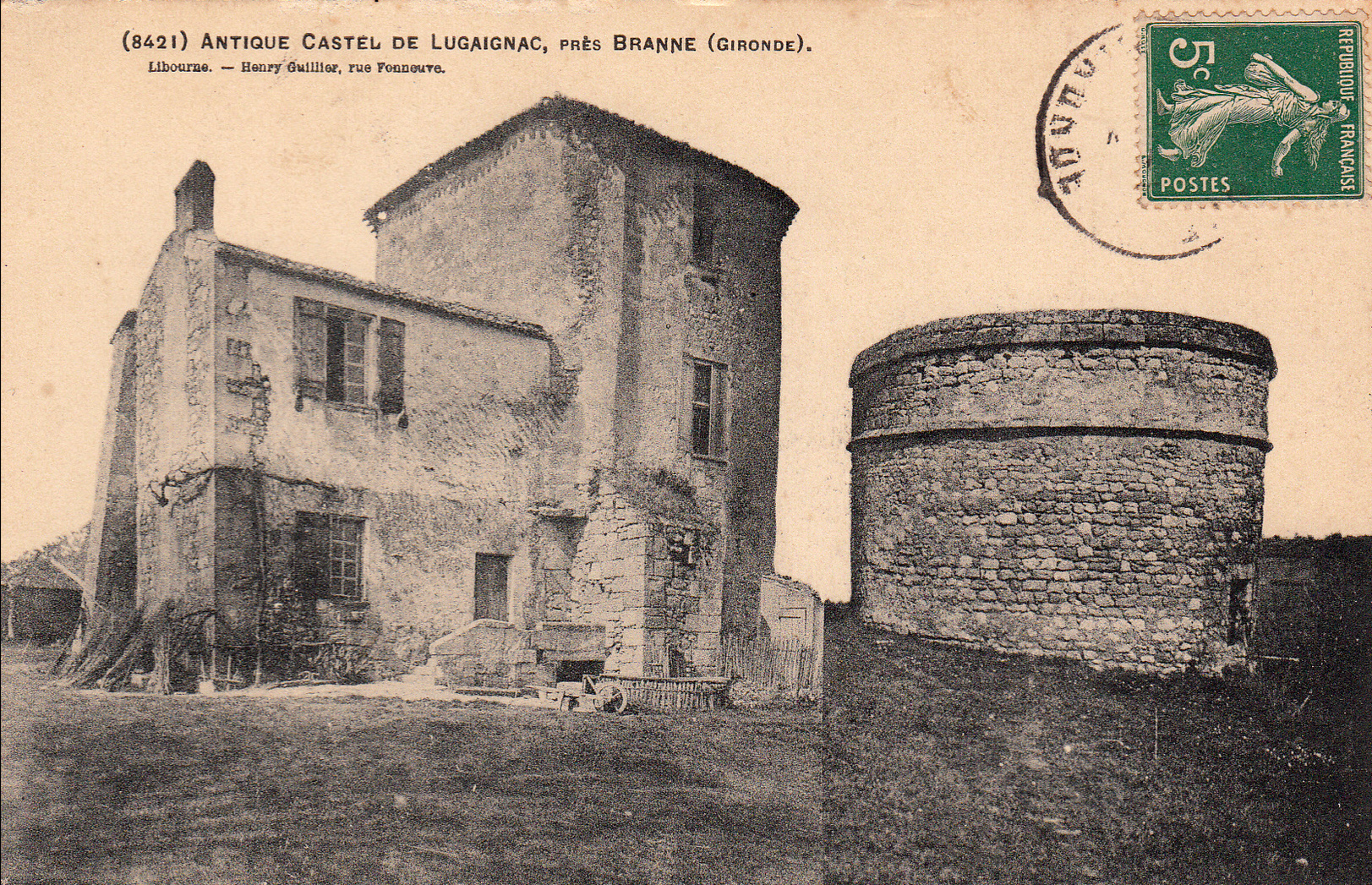
Ancient castle

== Heraldry ==
Arms of Lugaignac	Party: 1st azure a sword low argent placed bendwise and supporting a mantle or, 2nd argent a bunch of grapes purpure, leaved and vine-covered natural; all surmounted by a chief gules charged with a leopard or armed and langued azure.

== See also ==
- Communes of the Gironde department
