= Cabara =

- Commune
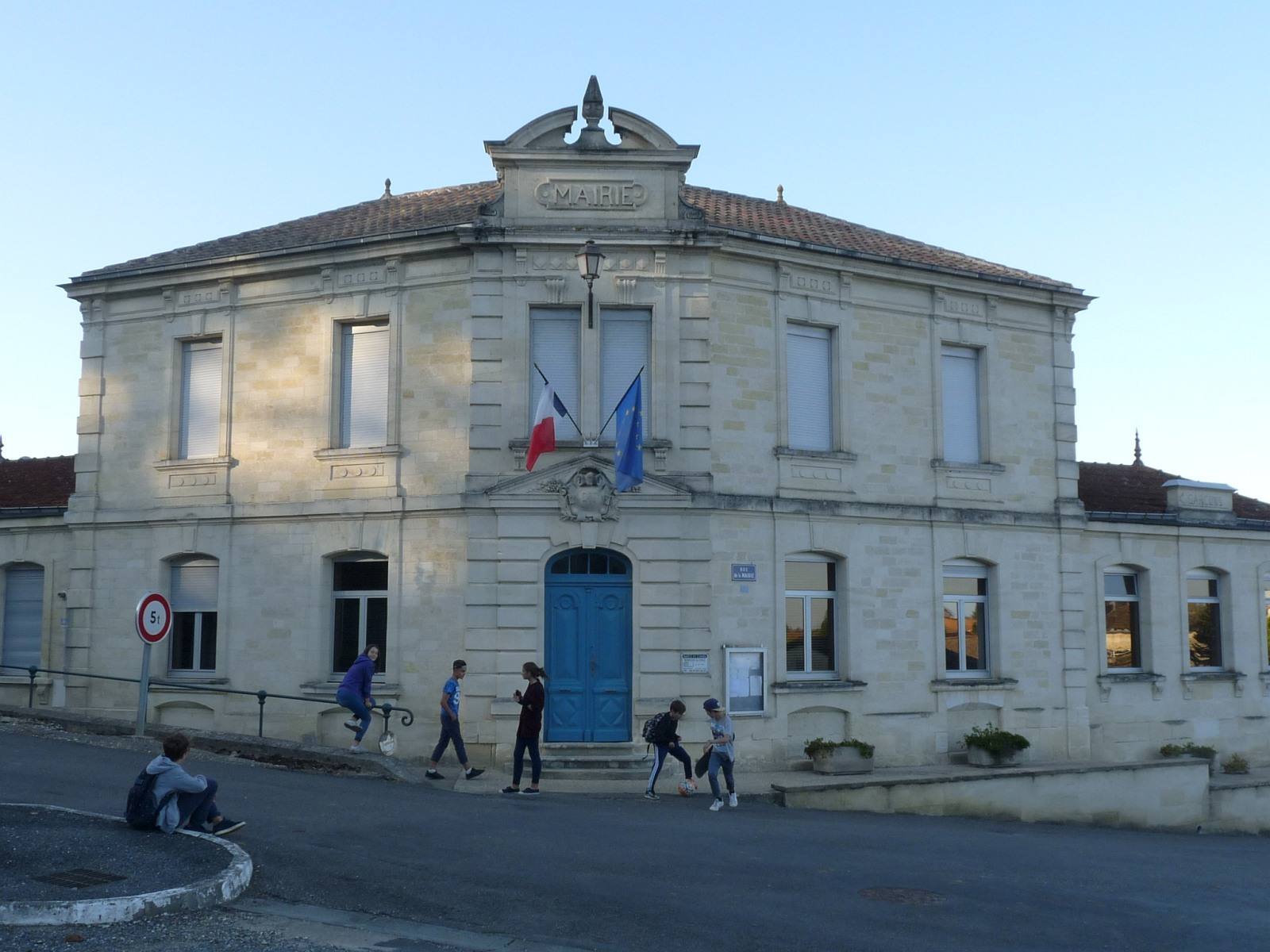
- The town hall in Cabara
- Location of Cabara
- Location within France Location within Nouvelle-Aquitaine
- Coordinates: 44°49′41″N 0°09′31″W
- Country: France
- Region: Nouvelle-Aquitaine
- Department: Gironde
- Arrondissement: Libourne
- Canton: Les Coteaux de Dordogne
- Intercommunality: Castillon-Pujols

Government
  - Mayor (2020–2026): Thierry Blanc
- Area^{1}: 3.42 km^{2} (1.32 sq mi)
- Elevation: 18 m (59 ft)
- Highest elevation: 63 m (207 ft)
- Lowest elevation: 2 m (6.6 ft)
- Population (2023): 526
  - Density: 154/km^{2} (398/sq mi)
- Time zone: UTC+01:00 (CET)
  - Summer (DST): UTC+02:00 (CEST)
- INSEE/Postal code: 33078 /33420
- ^{1} French Land Register data, which excludes lakes, ponds, glaciers > 1 km^{2} (0.386 sq mi or 247 acres) and river estuaries.

Cabara (French pronunciation: [kabaʁˈa]; Occitan: Cabarà) is a commune in the Gironde department in Nouvelle-Aquitaine in southwestern France.

== Population ==
Historical population
Year	Pop.	±% p.a.
1968	361	—
1975	335	−1.06%
1982	319	−0.70%
1990	341	+0.84%
1999	337	−0.13%
2007	348	+0.40%
2012	447	+5.13%
2017	513	+2.79%
2023	526	+0.42%
Source: INSEE

== See also ==
- Communes of the Gironde department
