= Sainte-Florence, Gironde =

Sainte-Florence
- Commune
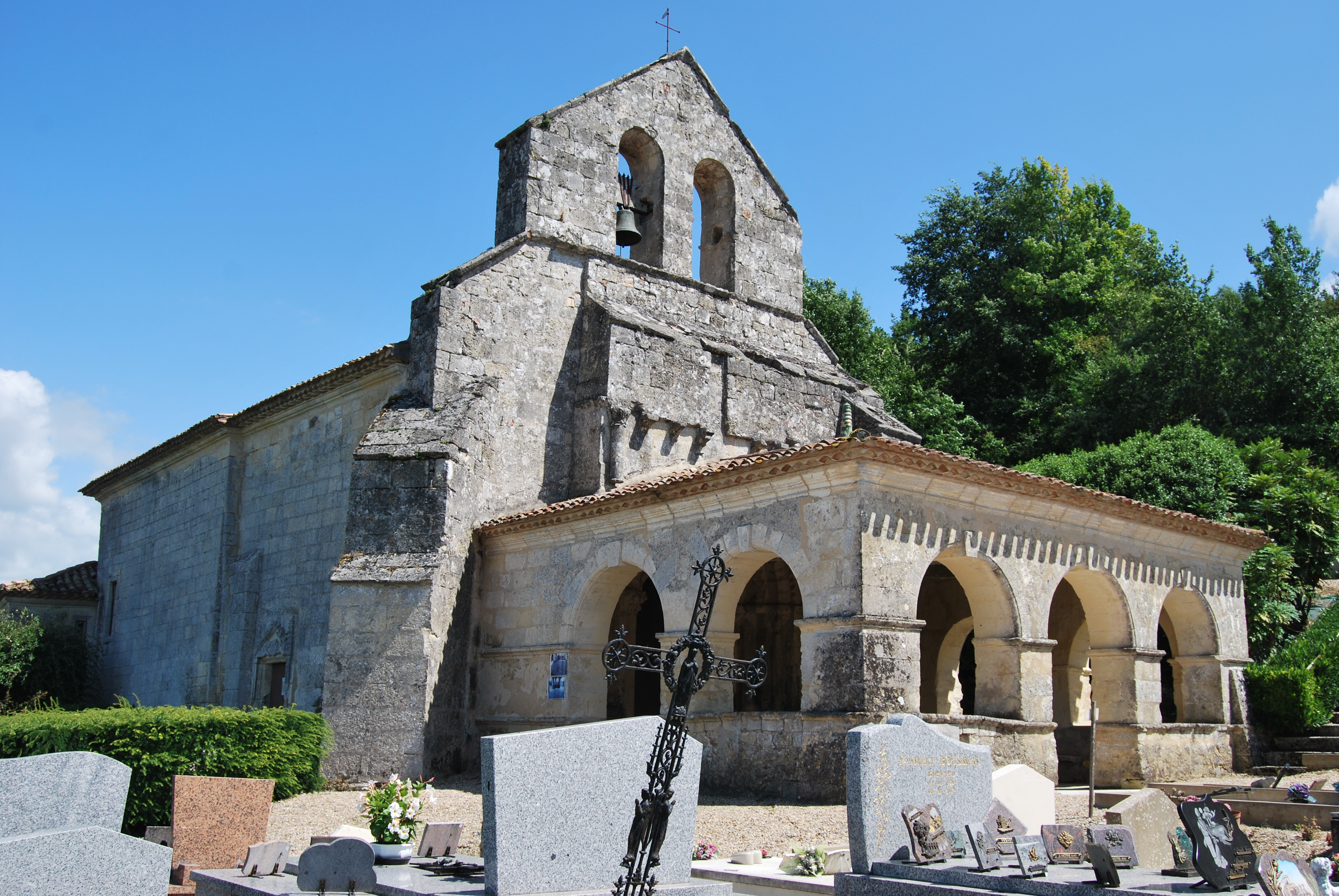
- The church in Sainte-Florence
- Location of Sainte-Florence
- Location within France Location within Nouvelle-Aquitaine
- Coordinates: 44°48′49″N 0°05′25″W
- Country: France
- Region: Nouvelle-Aquitaine
- Department: Gironde
- Arrondissement: Libourne
- Canton: Les Coteaux de Dordogne
- Intercommunality: Castillon-Pujols

Government
  - Mayor (2020–2026): David Amblevert
- Area^{1}: 3.21 km^{2} (1.24 sq mi)
- Elevation: 105 m (344 ft)
- Highest elevation: 82 m (269 ft)
- Lowest elevation: 3 m (9.8 ft)
- Population (2023): 146
  - Density: 45.5/km^{2} (118/sq mi)
- Time zone: UTC+01:00 (CET)
  - Summer (DST): UTC+02:00 (CEST)
- INSEE/Postal code: 33401 /33350
- ^{1} French Land Register data, which excludes lakes, ponds, glaciers > 1 km^{2} (0.386 sq mi or 247 acres) and river estuaries.

Sainte-Florence (French pronunciation: [sɛ̃t flɔʁɑ̃s]; Occitan: Senta Florença) is a commune in the Gironde department in Nouvelle-Aquitaine in southwestern France.

== Population ==
Historical population
Year	Pop.	±% p.a.
1968	119	—
1975	105	−1.77%
1982	107	+0.27%
1990	122	+1.65%
1999	129	+0.62%
2007	126	−0.29%
2012	137	+1.69%
2017	149	+1.69%
2023	146	−0.34%
Source: INSEE

== See also ==
- Communes of the Gironde department
