= Belvès-de-Castillon =

- Commune
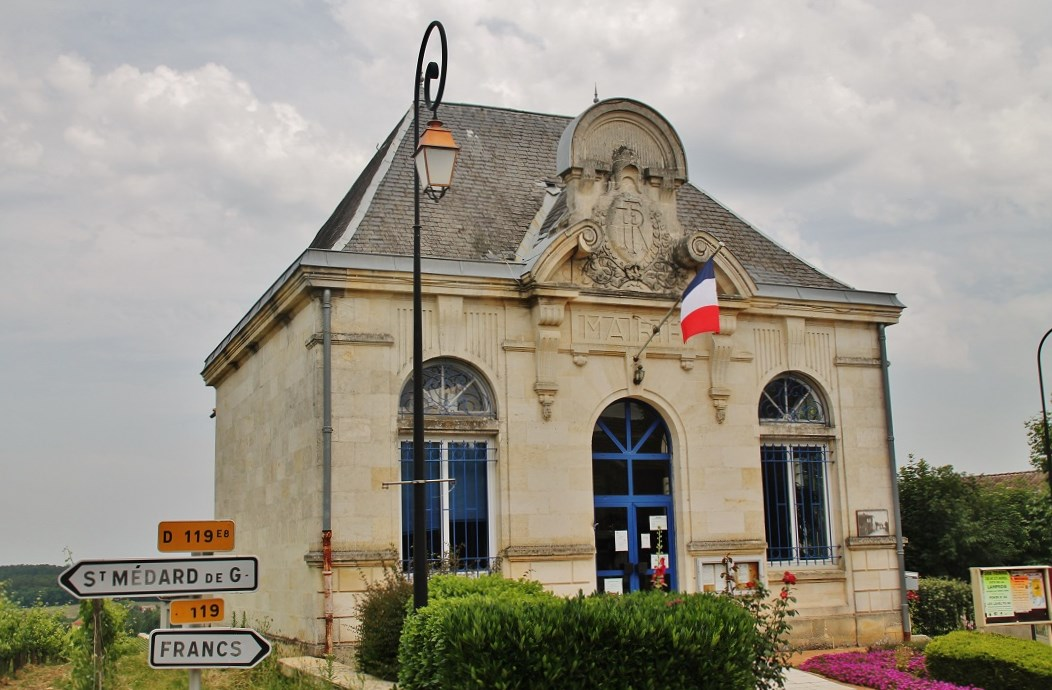
- The town hall in Belvès-de-Castillon
- Location of Belvès-de-Castillon
- Location within France Location within Nouvelle-Aquitaine
- Coordinates: 44°52′46″N 0°01′48″W
- Country: France
- Region: Nouvelle-Aquitaine
- Department: Gironde
- Arrondissement: Libourne
- Canton: Les Coteaux de Dordogne

Government
  - Mayor (2020–2026): Daniel Fenelon
- Area^{1}: 6.61 km^{2} (2.55 sq mi)
- Elevation: 81 m (266 ft)
- Highest elevation: 102 m (335 ft)
- Lowest elevation: 13 m (43 ft)
- Population (2023): 327
  - Density: 49.5/km^{2} (128/sq mi)
- Time zone: UTC+01:00 (CET)
  - Summer (DST): UTC+02:00 (CEST)
- INSEE/Postal code: 33045 /33350
- ^{1} French Land Register data, which excludes lakes, ponds, glaciers > 1 km^{2} (0.386 sq mi or 247 acres) and river estuaries.

Belvès-de-Castillon (French pronunciation: [bɛlvˈɛs də kastiˈjɔ̃], literally Belvès of Castillon; Occitan: Belvés de Castilhon) is a commune in the Gironde department in Nouvelle-Aquitaine in southwestern France.

== Population ==
Historical population
Year	Pop.	±% p.a.
1968	322	—
1975	280	−1.98%
1982	295	+0.75%
1990	325	+1.22%
1999	341	+0.54%
2007	327	−0.52%
2012	341	+0.84%
2017	333	−0.47%
2023	327	−0.30%
Source: INSEE

== See also ==
- Communes of the Gironde department
