= Juillac, Gironde =

Juillac
- Commune
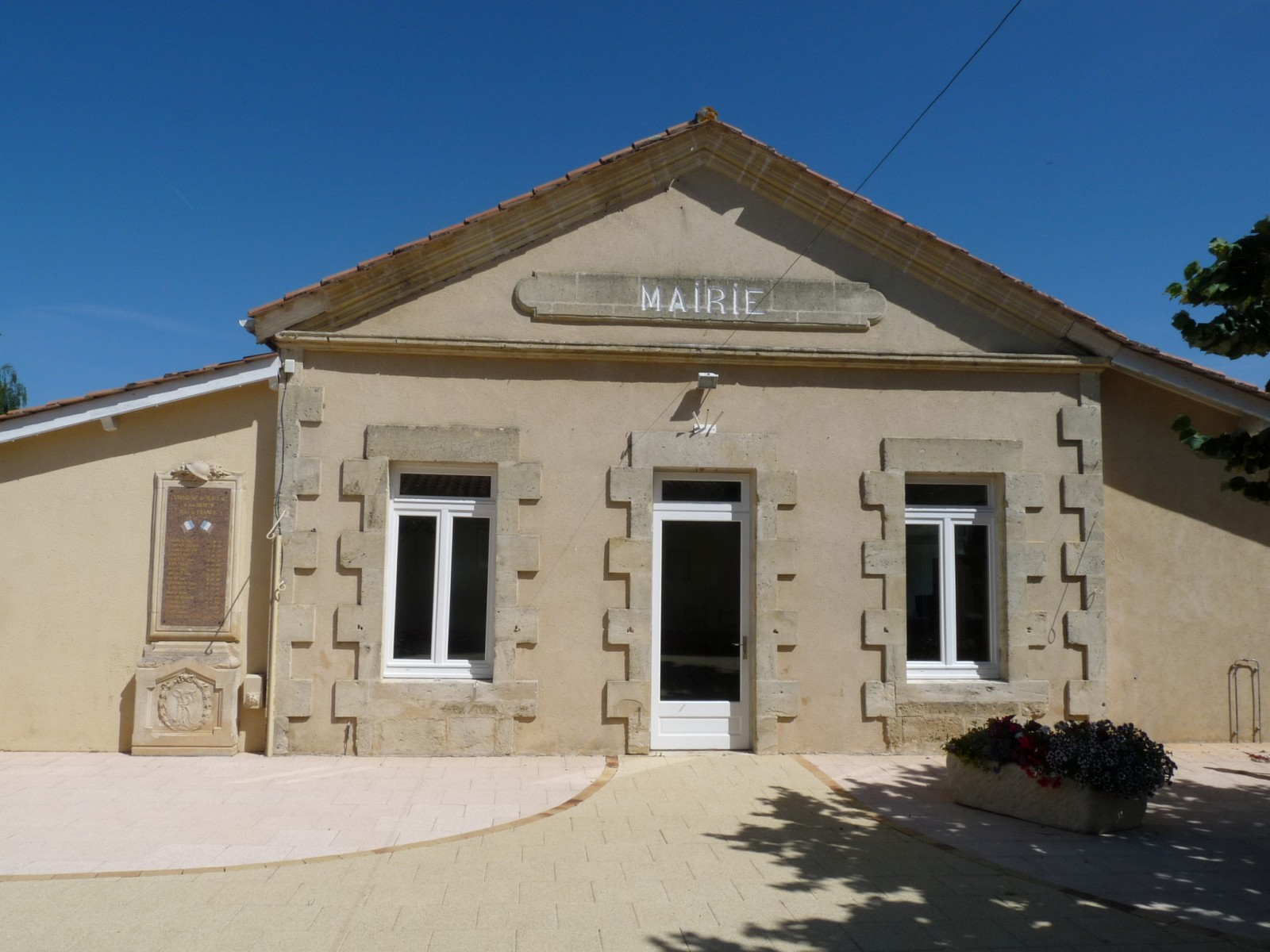
- The town hall in Juillac
- Location of Juillac
- Location within France Location within Nouvelle-Aquitaine
- Coordinates: 44°48′43″N 0°02′27″E
- Country: France
- Region: Nouvelle-Aquitaine
- Department: Gironde
- Arrondissement: Libourne
- Canton: Les Coteaux de Dordogne
- Intercommunality: Castillon Pujols

Government
  - Mayor (2020–2026): Bernard Lamouroux
- Area^{1}: 5.86 km^{2} (2.26 sq mi)
- Elevation: 103 m (338 ft)
- Highest elevation: 108 m (354 ft)
- Lowest elevation: 2 m (6.6 ft)
- Population (2023): 216
  - Density: 36.9/km^{2} (95.5/sq mi)
- Time zone: UTC+01:00 (CET)
  - Summer (DST): UTC+02:00 (CEST)
- INSEE/Postal code: 33210 /33890
- ^{1} French Land Register data, which excludes lakes, ponds, glaciers > 1 km^{2} (0.386 sq mi or 247 acres) and river estuaries.

Juillac (French pronunciation: [ʒɥijak]; Occitan: Julhac) is a commune in the Gironde department in Nouvelle-Aquitaine in southwestern France.

== Population ==
Historical population
Year	Pop.	±% p.a.
1968	262	—
1975	201	−3.72%
1982	218	+1.17%
1990	200	−1.07%
1999	205	+0.27%
2007	256	+2.82%
2012	258	+0.16%
2017	240	−1.44%
2023	216	−1.74%
Source: INSEE

== See also ==
- Communes of the Gironde department
