= Saint-Vincent-de-Pertignas =

- Commune
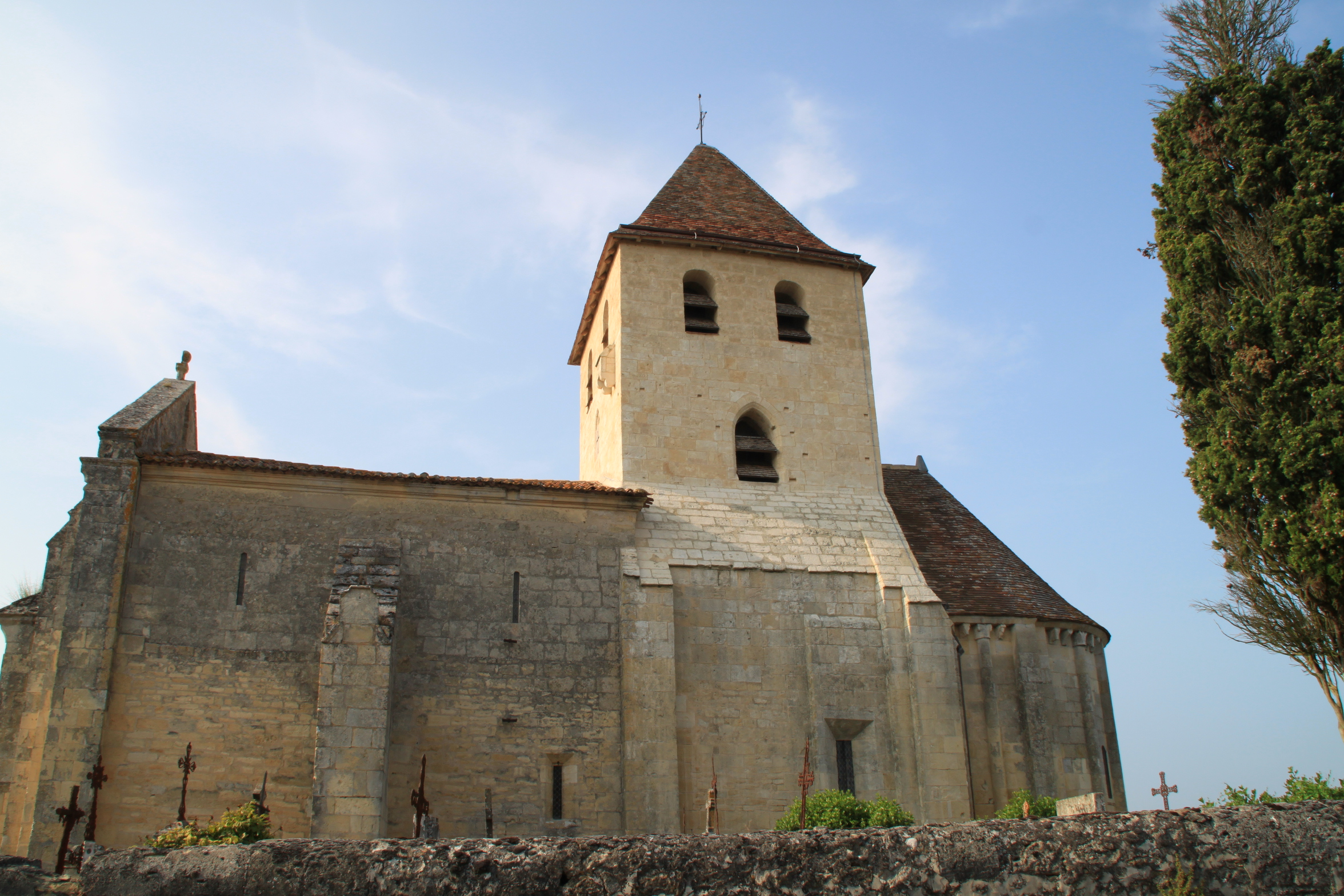
- The church in Saint-Vincent-de-Pertignas
- Location of Saint-Vincent-de-Pertignas
- Location within France Location within Nouvelle-Aquitaine
- Coordinates: 44°47′54″N 0°06′39″W
- Country: France
- Region: Nouvelle-Aquitaine
- Department: Gironde
- Arrondissement: Libourne
- Canton: Les Coteaux de Dordogne
- Intercommunality: Castillon Pujols

Government
  - Mayor (2020–2026): Pierre Gauthier
- Area^{1}: 7.61 km^{2} (2.94 sq mi)
- Elevation: 61 m (200 ft)
- Highest elevation: 88 m (289 ft)
- Lowest elevation: 2 m (6.6 ft)
- Population (2023): 331
  - Density: 43.5/km^{2} (113/sq mi)
- Time zone: UTC+01:00 (CET)
  - Summer (DST): UTC+02:00 (CEST)
- INSEE/Postal code: 33488 /33420
- ^{1} French Land Register data, which excludes lakes, ponds, glaciers > 1 km^{2} (0.386 sq mi or 247 acres) and river estuaries.

Saint-Vincent-de-Pertignas (Occitan: Sant Vincent de Pertinhadas) is a commune in the Gironde department in Nouvelle-Aquitaine in southwestern France.

== Population ==
Historical population
Year	Pop.	±% p.a.
1968	442	—
1975	382	−2.06%
1982	396	+0.52%
1990	377	−0.61%
1999	369	−0.24%
2007	331	−1.35%
2012	369	+2.20%
2017	385	+0.85%
2023	331	−2.49%
Source: INSEE

== Geography ==
The commune contains a number of farms, vineyards, homes and a medieval church (pictured). It is a short walk to Rauzan, the next commune over, to the south. The ruins of the castle in Rauzan are visible from Saint-Vincent-de-Pertignas. The nearest train station from Saint-Vincent-de-Pertignas is located in Libourne. Saint-Vincent-de-Pertignas is bounded to the north by Dordogne and the Gamage river.

== History ==
A cemetery that dates to the Merovingian dynasty was discovered in the commune's heart in 1986, showing that Saint-Vincent-de-Pertignas has been inhabited for a great length of time.

== See also ==
- Communes of the Gironde department
