= Sainte-Terre =

- Commune
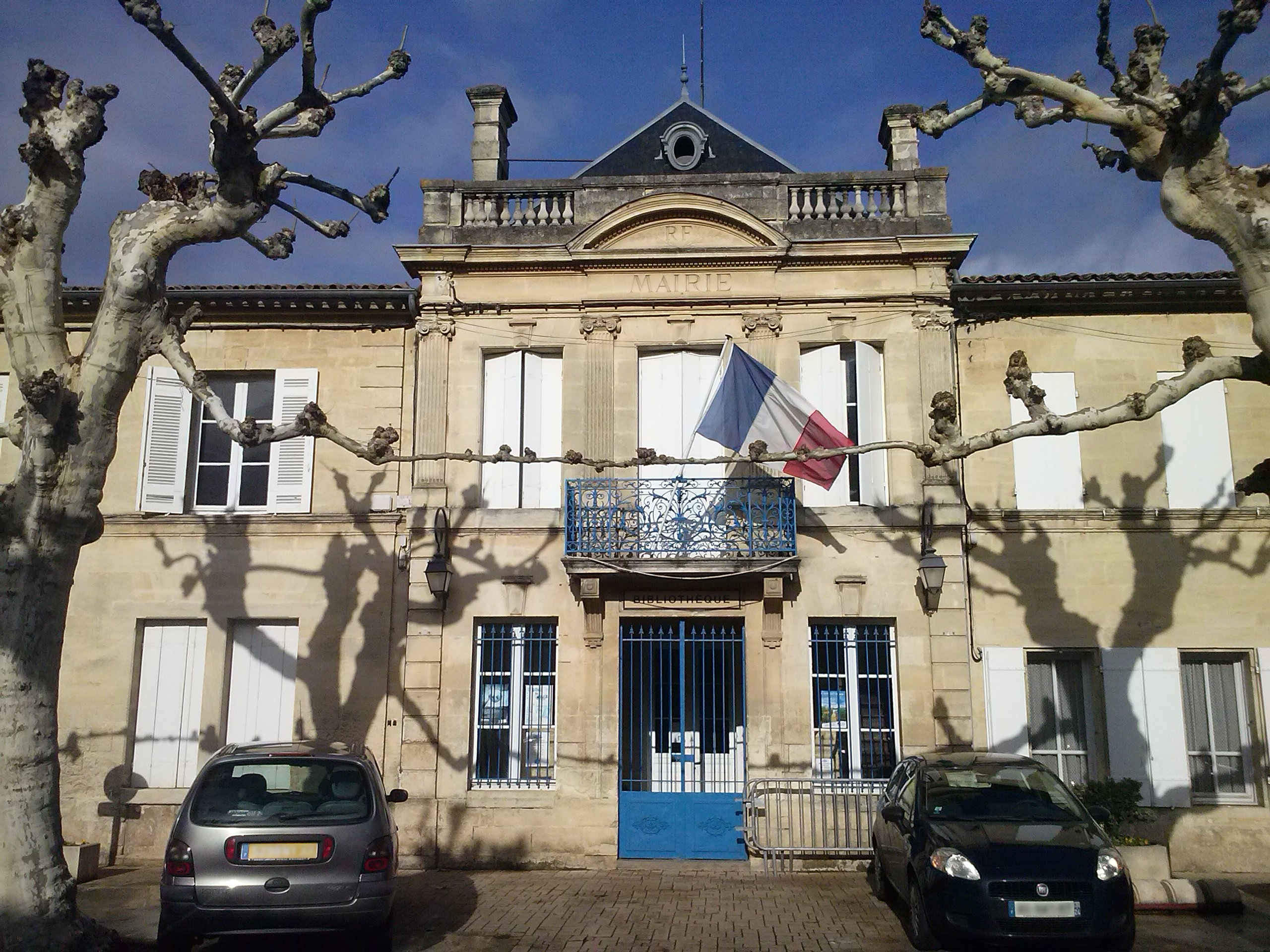
- Town hall

- Coat of arms
- Location of Sainte-Terre
- Location within France Location within Nouvelle-Aquitaine
- Coordinates: 44°49′44″N 0°06′41″W
- Country: France
- Region: Nouvelle-Aquitaine
- Department: Gironde
- Arrondissement: Libourne
- Canton: Les Coteaux de Dordogne

Government
  - Mayor (2021–2026): Agnès Alfonso-Chariol
- Area^{1}: 13.93 km^{2} (5.38 sq mi)
- Elevation: 10 m (33 ft)
- Highest elevation: 16 m (52 ft)
- Lowest elevation: 2 m (6.6 ft)
- Population (2023): 1,883
  - Density: 135.2/km^{2} (350.1/sq mi)
- Time zone: UTC+01:00 (CET)
  - Summer (DST): UTC+02:00 (CEST)
- INSEE/Postal code: 33485 /33350
- ^{1} French Land Register data, which excludes lakes, ponds, glaciers > 1 km^{2} (0.386 sq mi or 247 acres) and river estuaries.

Sainte-Terre (French pronunciation: [sɛ̃t tɛʁ]; Occitan: Senta Tèrra) is a commune in the Gironde department in Nouvelle-Aquitaine in southwestern France.

== Population ==
Historical population
Year	Pop.	±% p.a.
1968	1,407	—
1975	1,355	−0.54%
1982	1,416	+0.63%
1990	1,564	+1.25%
1999	1,635	+0.49%
2007	1,751	+0.86%
2012	1,908	+1.73%
2017	1,883	−0.26%
2023	1,883	+0.00%
Source: INSEE

== See also ==
- Communes of the Gironde department
