= Bossugan =

- Commune
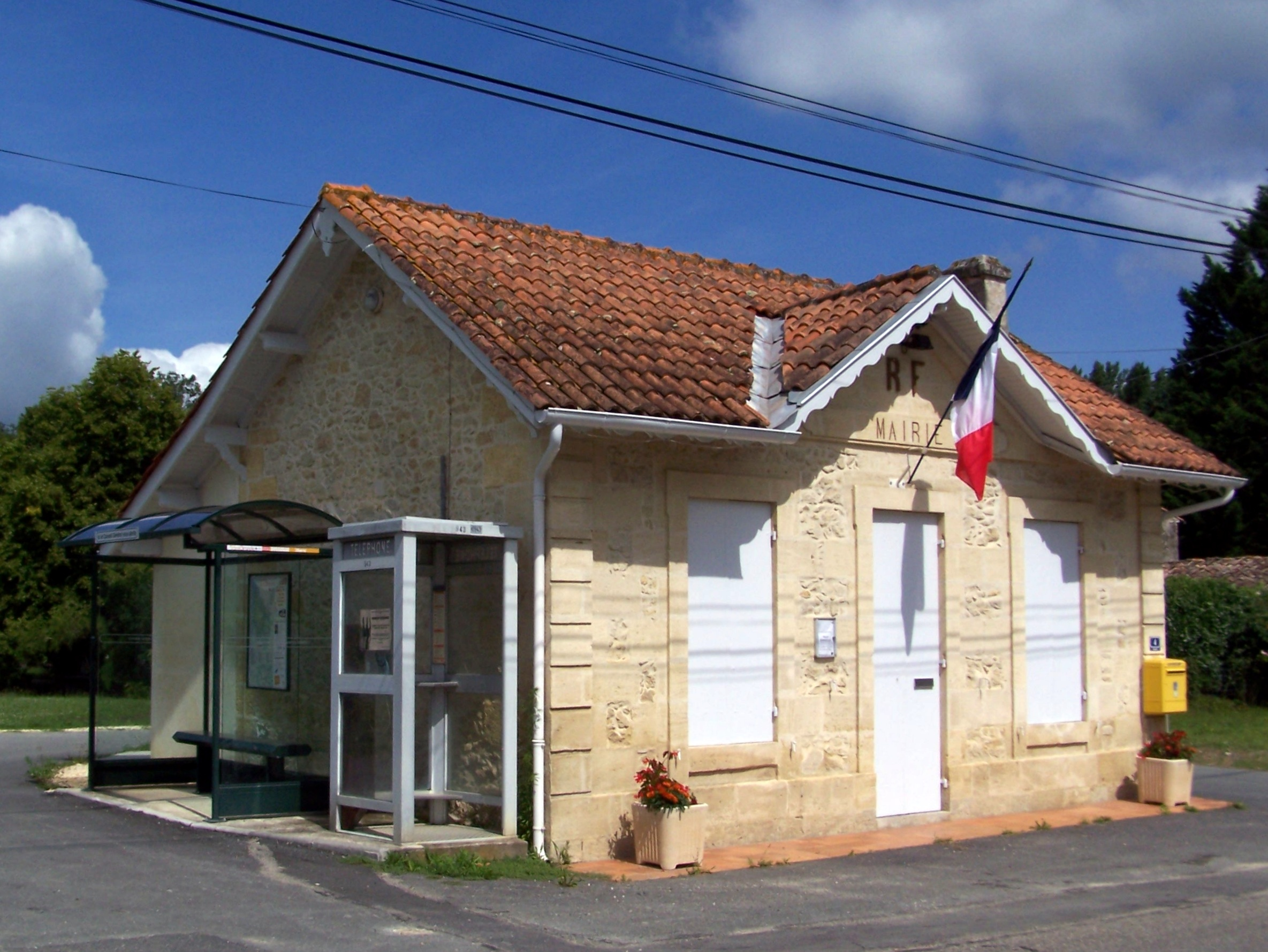
- The town hall in Bossugan
- Location of Bossugan
- Location within France Location within Nouvelle-Aquitaine
- Coordinates: 44°47′33″N 0°02′40″W
- Country: France
- Region: Nouvelle-Aquitaine
- Department: Gironde
- Arrondissement: Libourne
- Canton: Les Coteaux de Dordogne
- Intercommunality: Castillon Pujols

Government
  - Mayor (2020–2026): Pascale Quebec
- Area^{1}: 2.42 km^{2} (0.93 sq mi)
- Elevation: 30 m (98 ft)
- Highest elevation: 90 m (300 ft)
- Lowest elevation: 13 m (43 ft)
- Population (2023): 49
  - Density: 20/km^{2} (52/sq mi)
- Time zone: UTC+01:00 (CET)
  - Summer (DST): UTC+02:00 (CEST)
- INSEE/Postal code: 33064 /33350
- ^{1} French Land Register data, which excludes lakes, ponds, glaciers > 1 km^{2} (0.386 sq mi or 247 acres) and river estuaries.

Bossugan (French pronunciation: [bɔsyɡˈɑ̃]) is a commune in the Gironde department in Nouvelle-Aquitaine in southwestern France.

== Population ==
Historical population
Year	Pop.	±% p.a.
1968	65	—
1975	41	−6.37%
1982	59	+5.34%
1990	55	−0.87%
1999	55	+0.00%
2007	45	−2.48%
2012	49	+1.72%
2017	39	−4.46%
2023	49	+3.88%
Source: INSEE

== See also ==
- Communes of the Gironde department
