= Saint-Pey-de-Castets =

- Commune
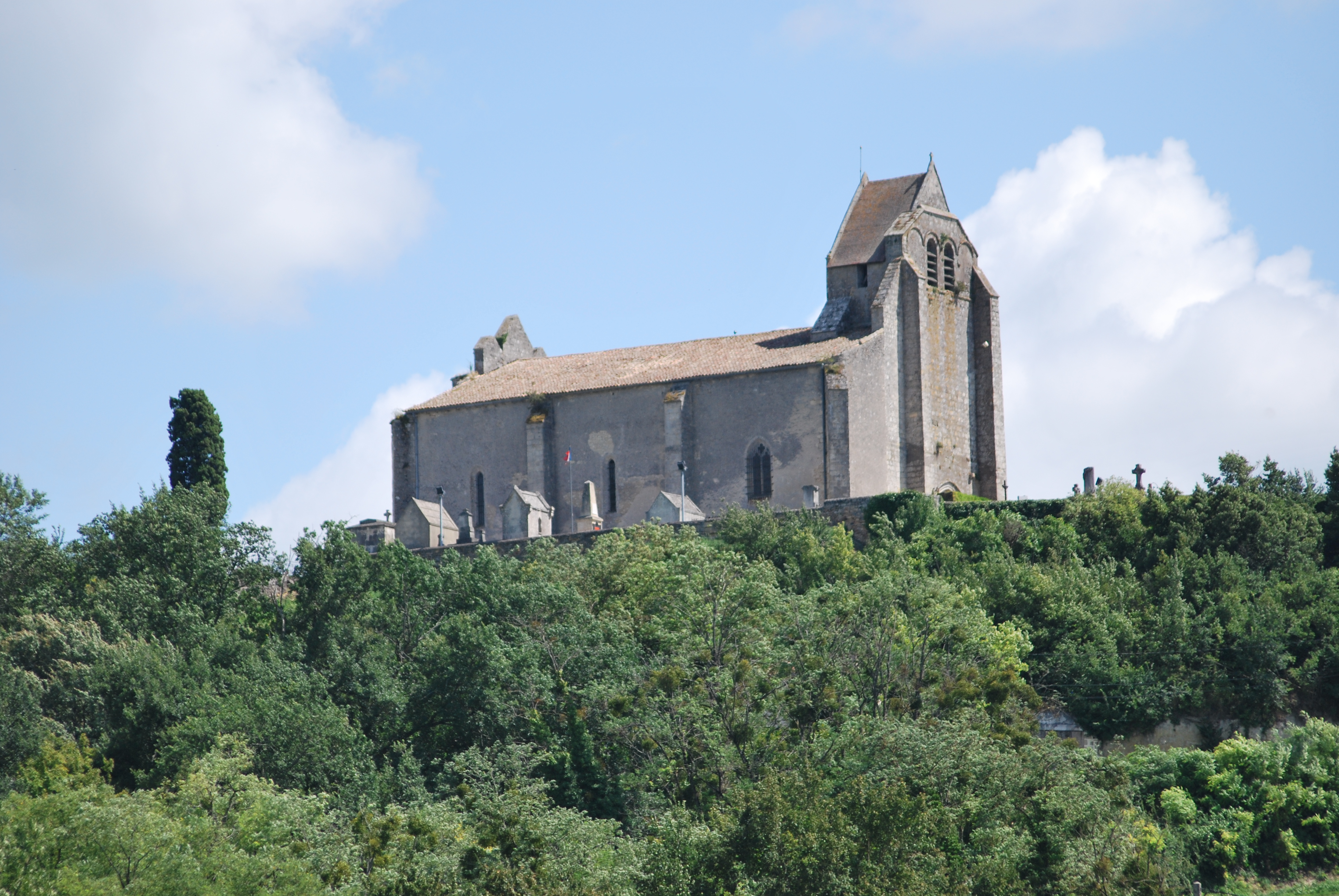
- The church in Saint-Pey-de-Castets
- Location of Saint-Pey-de-Castets
- Location within France Location within Nouvelle-Aquitaine
- Coordinates: 44°48′42″N 0°04′02″W
- Country: France
- Region: Nouvelle-Aquitaine
- Department: Gironde
- Arrondissement: Libourne
- Canton: Les Coteaux de Dordogne
- Intercommunality: Castillon Pujols

Government
  - Mayor (2020–2026): Liliane Poivert
- Area^{1}: 11.07 km^{2} (4.27 sq mi)
- Elevation: 93 m (305 ft)
- Highest elevation: 96 m (315 ft)
- Lowest elevation: 1 m (3.3 ft)
- Population (2023): 588
  - Density: 53.1/km^{2} (138/sq mi)
- Time zone: UTC+01:00 (CET)
  - Summer (DST): UTC+02:00 (CEST)
- INSEE/Postal code: 33460 /33350
- ^{1} French Land Register data, which excludes lakes, ponds, glaciers > 1 km^{2} (0.386 sq mi or 247 acres) and river estuaries.

Saint-Pey-de-Castets is a commune in the Gironde department in Nouvelle-Aquitaine in southwestern France.

== Population ==
Historical population
Year	Pop.	±% p.a.
1968	484	—
1975	457	−0.82%
1982	520	+1.86%
1990	597	+1.74%
1999	617	+0.37%
2007	605	−0.25%
2012	643	+1.23%
2017	622	−0.66%
2023	588	−0.93%
Source: INSEE

== See also ==
- Communes of the Gironde department
