= Saint-Genès-de-Castillon =

- Commune
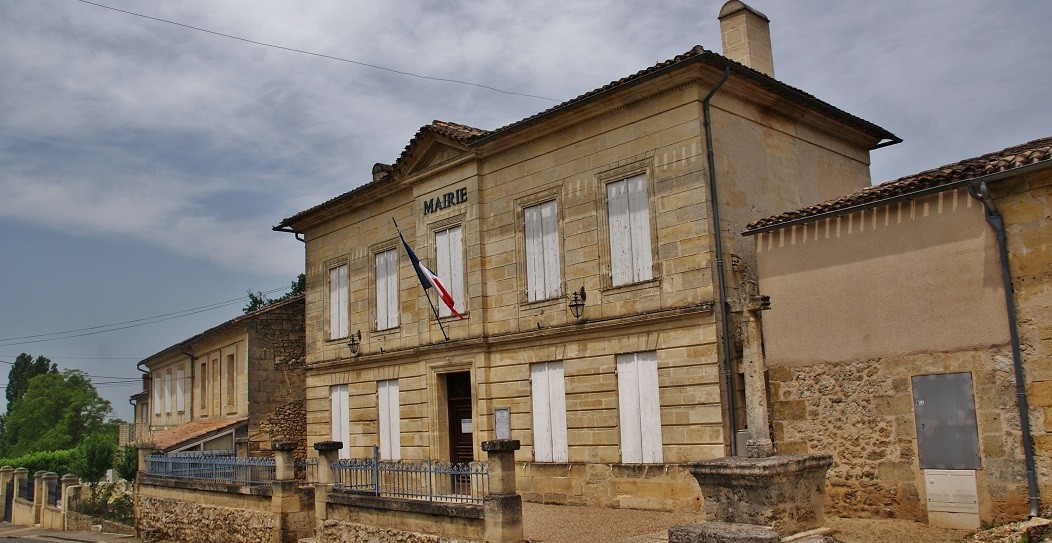
- The town hall in Saint-Genès-de-Castillon
- Location of Saint-Genès-de-Castillon
- Location within France Location within Nouvelle-Aquitaine
- Coordinates: 44°53′55″N 0°03′52″W
- Country: France
- Region: Nouvelle-Aquitaine
- Department: Gironde
- Arrondissement: Libourne
- Canton: Les Coteaux de Dordogne

Government
  - Mayor (2020–2026): Yannick Guimberteau
- Area^{1}: 6.8 km^{2} (2.6 sq mi)
- Elevation: 99 m (325 ft)
- Highest elevation: 98 m (322 ft)
- Lowest elevation: 32 m (105 ft)
- Population (2023): 361
  - Density: 53/km^{2} (140/sq mi)
- Time zone: UTC+01:00 (CET)
  - Summer (DST): UTC+02:00 (CEST)
- INSEE/Postal code: 33406 /33350
- ^{1} French Land Register data, which excludes lakes, ponds, glaciers > 1 km^{2} (0.386 sq mi or 247 acres) and river estuaries.

Saint-Genès-de-Castillon (Occitan: Sant Genès de Castilhon) is a commune in the Gironde department of Nouvelle-Aquitaine in southwestern France.

== Population ==
Historical population
Year	Pop.	±% p.a.
1968	454	—
1975	398	−1.86%
1982	402	+0.14%
1990	370	−1.03%
1999	389	+0.56%
2007	385	−0.13%
2012	395	+0.51%
2017	393	−0.10%
2023	361	−1.41%
Source: INSEE

== See also ==
- Communes of the Gironde department
