= Mouliets-et-Villemartin =

- Commune
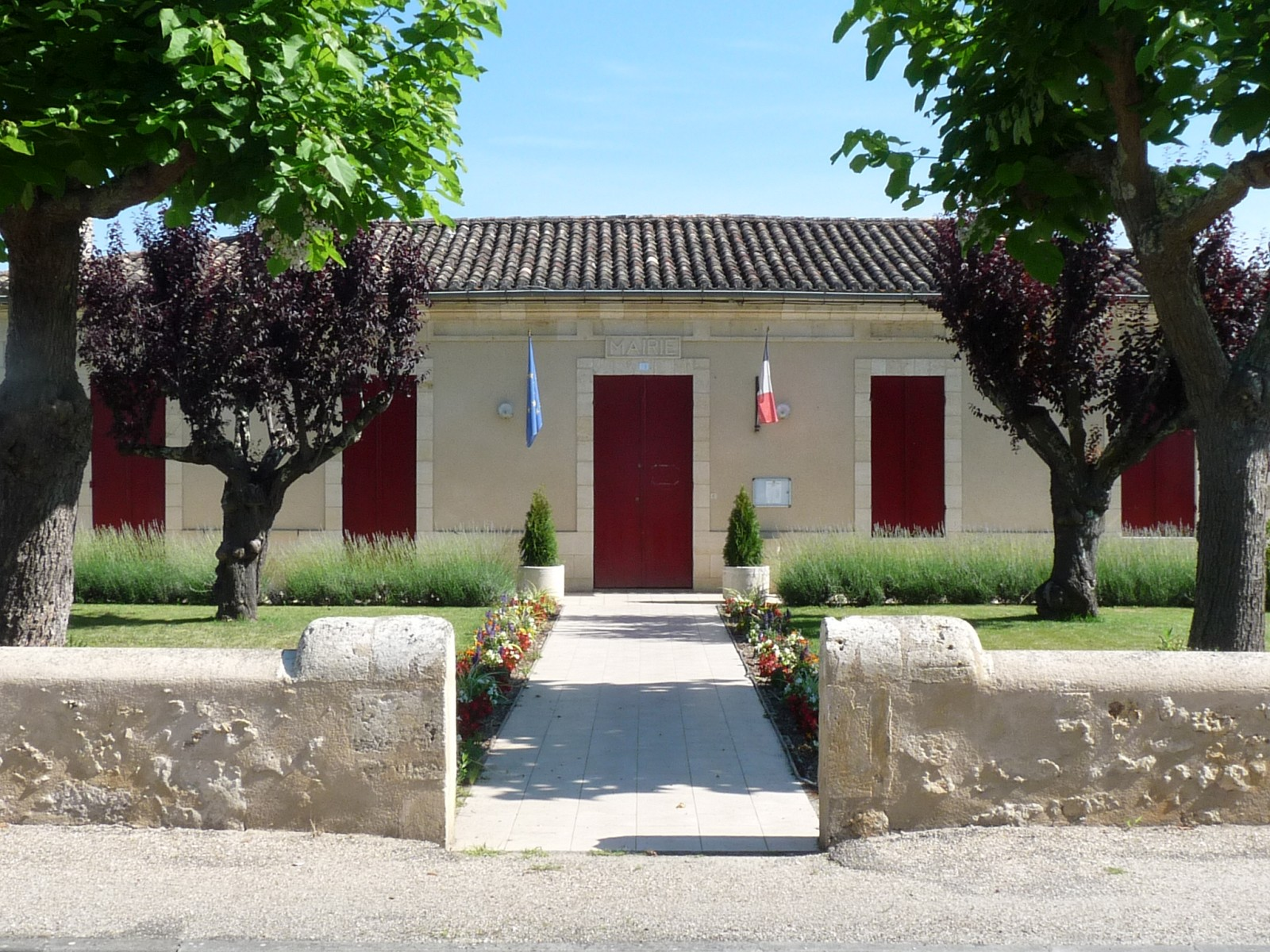
- The town hall in Mouliets
- Location of Mouliets-et-Villemartin
- Location within France Location within Nouvelle-Aquitaine
- Coordinates: 44°50′34″N 0°01′03″W
- Country: France
- Region: Nouvelle-Aquitaine
- Department: Gironde
- Arrondissement: Libourne
- Canton: Les Coteaux de Dordogne
- Intercommunality: Castillon Pujols

Government
  - Mayor (2020–2026): Patrick Coutarel
- Area^{1}: 15.91 km^{2} (6.14 sq mi)
- Elevation: 12 m (39 ft)
- Highest elevation: 93 m (305 ft)
- Lowest elevation: 2 m (6.6 ft)
- Population (2023): 1,041
  - Density: 65.43/km^{2} (169.5/sq mi)
- Time zone: UTC+01:00 (CET)
  - Summer (DST): UTC+02:00 (CEST)
- INSEE/Postal code: 33296 /33350
- ^{1} French Land Register data, which excludes lakes, ponds, glaciers > 1 km^{2} (0.386 sq mi or 247 acres) and river estuaries.

Mouliets-et-Villemartin is a commune in the Gironde department in Nouvelle-Aquitaine in southwestern France.

== Population ==
Historical population
Year	Pop.	±% p.a.
1968	743	—
1975	724	−0.37%
1982	801	+1.45%
1990	915	+1.68%
1999	1,009	+1.09%
2007	1,059	+0.61%
2012	1,079	+0.37%
2017	1,061	−0.34%
2023	1,041	−0.32%
Source: INSEE

== See also ==
- Communes of the Gironde department
