= Sainte-Colombe, Gironde =

Sainte-Colombe
- Commune
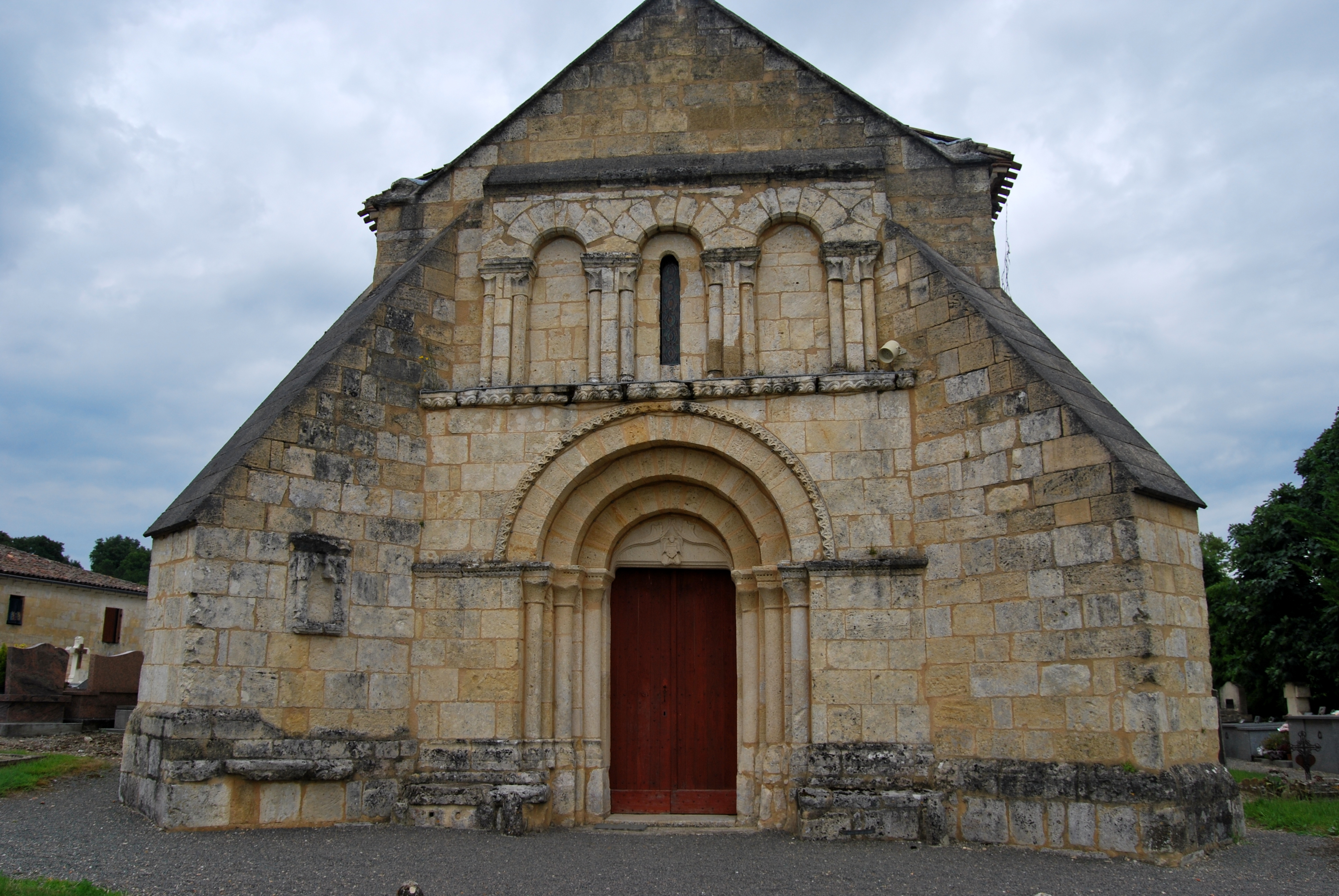
- The church in Sainte-Colombe
- Location of Sainte-Colombe
- Location within France Location within Nouvelle-Aquitaine
- Coordinates: 44°52′48″N 0°03′37″W
- Country: France
- Region: Nouvelle-Aquitaine
- Department: Gironde
- Arrondissement: Libourne
- Canton: Les Coteaux de Dordogne
- Intercommunality: Castillon-Pujols

Government
  - Mayor (2020–2026): Daniel Thibeau
- Area^{1}: 4.06 km^{2} (1.57 sq mi)
- Elevation: 88 m (289 ft)
- Highest elevation: 96 m (315 ft)
- Lowest elevation: 24 m (79 ft)
- Population (2023): 423
  - Density: 104/km^{2} (270/sq mi)
- Time zone: UTC+01:00 (CET)
  - Summer (DST): UTC+02:00 (CEST)
- INSEE/Postal code: 33390 /33350
- ^{1} French Land Register data, which excludes lakes, ponds, glaciers > 1 km^{2} (0.386 sq mi or 247 acres) and river estuaries.

Sainte-Colombe (French pronunciation: [sɛ̃t kɔlɔ̃b]; Languedocien: Senta Coloma) is a commune in the Gironde department in Nouvelle-Aquitaine in southwestern France.

== Population ==
Historical population
Year	Pop.	±% p.a.
1968	278	—
1975	256	−1.17%
1982	271	+0.82%
1990	361	+3.65%
1999	349	−0.37%
2007	392	+1.46%
2012	478	+4.05%
2017	422	−2.46%
2023	423	+0.04%
Source: INSEE

== See also ==
- Communes of the Gironde department
