= Grézillac =

- Commune
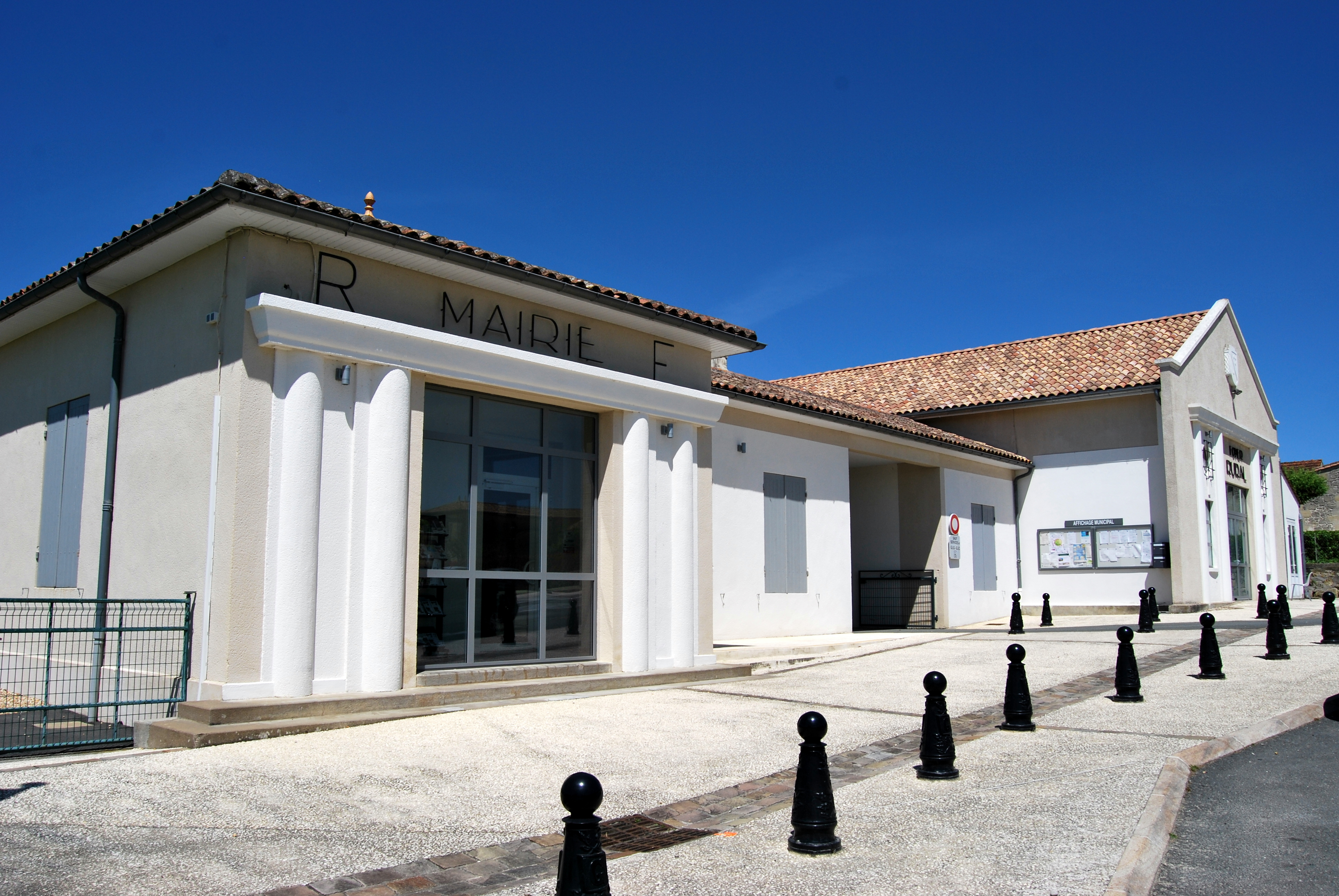
- The town hall in Grézillac
- Location of Grézillac
- Location within France Location within Nouvelle-Aquitaine
- Coordinates: 44°49′06″N 0°12′56″W
- Country: France
- Region: Nouvelle-Aquitaine
- Department: Gironde
- Arrondissement: Libourne
- Canton: Les Coteaux de Dordogne

Government
  - Mayor (2020–2026): Claude Nompeix
- Area^{1}: 7.79 km^{2} (3.01 sq mi)
- Elevation: 80 m (260 ft)
- Highest elevation: 83 m (272 ft)
- Lowest elevation: 3 m (9.8 ft)
- Population (2023): 693
  - Density: 89.0/km^{2} (230/sq mi)
- Time zone: UTC+01:00 (CET)
  - Summer (DST): UTC+02:00 (CEST)
- INSEE/Postal code: 33194 /33420
- ^{1} French Land Register data, which excludes lakes, ponds, glaciers > 1 km^{2} (0.386 sq mi or 247 acres) and river estuaries.

Grézillac (French pronunciation: [ɡʁezijak]) is a commune in the Gironde department in southwestern France.

== Population ==
Historical population
| Year | Pop. | ±% p.a. |
|---|---|---|
| 1968 | 786 | — |
| 1975 | 661 | −2.44% |
| 1982 | 683 | +0.47% |
| 1990 | 613 | −1.34% |
| 1999 | 610 | −0.05% |
| 2007 | 677 | +1.31% |
| 2012 | 703 | +0.76% |
| 2017 | 695 | −0.23% |
| 2023 | 693 | −0.05% |
Source: INSEE

== See also ==
- Communes of the Gironde department
