= Doulezon =

- Commune
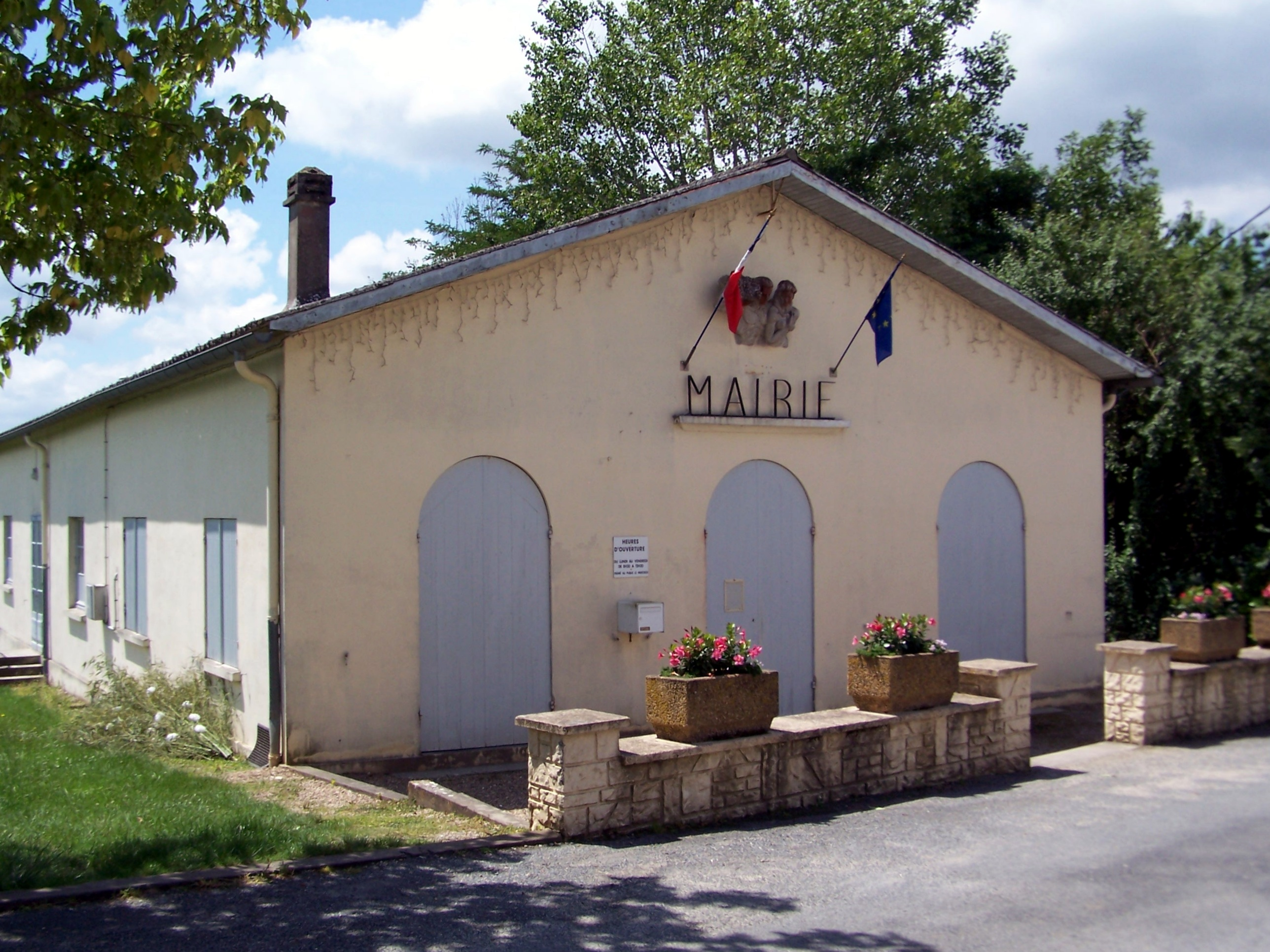
- The town hall in Doulezon
- Location of Doulezon
- Location within France Location within Nouvelle-Aquitaine
- Coordinates: 44°47′35″N 0°00′15″W
- Country: France
- Region: Nouvelle-Aquitaine
- Department: Gironde
- Arrondissement: Libourne
- Canton: Les Coteaux de Dordogne
- Intercommunality: Castillon Pujols

Government
  - Mayor (2020–2026): Christian Bourdier
- Area^{1}: 7.36 km^{2} (2.84 sq mi)
- Elevation: 89 m (292 ft)
- Highest elevation: 112 m (367 ft)
- Lowest elevation: 26 m (85 ft)
- Population (2023): 286
  - Density: 38.9/km^{2} (101/sq mi)
- Time zone: UTC+01:00 (CET)
  - Summer (DST): UTC+02:00 (CEST)
- INSEE/Postal code: 33153 /33350
- ^{1} French Land Register data, which excludes lakes, ponds, glaciers > 1 km^{2} (0.386 sq mi or 247 acres) and river estuaries.

Doulezon (French pronunciation: [dulzɔ̃]; Occitan: Doleson) is a commune in the Gironde department in southwestern France.

== Population ==
Historical population
Year	Pop.	±% p.a.
1968	327	—
1975	225	−5.20%
1982	183	−2.91%
1990	212	+1.86%
1999	230	+0.91%
2007	248	+0.95%
2012	262	+1.10%
2017	265	+0.23%
2023	286	+1.28%
Source: INSEE

== See also ==
- Communes of the Gironde department
