= Saint-Étienne-de-Lisse =

- Commune
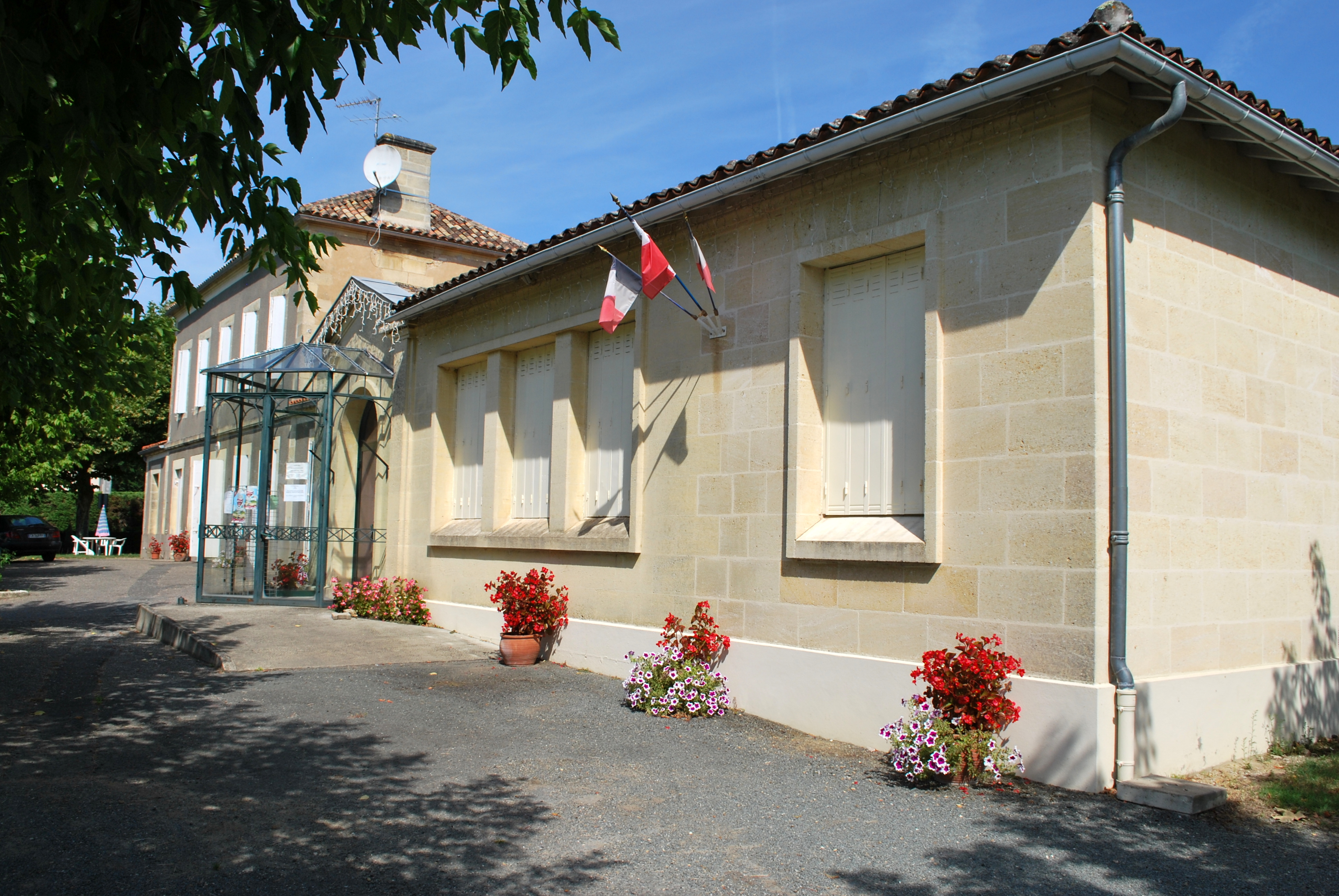
- The town hall in Saint-Étienne-de-Lisse
- Location of Saint-Étienne-de-Lisse
- Location within France Location within Nouvelle-Aquitaine
- Coordinates: 44°52′48″N 0°05′46″W
- Country: France
- Region: Nouvelle-Aquitaine
- Department: Gironde
- Arrondissement: Libourne
- Canton: Les Coteaux de Dordogne
- Intercommunality: Grand Saint-Émilionnais

Government
  - Mayor (2020–2026): Françoise Decamps
- Area^{1}: 7.09 km^{2} (2.74 sq mi)
- Elevation: 15 m (49 ft)
- Highest elevation: 91 m (299 ft)
- Lowest elevation: 11 m (36 ft)
- Population (2023): 180
  - Density: 25/km^{2} (66/sq mi)
- Time zone: UTC+01:00 (CET)
  - Summer (DST): UTC+02:00 (CEST)
- INSEE/Postal code: 33396 /33330
- ^{1} French Land Register data, which excludes lakes, ponds, glaciers > 1 km^{2} (0.386 sq mi or 247 acres) and river estuaries.

Saint-Étienne-de-Lisse (French pronunciation: [sɛ̃.t‿etjɛn də lis]; Occitan: Sent Estèfe de Liça) is a commune in the Gironde department in Nouvelle-Aquitaine in southwestern France.

== Population ==
Historical population
Year	Pop.	±% p.a.
1968	453	—
1975	465	+0.37%
1982	421	−1.41%
1990	387	−1.05%
1999	355	−0.95%
2007	293	−2.37%
2012	266	−1.91%
2017	231	−2.78%
2023	180	−4.07%
Source: INSEE

== See also ==
- Communes of the Gironde department
