= Coubeyrac =

- Commune
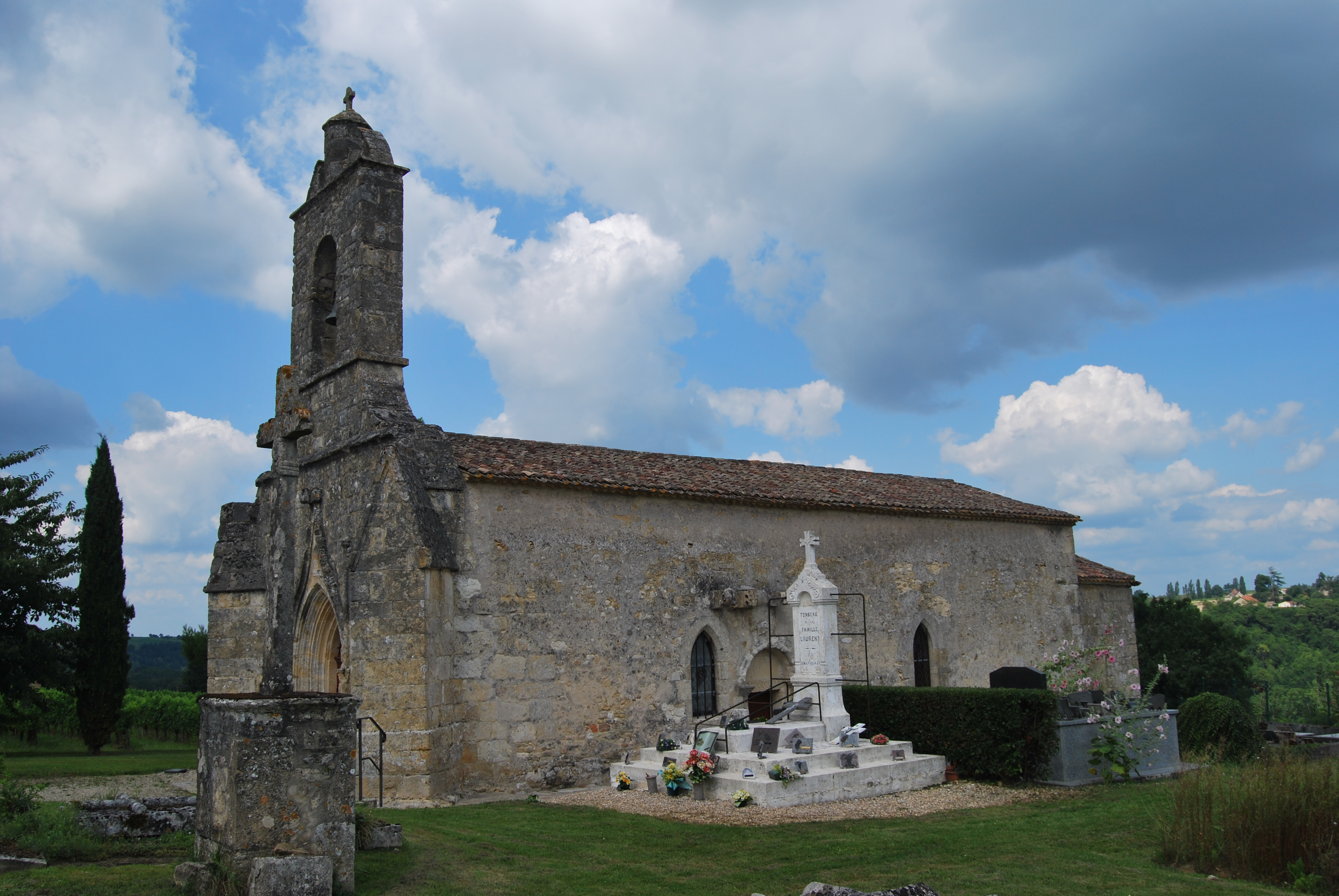
- The church in Coubeyrac
- Location of Coubeyrac
- Location within France Location within Nouvelle-Aquitaine
- Coordinates: 44°47′09″N 0°03′37″E
- Country: France
- Region: Nouvelle-Aquitaine
- Department: Gironde
- Arrondissement: Libourne
- Canton: Les Coteaux de Dordogne
- Intercommunality: Castillon-Pujols

Government
  - Mayor (2020–2026): Michel Géromin
- Area^{1}: 5.61 km^{2} (2.17 sq mi)
- Elevation: 75 m (246 ft)
- Highest elevation: 113 m (371 ft)
- Lowest elevation: 22 m (72 ft)
- Population (2023): 74
  - Density: 13/km^{2} (34/sq mi)
- Time zone: UTC+01:00 (CET)
  - Summer (DST): UTC+02:00 (CEST)
- INSEE/Postal code: 33133 /33890
- ^{1} French Land Register data, which excludes lakes, ponds, glaciers > 1 km^{2} (0.386 sq mi or 247 acres) and river estuaries.

Coubeyrac (French pronunciation: [kubeʁˈak]; Occitan: Cobeirac) is a commune in the Gironde department in Nouvelle-Aquitaine in southwestern France.

== Population ==
Historical population
Year	Pop.	±% p.a.
1968	139	—
1975	96	−5.15%
1982	95	−0.15%
1990	108	+1.62%
1999	106	−0.21%
2007	105	−0.12%
2012	96	−1.78%
2017	71	−5.85%
2023	74	+0.69%
Source: INSEE

== See also ==
- Communes of the Gironde department
