= Saint-Magne-de-Castillon =

- Commune
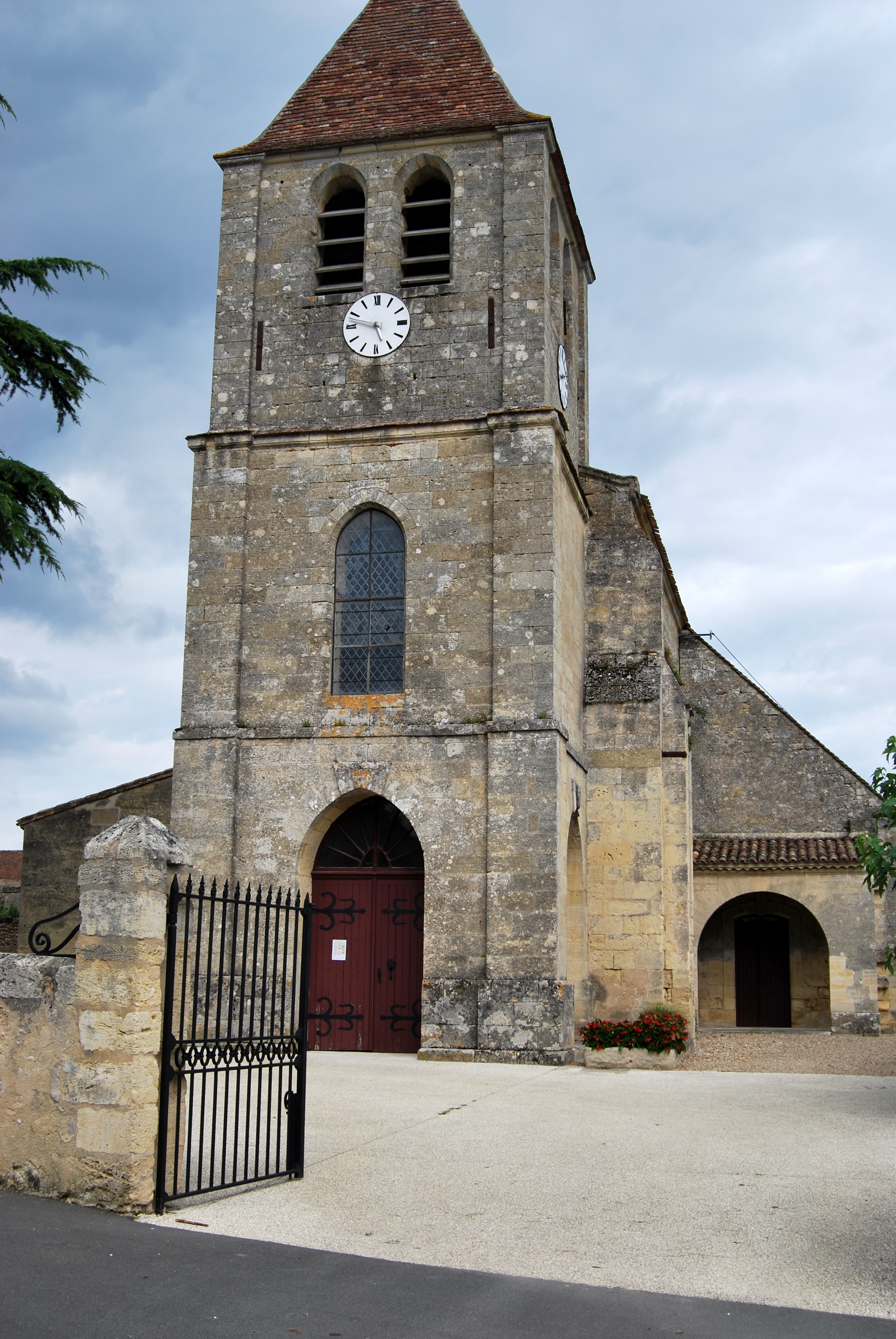
- The church in Saint-Magne-de-Castillon
- Location of Saint-Magne-de-Castillon
- Location within France Location within Nouvelle-Aquitaine
- Coordinates: 44°51′54″N 0°03′50″W
- Country: France
- Region: Nouvelle-Aquitaine
- Department: Gironde
- Arrondissement: Libourne
- Canton: Les Coteaux de Dordogne
- Intercommunality: Castillon-Pujols

Government
  - Mayor (2020–2026): Jean-Claude Delongeas
- Area^{1}: 13.87 km^{2} (5.36 sq mi)
- Elevation: 21 m (69 ft)
- Highest elevation: 96 m (315 ft)
- Lowest elevation: 1 m (3.3 ft)
- Population (2023): 2,165
  - Density: 156.1/km^{2} (404.3/sq mi)
- Time zone: UTC+01:00 (CET)
  - Summer (DST): UTC+02:00 (CEST)
- INSEE/Postal code: 33437 /33350
- ^{1} French Land Register data, which excludes lakes, ponds, glaciers > 1 km^{2} (0.386 sq mi or 247 acres) and river estuaries.

Saint-Magne-de-Castillon (French pronunciation: [sɛ̃ maɲ də kastijɔ̃], literally Saint-Magne of Castillon; Occitan: Sent Manhe de Castilhon) is a commune in the Gironde department in Nouvelle-Aquitaine in southwestern France.

== Population ==
Historical population
Year	Pop.	±% p.a.
1968	1,275	—
1975	1,455	+1.90%
1982	1,531	+0.73%
1990	1,640	+0.86%
1999	1,757	+0.77%
2007	1,787	+0.21%
2012	1,917	+1.41%
2017	1,998	+0.83%
2023	2,165	+1.35%
Source: INSEE

== See also ==
- Communes of the Gironde department
