= Saint-Pey-d'Armens =

- Commune
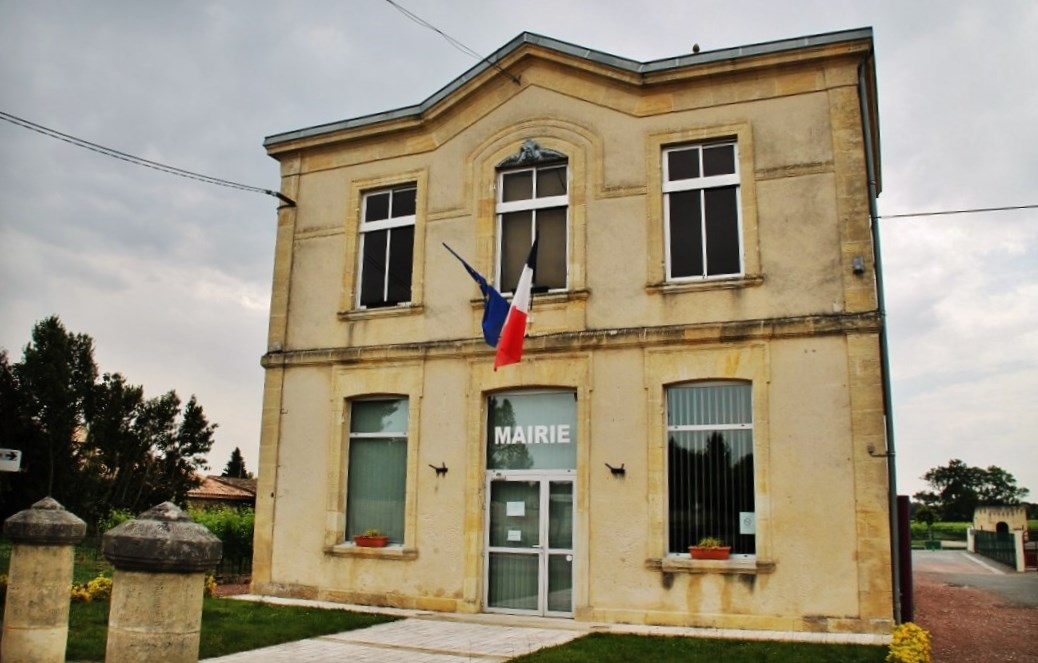
- The town hall in Saint-Pey-d'Armens
- Location of Saint-Pey-d'Armens
- Location within France Location within Nouvelle-Aquitaine
- Coordinates: 44°51′23″N 0°06′44″W
- Country: France
- Region: Nouvelle-Aquitaine
- Department: Gironde
- Arrondissement: Libourne
- Canton: Les Coteaux de Dordogne
- Intercommunality: Grand Saint-Émilionnais

Government
  - Mayor (2020–2026): Véronique Marchive
- Area^{1}: 4.2 km^{2} (1.6 sq mi)
- Elevation: 11 m (36 ft)
- Highest elevation: 16 m (52 ft)
- Lowest elevation: 6 m (20 ft)
- Population (2023): 187
  - Density: 45/km^{2} (120/sq mi)
- Time zone: UTC+01:00 (CET)
  - Summer (DST): UTC+02:00 (CEST)
- INSEE/Postal code: 33459 /33330
- ^{1} French Land Register data, which excludes lakes, ponds, glaciers > 1 km^{2} (0.386 sq mi or 247 acres) and river estuaries.

Saint-Pey-d'Armens is a commune in the Gironde department in Nouvelle-Aquitaine in southwestern France.

== Population ==
Historical population
Year	Pop.	±% p.a.
1968	393	—
1975	343	−1.93%
1982	316	−1.16%
1990	304	−0.48%
1999	276	−1.07%
2007	264	−0.55%
2012	231	−2.64%
2017	196	−3.23%
2023	187	−0.78%
Source: INSEE

== See also ==
- Communes of the Gironde department
