= Canton of Les Coteaux de Dordogne =

Administrative division of Gironde, France

Coordinates: 44.86°N 0.04°W

Les Coteaux de Dordogne
- Canton
- A map of the canton of Les Coteaux de Dordogne in the Gironde department.
- Country: France
- Region: Nouvelle-Aquitaine
- Department: Gironde
- No. of communes: {{{nbcomm}}}
- INSEE code: 33

The canton of Les Coteaux de Dordogne (French: Canton des Coteaux de Dordogne) is a canton (an administrative division) of the Gironde department, Southwestern France. It was created at the canton reorganisation that came into effect in March 2015. Its seat is Castillon-la-Bataille. It elects two members of the Departmental Council of Gironde.

== Composition ==
It consists of the following communes:

1. Baron
2. Belvès-de-Castillon
3. Bossugan
4. Branne
5. Cabara
6. Camiac-et-Saint-Denis
7. Castillon-la-Bataille
8. Civrac-sur-Dordogne
9. Coubeyrac
10. Daignac
11. Dardenac
12. Doulezon
13. Espiet
14. Flaujagues
15. Gardegan-et-Tourtirac
16. Génissac
17. Gensac
18. Grézillac
19. Guillac
20. Jugazan
21. Juillac
22. Lugaignac
23. Mouliets-et-Villemartin
24. Moulon
25. Naujan-et-Postiac
26. Nérigean
27. Pessac-sur-Dordogne
28. Pujols
29. Rauzan
30. Saint-Aubin-de-Branne
31. Sainte-Colombe
32. Sainte-Florence
33. Saint-Émilion
34. Sainte-Radegonde
35. Sainte-Terre
36. Saint-Étienne-de-Lisse
37. Saint-Genès-de-Castillon
38. Saint-Germain-du-Puch
39. Saint-Hippolyte
40. Saint-Jean-de-Blaignac
41. Saint-Laurent-des-Combes
42. Saint-Magne-de-Castillon
43. Saint-Pey-d'Armens
44. Saint-Pey-de-Castets
45. Saint-Philippe-d'Aiguille
46. Saint-Quentin-de-Baron
47. Saint-Sulpice-de-Faleyrens
48. Saint-Vincent-de-Pertignas
49. Les Salles-de-Castillon
50. Tizac-de-Curton
51. Vignonet
