= Saint-Philippe-d'Aiguille =

- Commune
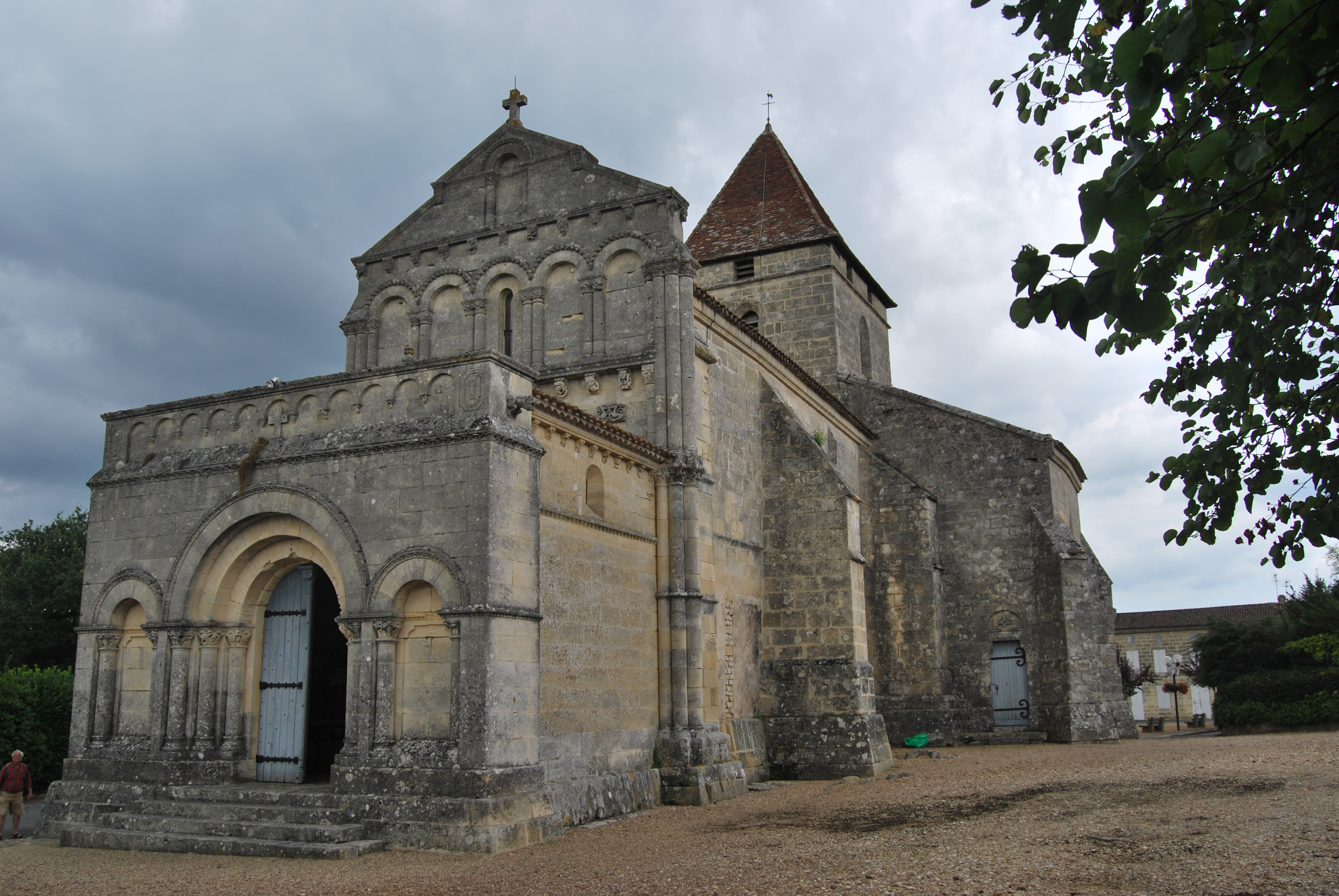
- The church in Saint-Philippe-d'Aiguille
- Location of Saint-Philippe-d'Aiguille
- Location within France Location within Nouvelle-Aquitaine
- Coordinates: 44°54′51″N 0°01′47″W
- Country: France
- Region: Nouvelle-Aquitaine
- Department: Gironde
- Arrondissement: Libourne
- Canton: Les Coteaux de Dordogne

Government
  - Mayor (2020–2026): Philippe Becheau
- Area^{1}: 5.87 km^{2} (2.27 sq mi)
- Elevation: 107 m (351 ft)
- Highest elevation: 117 m (384 ft)
- Lowest elevation: 38 m (125 ft)
- Population (2023): 376
  - Density: 64.1/km^{2} (166/sq mi)
- Time zone: UTC+01:00 (CET)
  - Summer (DST): UTC+02:00 (CEST)
- INSEE/Postal code: 33461 /33350
- ^{1} French Land Register data, which excludes lakes, ponds, glaciers > 1 km^{2} (0.386 sq mi or 247 acres) and river estuaries.

Saint-Philippe-d'Aiguille (French pronunciation: [sɛ̃ filip dɛɡɥij]; Occitan: Sent Filipe d'Aguilha) is a commune in the Gironde department in Nouvelle-Aquitaine in southwestern France.

== Population ==
Historical population
Year	Pop.	±% p.a.
1968	364	—
1975	386	+0.84%
1982	353	−1.27%
1990	394	+1.38%
1999	424	+0.82%
2007	425	+0.03%
2012	404	−1.01%
2017	374	−1.53%
2023	376	+0.09%
Source: INSEE

== See also ==
- Communes of the Gironde department
