= Flaujagues =

- Commune
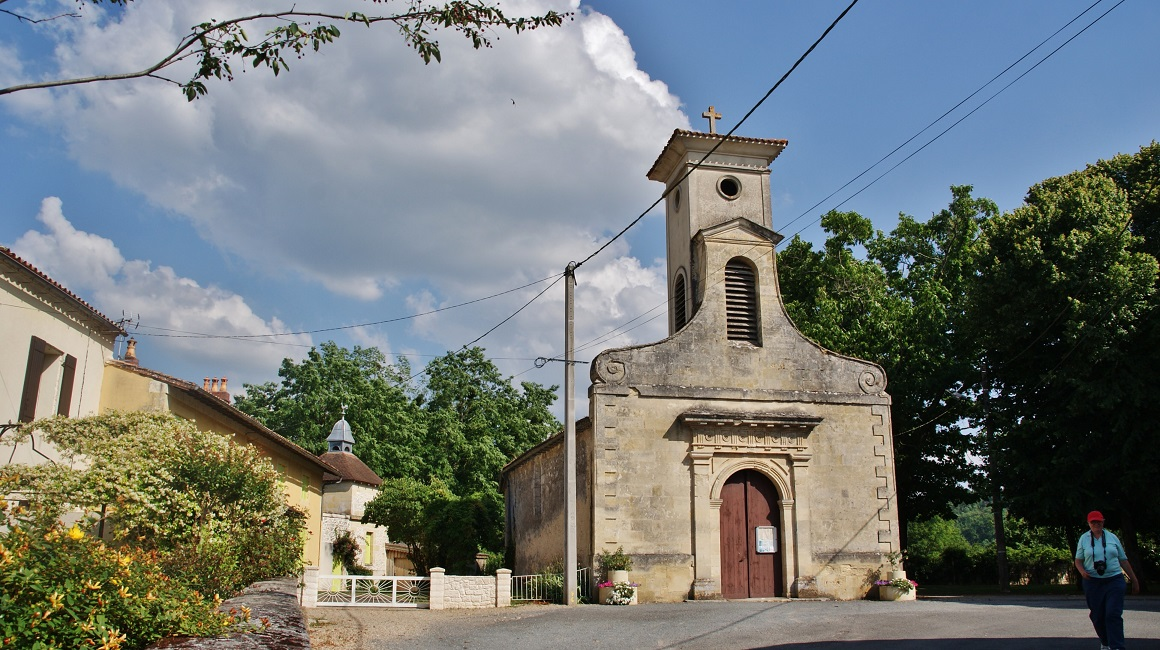
- The church in Flaujagues

- Coat of arms
- Location of Flaujagues
- Location within France Location within Nouvelle-Aquitaine
- Coordinates: 44°49′42″N 0°02′14″E
- Country: France
- Region: Nouvelle-Aquitaine
- Department: Gironde
- Arrondissement: Libourne
- Canton: Les Coteaux de Dordogne
- Intercommunality: Castillon Pujols

Government
  - Mayor (2020–2026): Viviane Duval
- Area^{1}: 7.8 km^{2} (3.0 sq mi)
- Elevation: 8 m (26 ft)
- Highest elevation: 84 m (276 ft)
- Lowest elevation: 2 m (6.6 ft)
- Population (2023): 594
  - Density: 76/km^{2} (200/sq mi)
- Time zone: UTC+01:00 (CET)
  - Summer (DST): UTC+02:00 (CEST)
- INSEE/Postal code: 33168 /33350
- ^{1} French Land Register data, which excludes lakes, ponds, glaciers > 1 km^{2} (0.386 sq mi or 247 acres) and river estuaries.

Flaujagues (French pronunciation: [floʒaɡ]; Occitan: Flaujagas) is a commune in the Gironde department in Nouvelle-Aquitaine in southwestern France.

== Population ==
Historical population
| Year | Pop. | ±% p.a. |
|---|---|---|
| 1968 | 488 | — |
| 1975 | 418 | −2.19% |
| 1982 | 462 | +1.44% |
| 1990 | 466 | +0.11% |
| 1999 | 490 | +0.56% |
| 2007 | 523 | +0.82% |
| 2012 | 595 | +2.61% |
| 2017 | 591 | −0.13% |
| 2023 | 594 | +0.08% |
Source: INSEE

== See also ==
- Communes of the Gironde department
