= Baron, Gironde =

Baron
- Commune
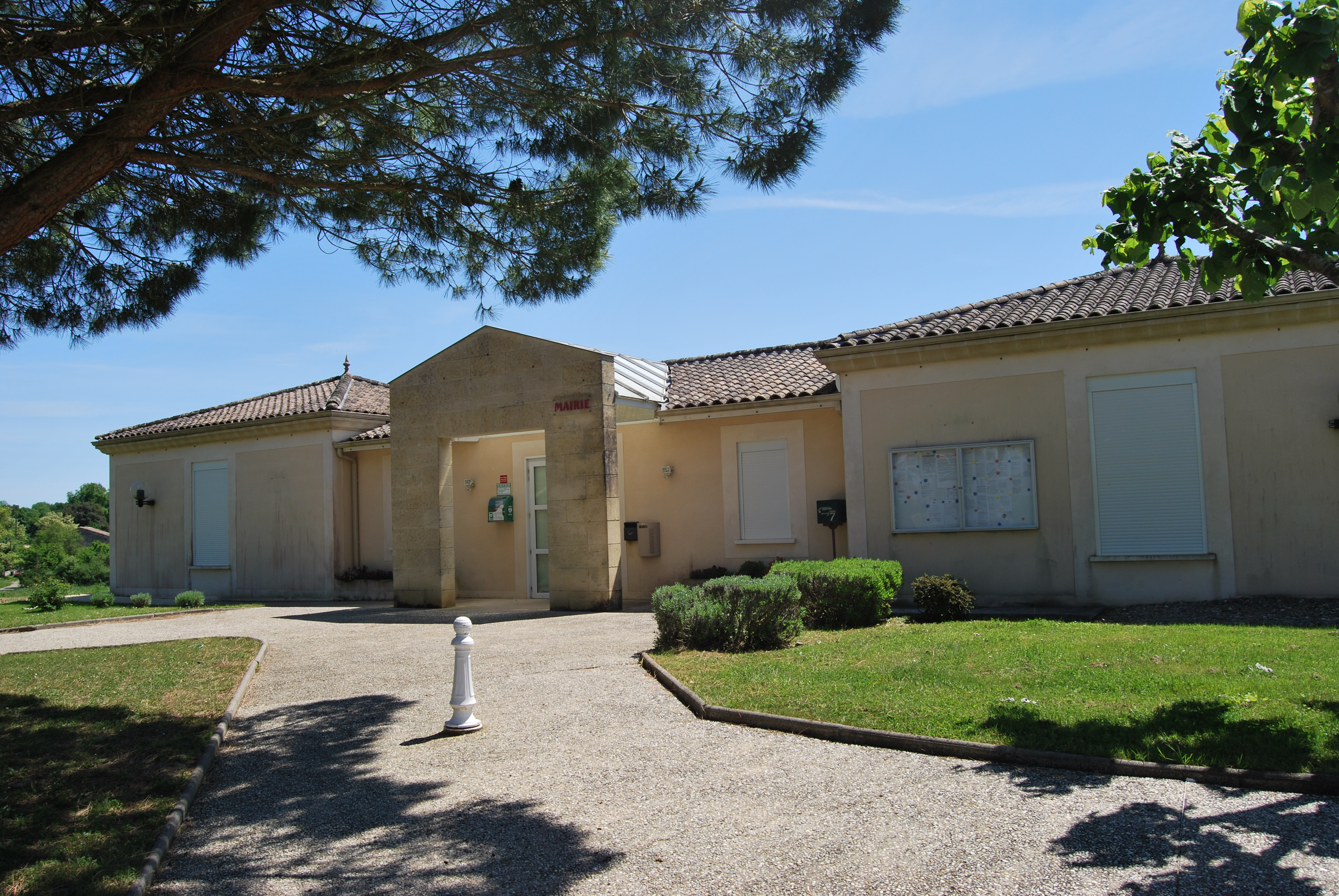
- The town hall in Baron

- Coat of arms
- Location of Baron
- Location within France Location within Nouvelle-Aquitaine
- Coordinates: 44°49′23″N 0°18′41″W
- Country: France
- Region: Nouvelle-Aquitaine
- Department: Gironde
- Arrondissement: Libourne
- Canton: Les Coteaux de Dordogne
- Intercommunality: Créonnais

Government
  - Mayor (2020–2026): Emmanuel Le Blond Du Plouy
- Area^{1}: 10.34 km^{2} (3.99 sq mi)
- Elevation: 82 m (269 ft)
- Highest elevation: 108 m (354 ft)
- Lowest elevation: 29 m (95 ft)
- Population (2023): 1,218
  - Density: 117.8/km^{2} (305.1/sq mi)
- Time zone: UTC+01:00 (CET)
  - Summer (DST): UTC+02:00 (CEST)
- INSEE/Postal code: 33028 /33750
- ^{1} French Land Register data, which excludes lakes, ponds, glaciers > 1 km^{2} (0.386 sq mi or 247 acres) and river estuaries.

Baron (French pronunciation: [baʁˈɔ̃]) is a commune in the Gironde department in southwestern France.

== Population ==
Historical population
Year	Pop.	±% p.a.
1968	503	—
1975	527	+0.67%
1982	668	+3.44%
1990	749	+1.44%
1999	866	+1.63%
2007	935	+0.96%
2012	1,140	+4.04%
2017	1,153	+0.23%
2023	1,218	+0.92%
Source: INSEE

== See also ==
- Communes of the Gironde department
