= Fronsac AOC =

Fronsac
- Wine region
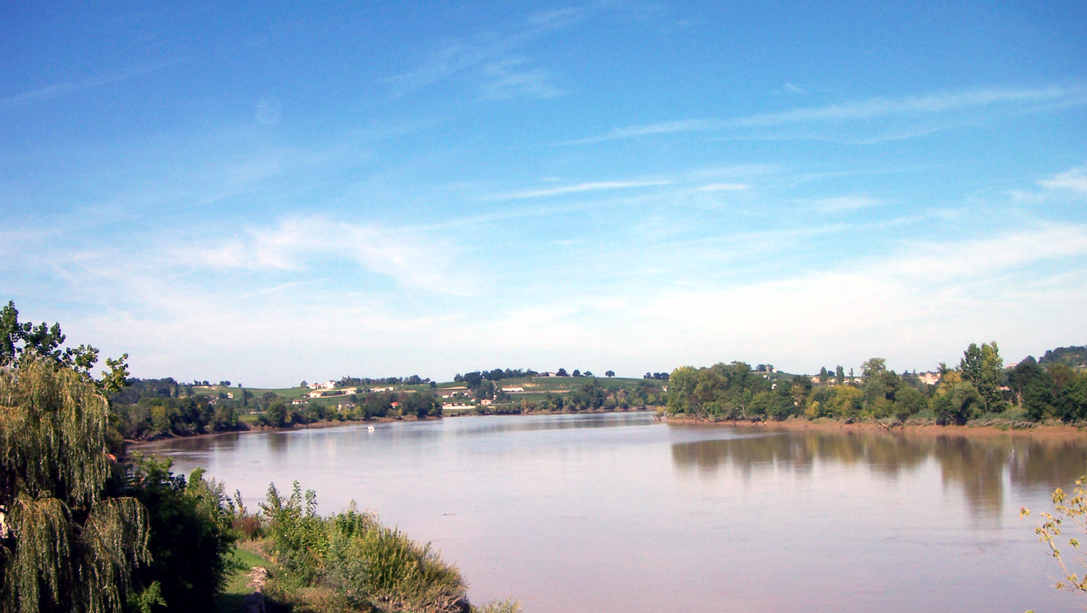
- The river Dordogne with the hills of Canon Fronsac in background
- Type: Appellation d'origine contrôlée
- Country: France
- Part of: The Libournais, Bordeaux Right bank
- Soil conditions: Alluvial clay and chalk
- Varietals produced: Merlot, Cabernet Franc, Cabernet Sauvignon

Fronsac (French pronunciation: [fʁɔ̃sak]) is a wine growing region named after the commune of Fronsac on the right bank of the Gironde estuary in Bordeaux. It includes the following communes: La Rivière, St.-Germain-la-Rivière, St.-Aignan, Saillans, St.Michel-de-Fronsac, Galgon, and Fronsac. Canon Fronsac AOC is a sub-appellation contained entirely within Fronsac AOC in the southern area nearest the river Dordogne.

The AOC produces red wines only, which are based primarily on Merlot. The major grape varieties grown, with approximate acreage given in parentheses, are Merlot (almost 80%), Cabernet Franc (almost 15%), and Cabernet Sauvignon (under 10%). The appellation covers 771 ha, with approximately 100 winemakers producing 5 million bottles per year.
