= Fronsac =

Fronsac is the name or part of the name of the following communes in France:

- Fronsac, Gironde, in the Gironde department
- Fronsac, Haute-Garonne, in the Haute-Garonne department
- La Lande-de-Fronsac, in the Gironde department
- Saint-Genès-de-Fronsac, in the Gironde department
- Saint-Michel-de-Fronsac, in the Gironde department
