= Saint-Seurin =

Saint-Seurin may refer to:

Places

- Saint-Seurin-de-Palenne, Charente-Maritime
- Saint-Seurin-de-Bourg, Gironde
- Saint-Seurin-de-Cadourne, Gironde
- Saint-Seurin-de-Prats, Dordogne
- Saint-Seurin-sur-l'Isle, Gironde
- Saint-Seurin-de-Cursac, Gironde

Churches

- Basilique Saint-Seurin de Bordeaux, Bordeaux
- Église Saint-Seurin, Gabarnac
- Église Saint-Seurin, Galgon
- Église Saint-Seurin, Lamarque
- Église Saint-Seurin, Rions
- Église Saint-Seurin, Saillans

== See also ==
- Severinus of Bordeaux
- Chenac-Saint-Seurin-d'Uzet
- Football Club Libourne
