= Saillans =

Saillans is the name of several communes in France:

- Saillans, Drôme, in the Drôme department
- Saillans, Gironde, in the Gironde department
