= Mouillac =

Mouillac may refer to the following places in France:

- Mouillac, Gironde, a commune in the Gironde department
- Mouillac, Tarn-et-Garonne, a commune in the Tarn-et-Garonne department
