= Cadarsac =

- Commune
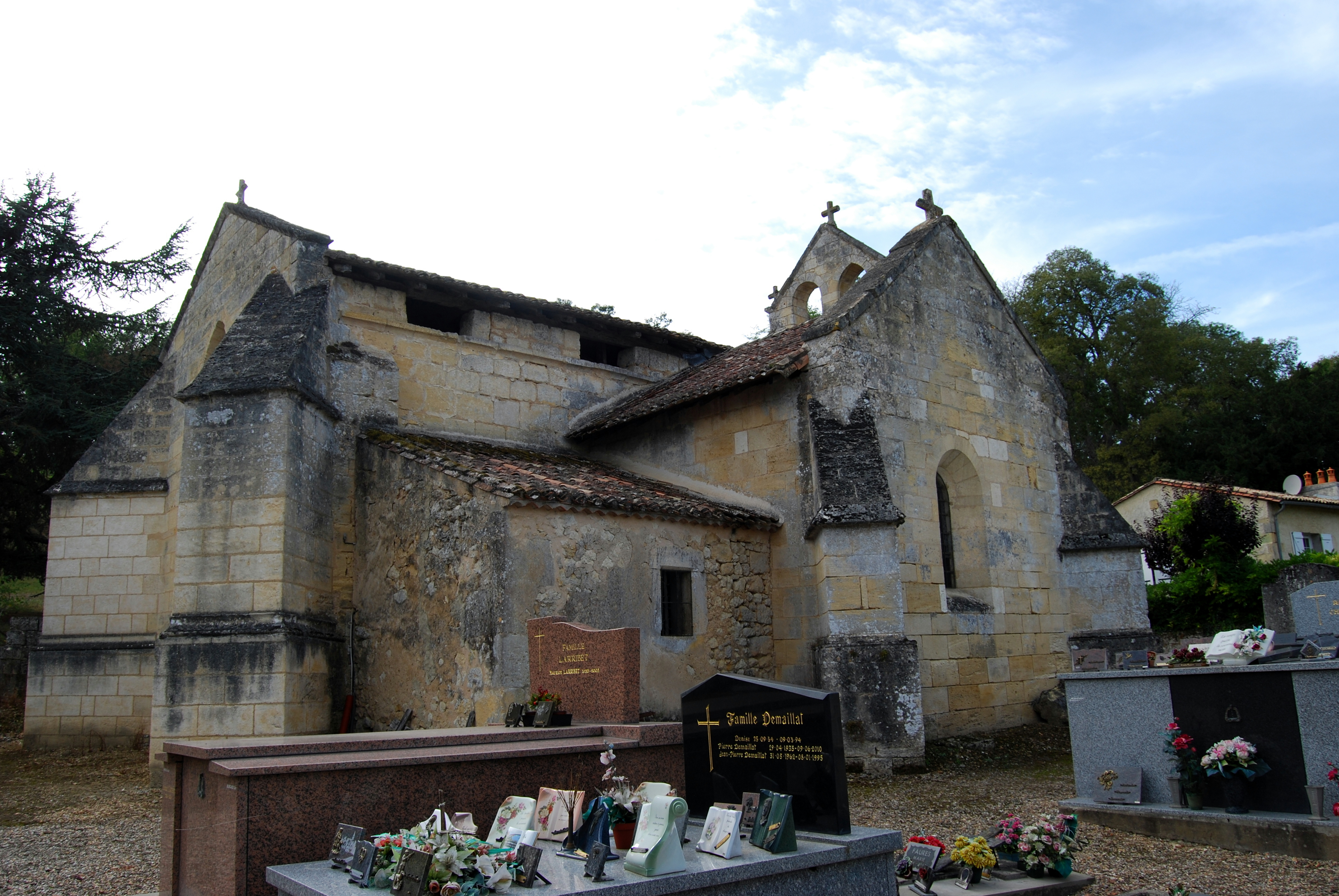
- The church in Cadarsac

- Coat of arms
- Location of Cadarsac
- Location within France Location within Nouvelle-Aquitaine
- Coordinates: 44°51′41″N 0°17′06″W
- Country: France
- Region: Nouvelle-Aquitaine
- Department: Gironde
- Arrondissement: Libourne
- Canton: Le Libournais-Fronsadais
- Intercommunality: CA Libournais

Government
  - Mayor (2020–2026): Joachim Boisard
- Area^{1}: 2.3 km^{2} (0.89 sq mi)
- Elevation: 50 m (160 ft)
- Highest elevation: 53 m (174 ft)
- Lowest elevation: 2 m (6.6 ft)
- Population (2023): 342
  - Density: 150/km^{2} (390/sq mi)
- Time zone: UTC+01:00 (CET)
  - Summer (DST): UTC+02:00 (CEST)
- INSEE/Postal code: 33079 /33750
- ^{1} French Land Register data, which excludes lakes, ponds, glaciers > 1 km^{2} (0.386 sq mi or 247 acres) and river estuaries.

Cadarsac (French pronunciation: [kadaʁsˈak]; Occitan: Cadarçac) is a commune in the Gironde department in Nouvelle-Aquitaine in southwestern France.

== Population ==
Historical population
Year	Pop.	±% p.a.
1968	135	—
1975	141	+0.62%
1982	184	+3.88%
1990	263	+4.57%
1999	246	−0.74%
2007	227	−1.00%
2012	305	+6.09%
2017	357	+3.20%
2023	342	−0.71%
Source: INSEE

== See also ==
- Communes of the Gironde department
