= Villegouge =

- Commune
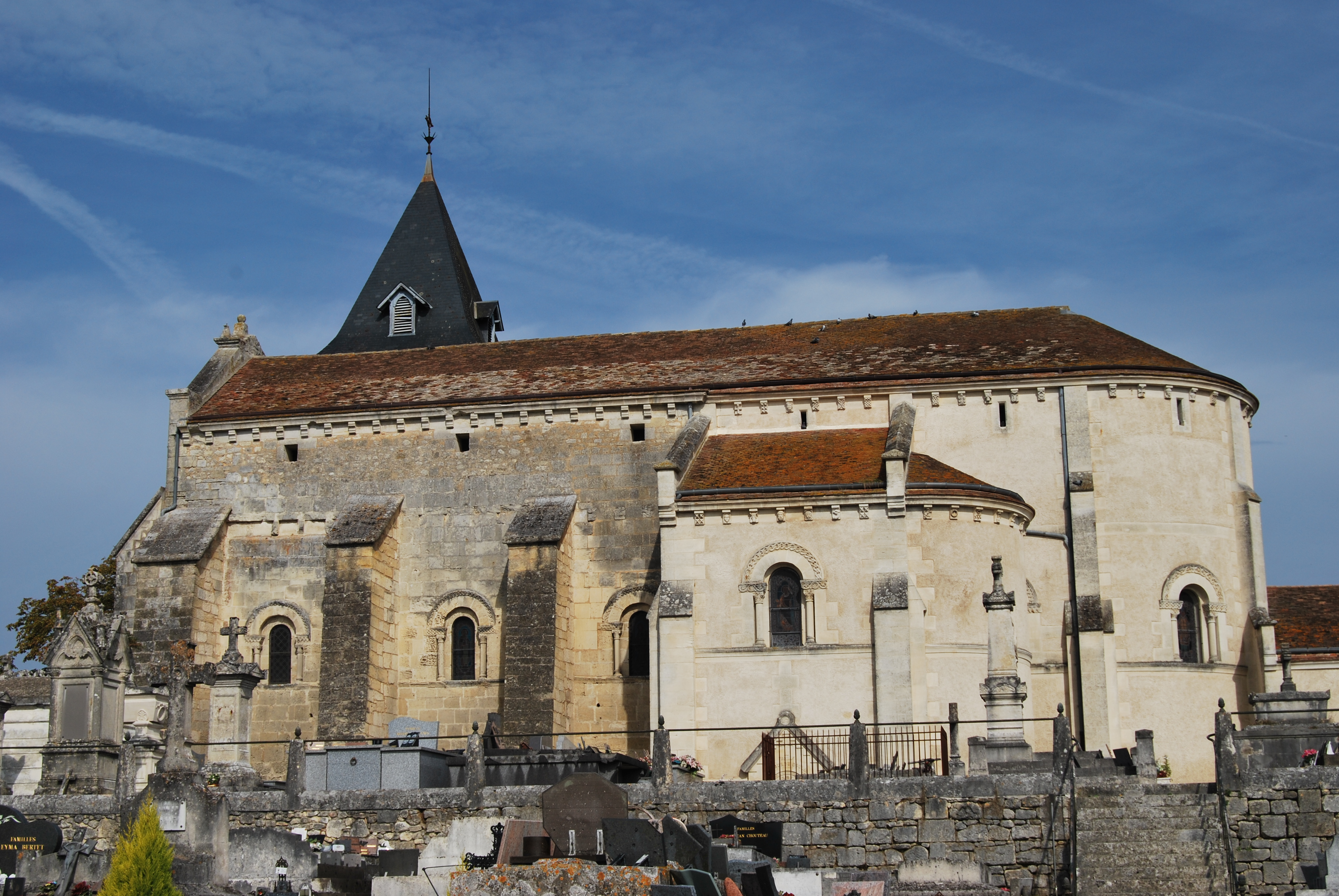
- The church in Villegouge
- Location of Villegouge
- Location within France Location within Nouvelle-Aquitaine
- Coordinates: 44°58′05″N 0°18′23″W
- Country: France
- Region: Nouvelle-Aquitaine
- Department: Gironde
- Arrondissement: Libourne
- Canton: Le Libournais-Fronsadais
- Intercommunality: Fronsadais

Government
  - Mayor (2020–2026): Guillaume Valeix
- Area^{1}: 13.84 km^{2} (5.34 sq mi)
- Elevation: 30 m (98 ft)
- Highest elevation: 81 m (266 ft)
- Lowest elevation: 11 m (36 ft)
- Population (2023): 1,325
  - Density: 95.74/km^{2} (248.0/sq mi)
- Time zone: UTC+01:00 (CET)
  - Summer (DST): UTC+02:00 (CEST)
- INSEE/Postal code: 33548 /33141
- ^{1} French Land Register data, which excludes lakes, ponds, glaciers > 1 km^{2} (0.386 sq mi or 247 acres) and river estuaries.

Villegouge (French pronunciation: [vilɡuʒ]; Occitan: Vilagoja) is a commune in the Gironde department in Nouvelle-Aquitaine in southwestern France.

== Population ==
Historical population
Year	Pop.	±% p.a.
1968	715	—
1975	773	+1.12%
1982	968	+3.27%
1990	1,100	+1.61%
1999	1,107	+0.07%
2007	1,177	+0.77%
2012	1,253	+1.26%
2017	1,263	+0.16%
2023	1,325	+0.80%
Source: INSEE

== See also ==
- Communes of the Gironde department
