= Dardenac =

- Commune
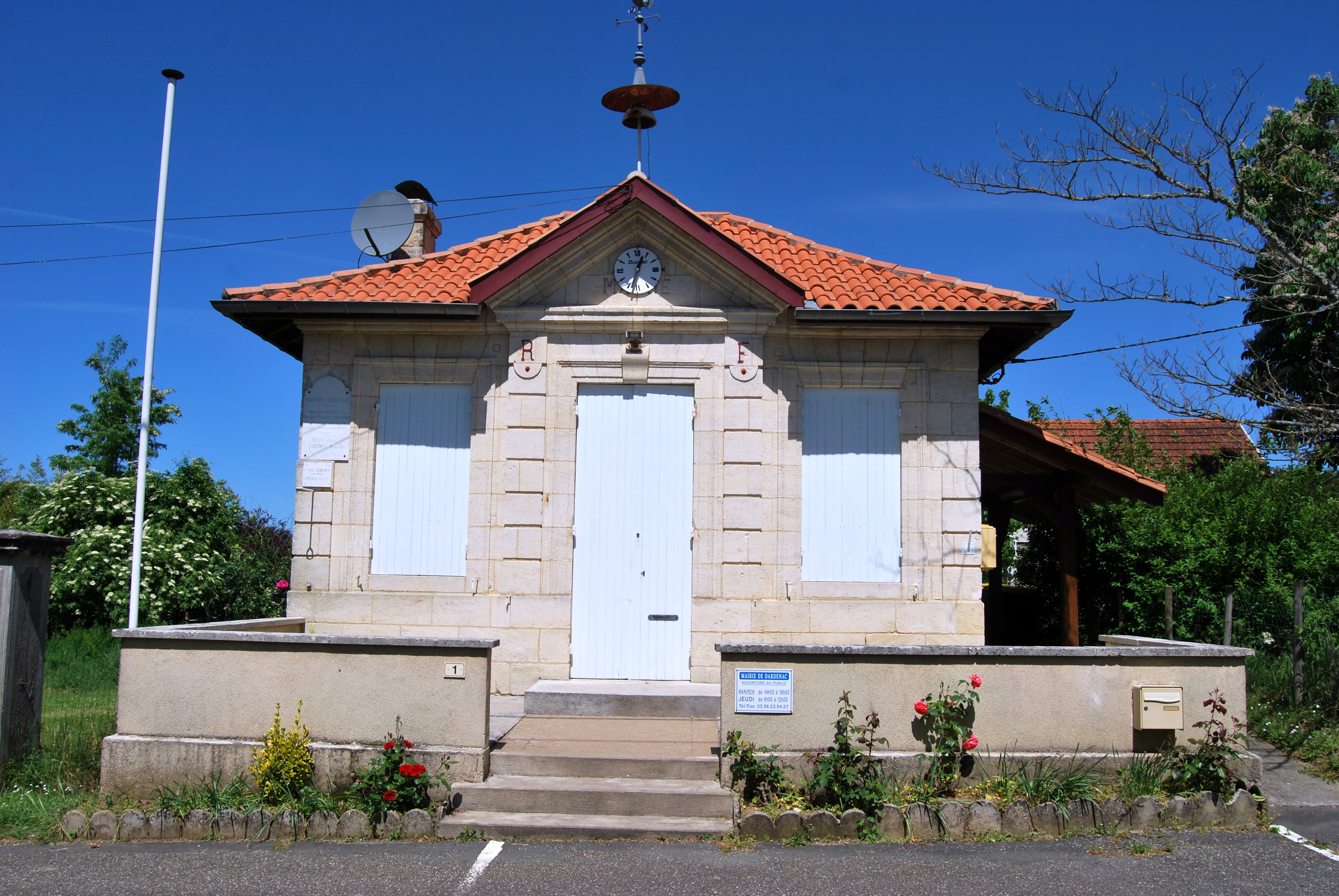
- The town hall in Dardenac

- Coat of arms
- Location of Dardenac
- Location within France Location within Nouvelle-Aquitaine
- Coordinates: 44°47′06″N 0°14′29″W
- Country: France
- Region: Nouvelle-Aquitaine
- Department: Gironde
- Arrondissement: Libourne
- Canton: Les Coteaux de Dordogne
- Intercommunality: CA Libournais

Government
  - Mayor (2020–2026): Odile Lumino
- Area^{1}: 1.5 km^{2} (0.58 sq mi)
- Elevation: 77 m (253 ft)
- Highest elevation: 86 m (282 ft)
- Lowest elevation: 33 m (108 ft)
- Population (2023): 98
  - Density: 65/km^{2} (170/sq mi)
- Time zone: UTC+01:00 (CET)
  - Summer (DST): UTC+02:00 (CEST)
- INSEE/Postal code: 33148 /33420
- ^{1} French Land Register data, which excludes lakes, ponds, glaciers > 1 km^{2} (0.386 sq mi or 247 acres) and river estuaries.

Dardenac (French pronunciation: [daʁdənak]) is a commune in the Gironde department in southwestern France.

== Population ==
Historical population
Year	Pop.	±% p.a.
1968	61	—
1975	57	−0.96%
1982	67	+2.34%
1990	60	−1.37%
1999	59	−0.19%
2007	90	+5.42%
2012	90	+0.00%
2017	85	−1.14%
2023	98	+2.40%
Source: INSEE

== See also ==
- Communes of the Gironde department
