= Saint-Romain-la-Virvée =

- Commune
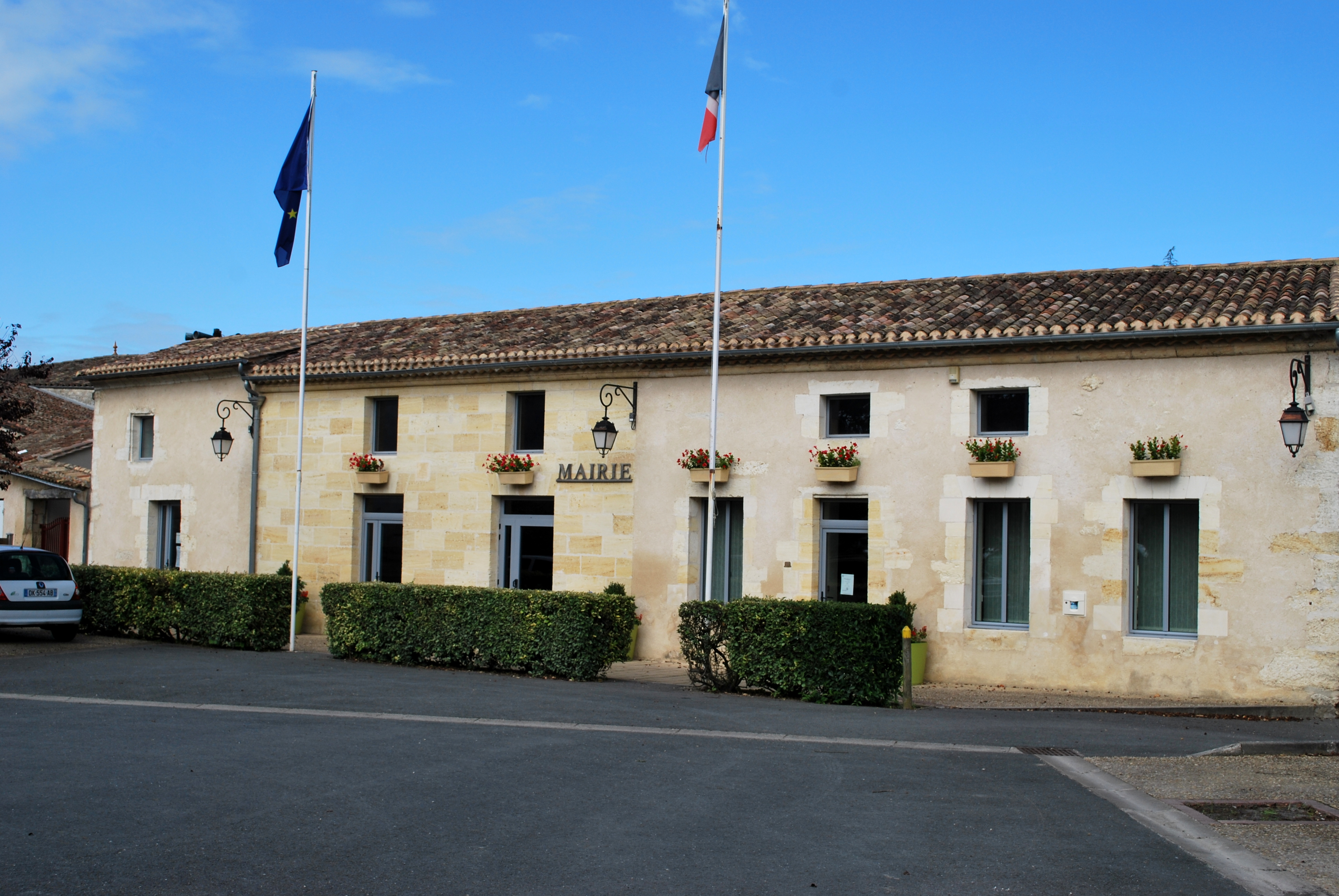
- The town hall in Saint-Romain-la-Virvée

- Coat of arms
- Location of Saint-Romain-la-Virvée
- Location within France Location within Nouvelle-Aquitaine
- Coordinates: 44°57′59″N 0°23′54″W
- Country: France
- Region: Nouvelle-Aquitaine
- Department: Gironde
- Arrondissement: Libourne
- Canton: Le Libournais-Fronsadais
- Intercommunality: Fronsadais

Government
  - Mayor (2020–2026): Alain Montion
- Area^{1}: 7.82 km^{2} (3.02 sq mi)
- Highest elevation: 63 m (207 ft)
- Lowest elevation: 2 m (6.6 ft)
- Population (2023): 956
  - Density: 122/km^{2} (317/sq mi)
- Time zone: UTC+01:00 (CET)
  - Summer (DST): UTC+02:00 (CEST)
- INSEE/Postal code: 33470 /33240
- ^{1} French Land Register data, which excludes lakes, ponds, glaciers > 1 km^{2} (0.386 sq mi or 247 acres) and river estuaries.

Saint-Romain-la-Virvée (Occitan: Sent Roman) is a commune in the Gironde department in Nouvelle-Aquitaine in southwestern France.

== Population ==
Historical population
Year	Pop.	±% p.a.
1968	441	—
1975	446	+0.16%
1982	715	+6.97%
1990	783	+1.14%
1999	755	−0.40%
2007	763	+0.13%
2012	799	+0.93%
2017	873	+1.79%
2023	956	+1.53%
Source: INSEE

== See also ==
- Communes of the Gironde department
