= Ligueux, Gironde =

Ligueux
- Commune
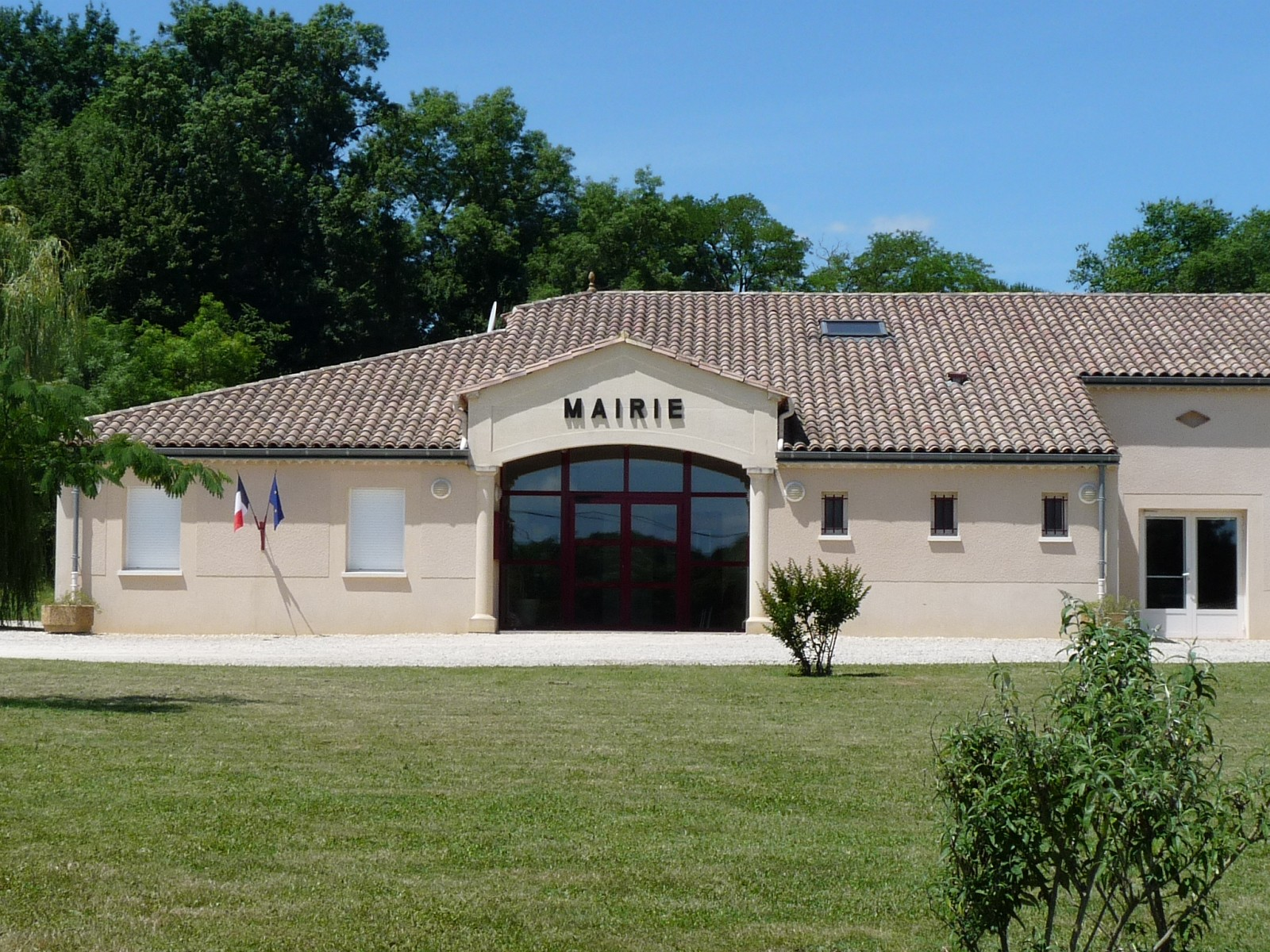
- The town hall in Ligueux

- Coat of arms
- Location of Ligueux
- Location within France Location within Nouvelle-Aquitaine
- Coordinates: 44°47′12″N 0°16′13″E
- Country: France
- Region: Nouvelle-Aquitaine
- Department: Gironde
- Arrondissement: Libourne
- Canton: Le Réolais et Les Bastides
- Intercommunality: Pays Foyen

Government
  - Mayor (2020–2026): Isabelle Pillon
- Area^{1}: 5.05 km^{2} (1.95 sq mi)
- Elevation: 82 m (269 ft)
- Highest elevation: 125 m (410 ft)
- Lowest elevation: 32 m (105 ft)
- Population (2023): 138
  - Density: 27.3/km^{2} (70.8/sq mi)
- Time zone: UTC+01:00 (CET)
  - Summer (DST): UTC+02:00 (CEST)
- INSEE/Postal code: 33246 /33220
- ^{1} French Land Register data, which excludes lakes, ponds, glaciers > 1 km^{2} (0.386 sq mi or 247 acres) and river estuaries.

Ligueux (French pronunciation: [liɡø]; Occitan: Ligüers) is a commune in the Gironde department in Nouvelle-Aquitaine in southwestern France.

== Population ==
Historical population
Year	Pop.	±% p.a.
1968	105	—
1975	100	−0.69%
1982	121	+2.76%
1990	123	+0.21%
1999	158	+2.82%
2007	168	+0.77%
2012	171	+0.35%
2017	166	−0.59%
2023	138	−3.03%
Source: INSEE

== See also ==
- Communes of the Gironde department
