= Les Billaux =

- Commune
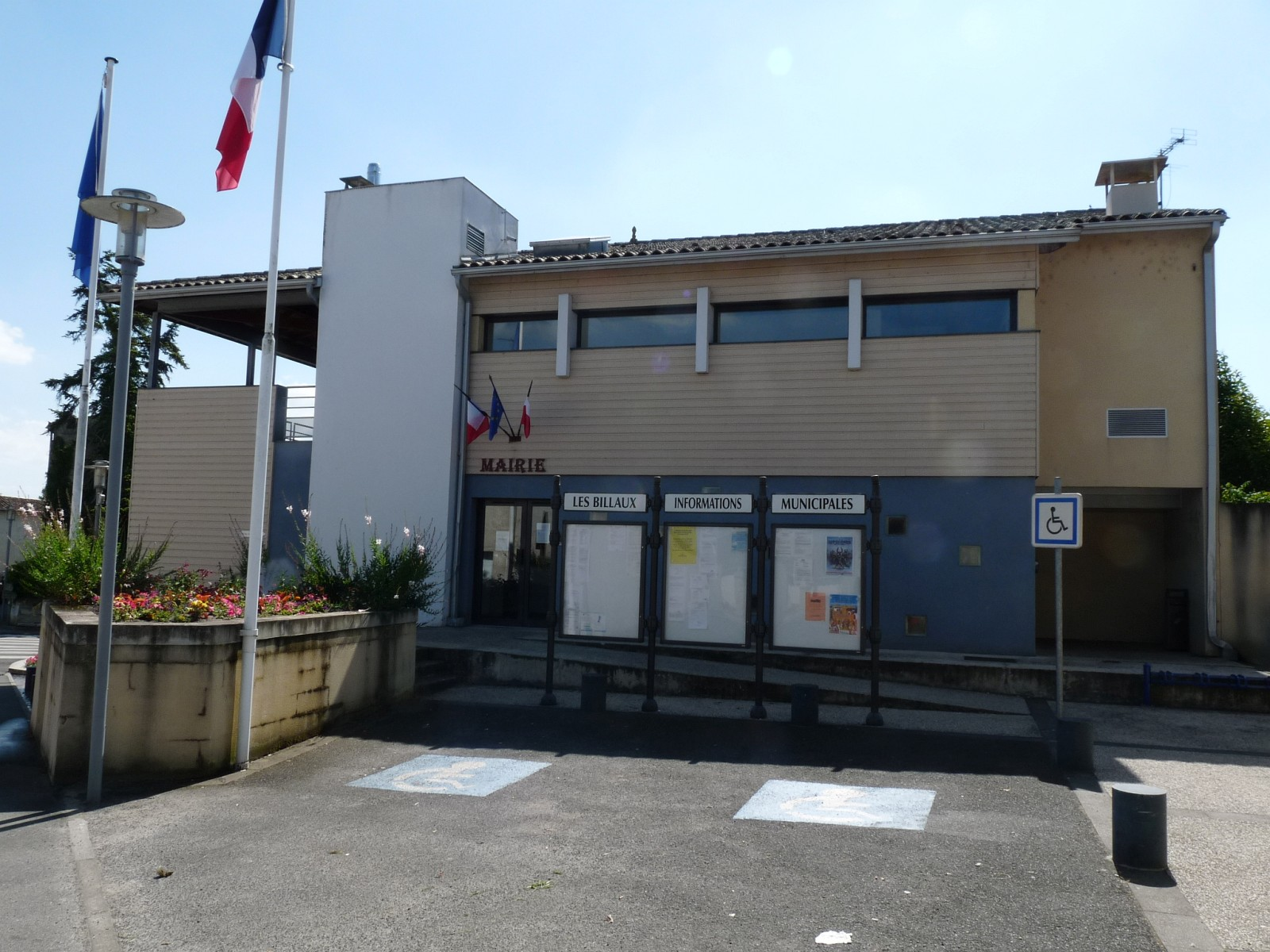
- The town hall in Les Billaux
- Location of Les Billaux
- Location within France Location within Nouvelle-Aquitaine
- Coordinates: 44°57′12″N 0°14′09″W
- Country: France
- Region: Nouvelle-Aquitaine
- Department: Gironde
- Arrondissement: Libourne
- Canton: Le Libournais-Fronsadais
- Intercommunality: CA Libournais

Government
  - Mayor (2020–2026): Michel Millaire
- Area^{1}: 6.26 km^{2} (2.42 sq mi)
- Elevation: 9 m (30 ft)
- Highest elevation: 16 m (52 ft)
- Lowest elevation: 2 m (6.6 ft)
- Population (2023): 1,174
  - Density: 188/km^{2} (486/sq mi)
- Time zone: UTC+01:00 (CET)
  - Summer (DST): UTC+02:00 (CEST)
- INSEE/Postal code: 33052 /33500
- ^{1} French Land Register data, which excludes lakes, ponds, glaciers > 1 km^{2} (0.386 sq mi or 247 acres) and river estuaries.

Les Billaux (French pronunciation: [le bijo]; Occitan: Lo Bolas) is a commune in the Gironde department in Nouvelle-Aquitaine in southwestern France.

== Population ==
Historical population
Year	Pop.	±% p.a.
1968	582	—
1975	721	+3.11%
1982	707	−0.28%
1990	809	+1.70%
1999	816	+0.10%
2007	987	+2.41%
2012	1,134	+2.82%
2017	1,191	+0.99%
2023	1,174	−0.24%
Source: INSEE

== See also ==
- Communes of the Gironde department
