= Asques, Gironde =

Asques
- Commune
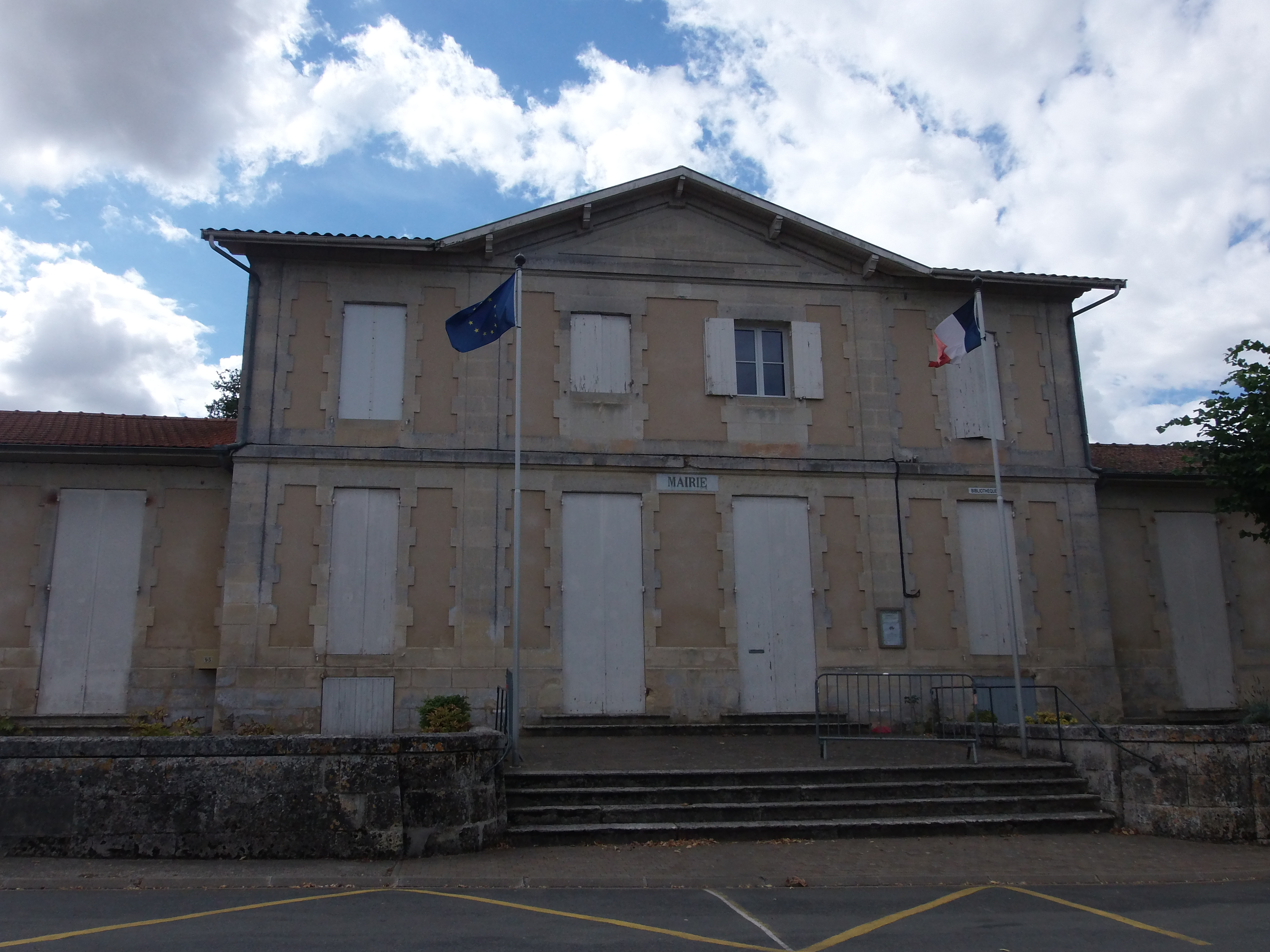
- The town hall in Asques
- Location of Asques
- Location within France Location within Nouvelle-Aquitaine
- Coordinates: 44°57′10″N 0°24′40″W
- Country: France
- Region: Nouvelle-Aquitaine
- Department: Gironde
- Arrondissement: Libourne
- Canton: Le Libournais-Fronsadais
- Intercommunality: CC Fronsadais

Government
  - Mayor (2020–2026): Murielle Darcos
- Area^{1}: 6.28 km^{2} (2.42 sq mi)
- Elevation: 5 m (16 ft)
- Highest elevation: 32 m (105 ft)
- Lowest elevation: 1 m (3.3 ft)
- Population (2023): 440
  - Density: 70/km^{2} (180/sq mi)
- Time zone: UTC+01:00 (CET)
  - Summer (DST): UTC+02:00 (CEST)
- INSEE/Postal code: 33016 /33240
- ^{1} French Land Register data, which excludes lakes, ponds, glaciers > 1 km^{2} (0.386 sq mi or 247 acres) and river estuaries.

Asques (French pronunciation: [ask]; Occitan: Ascas) is a commune in the Gironde department in southwestern France.

== Population ==
Historical population
Year	Pop.	±% p.a.
1968	378	—
1975	382	+0.15%
1982	414	+1.16%
1990	444	+0.88%
1999	474	+0.73%
2007	476	+0.05%
2012	486	+0.42%
2017	460	−1.09%
2023	440	−0.74%
Source: INSEE

== See also ==
- Communes of the Gironde department
