= Arrondissement of Libourne =

Coordinates: 44°54′N 0°14′W

Libourne
- Arrondissement
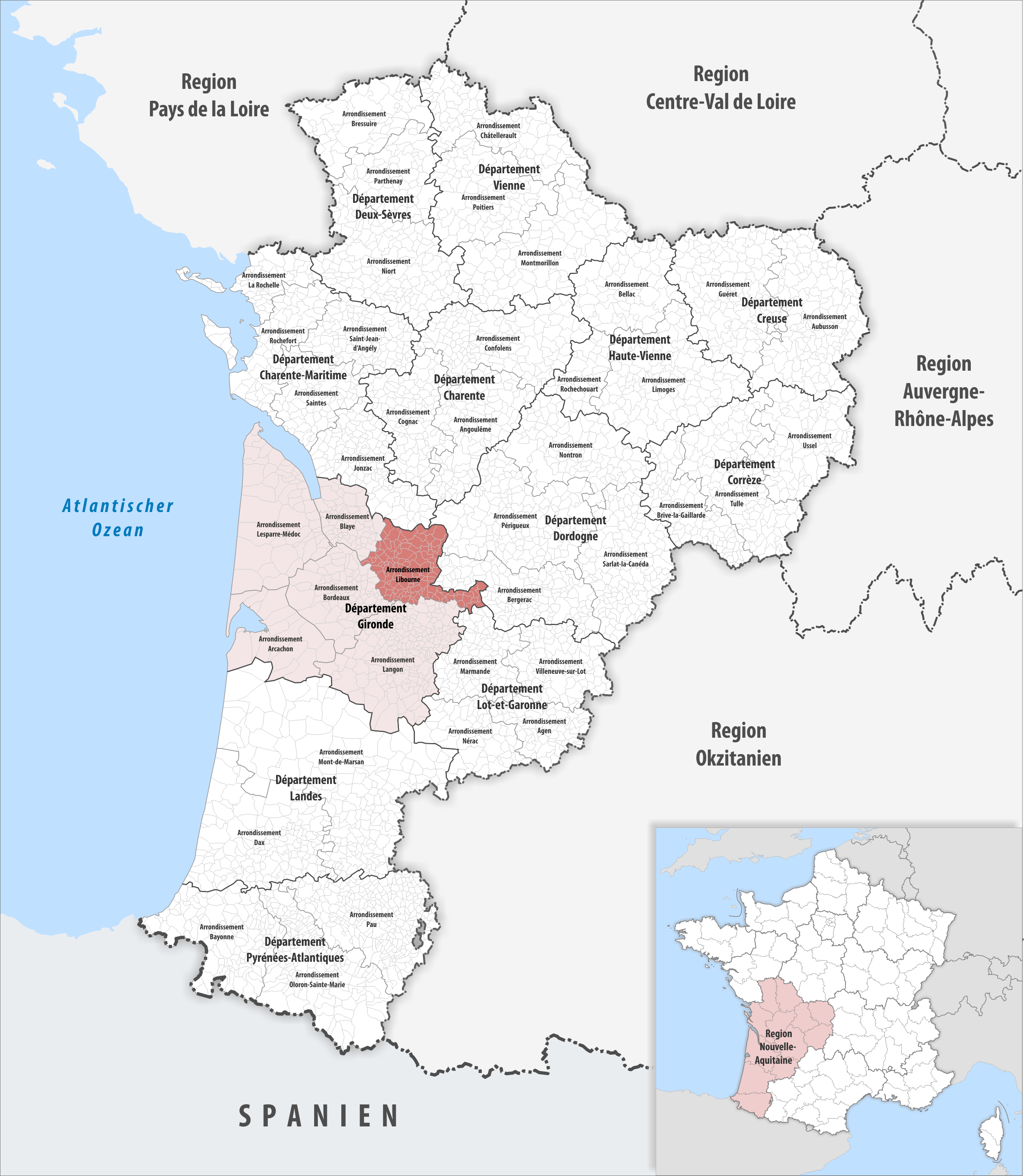
- Location within the region Nouvelle-Aquitaine
- Country: France
- Region: Nouvelle-Aquitaine
- Department: Gironde
- No. of communes: {{{nbcomm}}}
- Area: 1,282.9 km^{2} (495.3 sq mi)
- Population (2023): 157,782
  - Density: 122.99/km^{2} (318.54/sq mi)
- INSEE code: 335

The arrondissement of Libourne is an arrondissement of France in the Gironde department in the Nouvelle-Aquitaine region. It has 129 communes. Its population is 156,142 (2021), and its area is 1,282.9 km^{2} (495.3 sq mi).

== Composition ==
The communes of the arrondissement of Libourne, and their INSEE codes, are:

- Abzac (33001)
- Les Artigues-de-Lussac (33014)
- Arveyres (33015)
- Asques (33016)
- Baron (33028)
- Bayas (33034)
- Belvès-de-Castillon (33045)
- Les Billaux (33052)
- Bonzac (33062)
- Bossugan (33064)
- Branne (33071)
- Cabara (33078)
- Cadarsac (33079)
- Cadillac-en-Fronsadais (33082)
- Camiac-et-Saint-Denis (33086)
- Camps-sur-l'Isle (33088)
- Caplong (33094)
- Castillon-la-Bataille (33108)
- Chamadelle (33124)
- Civrac-sur-Dordogne (33127)
- Coubeyrac (33133)
- Coutras (33138)
- Daignac (33147)
- Dardenac (33148)
- Doulezon (33153)
- Les Églisottes-et-Chalaures (33154)
- Espiet (33157)
- Eynesse (33160)
- Le Fieu (33166)
- Flaujagues (33168)
- Francs (33173)
- Fronsac (33174)
- Galgon (33179)
- Gardegan-et-Tourtirac (33181)
- Génissac (33185)
- Gensac (33186)
- Gours (33191)
- Grézillac (33194)
- Guillac (33196)
- Guîtres (33198)
- Izon (33207)
- Jugazan (33209)
- Juillac (33210)
- La Roquille (33360)
- Lagorce (33218)
- Lalande-de-Pomerol (33222)
- La Lande-de-Fronsac (33219)
- Lapouyade (33230)
- Les Lèves-et-Thoumeyragues (33242)
- Libourne (33243)
- Ligueux (33246)
- Lugaignac (33257)
- Lugon-et-l'Île-du-Carnay (33259)
- Lussac (33261)
- Maransin (33264)
- Margueron (33269)
- Montagne (33290)
- Mouillac (33295)
- Mouliets-et-Villemartin (33296)
- Moulon (33298)
- Naujan-et-Postiac (33301)
- Néac (33302)
- Nérigean (33303)
- Les Peintures (33315)
- Périssac (33317)
- Pessac-sur-Dordogne (33319)
- Petit-Palais-et-Cornemps (33320)
- Pineuilh (33324)
- Pomerol (33328)
- Porchères (33332)
- Puisseguin (33342)
- Pujols (33344)
- Puynormand (33347)
- Rauzan (33350)
- Riocaud (33354)
- La Rivière (33356)
- Sablons (33362)
- Saillans (33364)
- Saint-Aignan (33365)
- Saint-André-et-Appelles (33369)
- Saint-Antoine-sur-l'Isle (33373)
- Saint-Aubin-de-Branne (33375)
- Saint-Avit-de-Soulège (33377)
- Saint-Avit-Saint-Nazaire (33378)
- Saint-Christophe-de-Double (33385)
- Saint-Christophe-des-Bardes (33384)
- Saint-Cibard (33386)
- Saint-Ciers-d'Abzac (33387)
- Saint-Denis-de-Pile (33393)
- Sainte-Colombe (33390)
- Sainte-Florence (33401)
- Sainte-Foy-la-Grande (33402)
- Saint-Émilion (33394)
- Sainte-Radegonde (33468)
- Sainte-Terre (33485)
- Saint-Étienne-de-Lisse (33396)
- Saint-Genès-de-Castillon (33406)
- Saint-Genès-de-Fronsac (33407)
- Saint-Germain-de-la-Rivière (33414)
- Saint-Germain-du-Puch (33413)
- Saint-Hippolyte (33420)
- Saint-Jean-de-Blaignac (33421)
- Saint-Laurent-des-Combes (33426)
- Saint-Magne-de-Castillon (33437)
- Saint-Martin-de-Laye (33442)
- Saint-Martin-du-Bois (33445)
- Saint-Médard-de-Guizières (33447)
- Saint-Michel-de-Fronsac (33451)
- Saint-Pey-d'Armens (33459)
- Saint-Pey-de-Castets (33460)
- Saint-Philippe-d'Aiguille (33461)
- Saint-Philippe-du-Seignal (33462)
- Saint-Quentin-de-Baron (33466)
- Saint-Quentin-de-Caplong (33467)
- Saint-Romain-la-Virvée (33470)
- Saint-Sauveur-de-Puynormand (33472)
- Saint-Seurin-sur-l'Isle (33478)
- Saint-Sulpice-de-Faleyrens (33480)
- Saint-Vincent-de-Pertignas (33488)
- Les Salles-de-Castillon (33499)
- Savignac-de-l'Isle (33509)
- Tarnès (33524)
- Tayac (33526)
- Tizac-de-Curton (33531)
- Tizac-de-Lapouyade (33532)
- Vayres (33539)
- Vérac (33542)
- Vignonet (33546)
- Villegouge (33548)

== History ==
The arrondissement of Libourne was created in 1800.

As a result of the reorganisation of the cantons of France which came into effect in 2015, the borders of the cantons are no longer related to the borders of the arrondissements. The cantons of the arrondissement of Libourne were, as of January 2015:

- Branne
- Castillon-la-Bataille
- Coutras
- Fronsac
- Guîtres
- Libourne
- Lussac
- Pujols
- Sainte-Foy-la-Grande
