= Caplong =

- Commune
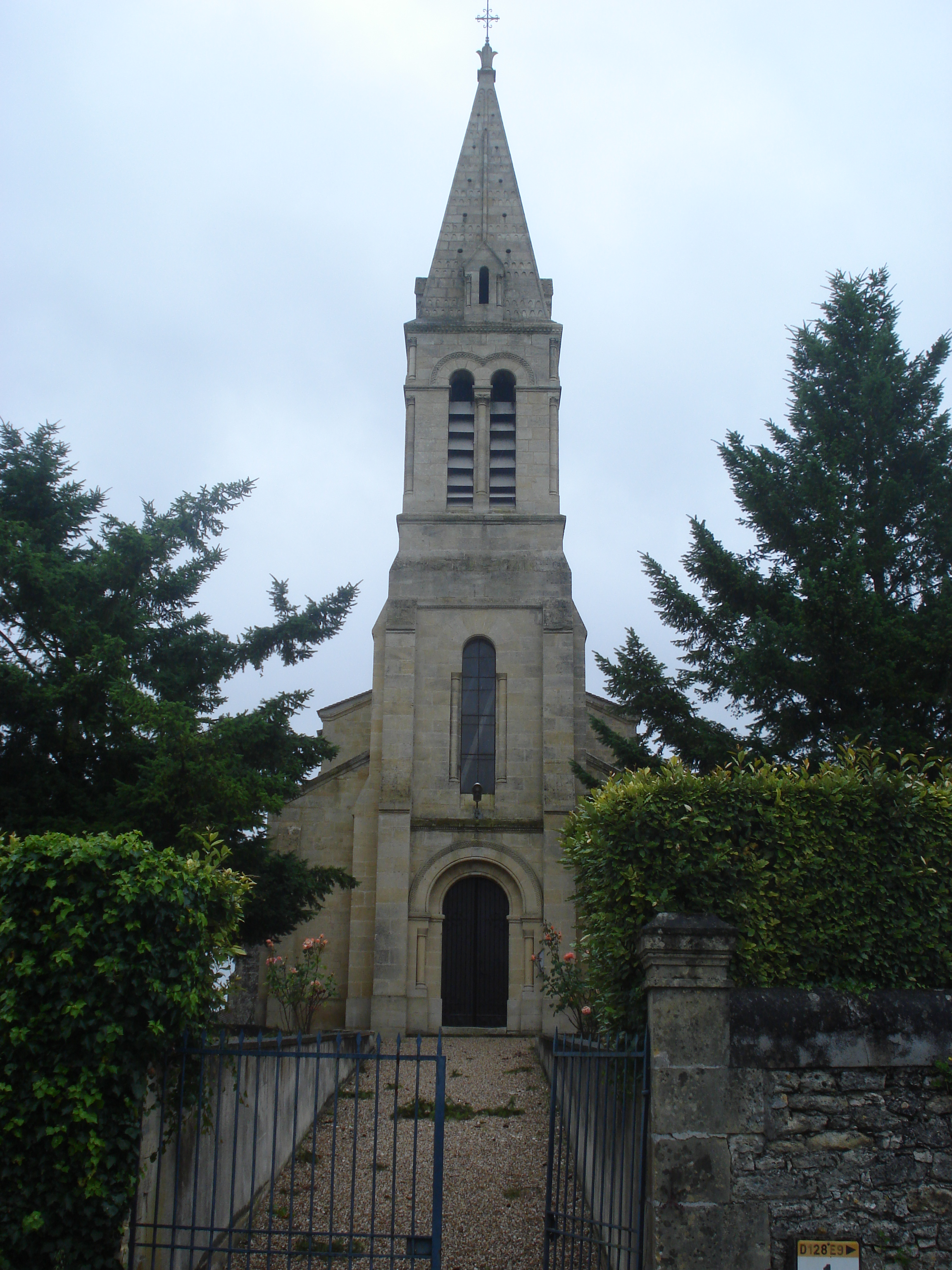
- The church in Caplong
- Location of Caplong
- Location within France Location within Nouvelle-Aquitaine
- Coordinates: 44°46′41″N 0°08′19″E
- Country: France
- Region: Nouvelle-Aquitaine
- Department: Gironde
- Arrondissement: Libourne
- Canton: Le Réolais et Les Bastides
- Intercommunality: Pays Foyen

Government
  - Mayor (2020–2026): Magali Verite
- Area^{1}: 9.27 km^{2} (3.58 sq mi)
- Elevation: 76 m (249 ft)
- Highest elevation: 118 m (387 ft)
- Lowest elevation: 43 m (141 ft)
- Population (2023): 245
  - Density: 26.4/km^{2} (68.5/sq mi)
- Time zone: UTC+01:00 (CET)
  - Summer (DST): UTC+02:00 (CEST)
- INSEE/Postal code: 33094 /33220
- ^{1} French Land Register data, which excludes lakes, ponds, glaciers > 1 km^{2} (0.386 sq mi or 247 acres) and river estuaries.

Caplong (French pronunciation: [kaplɔ̃]; Occitan: Cablong) is a commune in the Gironde department in Nouvelle-Aquitaine in southwestern France.

== Population ==
Historical population
Year	Pop.	±% p.a.
1968	246	—
1975	196	−3.19%
1982	184	−0.90%
1990	188	+0.27%
1999	204	+0.91%
2007	208	+0.24%
2012	228	+1.85%
2017	225	−0.26%
2023	245	+1.43%
Source: INSEE

== See also ==
- Communes of the Gironde department
