= Izon, Gironde =

Izon
- Commune
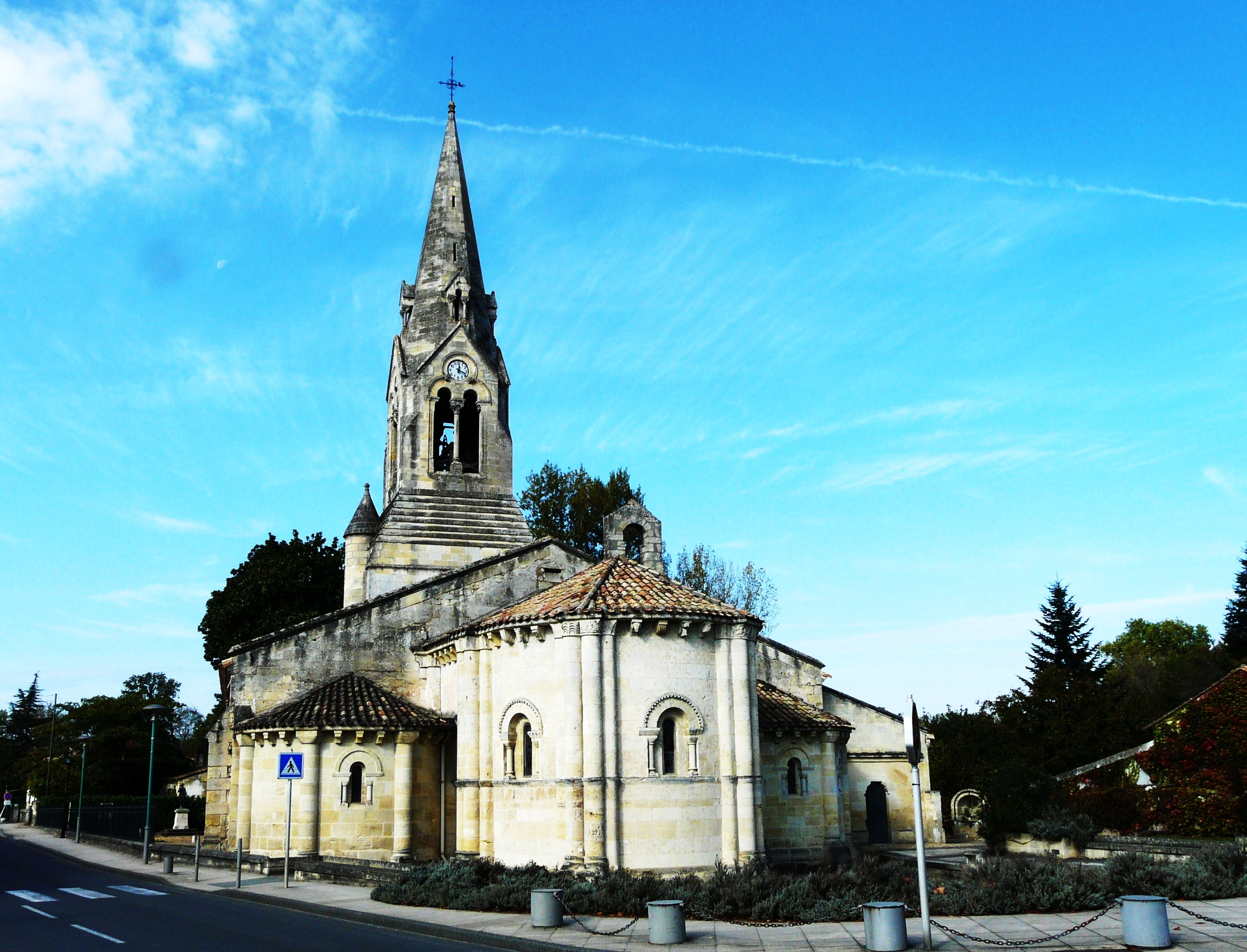
- The church in Izon

- Coat of arms
- Location of Izon
- Location within France Location within Nouvelle-Aquitaine
- Coordinates: 44°55′16″N 0°21′38″W
- Country: France
- Region: Nouvelle-Aquitaine
- Department: Gironde
- Arrondissement: Libourne
- Canton: Le Libournais-Fronsadais
- Intercommunality: CA Libournais

Government
  - Mayor (2020–2026): Laurent de Launay
- Area^{1}: 15.59 km^{2} (6.02 sq mi)
- Highest elevation: 21 m (69 ft)
- Lowest elevation: 1 m (3.3 ft)
- Population (2023): 6,374
  - Density: 408.9/km^{2} (1,059/sq mi)
- Time zone: UTC+01:00 (CET)
  - Summer (DST): UTC+02:00 (CEST)
- INSEE/Postal code: 33207 /33450
- ^{1} French Land Register data, which excludes lakes, ponds, glaciers > 1 km^{2} (0.386 sq mi or 247 acres) and river estuaries.

Izon (French pronunciation: [izɔ̃]; Occitan: Ison) is a commune in the Gironde department in Nouvelle-Aquitaine in southwestern France.

== Population ==
Historical population
Year	Pop.	±% p.a.
1968	1,323	—
1975	1,689	+3.55%
1982	2,148	+3.49%
1990	3,361	+5.76%
1999	3,958	+1.83%
2007	5,186	+3.44%
2012	5,349	+0.62%
2017	5,810	+1.67%
2023	6,374	+1.56%
Source: INSEE

== See also ==
- Communes of the Gironde department
