= Canton of Le Libournais-Fronsadais =

Coordinates: 44.91°N 0.24°W

The canton of Le Libournais-Fronsadais is an administrative division of the Gironde department, southwestern France. It was created at the French canton reorganisation which came into effect in March 2015. Its seat is in Libourne.

It consists of the following communes:

1. Arveyres
2. Asques
3. Les Billaux
4. Cadarsac
5. Cadillac-en-Fronsadais
6. Fronsac
7. Galgon
8. Izon
9. Lalande-de-Pomerol
10. La Lande-de-Fronsac
11. Libourne
12. Lugon-et-l'Île-du-Carnay
13. Mouillac
14. Pomerol
15. La Rivière
16. Saillans
17. Saint-Aignan
18. Saint-Germain-de-la-Rivière
19. Saint-Michel-de-Fronsac
20. Saint-Romain-la-Virvée
21. Tarnès
22. Vayres
23. Vérac
24. Villegouge
