= Tarnès =

- Commune
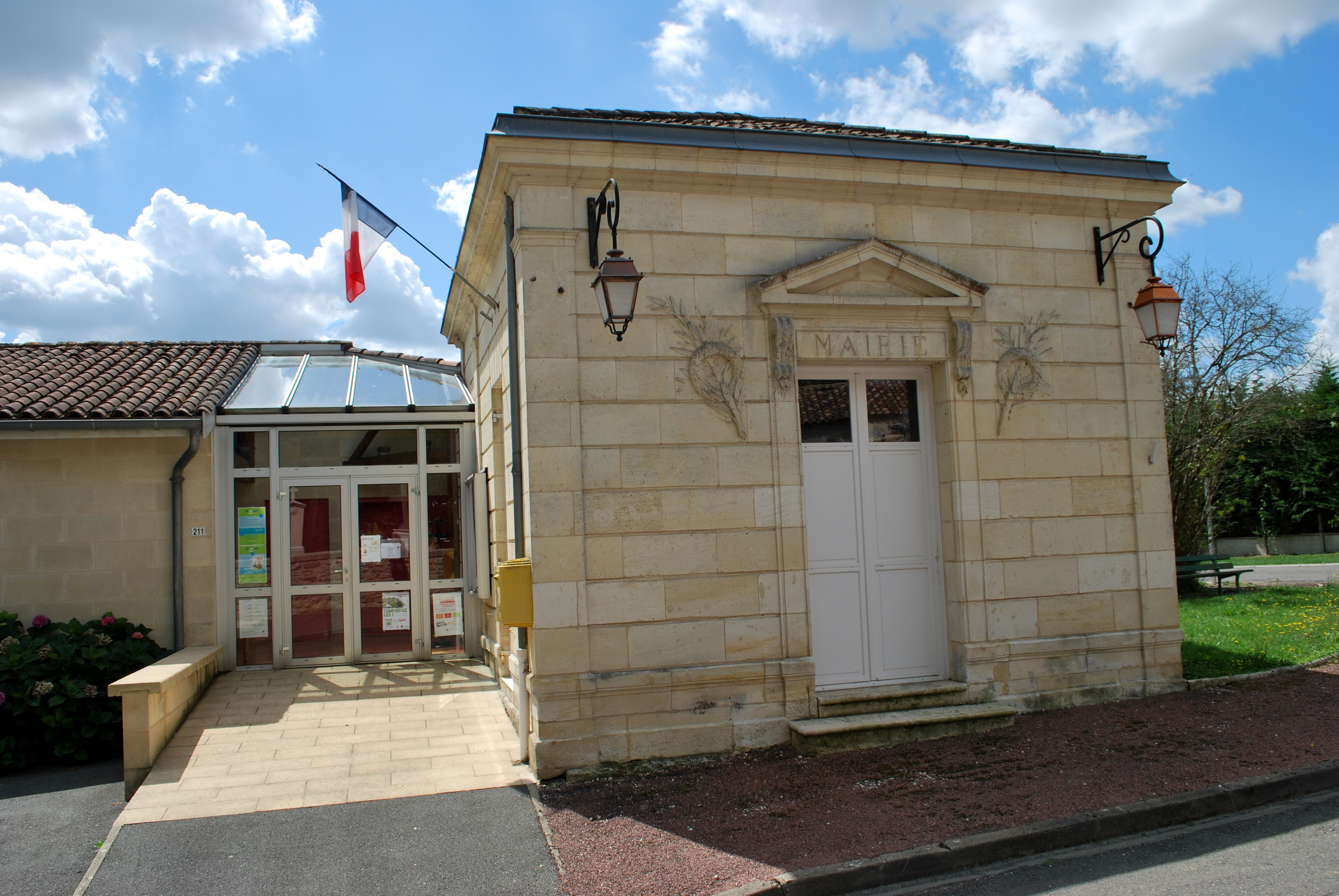
- The town hall in Tarnès
- Location of Tarnès
- Location within France Location within Nouvelle-Aquitaine
- Coordinates: 44°58′35″N 0°21′29″W
- Country: France
- Region: Nouvelle-Aquitaine
- Department: Gironde
- Arrondissement: Libourne
- Canton: Le Libournais-Fronsadais
- Intercommunality: Fronsadais

Government
  - Mayor (2020–2026): Laurent Garbuio
- Area^{1}: 1.45 km^{2} (0.56 sq mi)
- Elevation: 40 m (130 ft)
- Highest elevation: 34 m (112 ft)
- Lowest elevation: 4 m (13 ft)
- Population (2023): 298
  - Density: 206/km^{2} (532/sq mi)
- Time zone: UTC+01:00 (CET)
  - Summer (DST): UTC+02:00 (CEST)
- INSEE/Postal code: 33524 /33240
- ^{1} French Land Register data, which excludes lakes, ponds, glaciers > 1 km^{2} (0.386 sq mi or 247 acres) and river estuaries.

Tarnès (French pronunciation: [taʁnɛ]; Occitan: Tarnés) is a commune in the Gironde department in Nouvelle-Aquitaine in southwestern France.

== Population ==
Historical population
Year	Pop.	±% p.a.
1968	94	—
1975	101	+1.03%
1982	166	+7.36%
1990	201	+2.42%
1999	254	+2.63%
2007	263	+0.44%
2012	258	−0.38%
2017	325	+4.73%
2023	298	−1.44%
Source: INSEE

== See also ==
- Communes of the Gironde department
