= Génissac =

- Commune
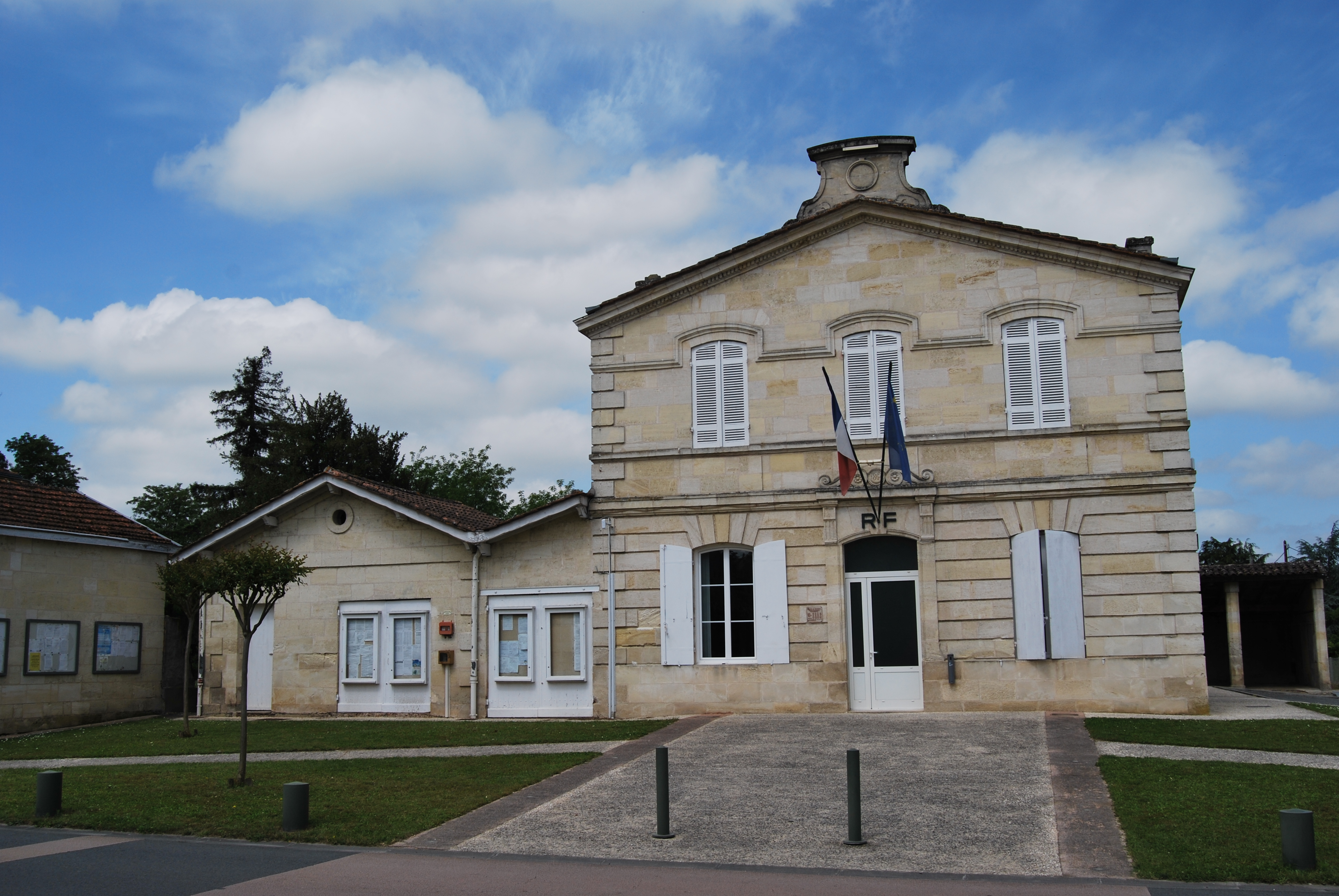
- The town hall in Génissac
- Location of Génissac
- Location within France Location within Nouvelle-Aquitaine
- Coordinates: 44°51′33″N 0°15′23″W
- Country: France
- Region: Nouvelle-Aquitaine
- Department: Gironde
- Arrondissement: Libourne
- Canton: Les Coteaux de Dordogne
- Intercommunality: CA Libournais

Government
  - Mayor (2022–2026): Emeline Carole Brisseau
- Area^{1}: 13.04 km^{2} (5.03 sq mi)
- Elevation: 10 m (33 ft)
- Highest elevation: 77 m (253 ft)
- Lowest elevation: 2 m (6.6 ft)
- Population (2023): 2,041
  - Density: 156.5/km^{2} (405.4/sq mi)
- Time zone: UTC+01:00 (CET)
  - Summer (DST): UTC+02:00 (CEST)
- INSEE/Postal code: 33185 /33420
- ^{1} French Land Register data, which excludes lakes, ponds, glaciers > 1 km^{2} (0.386 sq mi or 247 acres) and river estuaries.

Génissac (French pronunciation: [ʒenisak]; Occitan: Geniçac) is a commune in the Gironde department in southwestern France.

== Population ==
Historical population
Year	Pop.	±% p.a.
1968	1,018	—
1975	1,110	+1.24%
1982	1,127	+0.22%
1990	1,153	+0.29%
1999	1,320	+1.51%
2007	1,578	+2.26%
2012	1,857	+3.31%
2017	1,948	+0.96%
2023	2,041	+0.78%
Source: INSEE

== See also ==
- Communes of the Gironde department
