= Moulon, Gironde =

Moulon
- Commune
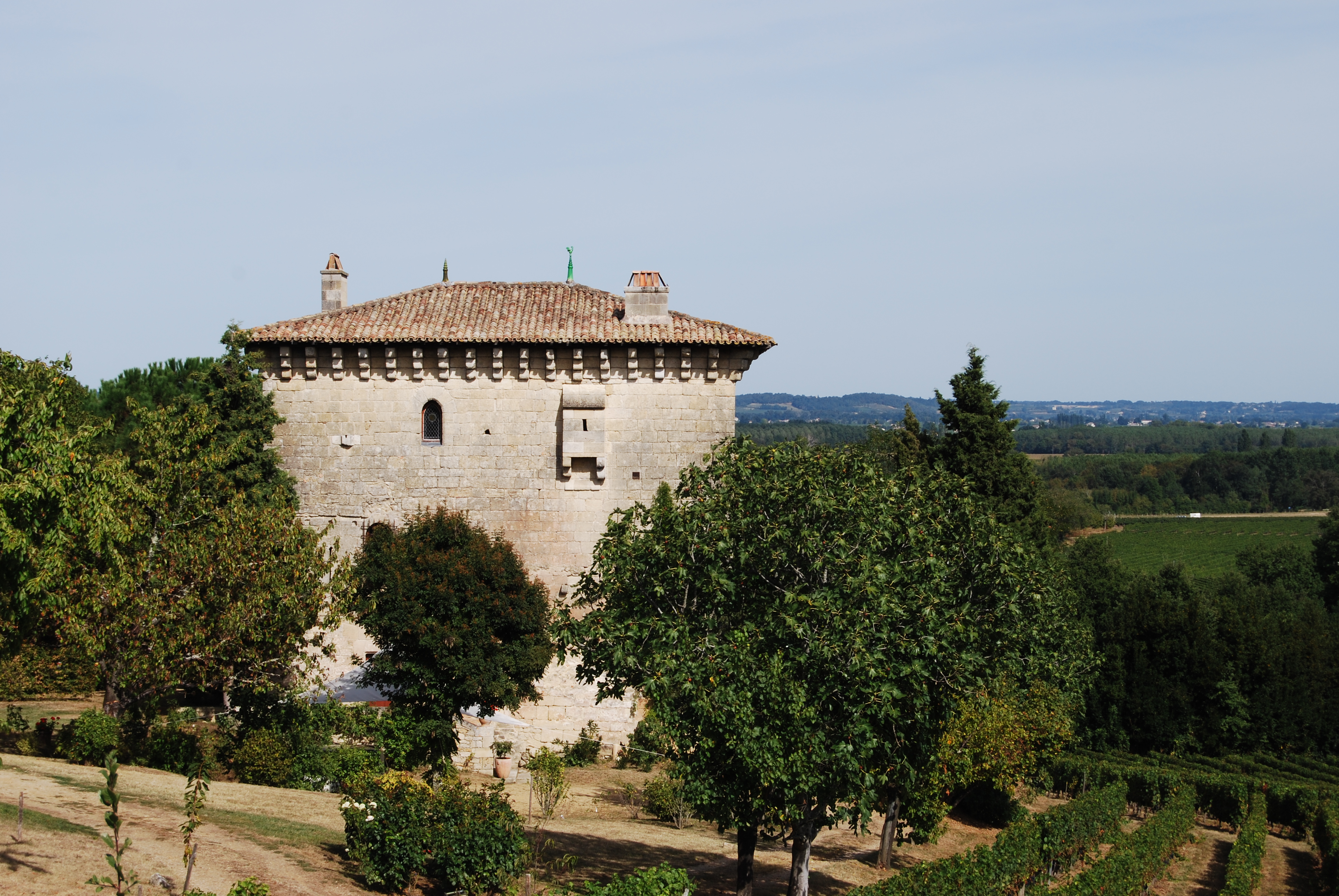
- Ansouhaite tower
- Location of Moulon
- Location within France Location within Nouvelle-Aquitaine
- Coordinates: 44°50′54″N 0°13′10″W
- Country: France
- Region: Nouvelle-Aquitaine
- Department: Gironde
- Arrondissement: Libourne
- Canton: Les Coteaux de Dordogne
- Intercommunality: CA Libournais

Government
  - Mayor (2020–2026): Renaud Chalengeas
- Area^{1}: 13.25 km^{2} (5.12 sq mi)
- Elevation: 30 m (98 ft)
- Highest elevation: 76 m (249 ft)
- Lowest elevation: 2 m (6.6 ft)
- Population (2023): 1,068
  - Density: 80.60/km^{2} (208.8/sq mi)
- Time zone: UTC+01:00 (CET)
  - Summer (DST): UTC+02:00 (CEST)
- INSEE/Postal code: 33298 /33420
- ^{1} French Land Register data, which excludes lakes, ponds, glaciers > 1 km^{2} (0.386 sq mi or 247 acres) and river estuaries.

Moulon (French pronunciation: [mulɔ̃]; Occitan: Molon) is a commune in the Gironde department in Nouvelle-Aquitaine in southwestern France.

== Population ==
Historical population
Year	Pop.	±% p.a.
1968	755	—
1975	719	−0.70%
1982	737	+0.35%
1990	866	+2.04%
1999	925	+0.74%
2007	938	+0.17%
2012	982	+0.92%
2017	999	+0.34%
2023	1,068	+1.12%
Source: INSEE

== See also ==
- Communes of the Gironde department
