= Cadillac-en-Fronsadais =

- Commune
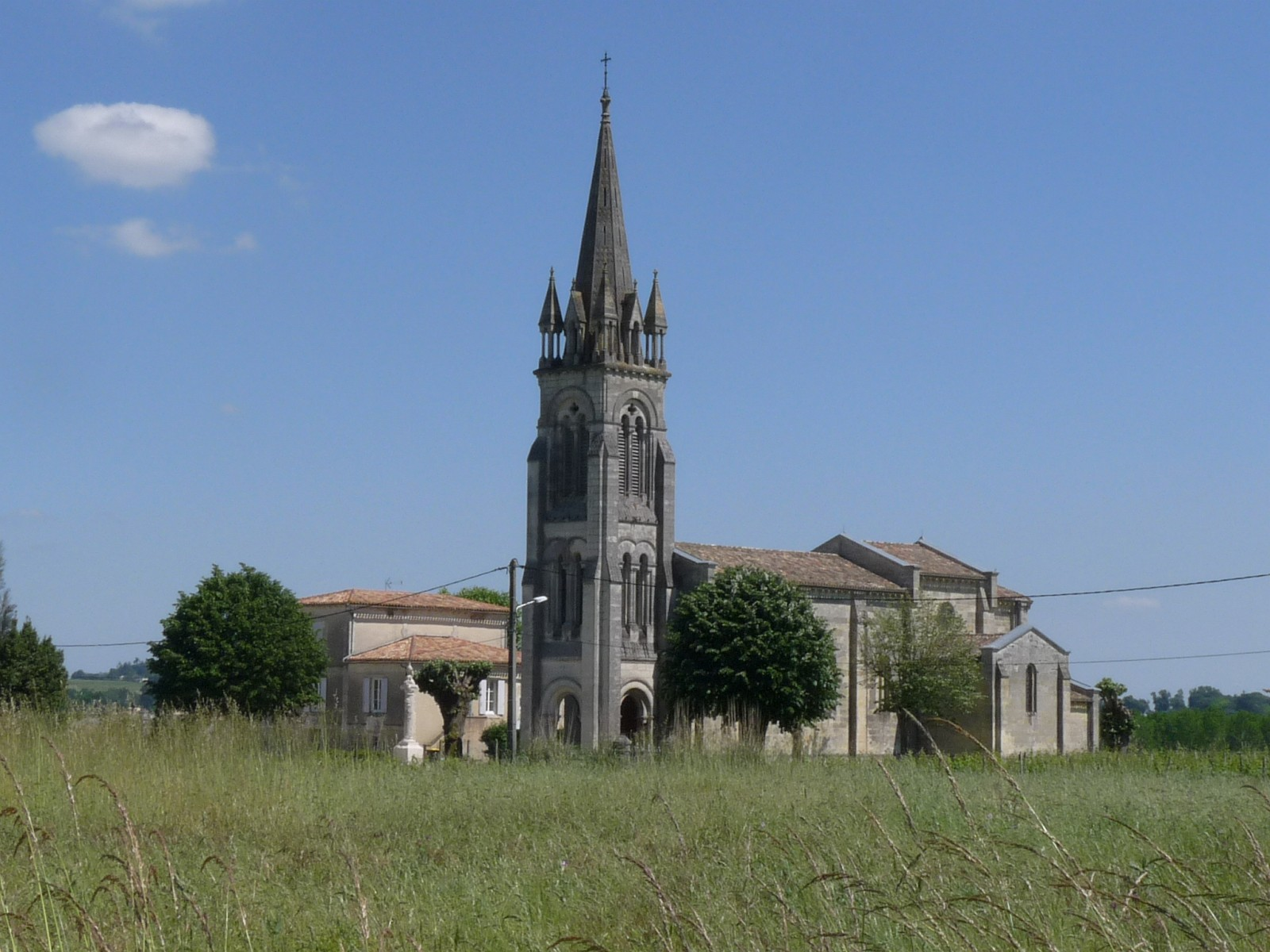
- The church in Cadillac-en-Fronsadais

- Coat of arms
- Location of Cadillac-en-Fronsadais
- Location within France Location within Nouvelle-Aquitaine
- Coordinates: 44°58′03″N 0°22′21″W
- Country: France
- Region: Nouvelle-Aquitaine
- Department: Gironde
- Arrondissement: Libourne
- Canton: Le Libournais-Fronsadais
- Intercommunality: Fronsadais

Government
  - Mayor (2020–2026): Richard Barbe
- Area^{1}: 3.81 km^{2} (1.47 sq mi)
- Elevation: 29 m (95 ft)
- Highest elevation: 62 m (203 ft)
- Lowest elevation: 1 m (3.3 ft)
- Population (2023): 1,336
  - Density: 351/km^{2} (908/sq mi)
- Time zone: UTC+01:00 (CET)
  - Summer (DST): UTC+02:00 (CEST)
- INSEE/Postal code: 33082 /33240
- ^{1} French Land Register data, which excludes lakes, ponds, glaciers > 1 km^{2} (0.386 sq mi or 247 acres) and river estuaries.

Cadillac-en-Fronsadais (French pronunciation: [kadijˈak ˈɑ̃ fʁɔ̃sadˈɛ]) is a commune in the Gironde department in Nouvelle-Aquitaine in southwestern France.

== Population ==
Historical population
Year	Pop.	±% p.a.
1968	453	—
1975	602	+4.15%
1982	774	+3.66%
1990	899	+1.89%
1999	886	−0.16%
2007	1,072	+2.41%
2012	1,241	+2.97%
2017	1,249	+0.13%
2023	1,336	+1.13%
Source: INSEE

== See also ==
- Communes of the Gironde department
