= Lugon-et-l'Île-du-Carnay =

- Commune
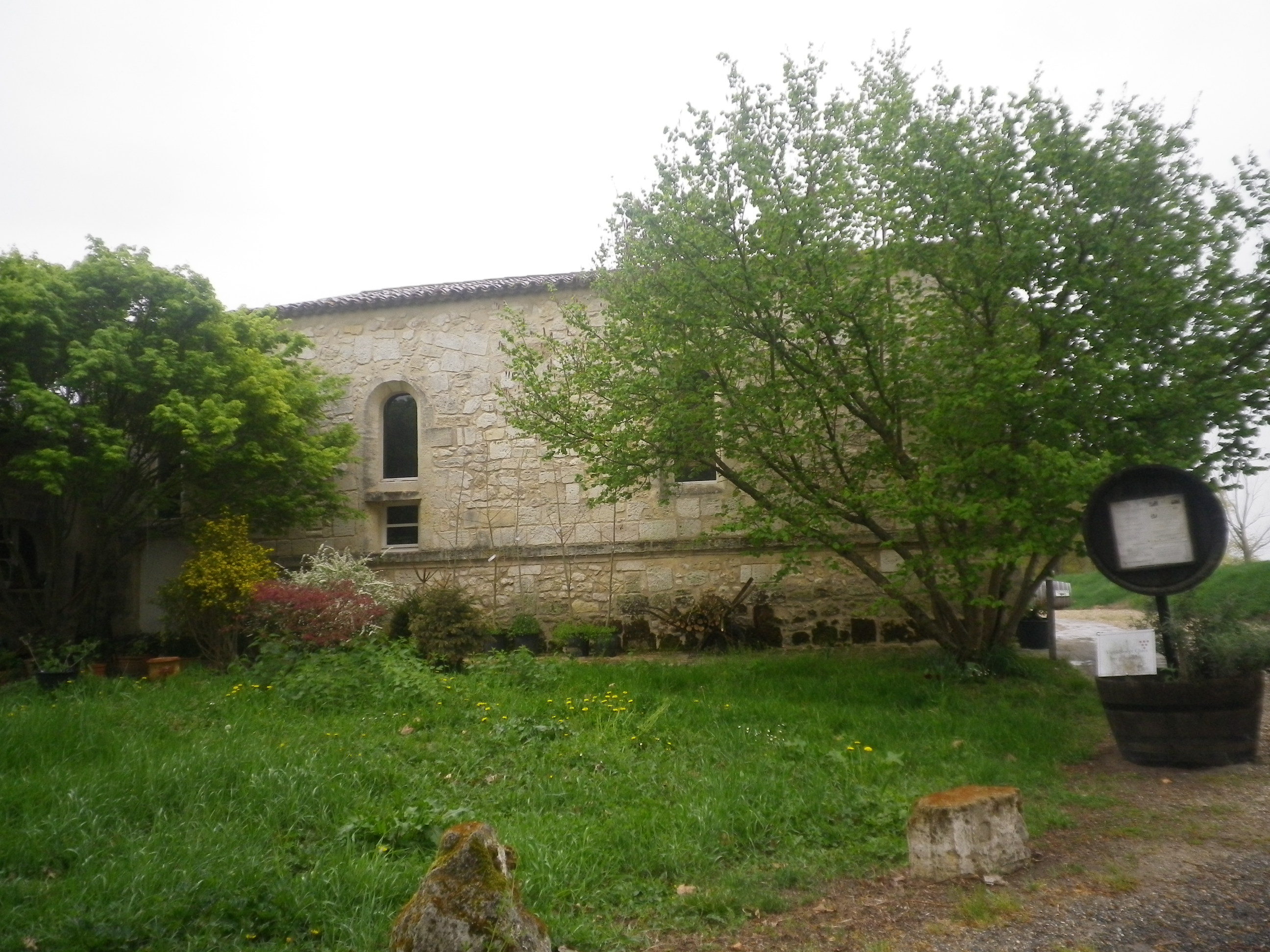
- Old church

- Coat of arms
- Location of Lugon-et-l'Île-du-Carnay
- Location within France Location within Nouvelle-Aquitaine
- Coordinates: 44°57′30″N 0°20′23″W
- Country: France
- Region: Nouvelle-Aquitaine
- Department: Gironde
- Arrondissement: Libourne
- Canton: Le Libournais-Fronsadais
- Intercommunality: Fronsadais

Government
  - Mayor (2020–2026): Michaël Cenni
- Area^{1}: 10.94 km^{2} (4.22 sq mi)
- Elevation: 32 m (105 ft)
- Highest elevation: 72 m (236 ft)
- Lowest elevation: 1 m (3.3 ft)
- Population (2023): 1,395
  - Density: 127.5/km^{2} (330.3/sq mi)
- Time zone: UTC+01:00 (CET)
  - Summer (DST): UTC+02:00 (CEST)
- INSEE/Postal code: 33259 /33240
- ^{1} French Land Register data, which excludes lakes, ponds, glaciers > 1 km^{2} (0.386 sq mi or 247 acres) and river estuaries.

Lugon-et-l'Île-du-Carnay (French pronunciation: [lyɡɔ̃ e lil dy kaʁnɛ]; Occitan: Lugon e l'Isla dòu Carnèir) is a commune in the Gironde department in Nouvelle-Aquitaine in southwestern France.

== Population ==
Historical population
| Year | Pop. | ±% p.a. |
|---|---|---|
| 1968 | 816 | — |
| 1975 | 829 | +0.23% |
| 1982 | 973 | +2.31% |
| 1990 | 1,026 | +0.67% |
| 1999 | 1,000 | −0.28% |
| 2007 | 1,063 | +0.77% |
| 2012 | 1,162 | +1.80% |
| 2017 | 1,281 | +1.97% |
| 2023 | 1,395 | +1.43% |
Source: INSEE

== See also ==
- Communes of the Gironde department
