= Nérigean =

- Commune
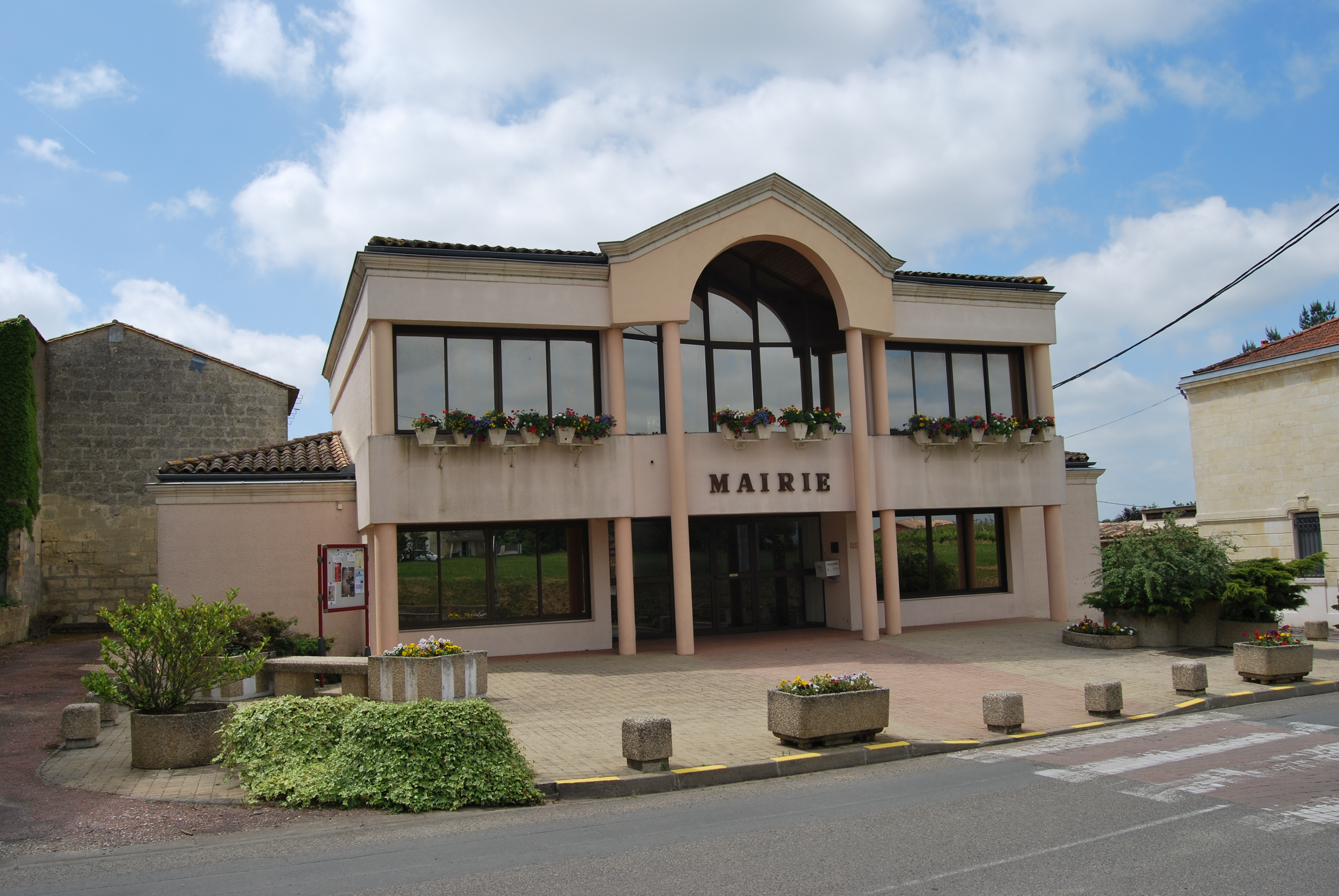
- The town hall in Nérigean
- Location of Nérigean
- Location within France Location within Nouvelle-Aquitaine
- Coordinates: 44°50′32″N 0°17′17″W
- Country: France
- Region: Nouvelle-Aquitaine
- Department: Gironde
- Arrondissement: Libourne
- Canton: Les Coteaux de Dordogne
- Intercommunality: CA Libournais

Government
  - Mayor (2020–2026): Jean-Luc Lamaison
- Area^{1}: 9.98 km^{2} (3.85 sq mi)
- Elevation: 70 m (230 ft)
- Highest elevation: 76 m (249 ft)
- Lowest elevation: 8 m (26 ft)
- Population (2023): 839
  - Density: 84.1/km^{2} (218/sq mi)
- Time zone: UTC+01:00 (CET)
  - Summer (DST): UTC+02:00 (CEST)
- INSEE/Postal code: 33303 /33750
- ^{1} French Land Register data, which excludes lakes, ponds, glaciers > 1 km^{2} (0.386 sq mi or 247 acres) and river estuaries.

Nérigean (French pronunciation: [neʁiʒɑ̃]; Occitan: Nerijan) is a commune in the Gironde department in Nouvelle-Aquitaine in southwestern France.

== Population ==
Historical population
Year	Pop.	±% p.a.
1968	560	—
1975	654	+2.24%
1982	948	+5.45%
1990	1,036	+1.12%
1999	880	−1.80%
2007	882	+0.03%
2012	838	−1.02%
2017	839	+0.02%
2023	839	+0.00%
Source: INSEE

== See also ==
- Communes of the Gironde department
