= Margueron =

- Commune
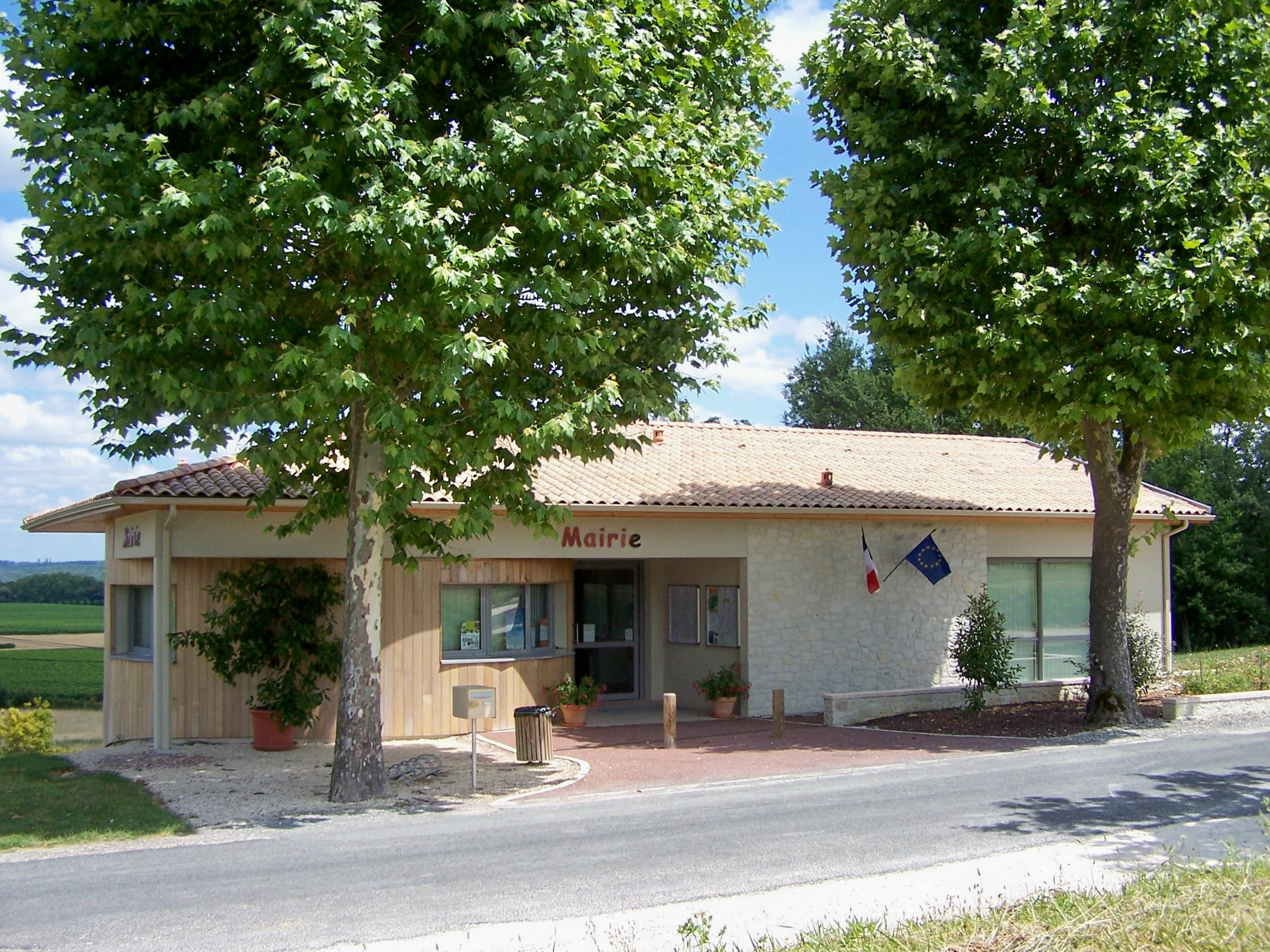
- Town hall
- Location of Margueron
- Location within France Location within Nouvelle-Aquitaine
- Coordinates: 44°45′47″N 0°15′01″E
- Country: France
- Region: Nouvelle-Aquitaine
- Department: Gironde
- Arrondissement: Libourne
- Canton: Le Réolais et Les Bastides
- Intercommunality: Pays Foyen

Government
  - Mayor (2020–2026): Patrick Festal
- Area^{1}: 13.57 km^{2} (5.24 sq mi)
- Elevation: 120 m (390 ft)
- Highest elevation: 132 m (433 ft)
- Lowest elevation: 49 m (161 ft)
- Population (2023): 365
  - Density: 26.9/km^{2} (69.7/sq mi)
- Time zone: UTC+01:00 (CET)
  - Summer (DST): UTC+02:00 (CEST)
- INSEE/Postal code: 33269 /33220
- ^{1} French Land Register data, which excludes lakes, ponds, glaciers > 1 km^{2} (0.386 sq mi or 247 acres) and river estuaries.

Margueron (French pronunciation: [maʁɡəʁɔ̃]; Occitan: Margairon) is a commune in the Gironde department in Nouvelle-Aquitaine in southwestern France.

== Population ==
Historical population
Year	Pop.	±% p.a.
1968	361	—
1975	360	−0.04%
1982	397	+1.41%
1990	380	−0.55%
1999	398	+0.52%
2007	405	+0.22%
2012	353	−2.71%
2017	397	+2.38%
2023	365	−1.39%
Source: INSEE

== See also ==
- Communes of the Gironde department
