= Saint-Aignan, Gironde =

Saint-Aignan
- Commune
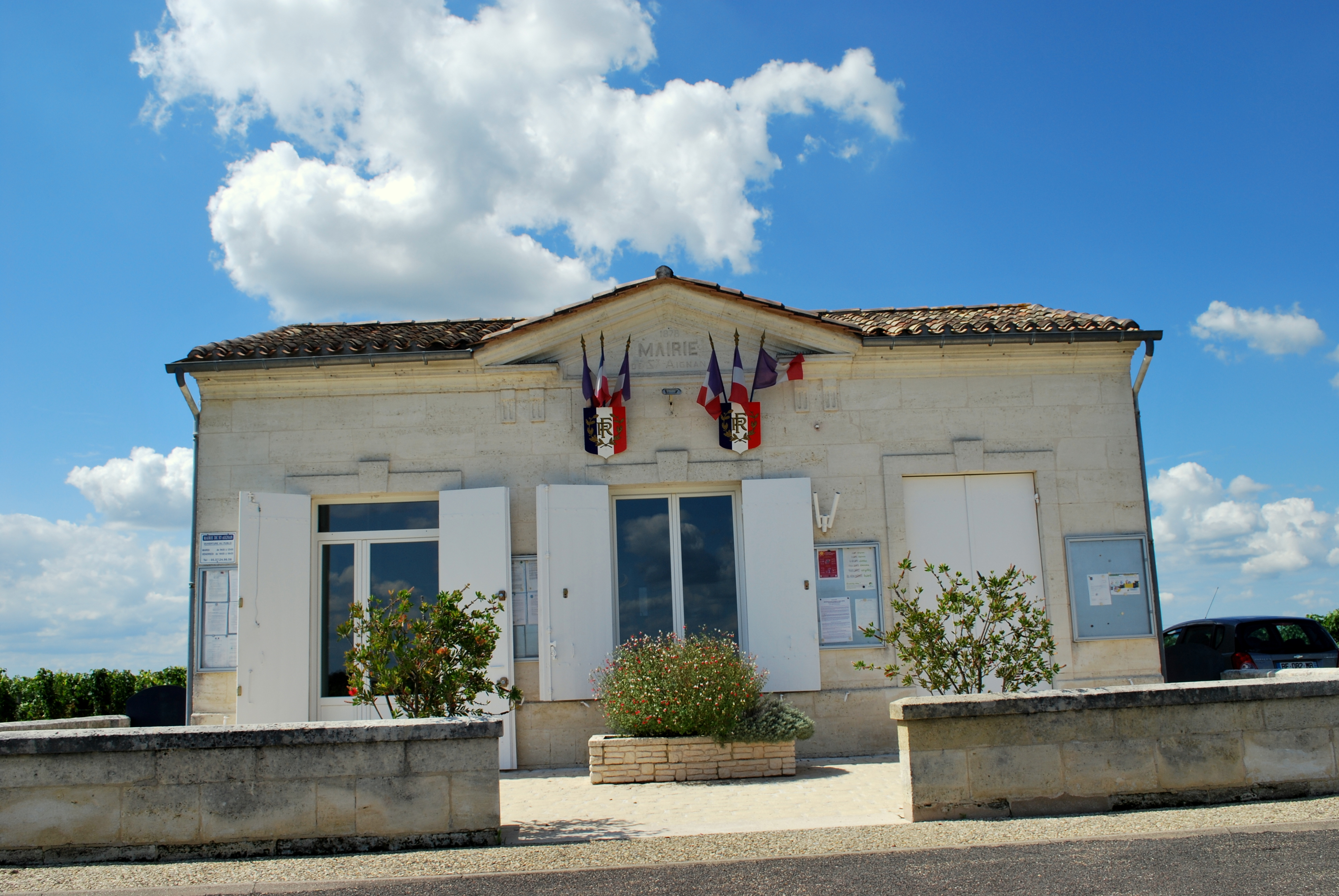
- The town hall in Saint-Aignan
- Location of Saint-Aignan
- Location within France Location within Nouvelle-Aquitaine
- Coordinates: 44°56′41″N 0°17′50″W
- Country: France
- Region: Nouvelle-Aquitaine
- Department: Gironde
- Arrondissement: Libourne
- Canton: Le Libournais-Fronsadais
- Intercommunality: Fronsadais

Government
  - Mayor (2020–2026): Sylvie Mondon
- Area^{1}: 2.75 km^{2} (1.06 sq mi)
- Elevation: 77 m (253 ft)
- Highest elevation: 88 m (289 ft)
- Lowest elevation: 28 m (92 ft)
- Population (2023): 192
  - Density: 69.8/km^{2} (181/sq mi)
- Time zone: UTC+01:00 (CET)
  - Summer (DST): UTC+02:00 (CEST)
- INSEE/Postal code: 33365 /33126
- ^{1} French Land Register data, which excludes lakes, ponds, glaciers > 1 km^{2} (0.386 sq mi or 247 acres) and river estuaries.

Saint-Aignan (French pronunciation: [sɛ̃.t‿ɛɲɑ̃]; Occitan: Sent Anhan) is a commune in the Gironde department in Nouvelle-Aquitaine in southwestern France.

== Population ==
Historical population
Year	Pop.	±% p.a.
1968	244	—
1975	259	+0.86%
1982	264	+0.27%
1990	265	+0.05%
1999	252	−0.56%
2007	234	−0.92%
2012	225	−0.78%
2017	207	−1.65%
2023	192	−1.25%
Source: INSEE

== See also ==
- Communes of the Gironde department
