= Saint-Michel-de-Fronsac =

- Commune
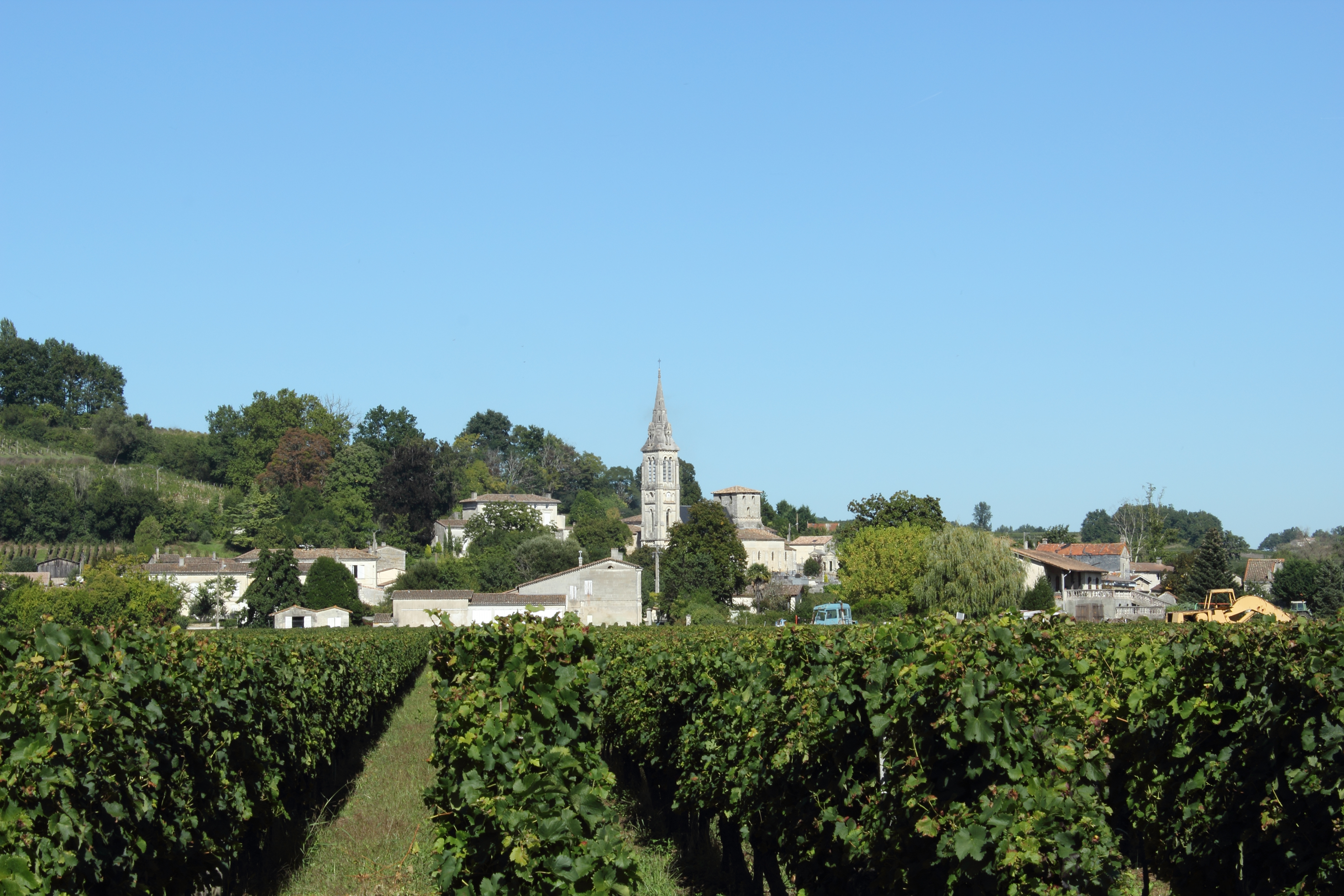
- A general view of Saint-Michel-de-Fronsac
- Location of Saint-Michel-de-Fronsac
- Location within France Location within Nouvelle-Aquitaine
- Coordinates: 44°55′50″N 0°18′07″W
- Country: France
- Region: Nouvelle-Aquitaine
- Department: Gironde
- Arrondissement: Libourne
- Canton: Le Libournais-Fronsadais
- Intercommunality: Fronsadais

Government
  - Mayor (2020–2026): Jean-Marc Duboureau
- Area^{1}: 5.49 km^{2} (2.12 sq mi)
- Elevation: 20 m (66 ft)
- Highest elevation: 79 m (259 ft)
- Lowest elevation: 1 m (3.3 ft)
- Population (2023): 509
  - Density: 92.7/km^{2} (240/sq mi)
- Time zone: UTC+01:00 (CET)
  - Summer (DST): UTC+02:00 (CEST)
- INSEE/Postal code: 33451 /33126
- ^{1} French Land Register data, which excludes lakes, ponds, glaciers > 1 km^{2} (0.386 sq mi or 247 acres) and river estuaries.

Saint-Michel-de-Fronsac (French pronunciation: [sɛ̃ miʃɛl də fʁɔ̃sak], literally Saint-Michel of Fronsac; Occitan: Sent Miquèu de Fronsac) is a commune in the Gironde department in Nouvelle-Aquitaine in southwestern France.

== Population ==
Historical population
Year	Pop.	±% p.a.
1968	513	—
1975	532	+0.52%
1982	527	−0.13%
1990	608	+1.80%
1999	591	−0.31%
2007	550	−0.89%
2012	533	−0.63%
2017	522	−0.42%
2023	509	−0.42%
Source: INSEE

== See also ==
- Communes of the Gironde department
