= La Lande-de-Fronsac =

- Commune
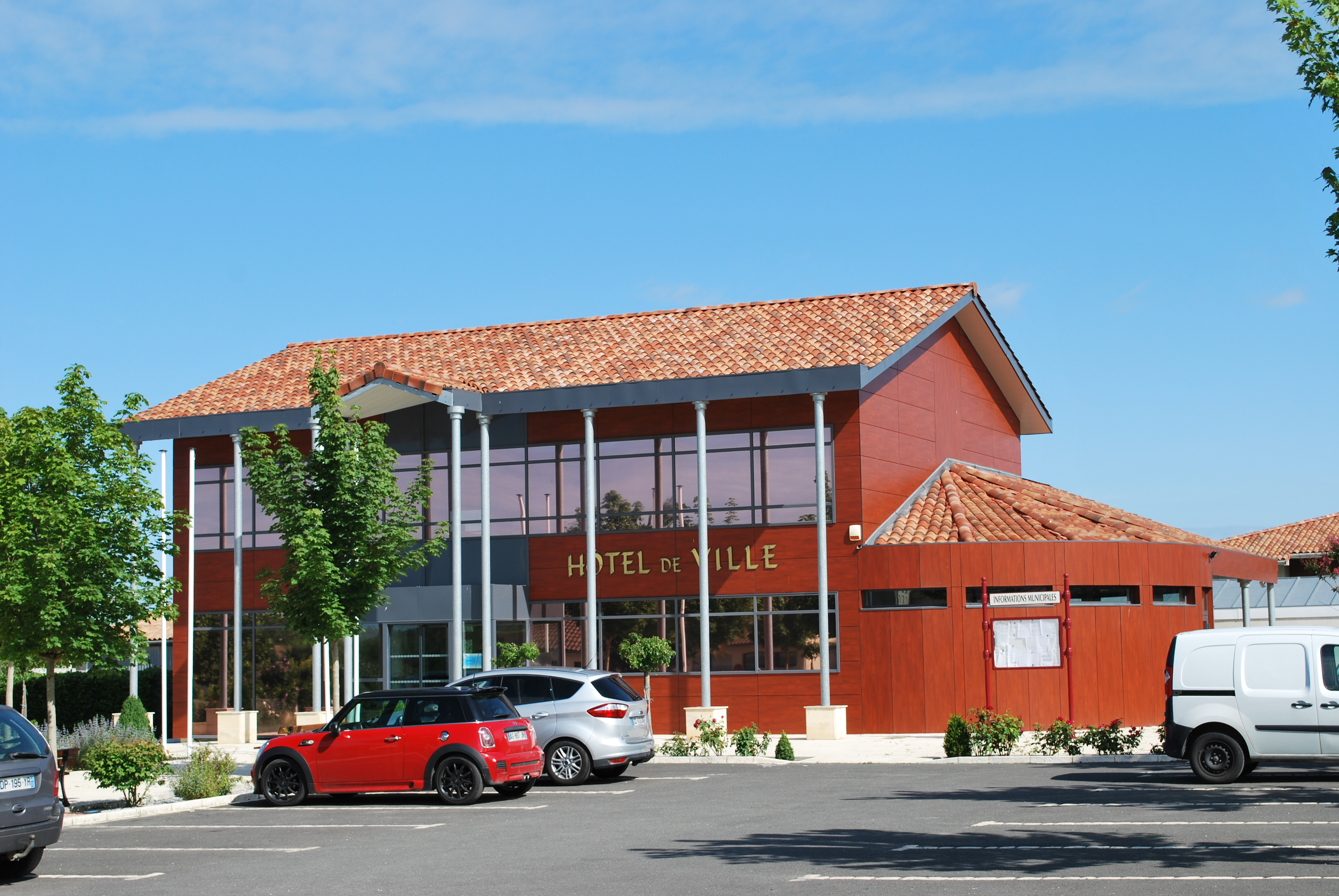
- The town hall in La Lande-de-Fronsac
- Location of La Lande-de-Fronsac
- Location within France Location within Nouvelle-Aquitaine
- Coordinates: 44°58′50″N 0°22′48″W
- Country: France
- Region: Nouvelle-Aquitaine
- Department: Gironde
- Arrondissement: Libourne
- Canton: Le Libournais-Fronsadais
- Intercommunality: Fronsadais

Government
  - Mayor (2020–2026): Jean Galand
- Area^{1}: 8.53 km^{2} (3.29 sq mi)
- Elevation: 42 m (138 ft)
- Highest elevation: 49 m (161 ft)
- Lowest elevation: 6 m (20 ft)
- Population (2023): 2,729
  - Density: 320/km^{2} (829/sq mi)
- Time zone: UTC+01:00 (CET)
  - Summer (DST): UTC+02:00 (CEST)
- INSEE/Postal code: 33219 /33240
- ^{1} French Land Register data, which excludes lakes, ponds, glaciers > 1 km^{2} (0.386 sq mi or 247 acres) and river estuaries.

La Lande-de-Fronsac (French pronunciation: [la lɑ̃d də fʁɔ̃sak]; Occitan: La Landa de Fronsac) is a commune in the Gironde department in Nouvelle-Aquitaine in southwestern France.

== Population ==
Historical population
Year	Pop.	±% p.a.
1968	512	—
1975	624	+2.87%
1982	1,147	+9.09%
1990	1,797	+5.77%
1999	1,871	+0.45%
2007	2,150	+1.75%
2012	2,373	+1.99%
2017	2,412	+0.33%
2023	2,729	+2.08%
Source: INSEE

=== Sights ===
The Medieval Construction Site of Guyenne (FR Le Chantier Médiéval de Guyenne) is a project of experimental archeology, aiming at building an 11th century Chapel, a romanesque cloister and a gothic building.

== See also ==
- Communes of the Gironde department
