= Mouillac, Gironde =

Mouillac
- Commune
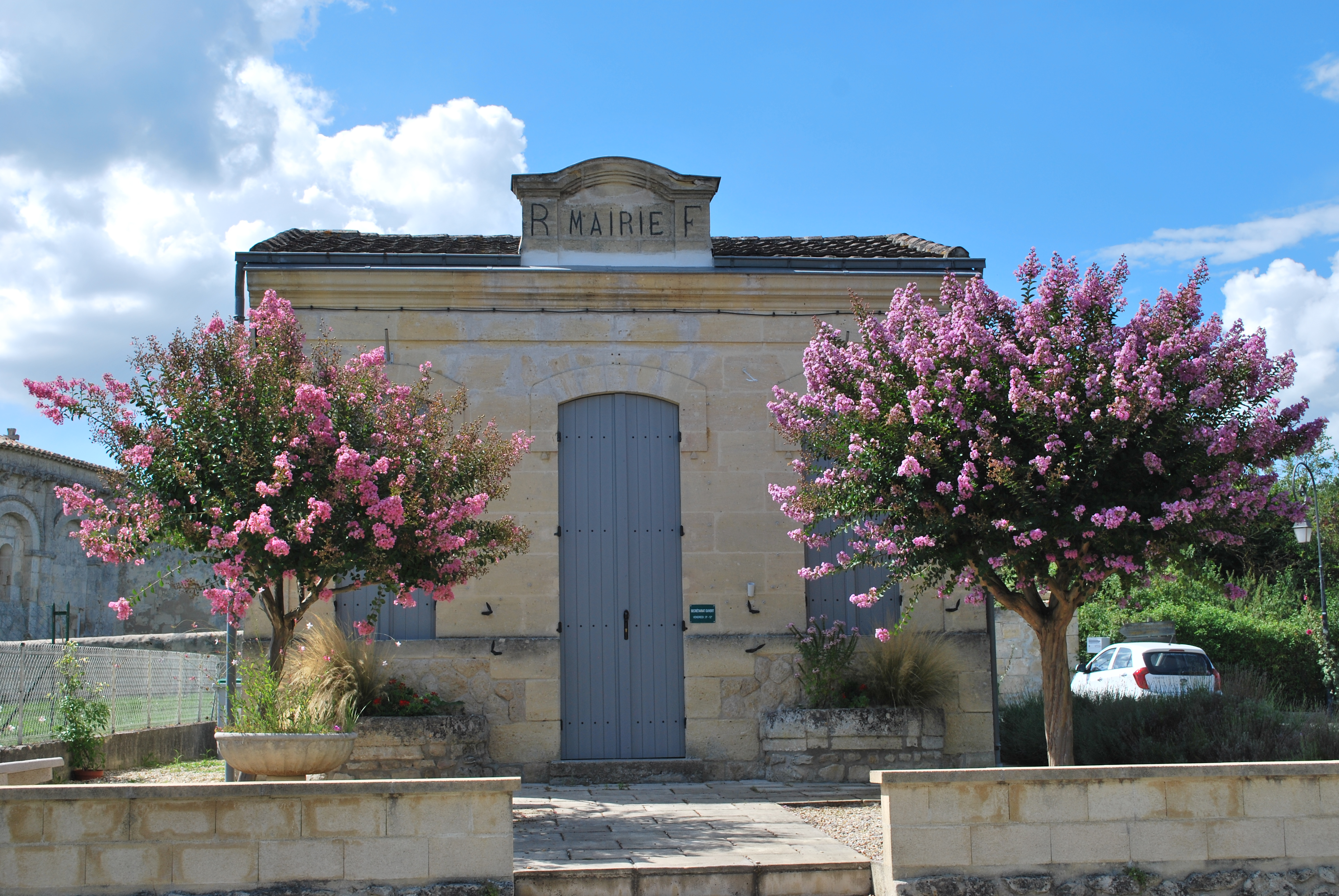
- The town hall in Mouillac
- Location of Mouillac
- Location within France Location within Nouvelle-Aquitaine
- Coordinates: 45°00′32″N 0°21′06″W
- Country: France
- Region: Nouvelle-Aquitaine
- Department: Gironde
- Arrondissement: Libourne
- Canton: Le Libournais-Fronsadais
- Intercommunality: Fronsadais

Government
  - Mayor (2020–2026): Marie-France Regis
- Area^{1}: 1.87 km^{2} (0.72 sq mi)
- Elevation: 90 m (300 ft)
- Highest elevation: 64 m (210 ft)
- Lowest elevation: 27 m (89 ft)
- Population (2023): 90
  - Density: 48/km^{2} (120/sq mi)
- Time zone: UTC+01:00 (CET)
  - Summer (DST): UTC+02:00 (CEST)
- INSEE/Postal code: 33295 /33240
- ^{1} French Land Register data, which excludes lakes, ponds, glaciers > 1 km^{2} (0.386 sq mi or 247 acres) and river estuaries.

Mouillac (French pronunciation: [mujak]; Occitan: Molhac) is a commune in the Gironde department in Nouvelle-Aquitaine in southwestern France.

== Population ==
Historical population
Year	Pop.	±% p.a.
1968	58	—
1975	41	−4.83%
1982	55	+4.29%
1990	72	+3.42%
1999	103	+4.06%
2007	105	+0.24%
2012	98	−1.37%
2017	88	−2.13%
2023	90	+0.38%
Source: INSEE

== See also ==
- Communes of the Gironde department
