= Saint-Germain-de-la-Rivière =

- Commune
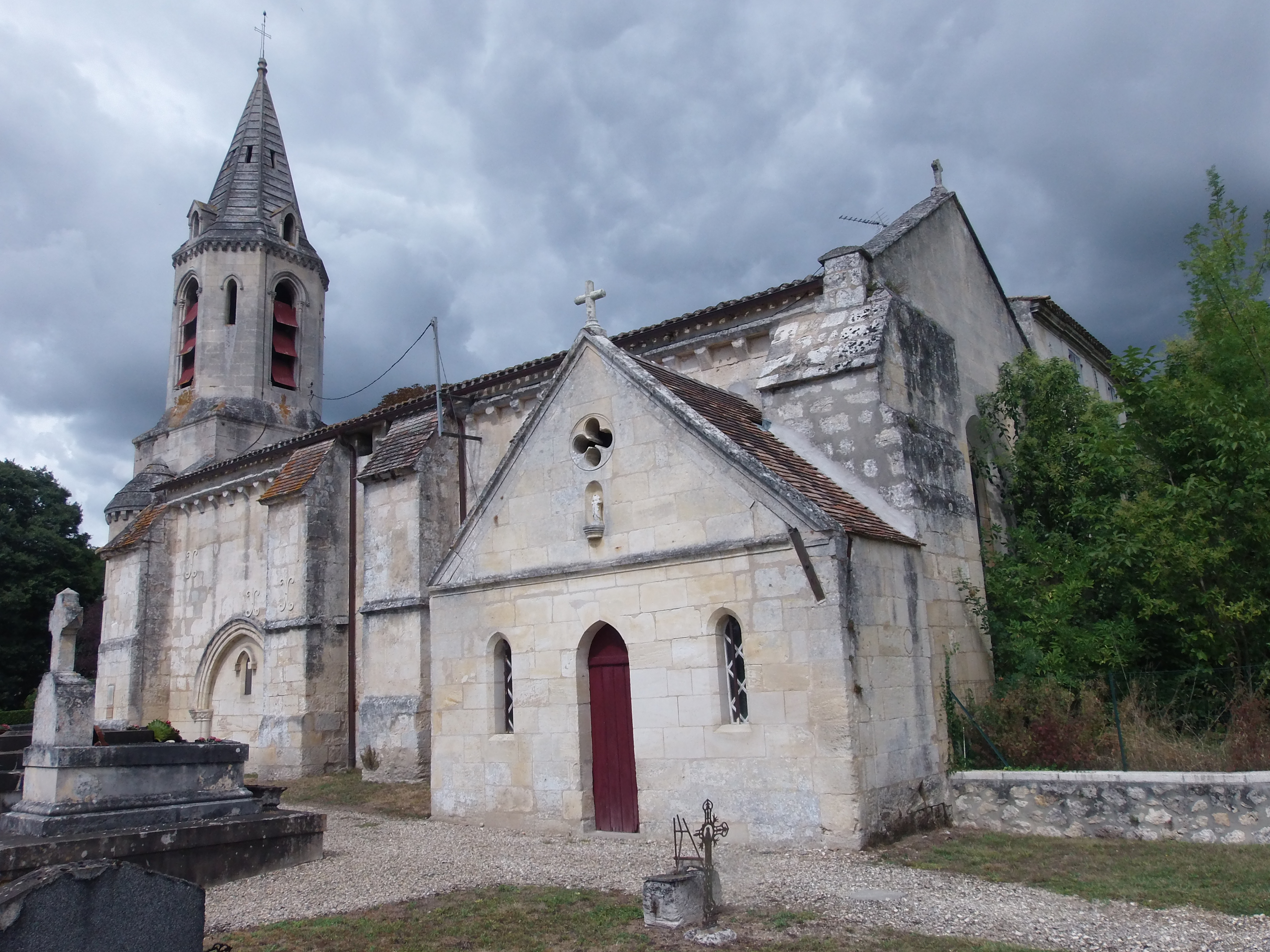
- The church in Saint-Germain-de-la-Rivière
- Location of Saint-Germain-de-la-Rivière
- Location within France Location within Nouvelle-Aquitaine
- Coordinates: 44°56′55″N 0°19′53″W
- Country: France
- Region: Nouvelle-Aquitaine
- Department: Gironde
- Arrondissement: Libourne
- Canton: Le Libournais-Fronsadais
- Intercommunality: Fronsadais

Government
  - Mayor (2020–2026): Philippe Duverger
- Area^{1}: 4.28 km^{2} (1.65 sq mi)
- Elevation: 69 m (226 ft)
- Highest elevation: 80 m (260 ft)
- Lowest elevation: 1 m (3.3 ft)
- Population (2023): 392
  - Density: 91.6/km^{2} (237/sq mi)
- Time zone: UTC+01:00 (CET)
  - Summer (DST): UTC+02:00 (CEST)
- INSEE/Postal code: 33414 /33240
- ^{1} French Land Register data, which excludes lakes, ponds, glaciers > 1 km^{2} (0.386 sq mi or 247 acres) and river estuaries.

Saint-Germain-de-la-Rivière (French pronunciation: [sɛ̃ ʒɛʁmɛ̃ də la ʁivjɛʁ], literally Saint-Germain of the River; Occitan: Sent German de la Ribèra) is a commune in the Gironde department in Nouvelle-Aquitaine in southwestern France.

== Population ==
Historical population
Year	Pop.	±% p.a.
1968	374	—
1975	340	−1.35%
1982	303	−1.63%
1990	314	+0.45%
1999	339	+0.85%
2007	326	−0.49%
2012	387	+3.49%
2017	386	−0.05%
2023	392	+0.26%
Source: INSEE

== See also ==
- Communes of the Gironde department
