= La Rivière, Gironde =

La Rivière
- Commune
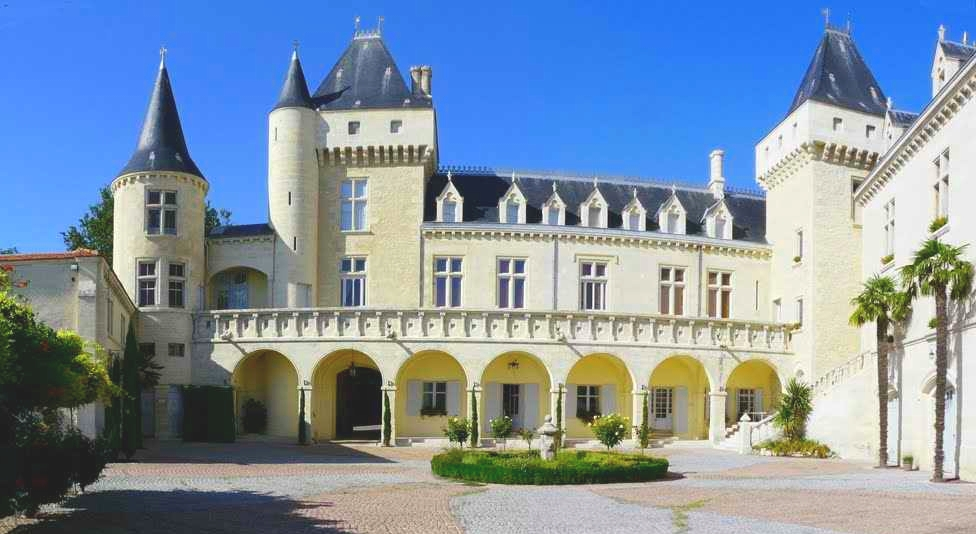
- Chateau

- Coat of arms
- Location of La Rivière
- Location within France Location within Nouvelle-Aquitaine
- Coordinates: 44°56′08″N 0°18′31″W
- Country: France
- Region: Nouvelle-Aquitaine
- Department: Gironde
- Arrondissement: Libourne
- Canton: Le Libournais-Fronsadais
- Intercommunality: Fronsadais

Government
  - Mayor (2020–2026): Dominique Beyly
- Area^{1}: 3.22 km^{2} (1.24 sq mi)
- Elevation: 10 m (33 ft)
- Highest elevation: 78 m (256 ft)
- Lowest elevation: 2 m (6.6 ft)
- Population (2023): 409
  - Density: 127/km^{2} (329/sq mi)
- Time zone: UTC+01:00 (CET)
  - Summer (DST): UTC+02:00 (CEST)
- INSEE/Postal code: 33356 /33126
- ^{1} French Land Register data, which excludes lakes, ponds, glaciers > 1 km^{2} (0.386 sq mi or 247 acres) and river estuaries.

La Rivière (French pronunciation: [la ʁivjɛʁ]; Occitan: La Ribèra) is a commune in the Gironde department in Nouvelle-Aquitaine in southwestern France.

== Population ==
Historical population
| Year | Pop. | ±% p.a. |
|---|---|---|
| 1968 | 310 | — |
| 1975 | 350 | +1.75% |
| 1982 | 367 | +0.68% |
| 1990 | 322 | −1.62% |
| 1999 | 321 | −0.03% |
| 2007 | 324 | +0.12% |
| 2012 | 363 | +2.30% |
| 2017 | 423 | +3.11% |
| 2023 | 409 | −0.56% |
Source: INSEE

== See also ==
- Communes of the Gironde department
