= Galgon =

- Commune
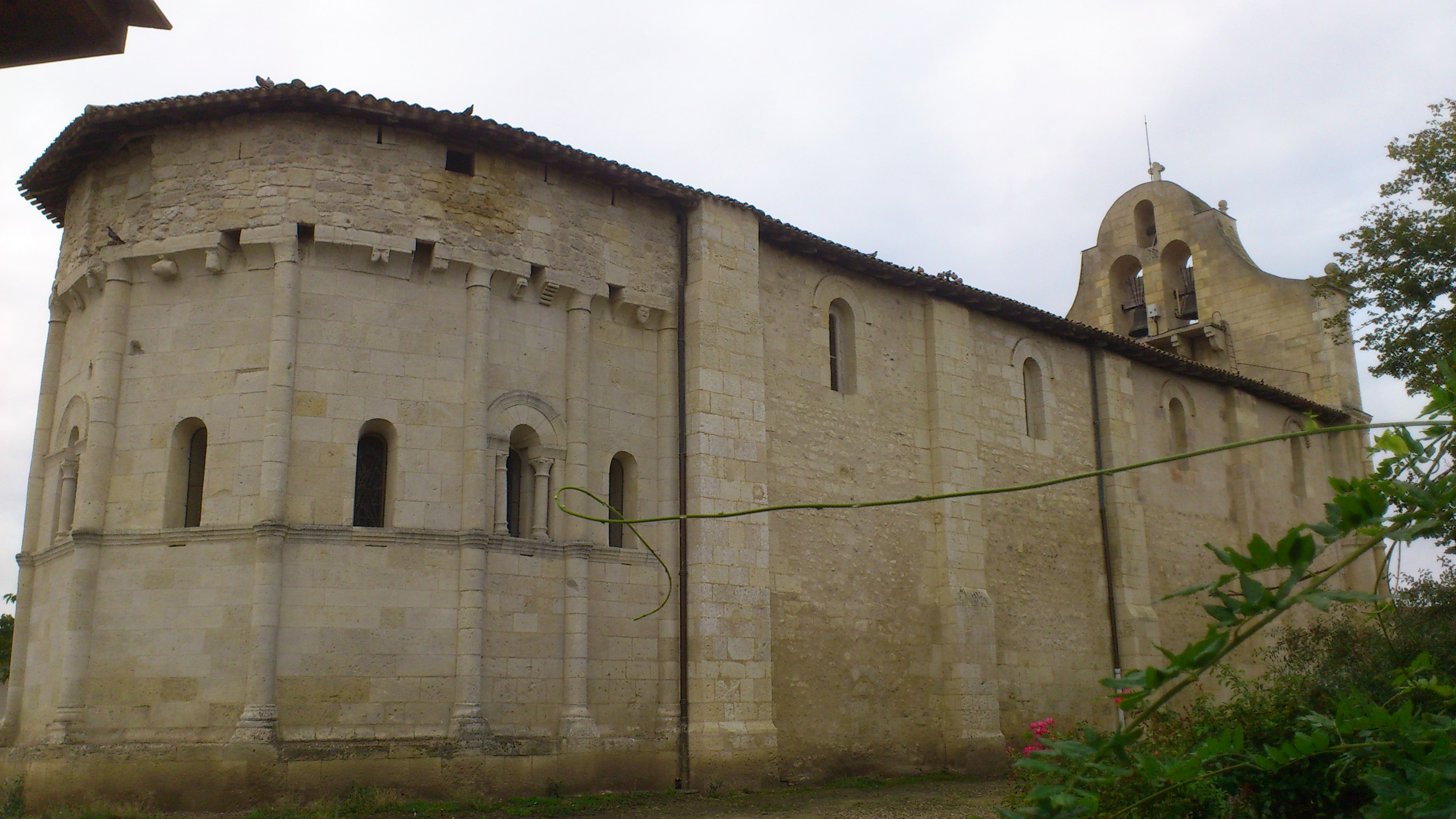
- The church of Saint-Seurin in Galgon
- Location of Galgon
- Location within France Location within Nouvelle-Aquitaine
- Coordinates: 44°59′32″N 0°16′17″W
- Country: France
- Region: Nouvelle-Aquitaine
- Department: Gironde
- Arrondissement: Libourne
- Canton: Le Libournais-Fronsadais

Government
  - Mayor (2020–2026): Jean-Marie Bayard
- Area^{1}: 15.18 km^{2} (5.86 sq mi)
- Elevation: 7 m (23 ft)
- Highest elevation: 56 m (184 ft)
- Lowest elevation: 2 m (6.6 ft)
- Population (2023): 3,144
  - Density: 207.1/km^{2} (536.4/sq mi)
- Time zone: UTC+01:00 (CET)
  - Summer (DST): UTC+02:00 (CEST)
- INSEE/Postal code: 33179 /33133
- ^{1} French Land Register data, which excludes lakes, ponds, glaciers > 1 km^{2} (0.386 sq mi or 247 acres) and river estuaries.

Galgon (French pronunciation: [ɡalɡɔ̃]) is a commune in the Gironde department in southwestern France.

== Population ==
Historical population
Year	Pop.	±% p.a.
1968	1,106	—
1975	1,522	+4.67%
1982	2,323	+6.23%
1990	2,514	+0.99%
1999	2,435	−0.35%
2007	2,496	+0.31%
2012	2,941	+3.34%
2017	3,014	+0.49%
2023	3,144	+0.71%
Source: INSEE

== See also ==
- Communes of the Gironde department
