= Fronsac, Gironde =

Fronsac
- Commune
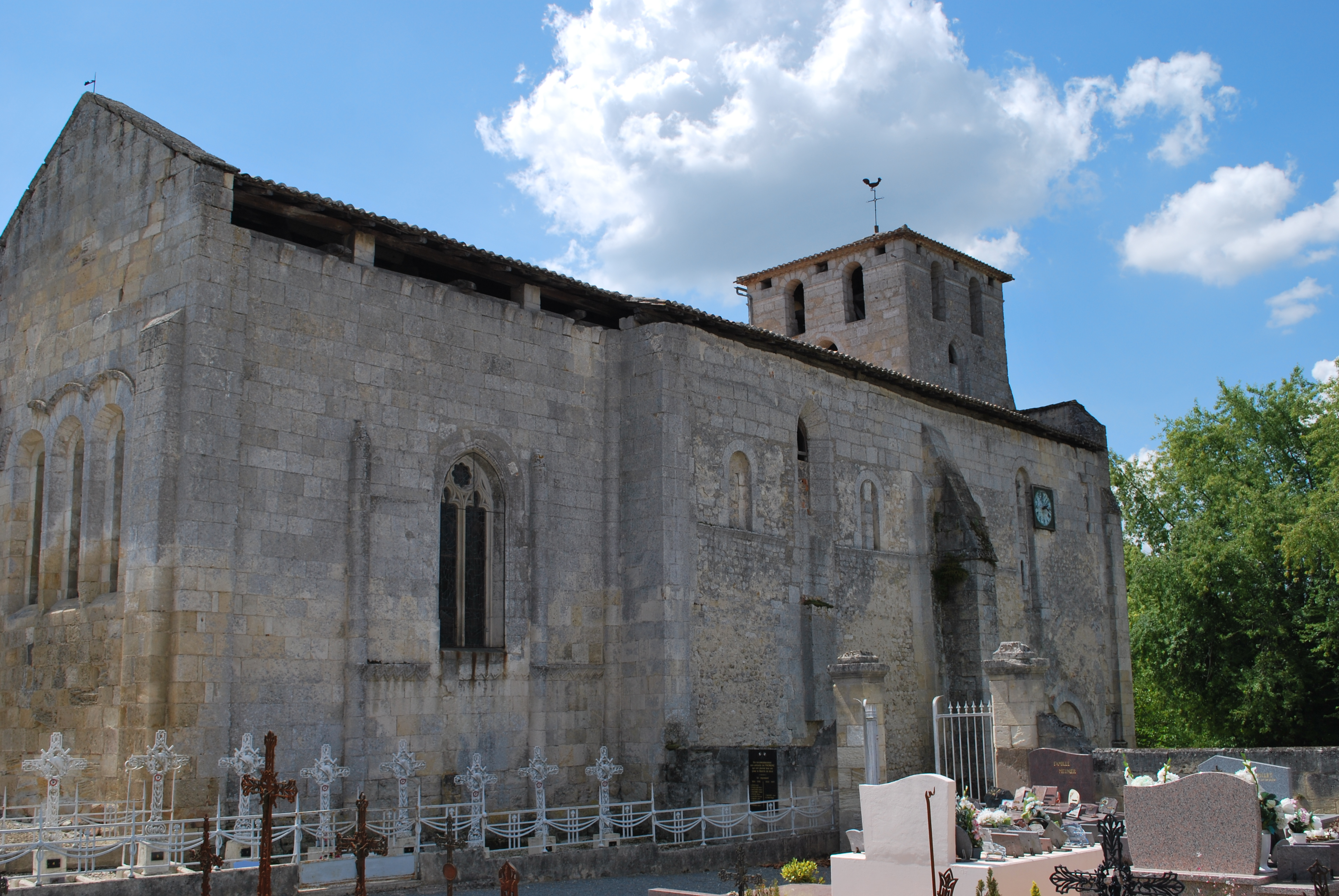
- The church in Fronsac

- Coat of arms
- Location of Fronsac
- Location within France Location within Nouvelle-Aquitaine
- Coordinates: 44°55′30″N 0°16′19″W
- Country: France
- Region: Nouvelle-Aquitaine
- Department: Gironde
- Arrondissement: Libourne
- Canton: Le Libournais-Fronsadais
- Intercommunality: Fronsadais

Government
  - Mayor (2020–2026): Marcel Durant
- Area^{1}: 15.29 km^{2} (5.90 sq mi)
- Elevation: 30 m (98 ft)
- Highest elevation: 84 m (276 ft)
- Lowest elevation: 1 m (3.3 ft)
- Population (2023): 1,130
  - Density: 73.9/km^{2} (191/sq mi)
- Time zone: UTC+01:00 (CET)
  - Summer (DST): UTC+02:00 (CEST)
- INSEE/Postal code: 33174 /33126
- ^{1} French Land Register data, which excludes lakes, ponds, glaciers > 1 km^{2} (0.386 sq mi or 247 acres) and river estuaries.

Fronsac (French pronunciation: [fʁɔ̃sak]; Occitan: Fronçac) is a commune in the Gironde department in the Nouvelle-Aquitaine region in southwestern France. The town gave its name to the Fronsac AOC wine.

== Geography ==
The commune is situated in the Fronsadais and is bordered on the south by the river Dordogne and on the east by the river Isle, which separates it from Libourne. Fronsac is 40 km northeast of Bordeaux and 5 km northwest of Libourne and the Saint-Émilion and Pomerol appellations.

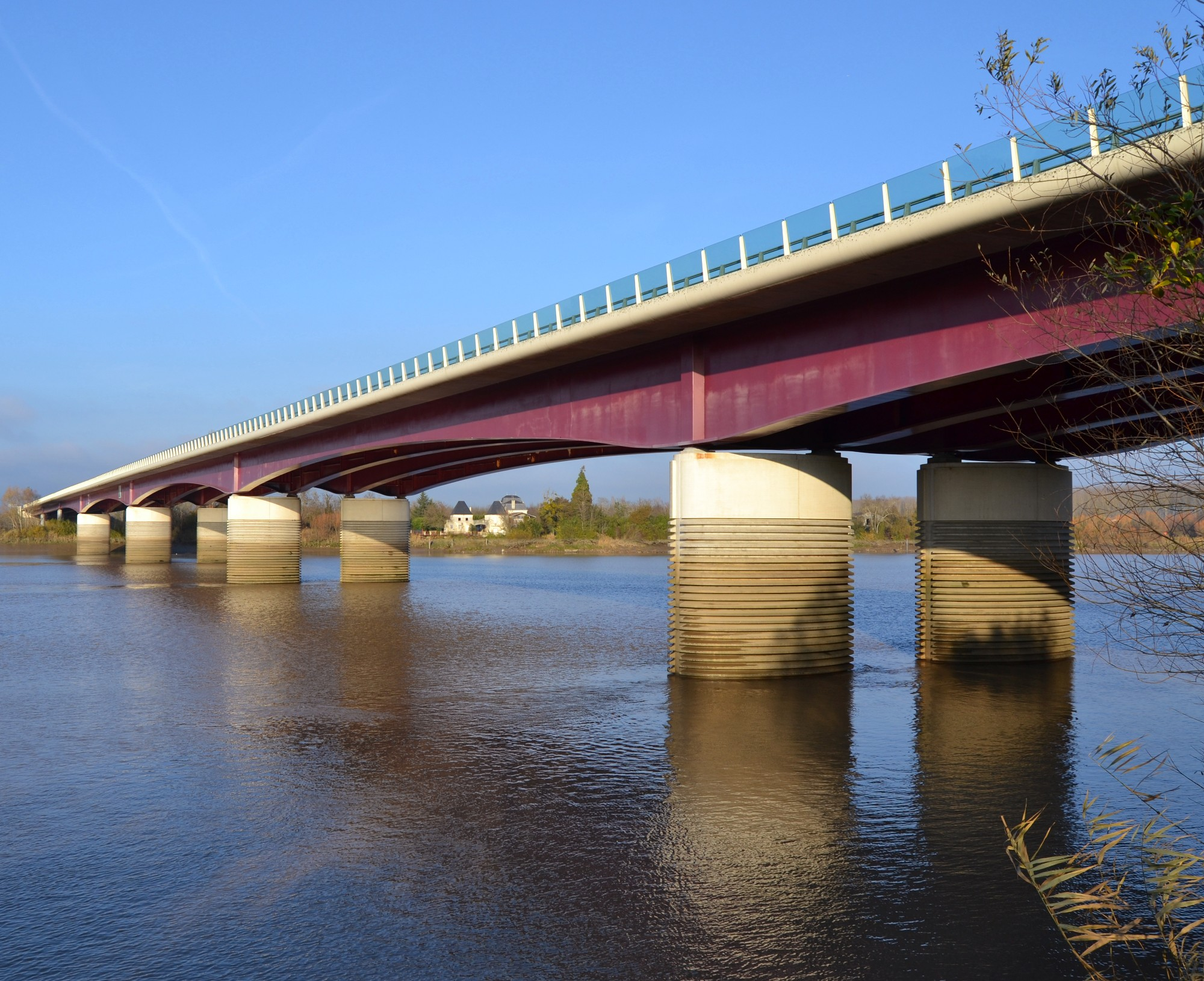
The tidal bore's viaduct allows the A89 motorway to cross the Dordogne, between Fronsac (on the right bank) and Arveyres

== History ==
Fronsac's mound owes its history to its privileged position. It was the site of the Gauls' market, the Romans erected an altar there, and Charlemagne built a fortified camp on the mound ("Franciacus") in 769, where the Basques led by duke Lupo came to pledge allegiance to the Frankish King after Aquitaine's submission. In 849, Fronsac was pillaged by Hasting, the chief of the Vikings. The Marechal of Richelieu had a "folly" built there, to an extravagant architectural design, where he held courtly entertainments. As word spread of these events, the renown of Fronsac's wines was carried with it to the Court of Versailles. In the 18th Century, the names of Fronsac and Canon Fronsac enjoyed a very good reputation. It was at this time that the concept of "cru" first appeared in the Libournais.

== Population ==
Historical population
Year	Pop.	±% p.a.
1968	1,155	—
1975	1,129	−0.32%
1982	1,170	+0.51%
1990	1,067	−1.15%
1999	1,042	−0.26%
2007	1,043	+0.01%
2012	1,146	+1.90%
2017	1,153	+0.12%
2023	1,130	−0.34%
Source: INSEE

== Administration ==
List of Mayors
Period	Name	Party	Background
1983–present (re-elected in May 2020)	Marcel Durant	The Republicans	Retired farmer

== Sights ==
- Saint-Martin's Church, which is classed as a Monument historique, (historical monument).

== Personalities ==
- Guillaume-Sanche de Pommiers, Sire of Pommiers, Viscount of Fronsac
- Joachim Rouhault de Gamaches

== International Relations ==
- (Italy) Fronsac is twinned with Pasiano di Pordenone.

== Wine ==
Situated on the right bank of the Gironde River, the commune is an appellation in itself, as well as a sub-appellation, Canon-Fronsac AOC.

== See also ==
- Communes of the Gironde department
- Guyenne
- Plan Bordeaux
- Bordeaux wine regions
