= Saillans, Gironde =

Saillans
- Commune
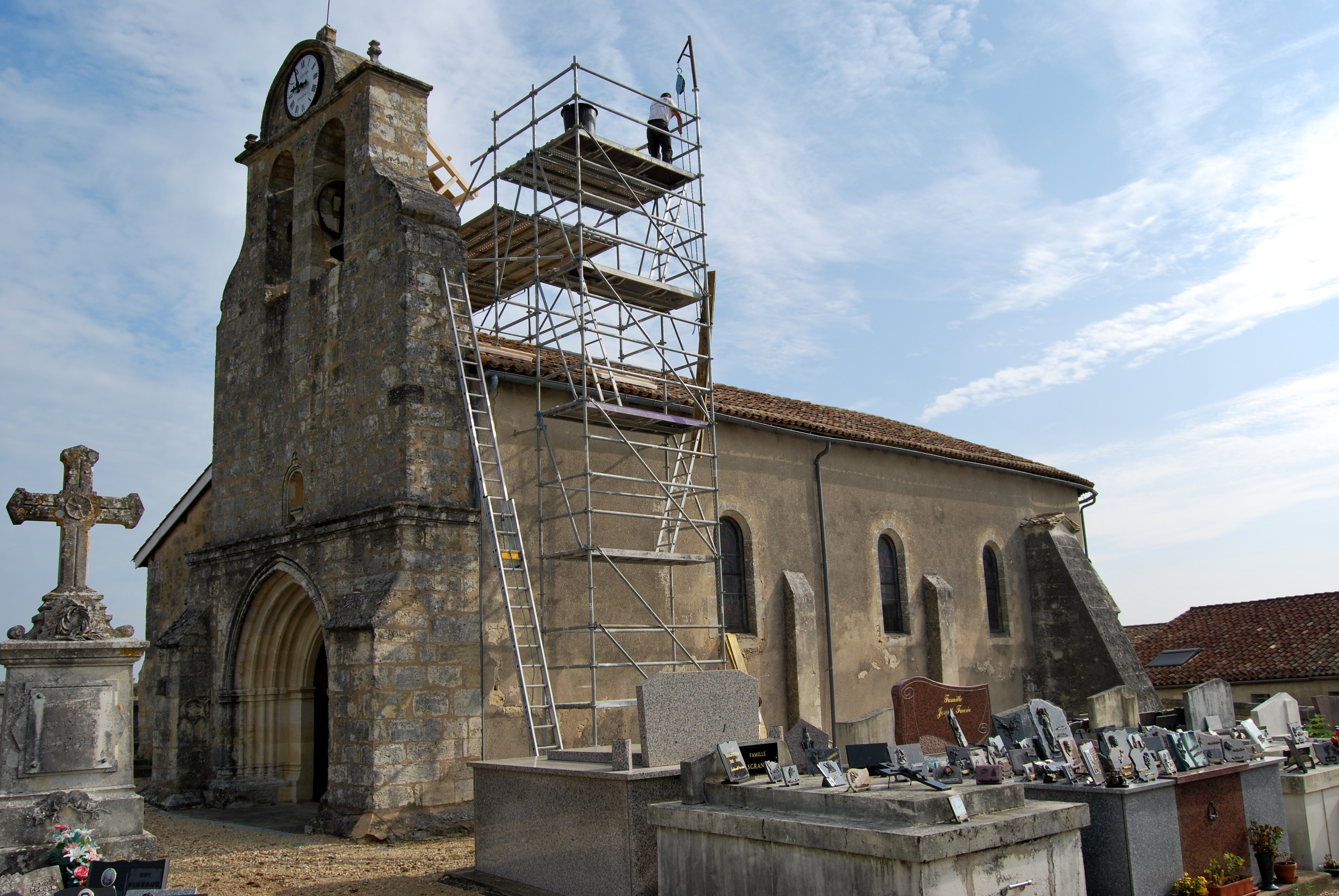
- The church in Saillans

- Coat of arms
- Location of Saillans
- Location within France Location within Nouvelle-Aquitaine
- Coordinates: 44°57′42″N 0°16′29″W
- Country: France
- Region: Nouvelle-Aquitaine
- Department: Gironde
- Arrondissement: Libourne
- Canton: Le Libournais-Fronsadais
- Intercommunality: Fronsadais

Government
  - Mayor (2020–2026): Martine Tillet-Faurie
- Area^{1}: 6.22 km^{2} (2.40 sq mi)
- Elevation: 45 m (148 ft)
- Highest elevation: 80 m (260 ft)
- Lowest elevation: 2 m (6.6 ft)
- Population (2023): 369
  - Density: 59.3/km^{2} (154/sq mi)
- Time zone: UTC+01:00 (CET)
  - Summer (DST): UTC+02:00 (CEST)
- INSEE/Postal code: 33364 /33141
- ^{1} French Land Register data, which excludes lakes, ponds, glaciers > 1 km^{2} (0.386 sq mi or 247 acres) and river estuaries.

Saillans (Occitan: Salhans) is a commune in the Gironde department in Nouvelle-Aquitaine in southwestern France.

== Population ==
Historical population
Year	Pop.	±% p.a.
1968	390	—
1975	348	−1.61%
1982	422	+2.79%
1990	407	−0.45%
1999	362	−1.29%
2007	405	+1.41%
2012	366	−2.00%
2017	403	+1.94%
2023	369	−1.46%
Source: INSEE

== See also ==
- Communes of the Gironde department
