= Le Fieu =

- Commune
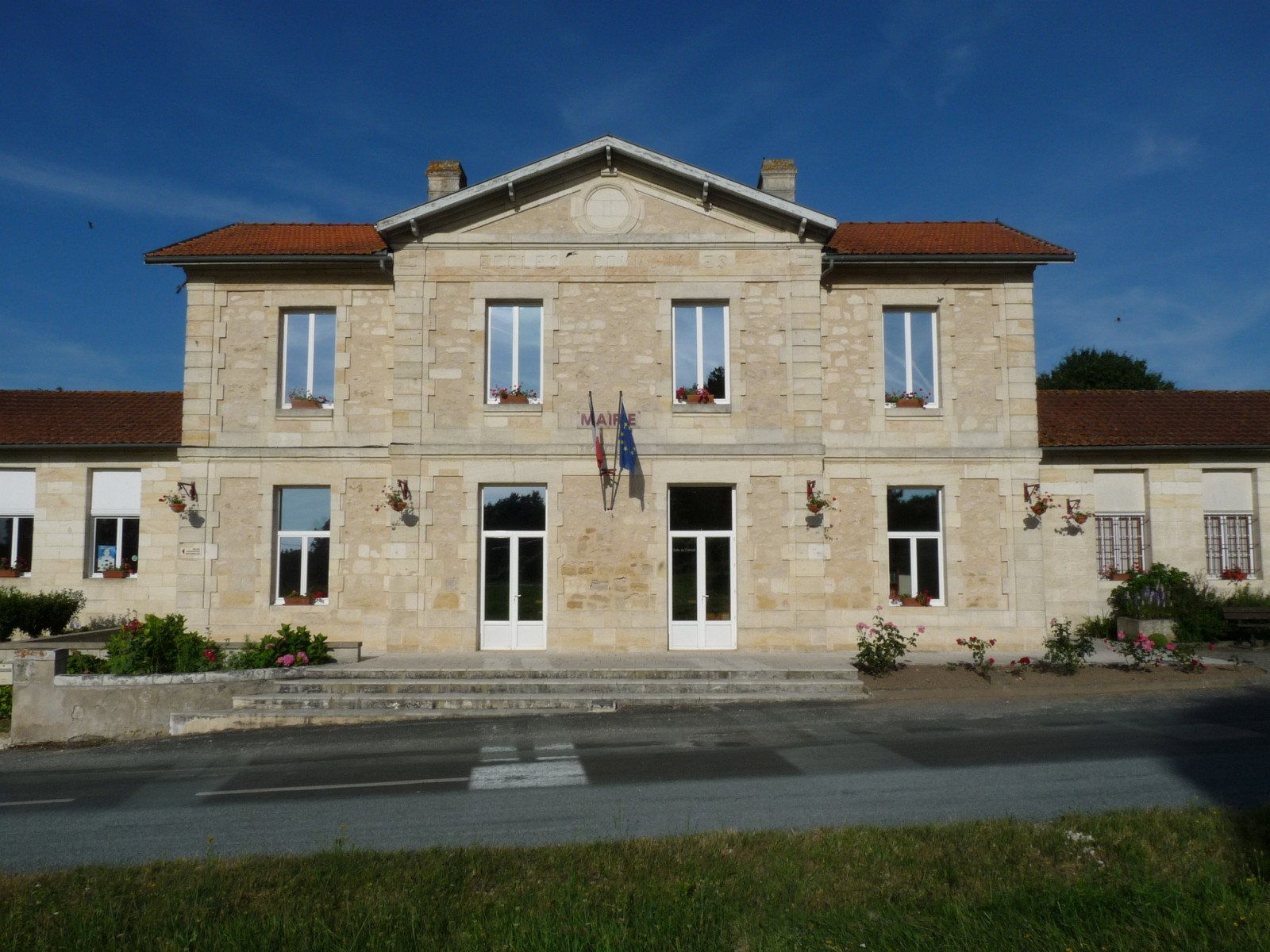
- The town hall in Le Fieu
- Location of Le Fieu
- Location within France Location within Nouvelle-Aquitaine
- Coordinates: 45°03′37″N 0°01′57″W
- Country: France
- Region: Nouvelle-Aquitaine
- Department: Gironde
- Arrondissement: Libourne
- Canton: Le Nord-Libournais
- Intercommunality: CA Libournais

Government
  - Mayor (2020–2026): Michel Vacher
- Area^{1}: 14.67 km^{2} (5.66 sq mi)
- Elevation: 87 m (285 ft)
- Highest elevation: 91 m (299 ft)
- Lowest elevation: 24 m (79 ft)
- Population (2023): 505
  - Density: 34.4/km^{2} (89.2/sq mi)
- Time zone: UTC+01:00 (CET)
  - Summer (DST): UTC+02:00 (CEST)
- INSEE/Postal code: 33166 /33230
- ^{1} French Land Register data, which excludes lakes, ponds, glaciers > 1 km^{2} (0.386 sq mi or 247 acres) and river estuaries.

Le Fieu (French pronunciation: [lə fjø]; Occitan: Lo Filh) is a commune in the Gironde department in Nouvelle-Aquitaine in southwestern France.

== Geography ==
Le Fieu is about 49 km to the northeast of Bordeaux and around 23 km to the Northeast of Libourne. The commune borders the commune of Les Églisottes-et-Chalaures in the North, Saint-Christophe-de-Double in the Northeast, Porchères in the Southeast, Coutras in the South and Southeast and Les Peintures in the West.

== Population ==
Historical population
Year	Pop.	±% p.a.
1968	465	—
1975	378	−2.92%
1982	366	−0.46%
1990	379	+0.44%
1999	373	−0.18%
2007	467	+2.85%
2012	507	+1.66%
2017	523	+0.62%
2023	505	−0.58%
Source: INSEE

== See also ==
- Communes of the Gironde department
