= Saint-Denis-de-Pile =

- Commune
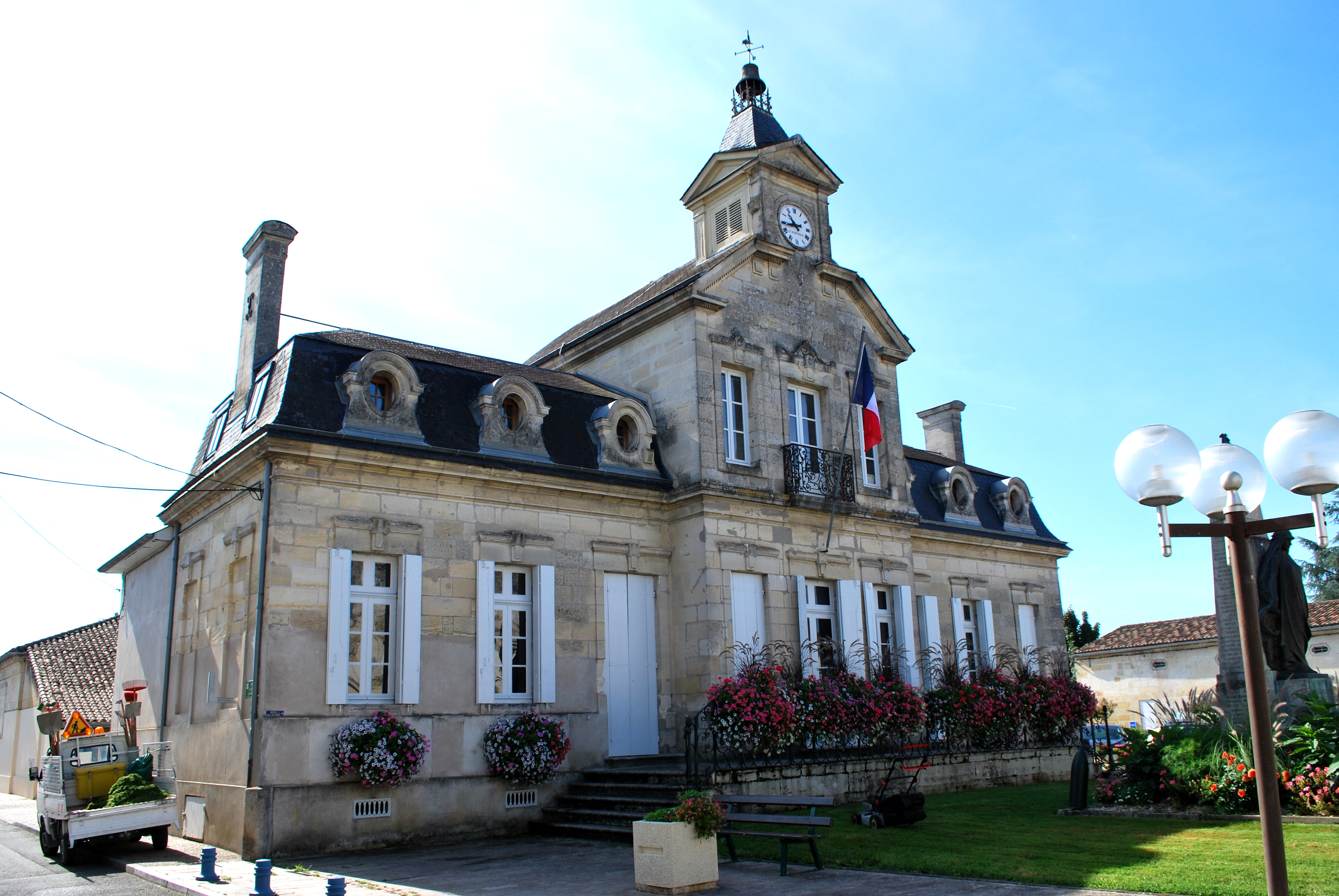
- The town hall in Saint-Denis-de-Pile
- Location of Saint-Denis-de-Pile
- Location within France Location within Nouvelle-Aquitaine
- Coordinates: 44°59′33″N 0°12′18″W
- Country: France
- Region: Nouvelle-Aquitaine
- Department: Gironde
- Arrondissement: Libourne
- Canton: Le Nord-Libournais
- Intercommunality: CA Libournais

Government
  - Mayor (2020–2026): Fabienne Fonteneau
- Area^{1}: 28.27 km^{2} (10.92 sq mi)
- Highest elevation: 49 m (161 ft)
- Lowest elevation: 2 m (6.6 ft)
- Population (2023): 5,955
  - Density: 210.6/km^{2} (545.6/sq mi)
- Time zone: UTC+01:00 (CET)
  - Summer (DST): UTC+02:00 (CEST)
- INSEE/Postal code: 33393 /33910
- ^{1} French Land Register data, which excludes lakes, ponds, glaciers > 1 km^{2} (0.386 sq mi or 247 acres) and river estuaries.

Saint-Denis-de-Pile (French pronunciation: [sɛ̃ dəni də pil]; Occitan: Sant Denis de Bateria) is a commune in the Gironde department in Nouvelle-Aquitaine in southwestern France. It is situated approximately 9 kilometres (6 mi) north of Libourne on the eastern side of the river Isle.

== Geography ==
The commune borders in the North and West are set by the river Isle. Saint-Denis-de-Pile borders the commune Sablons in the North, Abzac in the Northeast, Les Artigues-de-Lussac and Montagne in the Southeast, Lalande-de-Pomerol in the South, Savignac-d’Isle in the West und Bonzac in the Nortwesr.

== Population ==
Historical population

Year	Pop.	±% p.a.
1793	1,883	—
1866	2,762	+0.53%
1906	2,506	−0.24%
1936	2,183	−0.46%
1954	2,172	−0.03%
1962	2,293	+0.68%
1968	2,371	+0.56%
1975	2,807	+2.44%

Year	Pop.	±% p.a.
1982	3,204	+1.91%
1990	3,909	+2.52%
1999	4,089	+0.50%
2007	4,841	+2.13%
2012	5,227	+1.55%
2017	5,535	+1.15%
2023	5,955	+1.23%

Source: EHESS and INSEE (1968-2023)

== See also ==
- Communes of the Gironde department
