= Saint-Christophe =

Saint-Christophe (French for Saint Christopher) may refer to:

== Places in France ==
=== Auvergne-Rhône-Alpes ===
- Bourg-Saint-Christophe, in the Ain département
- Saint-Christophe-en-Bourbonnais, in the Allier département
- Saint-Christophe-et-le-Laris, in the Drôme département
- Saint-Christophe-d'Allier, in the Haute-Loire département
- Saint-Christophe-sur-Dolaizon, in the Haute-Loire département
- Saint-Christophe-en-Oisans, in the Isère département
- Saint-Christophe-sur-Guiers, in the Isère département
- Villard-Saint-Christophe, in the Isère département
- Saint-Christophe, Rhône, in the Rhône département
- Saint-Christophe, Savoie, in the Savoie département

=== Bourgoigne-Franche-Comté ===
- Saint-Christophe-en-Bresse, in the Saône-et-Loire département
- Saint-Christophe-en-Brionnais, in the Saône-et-Loire département

=== Brittany ===
- Saint-Christophe-des-Bois, in the Ille-et-Vilaine département
- Saint-Christophe-de-Valains, in the Ille-et-Vilaine département

=== Centre-Val de Loire ===
- Saint-Christophe-le-Chaudry, in the Cher département
- Saint-Christophe, Eure-et-Loir, in the Eure-et-Loir département
- Saint-Christophe-en-Bazelle, in the Indre département
- Saint-Christophe-en-Boucherie, in the Indre département
- Saint-Christophe-sur-le-Nais, in the Indre-et-Loire département

=== Grand Est ===
- Saint-Christophe-Dodinicourt, in the Aube département
- Lay-Saint-Christophe, in the Meurthe-et-Moselle département

=== Hauts-de-France ===
- Saint-Christophe-à-Berry, in the Aisne département
- Bray-Saint-Christophe, in the Aisne département
- Villers-Saint-Christophe, in the Aisne département

=== Normandy ===
- Saint-Christophe-sur-Avre, in the Eure département
- Saint-Christophe-sur-Condé, in the Eure département
- Saint-Christophe-du-Foc, in the Manche département
- Saint-Christophe-de-Chaulieu, in the Orne département

=== Nouvelle-Aquitaine ===
- Saint-Christophe, Charente, in the Charente département
- Saint-Christophe, Charente-Maritime, in the Charente-Maritime département
- Saint-Christophe, Creuse, in the Creuse département
- Saint-Christophe-sur-Roc, in the Deux-Sèvres département
- Saint-Christophe-de-Double, in the Gironde département
- Saint-Christophe-des-Bardes, in the Gironde département
- Saint-Christophe, Vienne, in the Vienne département

=== Occitania ===
- Saint-Christophe-Vallon, in the Aveyron département
- Saint-Christophe, Tarn, in the Tarn département

=== Pays de la Loire ===
- Saint-Christophe-du-Bois, in the Maine-et-Loire département
- Saint-Christophe-la-Couperie, in the Maine-et-Loire département
- Saint-Christophe-du-Luat, in the Mayenne département
- Saint-Christophe-le-Jajolet, former commune in the Orne département
- Saint-Christophe-du-Jambet, in the Sarthe département
- Saint-Christophe-en-Champagne, in the Sarthe département
- Saint-Christophe-du-Ligneron, in the Vendée département

== Places in Italy ==
- Saint-Christophe, Aosta Valley

== Places in Canada ==
- Saint-Christophe-d'Arthabaska

== Islands ==
- Saint Kitts island in the West Indies, also known as Saint-Christophe, namely during the French colonial era 1538-1783
- Saint Christopher Island (disambiguation), any of several islands
- former name of Juan de Nova Island, Indian Ocean

== Sports ==
- A.S.D. Vallée d’Aoste Saint-Christophe, football club based in Saint-Christophe, Aosta Valley, Italy
