= Maransin =

Maransin may refer to:

- Maransin, a French town of the département of Gironde,
- Jean-Pierre Maransin (1770–1828), French general.
