= Saint-Sauveur-de-Puynormand =

- Commune
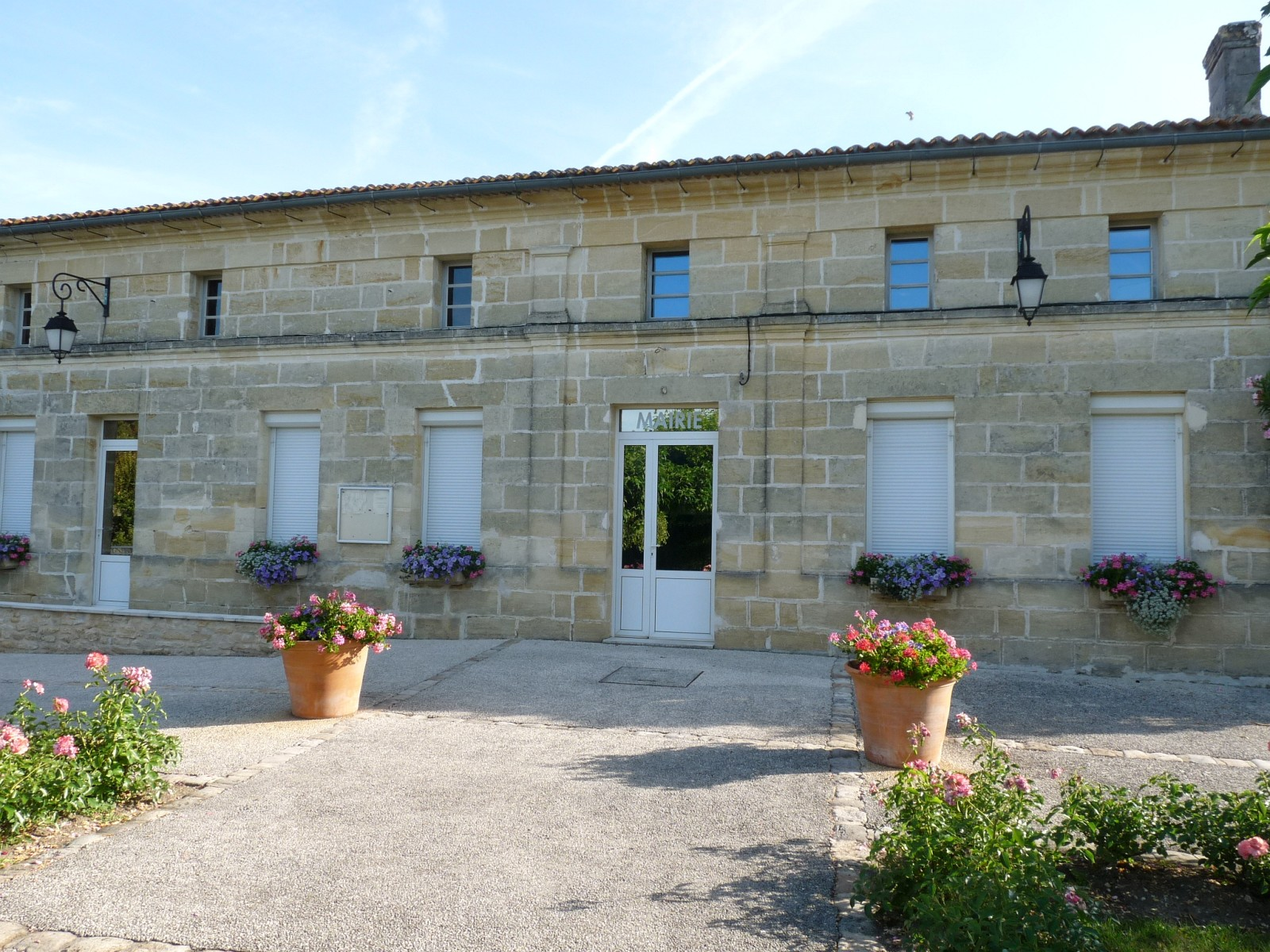
- The town hall in Saint-Sauveur-de-Puynormand

- Coat of arms
- Location of Saint-Sauveur-de-Puynormand
- Location within France Location within Nouvelle-Aquitaine
- Coordinates: 44°59′56″N 0°02′05″W
- Country: France
- Region: Nouvelle-Aquitaine
- Department: Gironde
- Arrondissement: Libourne
- Canton: Le Nord-Libournais
- Intercommunality: CA Libournais

Government
  - Mayor (2020–2026): Gérard Moulinier
- Area^{1}: 5.57 km^{2} (2.15 sq mi)
- Elevation: 45 m (148 ft)
- Highest elevation: 93 m (305 ft)
- Lowest elevation: 19 m (62 ft)
- Population (2023): 369
  - Density: 66.2/km^{2} (172/sq mi)
- Time zone: UTC+01:00 (CET)
  - Summer (DST): UTC+02:00 (CEST)
- INSEE/Postal code: 33472 /33660
- ^{1} French Land Register data, which excludes lakes, ponds, glaciers > 1 km^{2} (0.386 sq mi or 247 acres) and river estuaries.

Saint-Sauveur-de-Puynormand (French pronunciation: [sɛ̃ sovœʁ də pɥinɔʁmɑ̃], literally Saint-Sauveur of Puynormand; Occitan: Sant Savior de Pueinarmand) is a commune in the Gironde department in Nouvelle-Aquitaine in southwestern France.

== Population ==
Historical population
Year	Pop.	±% p.a.
1968	146	—
1975	162	+1.50%
1982	245	+6.09%
1990	340	+4.18%
1999	361	+0.67%
2007	403	+1.39%
2012	422	+0.93%
2017	348	−3.78%
2023	369	+0.98%
Source: INSEE

== See also ==
- Communes of the Gironde department
