= Tizac-de-Lapouyade =

- Commune
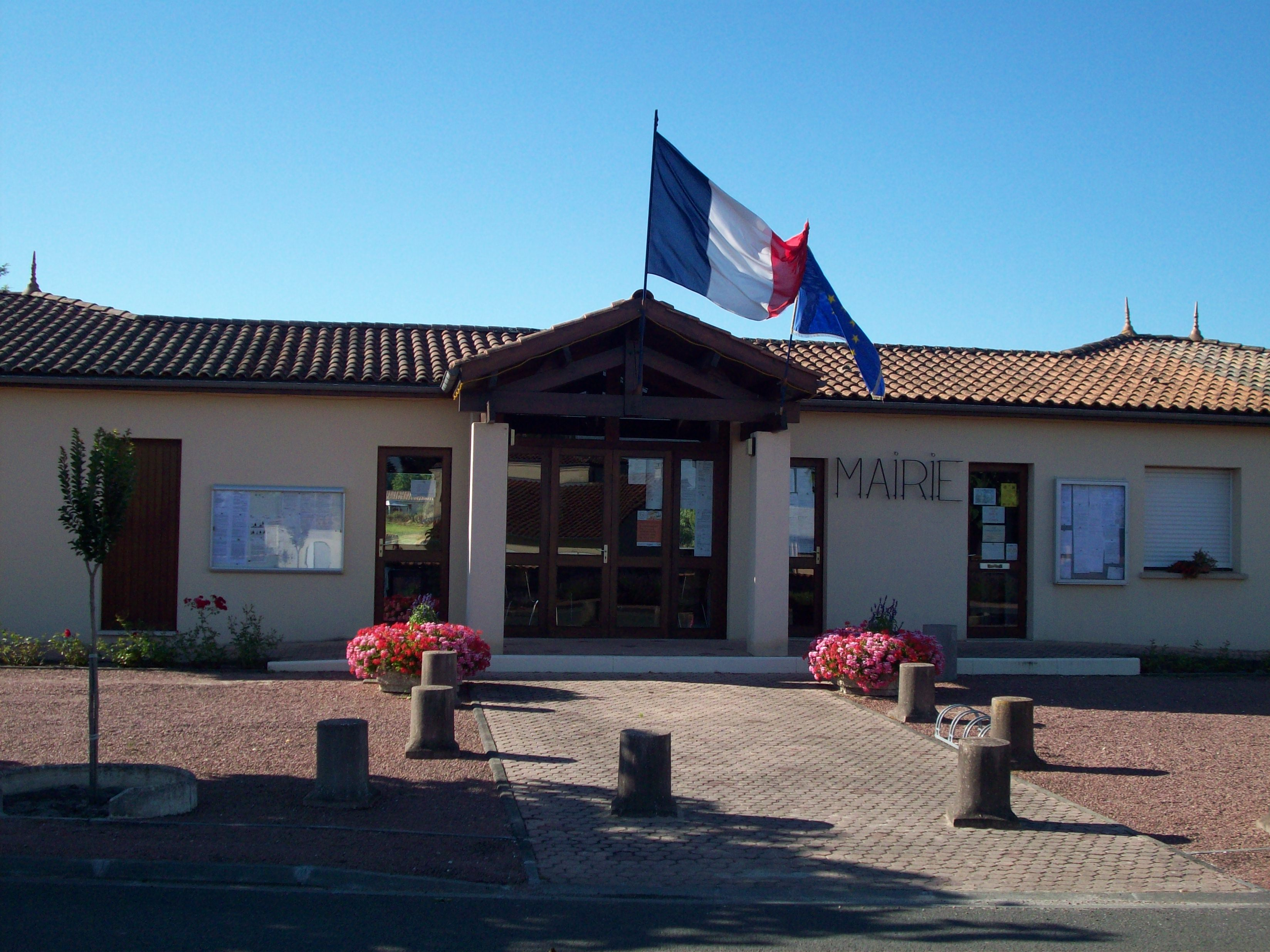
- The town hall in Tizac-de-Lapouyade

- Coat of arms
- Location of Tizac-de-Lapouyade
- Location within France Location within Nouvelle-Aquitaine
- Coordinates: 45°04′27″N 0°18′14″W
- Country: France
- Region: Nouvelle-Aquitaine
- Department: Gironde
- Arrondissement: Libourne
- Canton: Le Nord-Libournais
- Intercommunality: CA Libournais

Government
  - Mayor (2020–2026): Pierre-Jean Martinet
- Area^{1}: 3.97 km^{2} (1.53 sq mi)
- Elevation: 40 m (130 ft)
- Highest elevation: 79 m (259 ft)
- Lowest elevation: 15 m (49 ft)
- Population (2023): 477
  - Density: 120/km^{2} (311/sq mi)
- Time zone: UTC+01:00 (CET)
  - Summer (DST): UTC+02:00 (CEST)
- INSEE/Postal code: 33532 /33620
- ^{1} French Land Register data, which excludes lakes, ponds, glaciers > 1 km^{2} (0.386 sq mi or 247 acres) and river estuaries.

Tizac-de-Lapouyade (French pronunciation: [tizak də lapujad], literally Tizac of Lapouyade; Occitan: Tizac de La Pojada) is a commune in the Gironde department in Nouvelle-Aquitaine in southwestern France.

== Population ==
Historical population
Year	Pop.	±% p.a.
1968	317	—
1975	308	−0.41%
1982	339	+1.38%
1990	393	+1.86%
1999	438	+1.21%
2007	474	+0.99%
2012	505	+1.28%
2017	474	−1.26%
2023	477	+0.11%
Source: INSEE

== See also ==
- Communes of the Gironde department
