= Canton of Le Nord-Libournais =

Coordinates: 45.04°N 0.13°W

The canton of Le Nord-Libournais is an administrative division of the Gironde department, southwestern France. It was created at the French canton reorganisation which came into effect in March 2015. Its seat is in Coutras.

It consists of the following communes:

1. Abzac
2. Les Artigues-de-Lussac
3. Bayas
4. Bonzac
5. Camps-sur-l'Isle
6. Chamadelle
7. Coutras
8. Les Églisottes-et-Chalaures
9. Le Fieu
10. Francs
11. Gours
12. Guîtres
13. Lagorce
14. Lapouyade
15. Lussac
16. Maransin
17. Montagne
18. Néac
19. Les Peintures
20. Petit-Palais-et-Cornemps
21. Porchères
22. Puisseguin
23. Puynormand
24. Sablons
25. Saint-Antoine-sur-l'Isle
26. Saint-Christophe-de-Double
27. Saint-Christophe-des-Bardes
28. Saint-Cibard
29. Saint-Ciers-d'Abzac
30. Saint-Denis-de-Pile
31. Saint-Martin-de-Laye
32. Saint-Martin-du-Bois
33. Saint-Médard-de-Guizières
34. Saint-Sauveur-de-Puynormand
35. Saint-Seurin-sur-l'Isle
36. Savignac-de-l'Isle
37. Tayac
38. Tizac-de-Lapouyade
