= Savignac-de-l'Isle =

- Commune
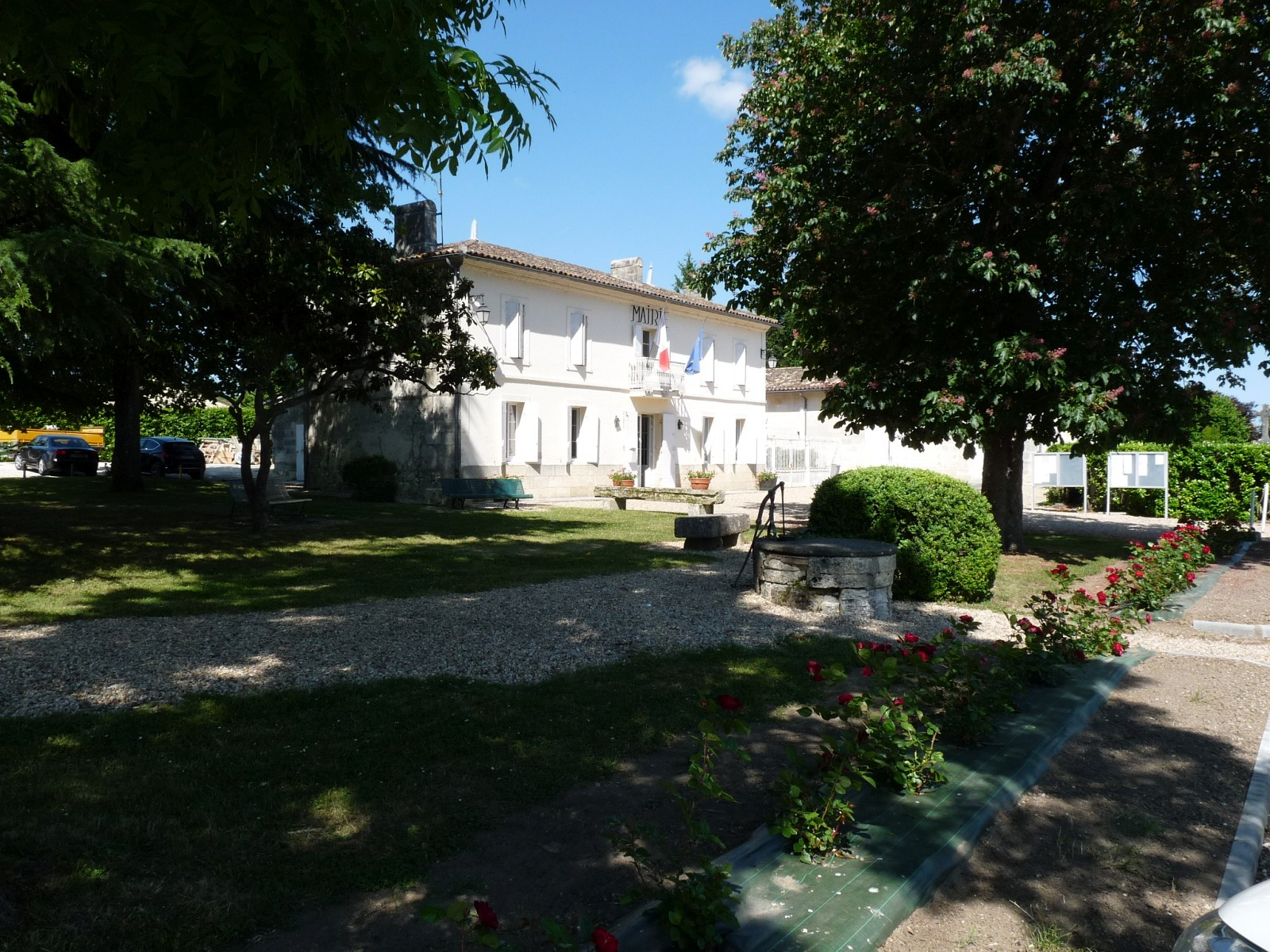
- The town hall in Savignac-de-l'Isle
- Location of Savignac-de-l'Isle
- Location within France Location within Nouvelle-Aquitaine
- Coordinates: 44°59′27″N 0°14′02″W
- Country: France
- Region: Nouvelle-Aquitaine
- Department: Gironde
- Arrondissement: Libourne
- Canton: Le Nord-Libournais
- Intercommunality: CA Libournais

Government
  - Mayor (2020–2026): Chantal Gantch
- Area^{1}: 4.47 km^{2} (1.73 sq mi)
- Elevation: 15 m (49 ft)
- Highest elevation: 60 m (200 ft)
- Lowest elevation: 2 m (6.6 ft)
- Population (2023): 612
  - Density: 137/km^{2} (355/sq mi)
- Time zone: UTC+01:00 (CET)
  - Summer (DST): UTC+02:00 (CEST)
- INSEE/Postal code: 33509 /33910
- ^{1} French Land Register data, which excludes lakes, ponds, glaciers > 1 km^{2} (0.386 sq mi or 247 acres) and river estuaries.

Savignac-de-l'Isle (French pronunciation: [saviɲak də lil], literally Savignac on the Isle; Occitan: Savignac sus l'Eila) is a commune in the Gironde department in Nouvelle-Aquitaine in southwestern France.

== Population ==
Historical population
Year	Pop.	±% p.a.
1968	249	—
1975	310	+3.18%
1982	410	+4.07%
1990	463	+1.53%
1999	476	+0.31%
2007	513	+0.94%
2012	503	−0.39%
2017	504	+0.04%
2023	612	+3.29%
Source: INSEE

== See also ==
- Communes of the Gironde department
