= Saint-Antoine-sur-l'Isle =

- Commune
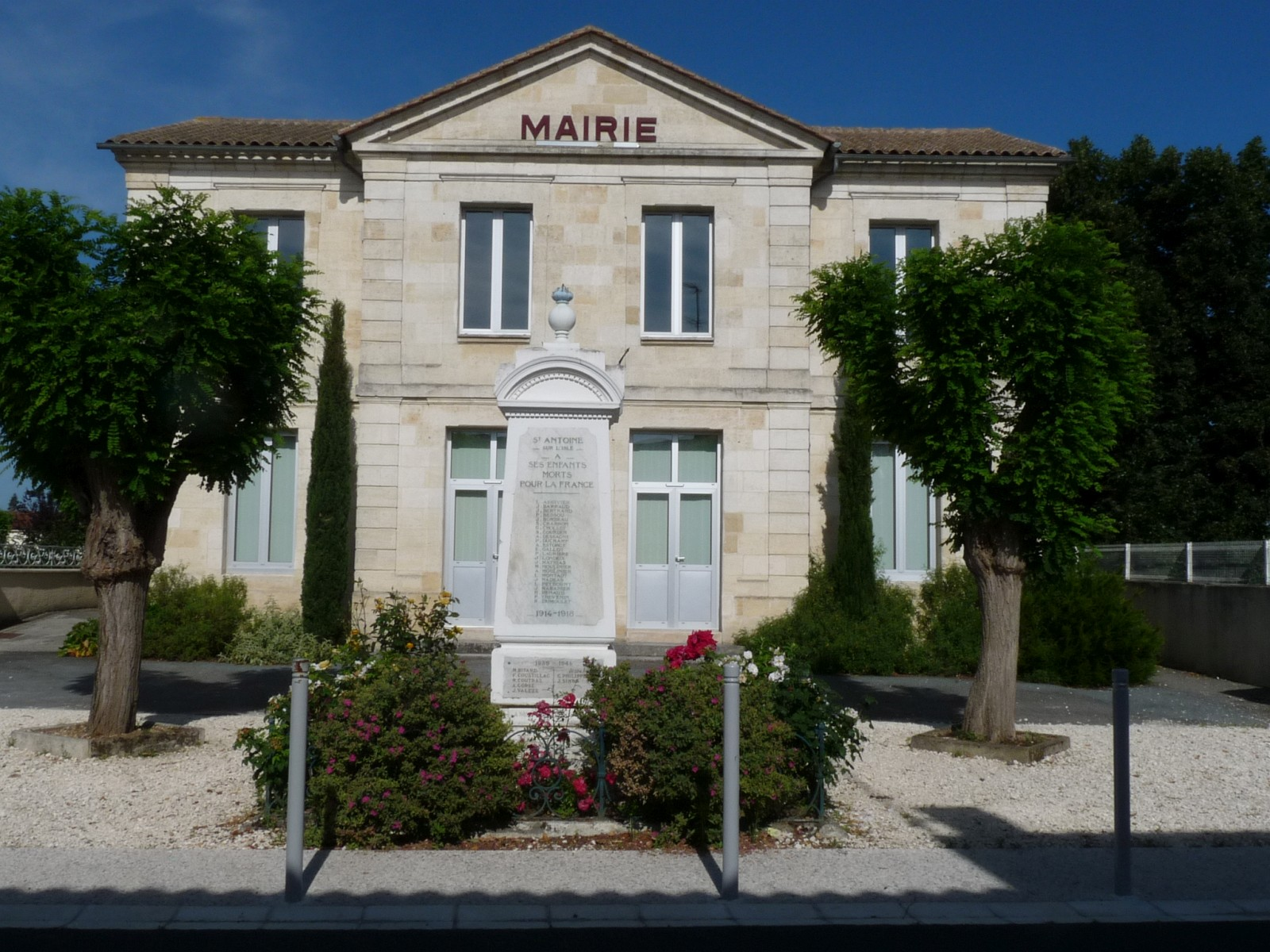
- The town hall in Saint-Antoine-sur-l'Isle
- Location of Saint-Antoine-sur-l'Isle
- Location within France Location within Nouvelle-Aquitaine
- Coordinates: 45°01′40″N 0°02′20″E
- Country: France
- Region: Nouvelle-Aquitaine
- Department: Gironde
- Arrondissement: Libourne
- Canton: Le Nord-Libournais
- Intercommunality: CA Libournais

Government
  - Mayor (2020–2026): Pâquerette Peyridieux
- Area^{1}: 10.4 km^{2} (4.0 sq mi)
- Elevation: 31 m (102 ft)
- Highest elevation: 113 m (371 ft)
- Lowest elevation: 15 m (49 ft)
- Population (2023): 579
  - Density: 55.7/km^{2} (144/sq mi)
- Time zone: UTC+01:00 (CET)
  - Summer (DST): UTC+02:00 (CEST)
- INSEE/Postal code: 33373 /33660
- ^{1} French Land Register data, which excludes lakes, ponds, glaciers > 1 km^{2} (0.386 sq mi or 247 acres) and river estuaries.

Saint-Antoine-sur-l'Isle (French pronunciation: [sɛ̃.t‿ɑ̃twan syʁ lil], literally Saint-Antoine on the Isle; Occitan: Sent Antòni d'Eila) is a commune in the Gironde department in Nouvelle-Aquitaine in southwestern France.

== Population ==
Historical population
| Year | Pop. | ±% p.a. |
|---|---|---|
| 1968 | 437 | — |
| 1975 | 405 | −1.08% |
| 1982 | 387 | −0.65% |
| 1990 | 396 | +0.29% |
| 1999 | 435 | +1.05% |
| 2007 | 534 | +2.60% |
| 2012 | 561 | +0.99% |
| 2017 | 585 | +0.84% |
| 2023 | 579 | −0.17% |
Source: INSEE

== See also ==
- Communes of the Gironde department
