= Gours, Gironde =

Gours
- Commune
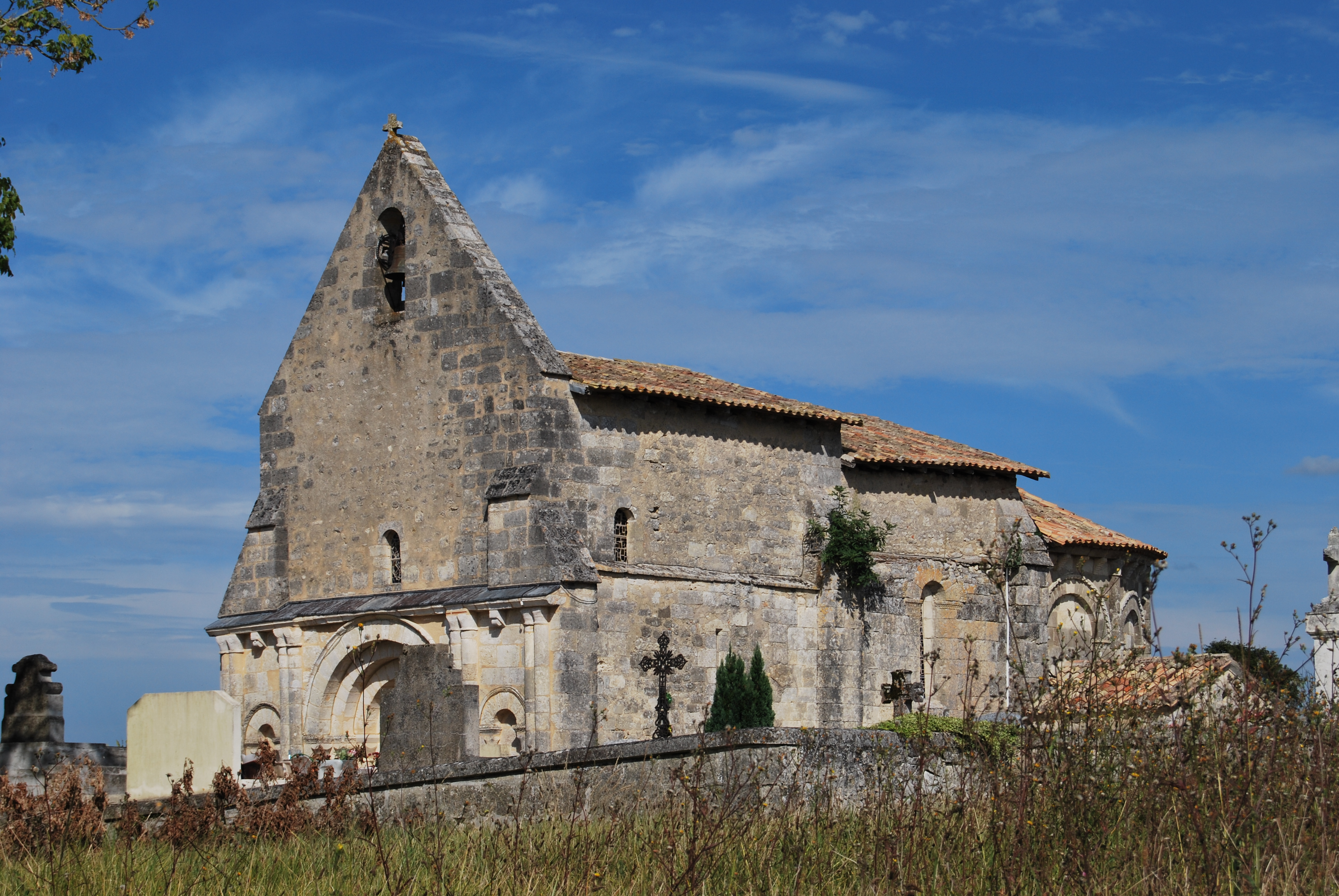
- The church in Gours
- Location of Gours
- Location within France Location within Nouvelle-Aquitaine
- Coordinates: 44°59′40″N 0°01′24″E
- Country: France
- Region: Nouvelle-Aquitaine
- Department: Gironde
- Arrondissement: Libourne
- Canton: Le Nord-Libournais
- Intercommunality: CA Libournais

Government
  - Mayor (2020–2026): Alain Paigne
- Area^{1}: 7.89 km^{2} (3.05 sq mi)
- Elevation: 23 m (75 ft)
- Highest elevation: 82 m (269 ft)
- Lowest elevation: 17 m (56 ft)
- Population (2023): 526
  - Density: 66.7/km^{2} (173/sq mi)
- Time zone: UTC+01:00 (CET)
  - Summer (DST): UTC+02:00 (CEST)
- INSEE/Postal code: 33191 /33660
- ^{1} French Land Register data, which excludes lakes, ponds, glaciers > 1 km^{2} (0.386 sq mi or 247 acres) and river estuaries.

Gours is a commune in the Gironde department in southwestern France.

== Population ==
Historical population
Year	Pop.	±% p.a.
1968	322	—
1975	317	−0.22%
1982	335	+0.79%
1990	367	+1.15%
1999	373	+0.18%
2007	403	+0.97%
2012	463	+2.81%
2017	571	+4.28%
2023	526	−1.36%
Source: INSEE

== See also ==
- Communes of the Gironde department
