= Francs, Gironde =

Francs
- Commune
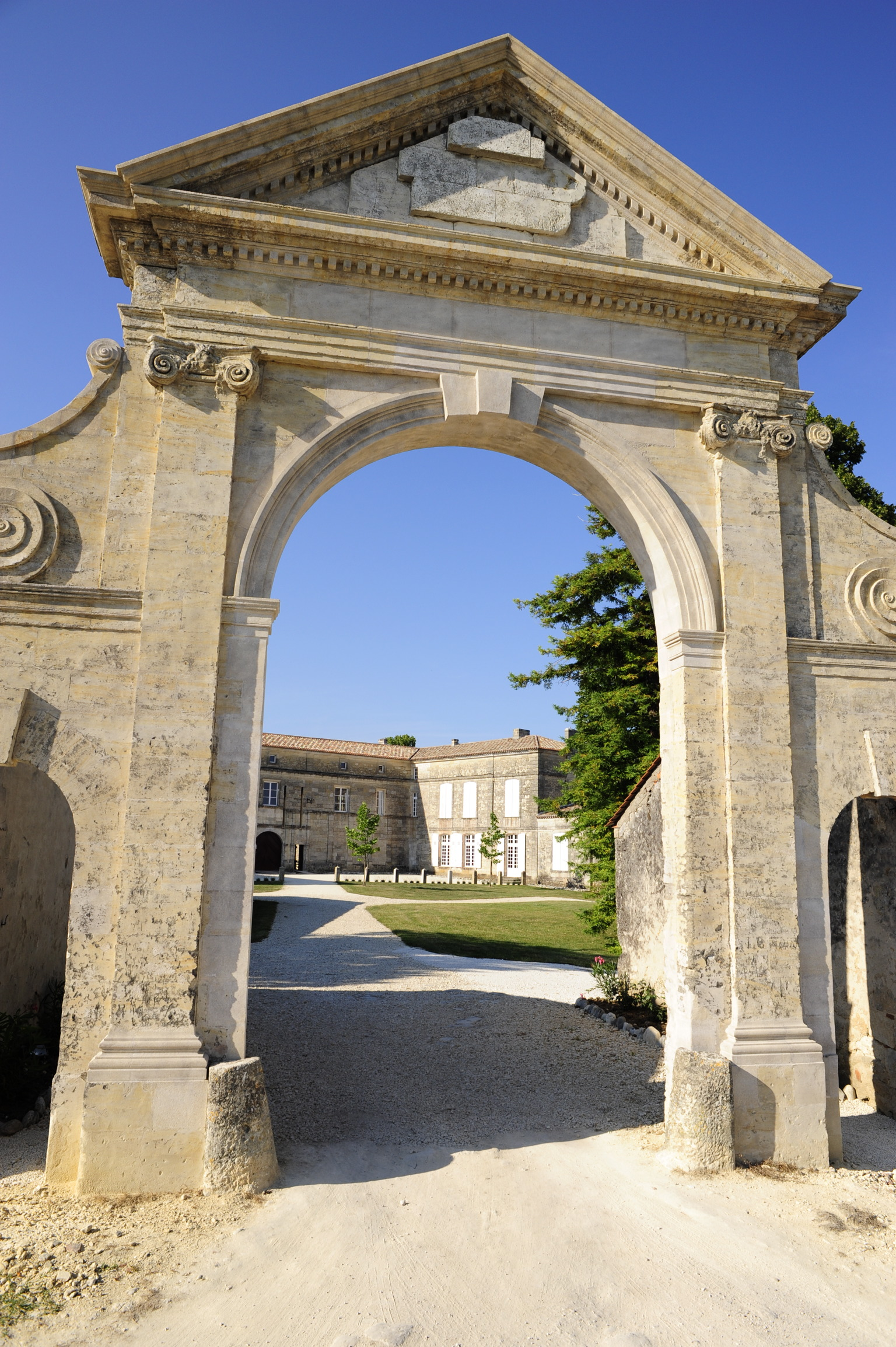
- Gate of the chateau

- Coat of arms
- Location of Francs
- Location within France Location within Nouvelle-Aquitaine
- Coordinates: 44°56′47″N 0°00′18″W
- Country: France
- Region: Nouvelle-Aquitaine
- Department: Gironde
- Arrondissement: Libourne
- Canton: Le Nord-Libournais

Government
  - Mayor (2020–2026): Florence Gissout
- Area^{1}: 6.59 km^{2} (2.54 sq mi)
- Elevation: 98 m (322 ft)
- Highest elevation: 96 m (315 ft)
- Lowest elevation: 28 m (92 ft)
- Population (2023): 176
  - Density: 26.7/km^{2} (69.2/sq mi)
- Time zone: UTC+01:00 (CET)
  - Summer (DST): UTC+02:00 (CEST)
- INSEE/Postal code: 33173 /33570
- ^{1} French Land Register data, which excludes lakes, ponds, glaciers > 1 km^{2} (0.386 sq mi or 247 acres) and river estuaries.

Francs is a commune in the Gironde department in Nouvelle-Aquitaine in southwestern France.

== Population ==
Historical population
Year	Pop.	±% p.a.
1968	215	—
1975	178	−2.66%
1982	186	+0.63%
1990	172	−0.97%
1999	178	+0.38%
2007	207	+1.90%
2012	208	+0.10%
2017	189	−1.90%
2023	176	−1.18%
Source: INSEE

== See also ==
- Communes of the Gironde department
