= Saint-Martin-du-Bois, Gironde =

Saint-Martin-du-Bois
- Commune
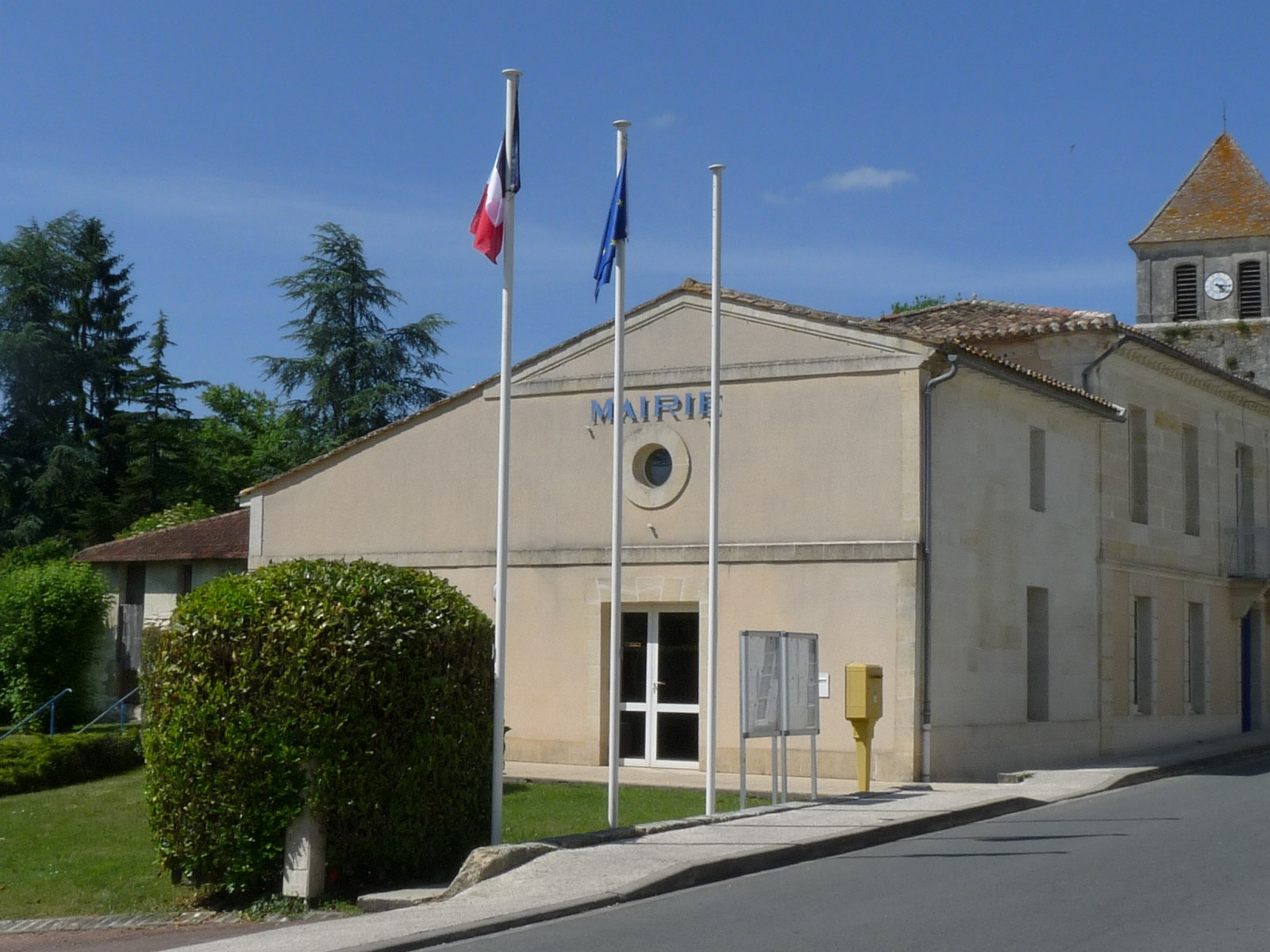
- The town hall in Saint-Martin-du-Bois
- Location of Saint-Martin-du-Bois
- Location within France Location within Nouvelle-Aquitaine
- Coordinates: 45°01′35″N 0°15′57″W
- Country: France
- Region: Nouvelle-Aquitaine
- Department: Gironde
- Arrondissement: Libourne
- Canton: Le Nord-Libournais
- Intercommunality: CA Libournais

Government
  - Mayor (2020–2026): Jean-Philippe Vironneau
- Area^{1}: 9.8 km^{2} (3.8 sq mi)
- Elevation: 40 m (130 ft)
- Highest elevation: 81 m (266 ft)
- Lowest elevation: 5 m (16 ft)
- Population (2023): 845
  - Density: 86/km^{2} (220/sq mi)
- Time zone: UTC+01:00 (CET)
  - Summer (DST): UTC+02:00 (CEST)
- INSEE/Postal code: 33445 /33910
- ^{1} French Land Register data, which excludes lakes, ponds, glaciers > 1 km^{2} (0.386 sq mi or 247 acres) and river estuaries.

Saint-Martin-du-Bois (French pronunciation: [sɛ̃ maʁtɛ̃ dy bwa]; Occitan: Sant Martin del Fusta) is a commune in the Gironde department in Nouvelle-Aquitaine in southwestern France.

== Population ==
Historical population
Year	Pop.	±% p.a.
1968	403	—
1975	384	−0.69%
1982	441	+2.00%
1990	529	+2.30%
1999	590	+1.22%
2007	790	+3.72%
2012	830	+0.99%
2017	862	+0.76%
2023	845	−0.33%
Source: INSEE

== See also ==
- Communes of the Gironde department
