= Camps-sur-l'Isle =

- Commune
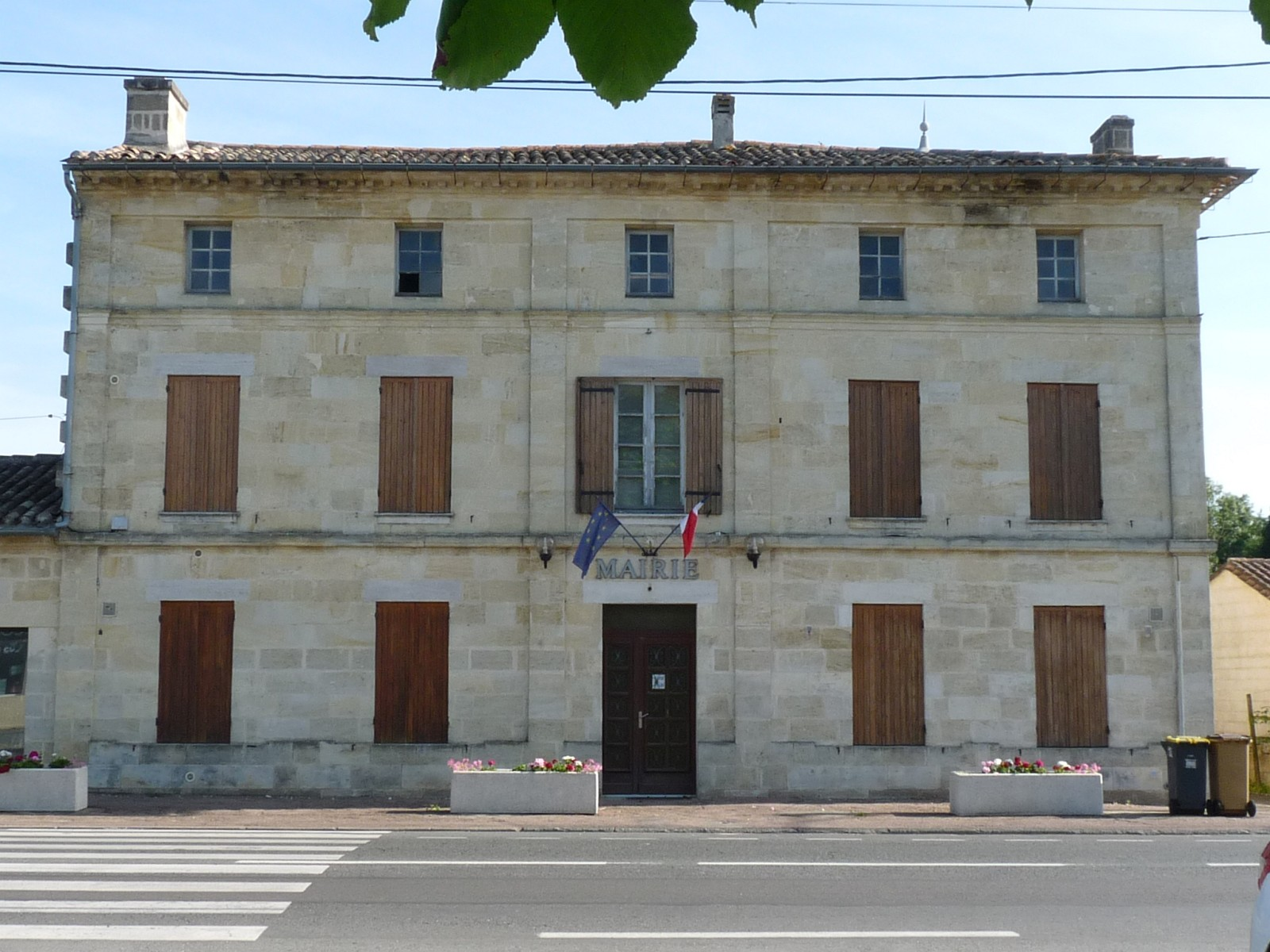
- The town hall in Camps-sur-l'Isle
- Location of Camps-sur-l'Isle
- Location within France Location within Nouvelle-Aquitaine
- Coordinates: 45°00′58″N 0°01′50″W
- Country: France
- Region: Nouvelle-Aquitaine
- Department: Gironde
- Arrondissement: Libourne
- Canton: Le Nord-Libournais
- Intercommunality: CA Libournais

Government
  - Mayor (2020–2026): David Resendé
- Area^{1}: 3.02 km^{2} (1.17 sq mi)
- Elevation: 19 m (62 ft)
- Highest elevation: 24 m (79 ft)
- Lowest elevation: 11 m (36 ft)
- Population (2023): 621
  - Density: 206/km^{2} (533/sq mi)
- Time zone: UTC+01:00 (CET)
  - Summer (DST): UTC+02:00 (CEST)
- INSEE/Postal code: 33088 /33660
- ^{1} French Land Register data, which excludes lakes, ponds, glaciers > 1 km^{2} (0.386 sq mi or 247 acres) and river estuaries.

Camps-sur-l'Isle (French pronunciation: [kɑ̃ syʁ lil], literally field on the Isle; Occitan: Camp sus l'Eila) is a commune in the Gironde department in Nouvelle-Aquitaine in southwestern France.

== Population ==
Historical population
Year	Pop.	±% p.a.
1968	356	—
1975	376	+0.78%
1982	377	+0.04%
1990	379	+0.07%
1999	388	+0.26%
2007	460	+2.15%
2012	566	+4.23%
2017	603	+1.27%
2023	621	+0.49%
Source: INSEE

== See also ==
- Communes of the Gironde department
