= Saint-Cibard =

- Commune
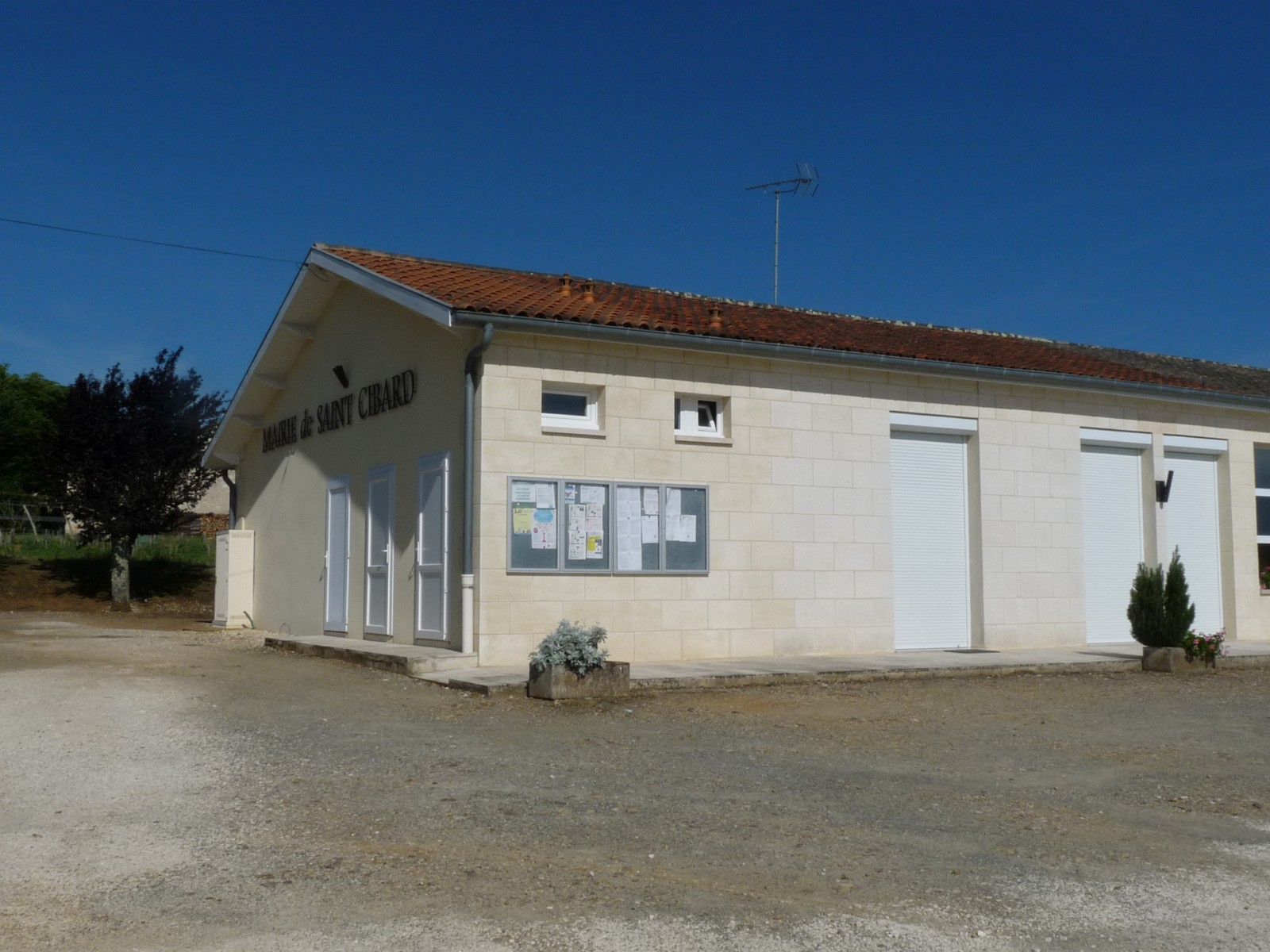
- The town hall in Saint-Cibard
- Location of Saint-Cibard
- Location within France Location within Nouvelle-Aquitaine
- Coordinates: 44°56′12″N 0°01′15″W
- Country: France
- Region: Nouvelle-Aquitaine
- Department: Gironde
- Arrondissement: Libourne
- Canton: Le Nord-Libournais

Government
  - Mayor (2020–2026): Pascal Amoreau
- Area^{1}: 3.54 km^{2} (1.37 sq mi)
- Elevation: 106 m (348 ft)
- Highest elevation: 108 m (354 ft)
- Lowest elevation: 38 m (125 ft)
- Population (2023): 188
  - Density: 53.1/km^{2} (138/sq mi)
- Time zone: UTC+01:00 (CET)
  - Summer (DST): UTC+02:00 (CEST)
- INSEE/Postal code: 33386 /33570
- ^{1} French Land Register data, which excludes lakes, ponds, glaciers > 1 km^{2} (0.386 sq mi or 247 acres) and river estuaries.

Saint-Cibard (French pronunciation: [sɛ̃ sibaʁ]; Occitan: Sench Ibarç) is a commune in the Gironde department in Nouvelle-Aquitaine in southwestern France.

== Population ==
Historical population
Year	Pop.	±% p.a.
1968	207	—
1975	191	−1.14%
1982	190	−0.07%
1990	201	+0.71%
1999	192	−0.51%
2007	197	+0.32%
2012	209	+1.19%
2017	183	−2.62%
2023	188	+0.45%
Source: INSEE

== See also ==
- Communes of the Gironde department
