= Saint-Ciers-d'Abzac =

Saint-Ciers-d’Abzac
- Commune
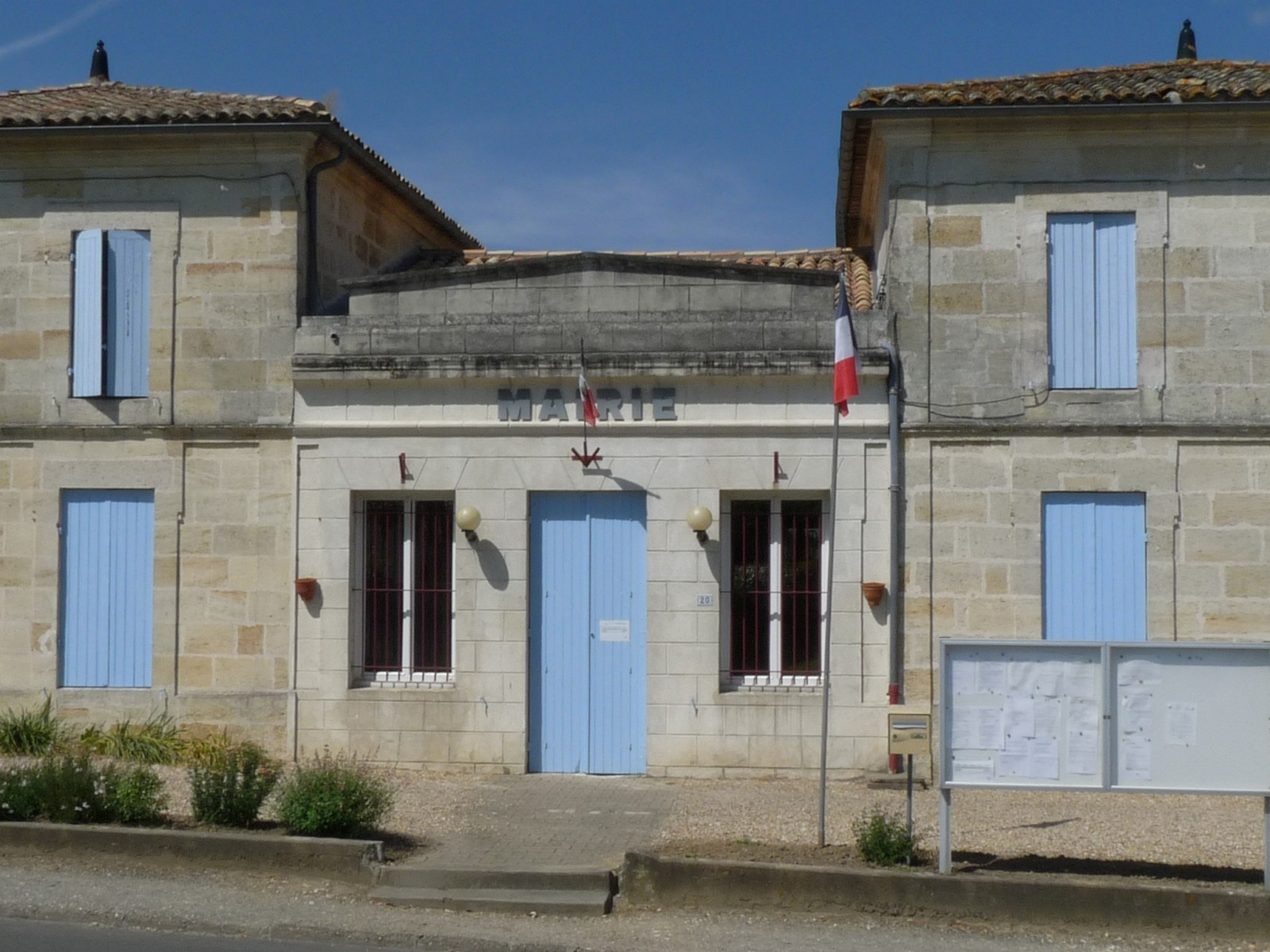
- The town hall in Saint-Ciers-d'Abzac
- Location of Saint-Ciers-d’Abzac
- Location within France Location within Nouvelle-Aquitaine
- Coordinates: 45°01′55″N 0°16′33″W
- Country: France
- Region: Nouvelle-Aquitaine
- Department: Gironde
- Arrondissement: Libourne
- Canton: Le Nord-Libournais
- Intercommunality: CA Libournais

Government
  - Mayor (2020–2026): Lionel Gachard
- Area^{1}: 11.71 km^{2} (4.52 sq mi)
- Elevation: 50 m (160 ft)
- Highest elevation: 67 m (220 ft)
- Lowest elevation: 6 m (20 ft)
- Population (2023): 1,614
  - Density: 137.8/km^{2} (357.0/sq mi)
- Time zone: UTC+01:00 (CET)
  - Summer (DST): UTC+02:00 (CEST)
- INSEE/Postal code: 33387 /33910
- ^{1} French Land Register data, which excludes lakes, ponds, glaciers > 1 km^{2} (0.386 sq mi or 247 acres) and river estuaries.

Saint-Ciers-d'Abzac (French pronunciation: [sɛ̃ sje dabzak]) is a commune in the Gironde department in Nouvelle-Aquitaine in southwestern France.

== Population ==
Historical population
Year	Pop.	±% p.a.
1968	423	—
1975	452	+0.95%
1982	603	+4.20%
1990	946	+5.79%
1999	1,071	+1.39%
2007	1,222	+1.66%
2012	1,370	+2.31%
2017	1,446	+1.09%
2023	1,614	+1.85%
Source: INSEE

== Twin town ==
- Seròs, Spain, since 1993.

== See also ==
- Communes of the Gironde department
