= Lagorce, Gironde =

Lagorce
- Commune
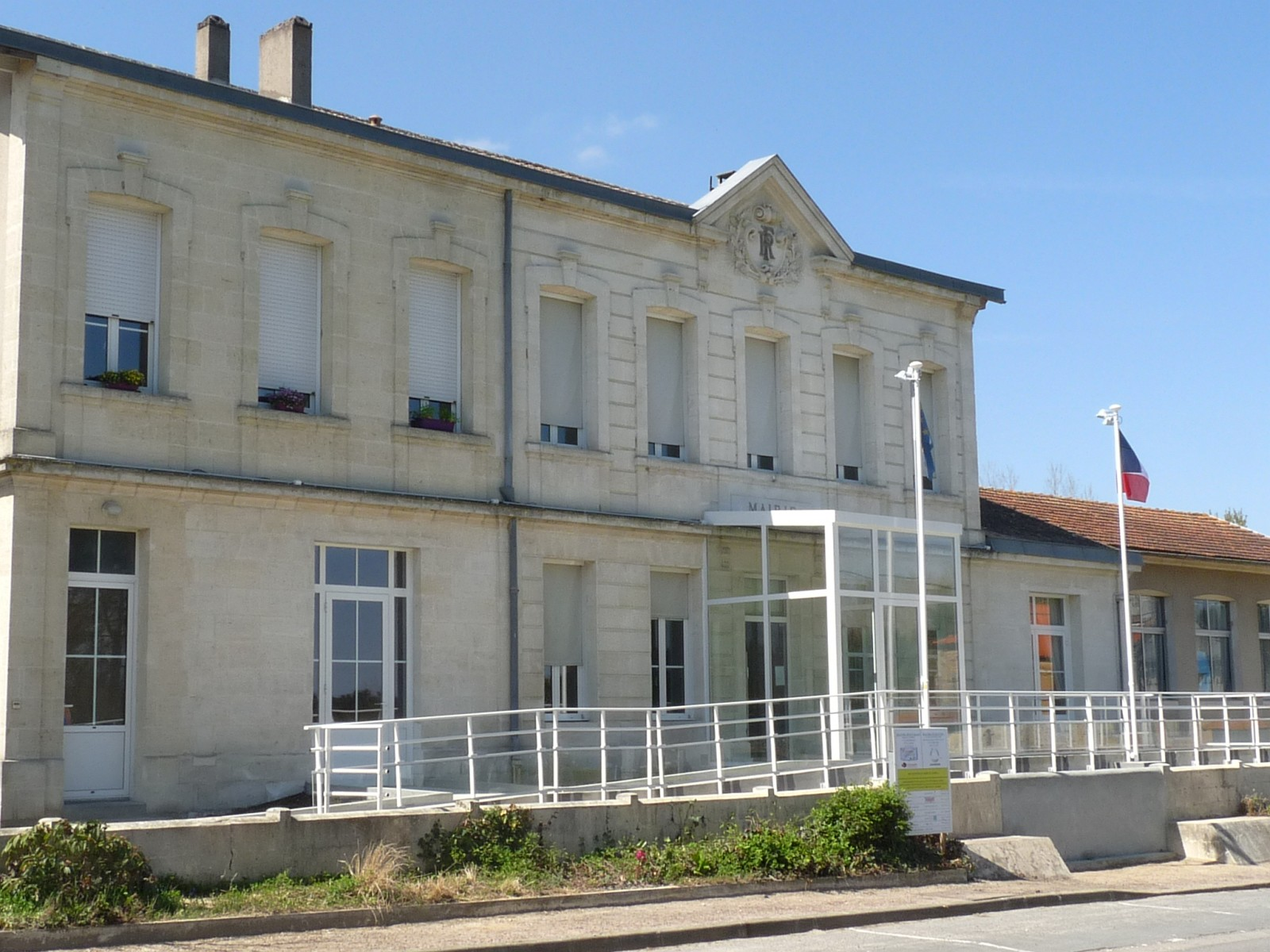
- The town hall in Lagorce
- Location of Lagorce
- Location within France Location within Nouvelle-Aquitaine
- Coordinates: 45°05′07″N 0°09′47″W
- Country: France
- Region: Nouvelle-Aquitaine
- Department: Gironde
- Arrondissement: Libourne
- Canton: Le Nord-Libournais
- Intercommunality: CA Libournais

Government
  - Mayor (2020–2026): Bruno Lavidalie
- Area^{1}: 28.47 km^{2} (10.99 sq mi)
- Elevation: 78 m (256 ft)
- Highest elevation: 91 m (299 ft)
- Lowest elevation: 5 m (16 ft)
- Population (2023): 1,575
  - Density: 55.32/km^{2} (143.3/sq mi)
- Time zone: UTC+01:00 (CET)
  - Summer (DST): UTC+02:00 (CEST)
- INSEE/Postal code: 33218 /33230
- ^{1} French Land Register data, which excludes lakes, ponds, glaciers > 1 km^{2} (0.386 sq mi or 247 acres) and river estuaries.

Lagorce (French pronunciation: [laɡɔʁs]; Occitan: La Gòrça) is a commune in the Gironde department in Nouvelle-Aquitaine in southwestern France.

== Population ==
Historical population
Year	Pop.	±% p.a.
1968	905	—
1975	892	−0.21%
1982	1,046	+2.30%
1990	1,238	+2.13%
1999	1,294	+0.49%
2007	1,587	+2.58%
2012	1,675	+1.09%
2017	1,667	−0.10%
2023	1,575	−0.94%
Source: INSEE

== See also ==
- Communes of the Gironde department
