= Communauté d'agglomération du Libournais =

Libournais
- Communauté d'agglomération
- Interactive map of Libournais
- Coordinates: 44°58′N 00°12′W
- Country: France
- Region: Nouvelle-Aquitaine
- Department: Gironde
- No. of communes: {{{nbcomm}}}
- Established: 2017
- Area: 568.8 km^{2} (219.6 sq mi)
- Population (2019): 91,475
  - Density: 160.8/km^{2} (416.5/sq mi)
- Website: www.lacali.fr

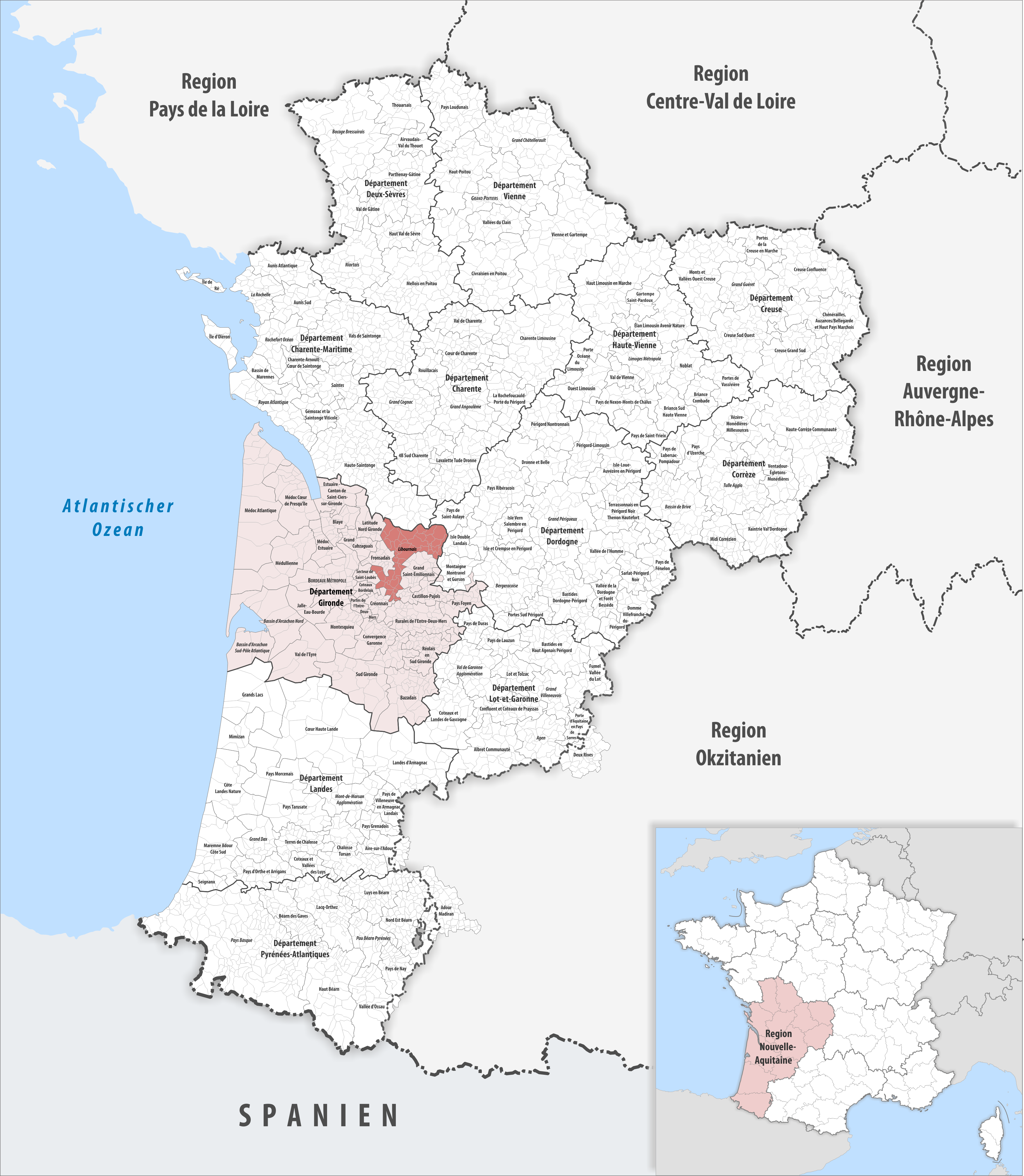
Location of the Libournais Community of Municipalities

Communauté d'agglomération du Libournais is the communauté d'agglomération, an intercommunal structure, centred on the town of Libourne. It is located in the Gironde department, in the Nouvelle-Aquitaine region, southwestern France. Created in 2017, its seat is in Libourne. Its area is 568.8 km^{2}. Its population was 91,475 in 2019, of which 24,257 in Libourne proper.

== Composition ==
The communauté d'agglomération consists of the following 45 communes:

1. Abzac
2. Arveyres
3. Bayas
4. Les Billaux
5. Bonzac
6. Cadarsac
7. Camps-sur-l'Isle
8. Chamadelle
9. Coutras
10. Daignac
11. Dardenac
12. Les Églisottes-et-Chalaures
13. Espiet
14. Le Fieu
15. Génissac
16. Gours
17. Guîtres
18. Izon
19. Lagorce
20. Lalande-de-Pomerol
21. Lapouyade
22. Libourne
23. Maransin
24. Moulon
25. Nérigean
26. Les Peintures
27. Pomerol
28. Porchères
29. Puynormand
30. Sablons
31. Saint-Antoine-sur-l'Isle
32. Saint-Christophe-de-Double
33. Saint-Ciers-d'Abzac
34. Saint-Denis-de-Pile
35. Saint-Germain-du-Puch
36. Saint-Martin-de-Laye
37. Saint-Martin-du-Bois
38. Saint-Médard-de-Guizières
39. Saint-Quentin-de-Baron
40. Saint-Sauveur-de-Puynormand
41. Saint-Seurin-sur-l'Isle
42. Savignac-de-l'Isle
43. Tizac-de-Curton
44. Tizac-de-Lapouyade
45. Vayres
