= Bayas =

- Commune
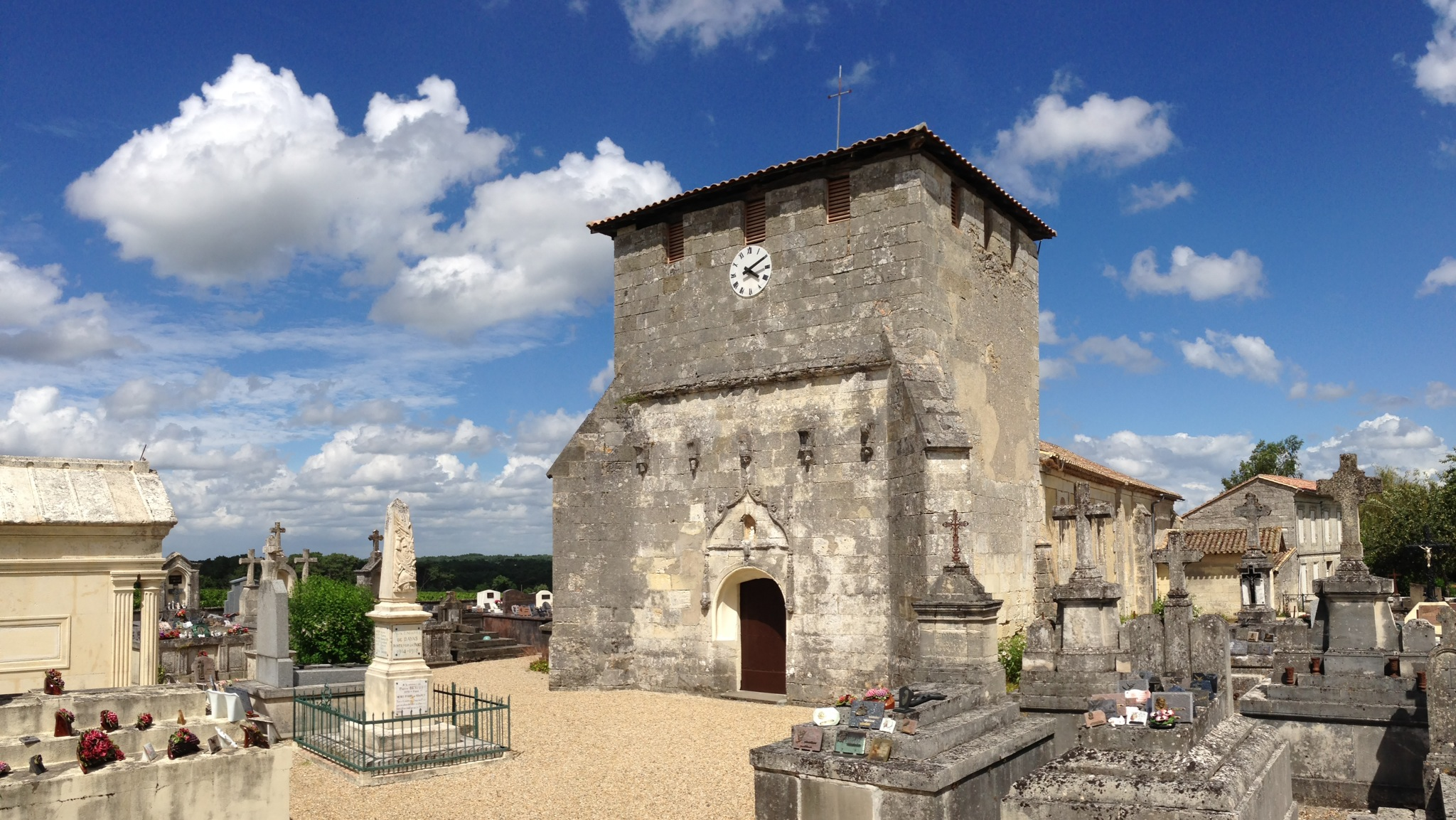
- The church in Bayas
- Location of Bayas
- Location within France Location within Nouvelle-Aquitaine
- Coordinates: 45°03′42″N 0°12′20″W
- Country: France
- Region: Nouvelle-Aquitaine
- Department: Gironde
- Arrondissement: Libourne
- Canton: Le Nord-Libournais
- Intercommunality: CA Libournais

Government
  - Mayor (2020–2026): Fabienne Krier
- Area^{1}: 10.82 km^{2} (4.18 sq mi)
- Elevation: 82 m (269 ft)
- Highest elevation: 81 m (266 ft)
- Lowest elevation: 8 m (26 ft)
- Population (2023): 453
  - Density: 41.9/km^{2} (108/sq mi)
- Time zone: UTC+01:00 (CET)
  - Summer (DST): UTC+02:00 (CEST)
- INSEE/Postal code: 33034 /33230
- ^{1} French Land Register data, which excludes lakes, ponds, glaciers > 1 km^{2} (0.386 sq mi or 247 acres) and river estuaries.

Bayas (French pronunciation: [baˈjas]) is a commune in the Gironde department in southwestern France.

== Population ==
Historical population
Year	Pop.	±% p.a.
1968	351	—
1975	318	−1.40%
1982	359	+1.75%
1990	447	+2.78%
1999	420	−0.69%
2007	452	+0.92%
2012	438	−0.63%
2017	456	+0.81%
2023	453	−0.11%
Source: INSEE

== See also ==
- Communes of the Gironde department
