= Maransin, Gironde =

Maransin
- Commune
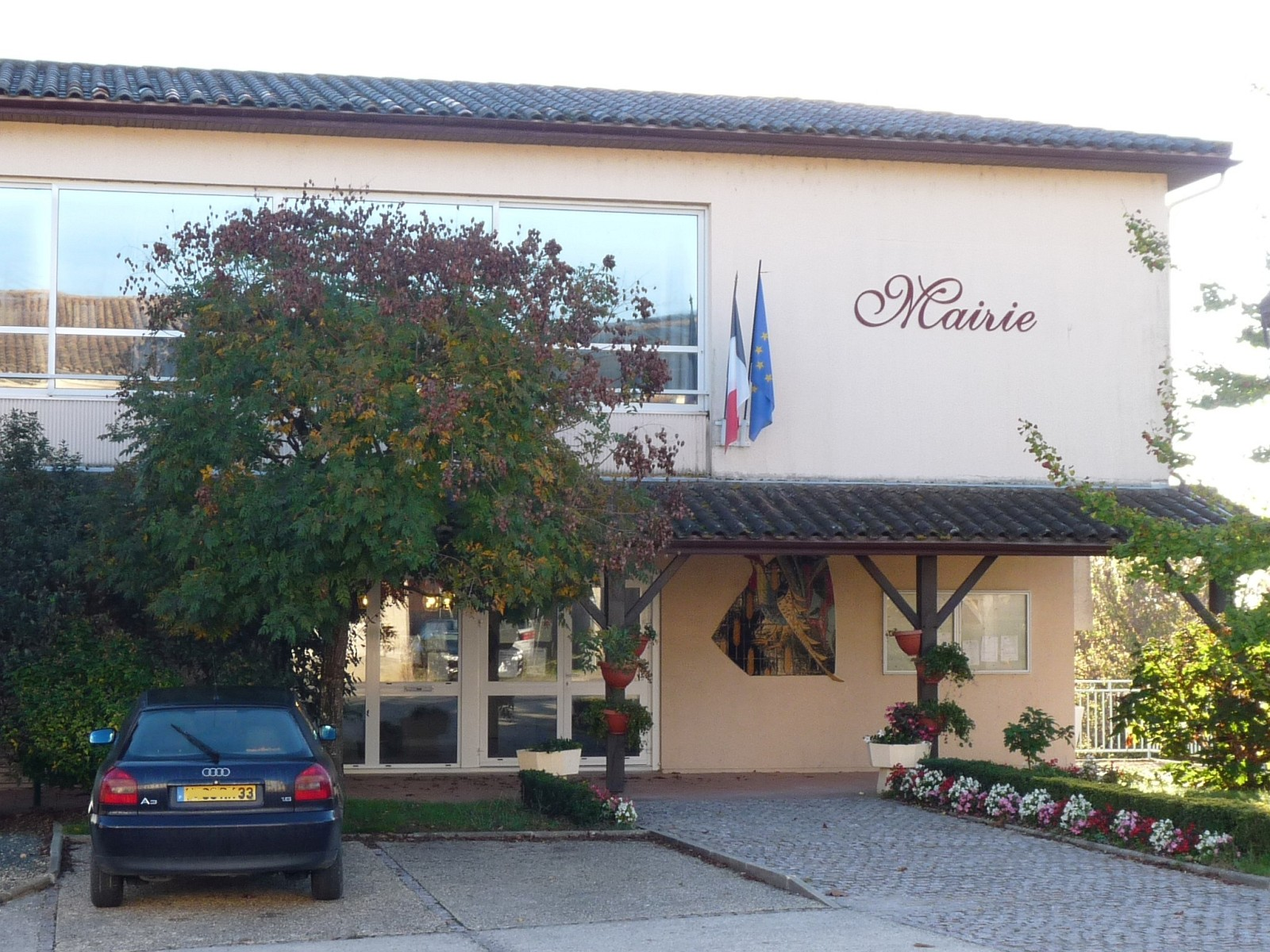
- The town hall in Maransin

- Coat of arms
- Location of Maransin
- Location within France Location within Nouvelle-Aquitaine
- Coordinates: 45°04′20″N 0°16′01″W
- Country: France
- Region: Nouvelle-Aquitaine
- Department: Gironde
- Arrondissement: Libourne
- Canton: Le Nord-Libournais
- Intercommunality: CA Libournais

Government
  - Mayor (2020–2026): Bernard Bacci
- Area^{1}: 29.94 km^{2} (11.56 sq mi)
- Elevation: 52 m (171 ft)
- Highest elevation: 101 m (331 ft)
- Lowest elevation: 18 m (59 ft)
- Population (2023): 1,063
  - Density: 35.50/km^{2} (91.96/sq mi)
- Time zone: UTC+01:00 (CET)
  - Summer (DST): UTC+02:00 (CEST)
- INSEE/Postal code: 33264 /33230
- ^{1} French Land Register data, which excludes lakes, ponds, glaciers > 1 km^{2} (0.386 sq mi or 247 acres) and river estuaries.

Maransin (French pronunciation: [maʁɑ̃sɛ̃]) is a commune in the Gironde department in Nouvelle-Aquitaine in southwestern France.

== Population ==
Historical population
Year	Pop.	±% p.a.
1968	748	—
1975	670	−1.56%
1982	753	+1.68%
1990	818	+1.04%
1999	869	+0.67%
2007	1,050	+2.39%
2012	1,035	−0.29%
2017	1,016	−0.37%
2023	1,063	+0.76%
Source: INSEE

== See also ==
- Communes of the Gironde department
