= Les Églisottes-et-Chalaures =

- Commune
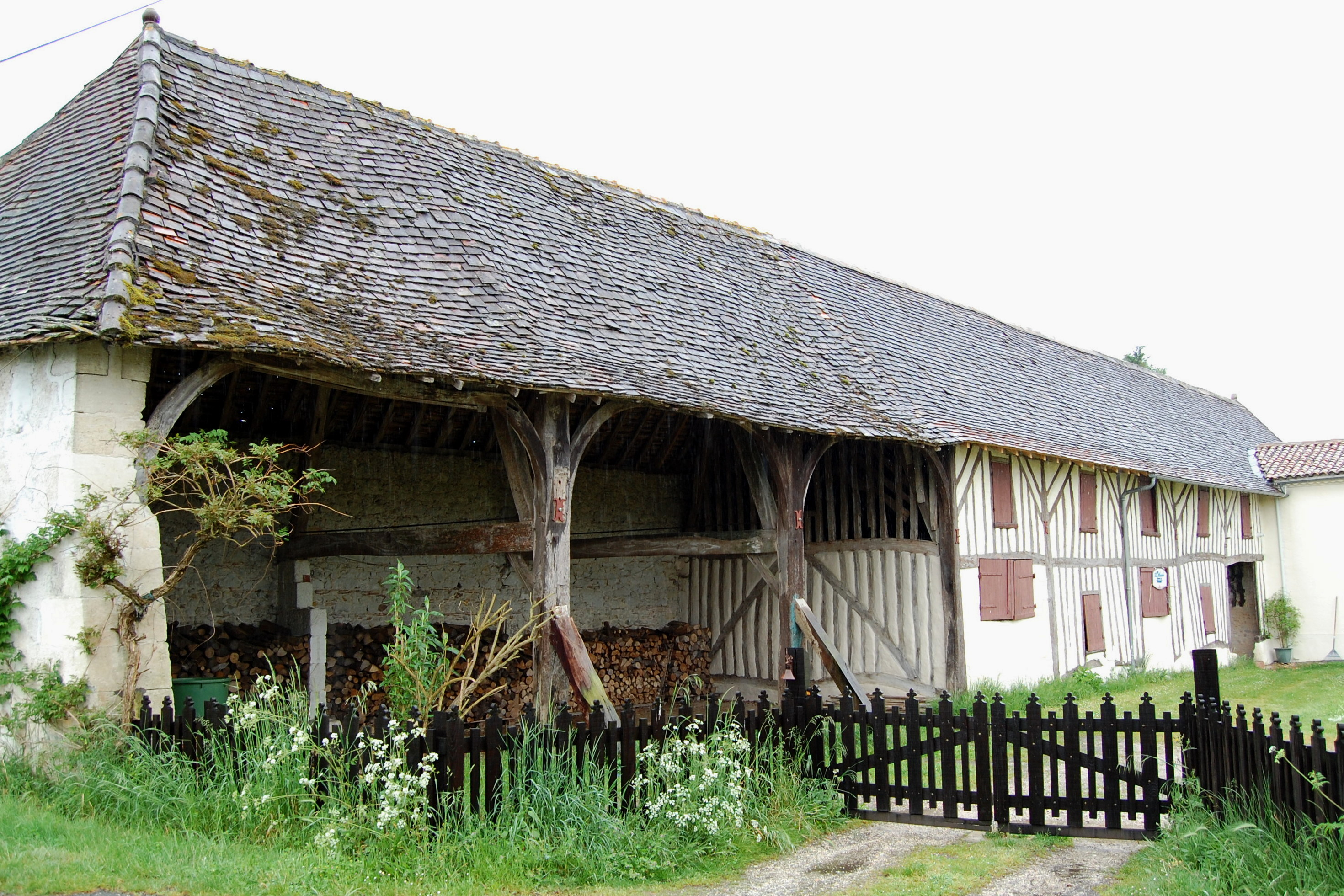
- Open-beam house with dovecote
- Location of Les Églisottes-et-Chalaures
- Location within France Location within Nouvelle-Aquitaine
- Coordinates: 45°06′02″N 0°02′11″W
- Country: France
- Region: Nouvelle-Aquitaine
- Department: Gironde
- Arrondissement: Libourne
- Canton: Le Nord-Libournais
- Intercommunality: CA Libournais

Government
  - Mayor (2020–2026): Patrick Huchet
- Area^{1}: 17.16 km^{2} (6.63 sq mi)
- Elevation: 24 m (79 ft)
- Highest elevation: 103 m (338 ft)
- Lowest elevation: 10 m (33 ft)
- Population (2023): 2,205
  - Density: 128.5/km^{2} (332.8/sq mi)
- Time zone: UTC+01:00 (CET)
  - Summer (DST): UTC+02:00 (CEST)
- INSEE/Postal code: 33154 /33230
- ^{1} French Land Register data, which excludes lakes, ponds, glaciers > 1 km^{2} (0.386 sq mi or 247 acres) and river estuaries.

Les Églisottes-et-Chalaures (French pronunciation: [le.z‿eɡlizɔt e ʃalɔʁ]; Occitan: Las Gleisòtas e Chalauras) is a commune in the Gironde department in southwestern France.

== Population ==
Historical population
| Year | Pop. | ±% p.a. |
|---|---|---|
| 1968 | 1,982 | — |
| 1975 | 1,863 | −0.88% |
| 1982 | 1,791 | −0.56% |
| 1990 | 1,731 | −0.43% |
| 1999 | 1,883 | +0.94% |
| 2007 | 2,105 | +1.40% |
| 2012 | 2,193 | +0.82% |
| 2017 | 2,152 | −0.38% |
| 2023 | 2,205 | +0.41% |
Source: INSEE

== See also ==
- Communes of the Gironde department
