= Sablons, Gironde =

Sablons
- Commune
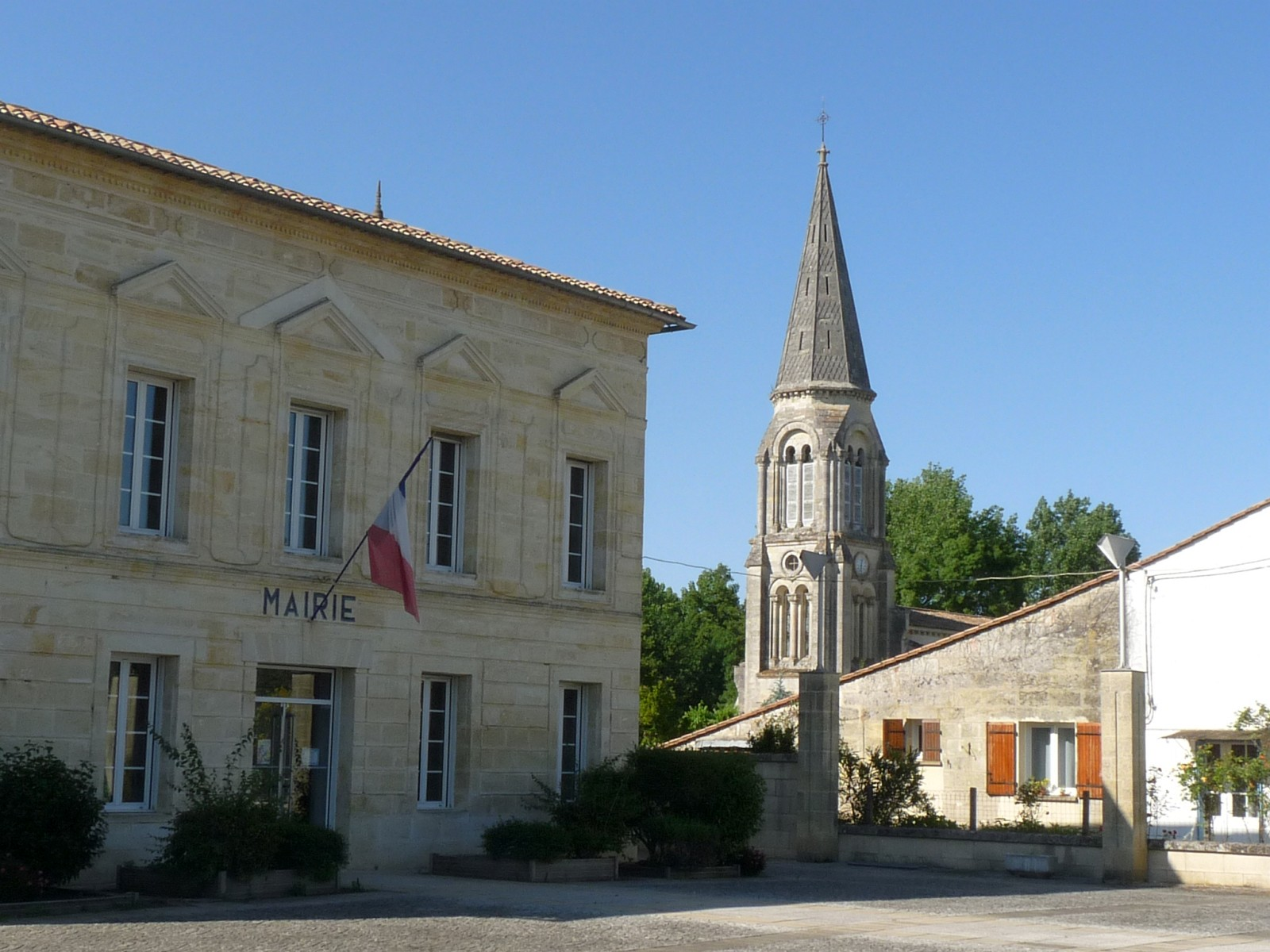
- The town hall and church in Sablons
- Location of Sablons
- Location within France Location within Nouvelle-Aquitaine
- Coordinates: 45°01′35″N 0°11′33″W
- Country: France
- Region: Nouvelle-Aquitaine
- Department: Gironde
- Arrondissement: Libourne
- Canton: Le Nord-Libournais
- Intercommunality: CA Libournais

Government
  - Mayor (2020–2026): Jean-Claude Abanades
- Area^{1}: 11.84 km^{2} (4.57 sq mi)
- Elevation: 9 m (30 ft)
- Highest elevation: 16 m (52 ft)
- Lowest elevation: 1 m (3.3 ft)
- Population (2023): 1,314
  - Density: 111.0/km^{2} (287.4/sq mi)
- Time zone: UTC+01:00 (CET)
  - Summer (DST): UTC+02:00 (CEST)
- INSEE/Postal code: 33362 /33910
- ^{1} French Land Register data, which excludes lakes, ponds, glaciers > 1 km^{2} (0.386 sq mi or 247 acres) and river estuaries.

Sablons (French pronunciation: [sablɔ̃]) is a commune in the Gironde department in Nouvelle-Aquitaine in southwestern France.

== Population ==
Historical population
Year	Pop.	±% p.a.
1968	881	—
1975	946	+1.02%
1982	1,016	+1.03%
1990	1,210	+2.21%
1999	1,182	−0.26%
2007	1,298	+1.18%
2012	1,288	−0.15%
2017	1,314	+0.40%
2023	1,314	+0.00%
Source: INSEE

== See also ==
- Communes of the Gironde department
