= Porchères =

- Commune
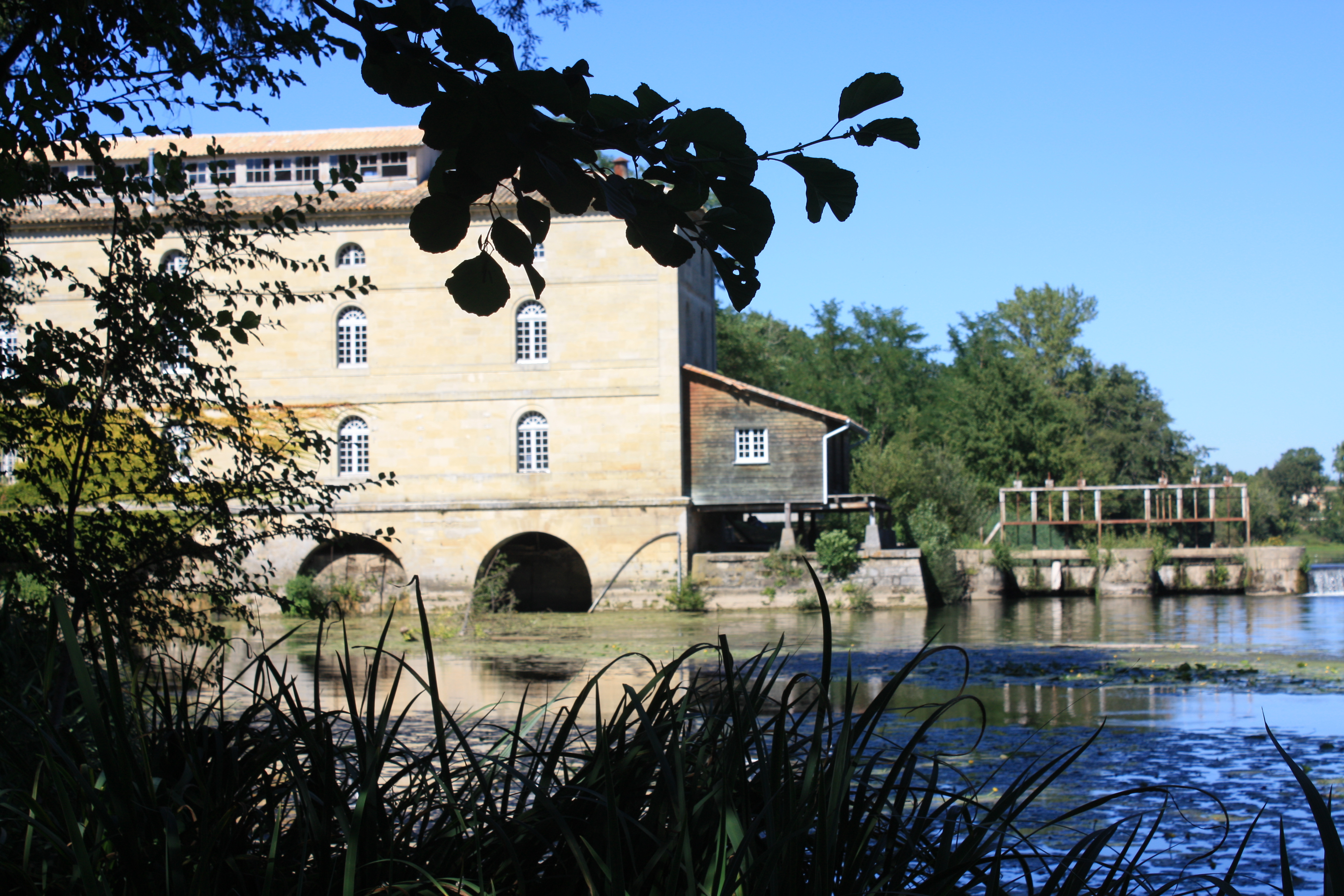
- Mill
- Location of Porchères
- Location within France Location within Nouvelle-Aquitaine
- Coordinates: 45°01′50″N 0°00′40″E
- Country: France
- Region: Nouvelle-Aquitaine
- Department: Gironde
- Arrondissement: Libourne
- Canton: Le Nord-Libournais
- Intercommunality: CA Libournais

Government
  - Mayor (2020–2026): David Redon
- Area^{1}: 13.19 km^{2} (5.09 sq mi)
- Elevation: 30 m (98 ft)
- Highest elevation: 85 m (279 ft)
- Lowest elevation: 12 m (39 ft)
- Population (2023): 887
  - Density: 67.2/km^{2} (174/sq mi)
- Time zone: UTC+01:00 (CET)
  - Summer (DST): UTC+02:00 (CEST)
- INSEE/Postal code: 33332 /33660
- ^{1} French Land Register data, which excludes lakes, ponds, glaciers > 1 km^{2} (0.386 sq mi or 247 acres) and river estuaries.

Porchères (French pronunciation: [pɔʁʃɛʁ]) is a commune in the Gironde department in Nouvelle-Aquitaine in southwestern France.

== Population ==
Historical population
Year	Pop.	±% p.a.
1968	524	—
1975	531	+0.19%
1982	541	+0.27%
1990	668	+2.67%
1999	726	+0.93%
2007	865	+2.21%
2012	909	+1.00%
2017	881	−0.62%
2023	887	+0.11%
Source: INSEE

== See also ==
- Communes of the Gironde department
