= Saint-Christophe-des-Bardes =

- Commune
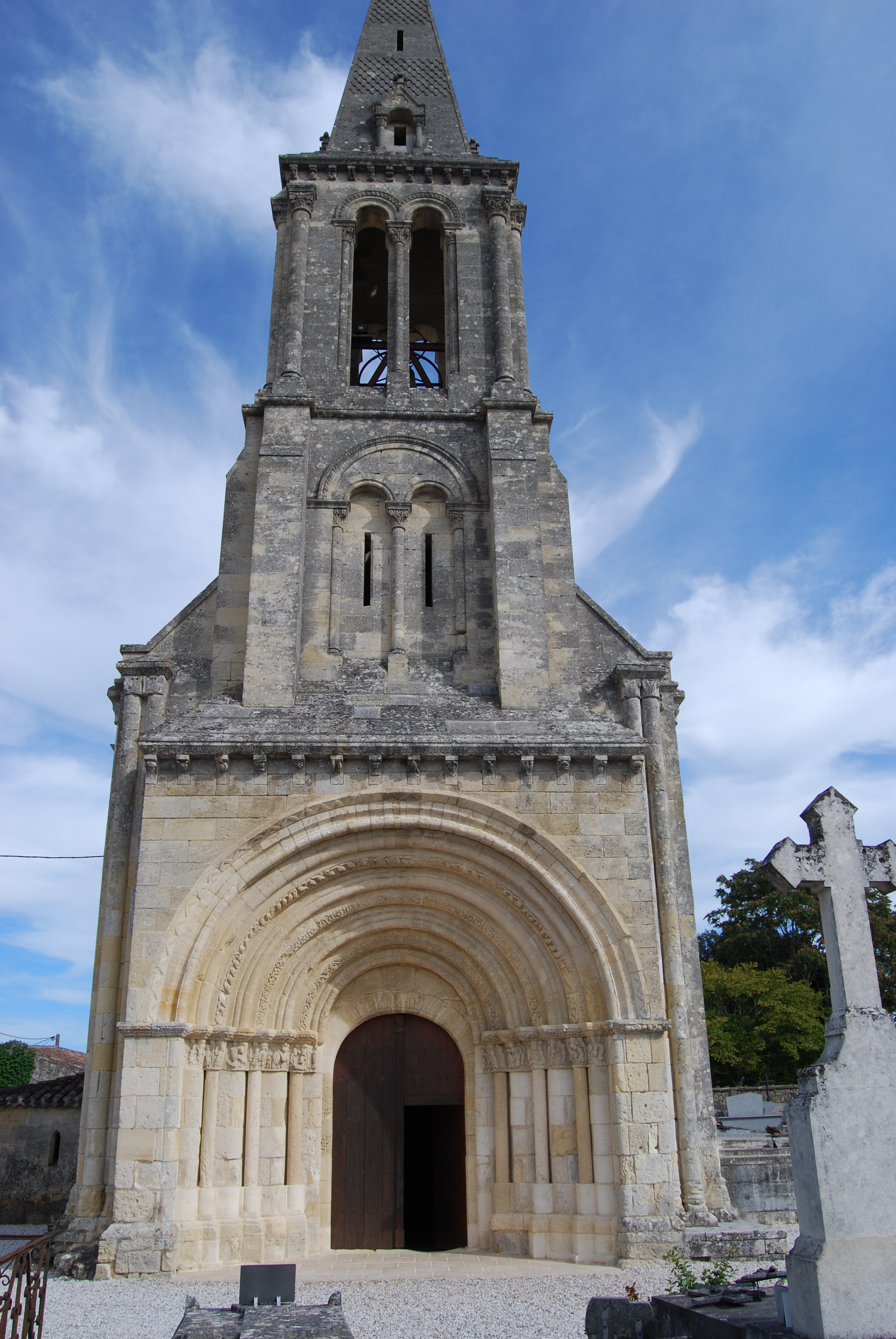
- The church in Saint-Christophe-des-Bardes

- Coat of arms
- Location of Saint-Christophe-des-Bardes
- Location within France Location within Nouvelle-Aquitaine
- Coordinates: 44°53′49″N 0°07′18″W
- Country: France
- Region: Nouvelle-Aquitaine
- Department: Gironde
- Arrondissement: Libourne
- Canton: Le Nord-Libournais

Government
  - Mayor (2020–2026): Patrick Goineau
- Area^{1}: 7.69 km^{2} (2.97 sq mi)
- Elevation: 100 m (330 ft)
- Highest elevation: 97 m (318 ft)
- Lowest elevation: 25 m (82 ft)
- Population (2023): 386
  - Density: 50.2/km^{2} (130/sq mi)
- Time zone: UTC+01:00 (CET)
  - Summer (DST): UTC+02:00 (CEST)
- INSEE/Postal code: 33384 /33330
- ^{1} French Land Register data, which excludes lakes, ponds, glaciers > 1 km^{2} (0.386 sq mi or 247 acres) and river estuaries.

Saint-Christophe-des-Bardes (French pronunciation: [sɛ̃ kʁistɔf de baʁd]; Gascon: Sent Cristòfe de Bardas) is a commune in the Gironde department in Nouvelle-Aquitaine in southwestern France.

== Population ==
Historical population
Year	Pop.	±% p.a.
1968	715	—
1975	646	−1.44%
1982	594	−1.19%
1990	547	−1.03%
1999	515	−0.67%
2007	522	+0.17%
2012	482	−1.58%
2017	442	−1.72%
2023	386	−2.23%
Source: INSEE

== See also ==
- Communes of the Gironde department
