= Coutras =

- Commune
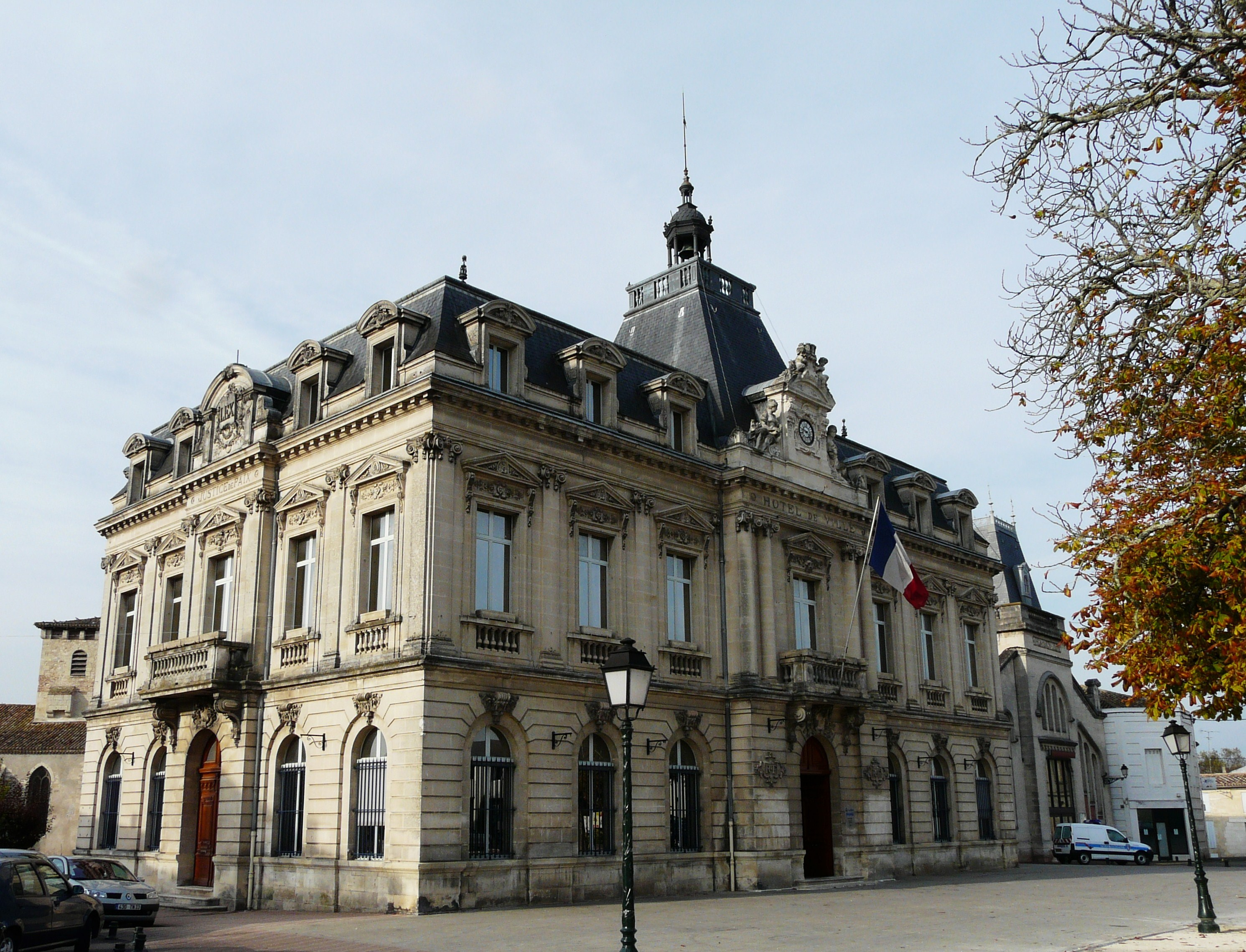
- Town hall

- Coat of arms
- Location of Coutras
- Location within France Location within Nouvelle-Aquitaine
- Coordinates: 45°02′30″N 0°07′38″W
- Country: France
- Region: Nouvelle-Aquitaine
- Department: Gironde
- Arrondissement: Libourne
- Canton: Le Nord-Libournais
- Intercommunality: CA Libournais

Government
  - Mayor (2020–2026): Jérôme Cosnard
- Area^{1}: 33.69 km^{2} (13.01 sq mi)
- Elevation: 13 m (43 ft)
- Highest elevation: 74 m (243 ft)
- Lowest elevation: 4 m (13 ft)
- Population (2023): 8,678
  - Density: 257.6/km^{2} (667.1/sq mi)
- Time zone: UTC+01:00 (CET)
  - Summer (DST): UTC+02:00 (CEST)
- INSEE/Postal code: 33138 /33230
- ^{1} French Land Register data, which excludes lakes, ponds, glaciers > 1 km^{2} (0.386 sq mi or 247 acres) and river estuaries.

Coutras (French pronunciation: [kutʁa]) is a commune in the Gironde department in Nouvelle-Aquitaine in southwestern France. Coutras station has rail connections to Bordeaux, Angoulême, Périgueux, Brive-la-Gaillarde and Limoges.

== History ==
The Battle of Coutras, one of the most important battles of the French Wars of Religion, was fought there on 20 October 1587.

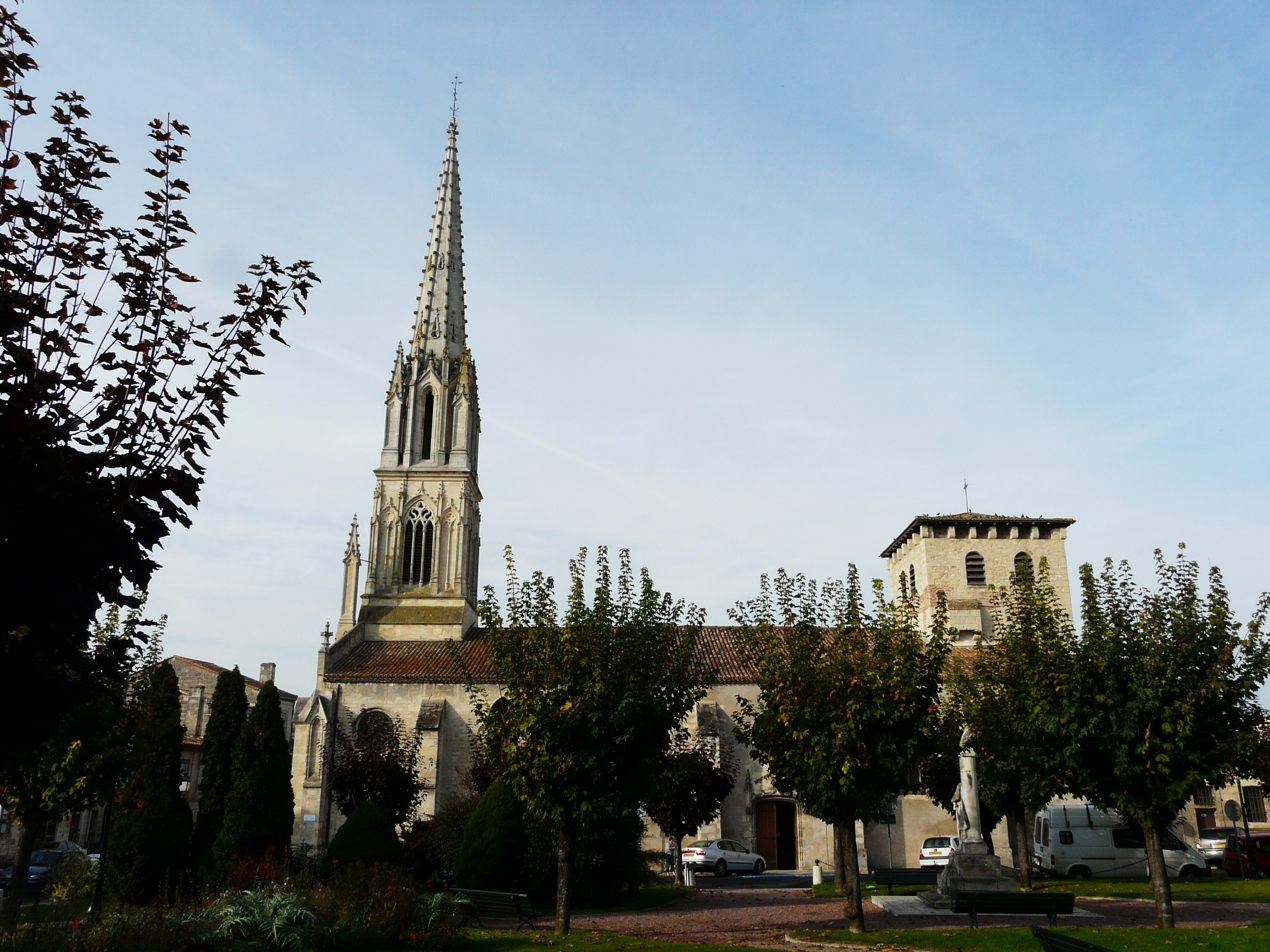
Coutras church

== Population ==
Historical population

Year	Pop.	±% p.a.
1793	3,000	—
1800	3,060	+0.28%
1806	3,050	−0.05%
1821	2,821	−0.52%
1831	3,144	+1.09%
1836	3,172	+0.18%
1841	3,302	+0.81%
1846	3,200	−0.63%
1851	3,371	+1.05%
1856	3,532	+0.94%
1861	3,883	+1.91%
1866	3,789	−0.49%
1872	3,685	−0.46%
1876	3,944	+1.71%
1881	4,008	+0.32%
1886	5,092	+4.90%
1891	4,231	−3.64%
1896	3,903	−1.60%
1901	4,062	+0.80%

Year	Pop.	±% p.a.
1906	4,406	+1.64%
1911	4,807	+1.76%
1921	4,924	+0.24%
1926	5,078	+0.62%
1931	5,211	+0.52%
1936	5,281	+0.27%
1946	5,540	+0.48%
1954	5,668	+0.29%
1962	5,948	+0.60%
1968	5,830	−0.33%
1975	6,040	+0.51%
1982	6,351	+0.72%
1990	6,689	+0.65%
1999	7,003	+0.51%
2007	7,815	+1.38%
2012	8,085	+0.68%
2017	8,606	+1.26%
2023	8,678	+0.14%

Source: EHESS and INSEE (1968-2023)

== See also ==
- Communes of the Gironde department
