= Puynormand =

- Commune
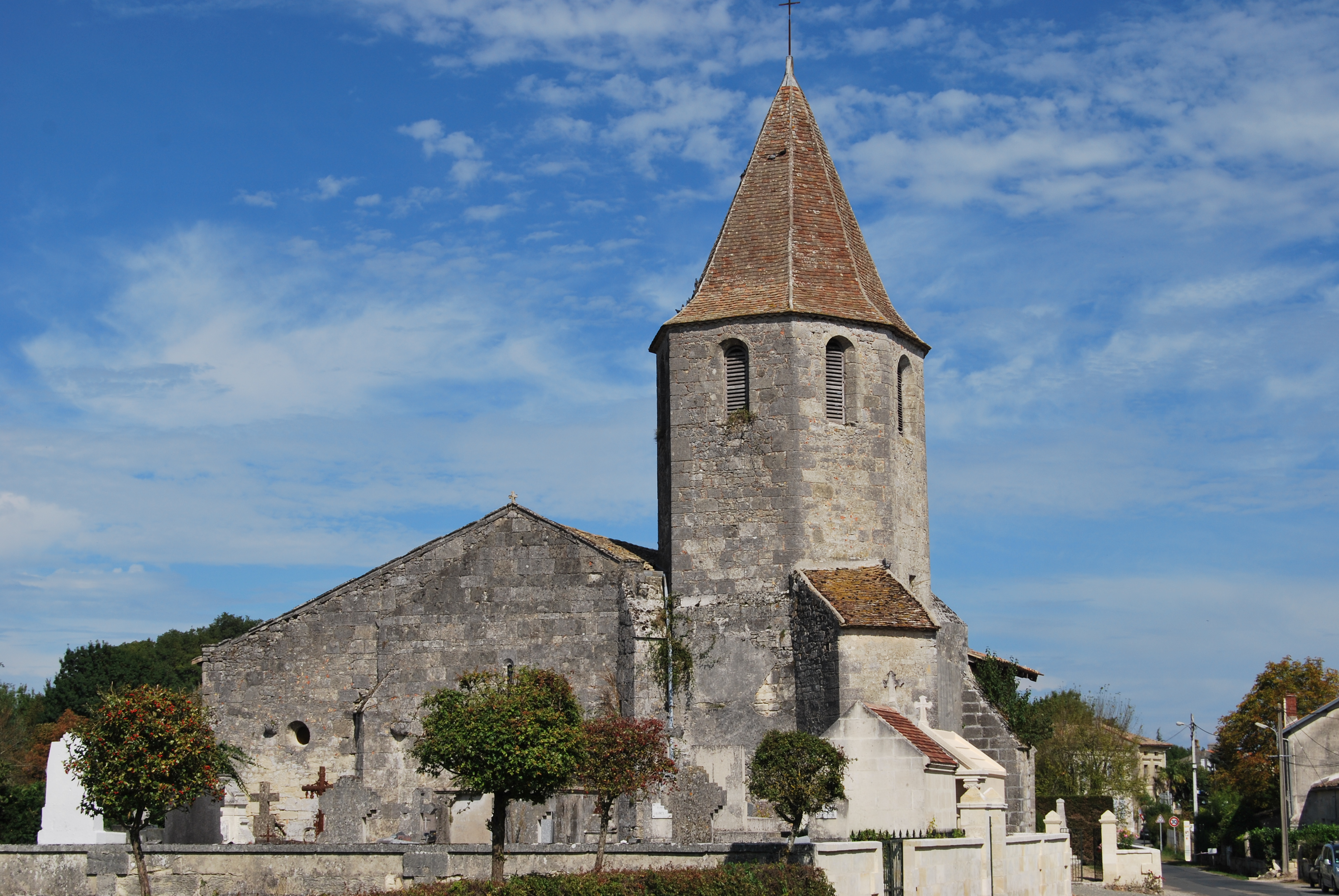
- The church in Puynormand

- Coat of arms
- Location of Puynormand
- Location within France Location within Nouvelle-Aquitaine
- Coordinates: 44°59′01″N 0°00′01″E
- Country: France
- Region: Nouvelle-Aquitaine
- Department: Gironde
- Arrondissement: Libourne
- Canton: Le Nord-Libournais
- Intercommunality: CA Libournais

Government
  - Mayor (2024–2026): Mireille Bernede
- Area^{1}: 7.64 km^{2} (2.95 sq mi)
- Elevation: 92 m (302 ft)
- Highest elevation: 117 m (384 ft)
- Lowest elevation: 32 m (105 ft)
- Population (2023): 305
  - Density: 39.9/km^{2} (103/sq mi)
- Time zone: UTC+01:00 (CET)
  - Summer (DST): UTC+02:00 (CEST)
- INSEE/Postal code: 33347 /33660
- ^{1} French Land Register data, which excludes lakes, ponds, glaciers > 1 km^{2} (0.386 sq mi or 247 acres) and river estuaries.

Puynormand (French pronunciation: [pɥinɔʁmɑ̃]; Occitan: Pueinarmand) is a commune in the Gironde department in Nouvelle-Aquitaine in southwestern France.

== Population ==
Historical population
Year	Pop.	±% p.a.
1968	284	—
1975	272	−0.61%
1982	228	−2.49%
1990	244	+0.85%
1999	247	+0.14%
2007	304	+2.63%
2012	314	+0.65%
2017	302	−0.78%
2023	305	+0.16%
Source: INSEE

== See also ==
- Communes of the Gironde department
