= Les Peintures =

- Commune
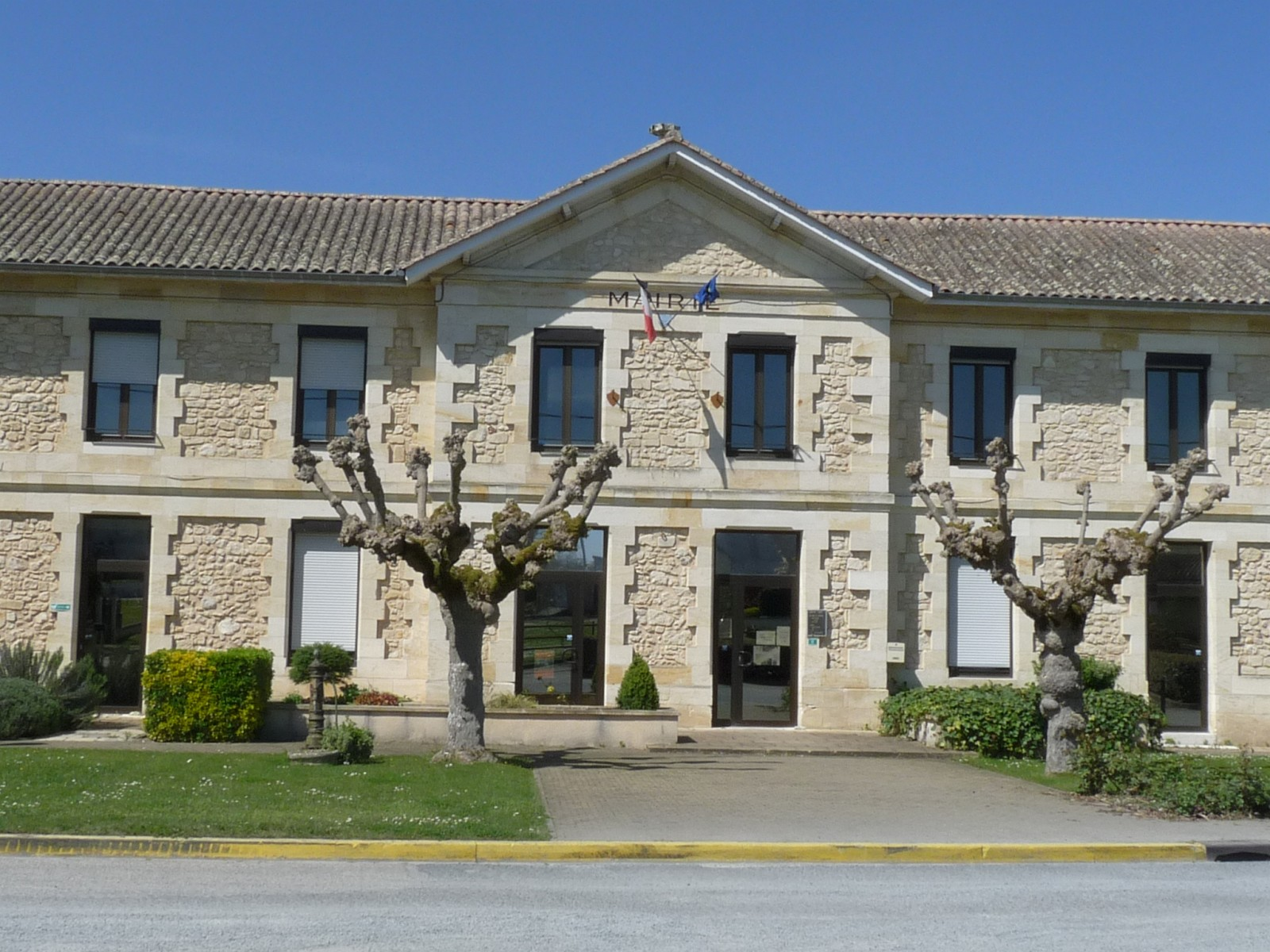
- The town hall in Les Peintures
- Location of Les Peintures
- Location within France Location within Nouvelle-Aquitaine
- Coordinates: 45°04′09″N 0°05′48″W
- Country: France
- Region: Nouvelle-Aquitaine
- Department: Gironde
- Arrondissement: Libourne
- Canton: Le Nord-Libournais
- Intercommunality: CA Libournais

Government
  - Mayor (2020–2026): Armand Battiston
- Area^{1}: 13.13 km^{2} (5.07 sq mi)
- Elevation: 22 m (72 ft)
- Highest elevation: 31 m (102 ft)
- Lowest elevation: 5 m (16 ft)
- Population (2023): 1,620
  - Density: 123/km^{2} (320/sq mi)
- Time zone: UTC+01:00 (CET)
  - Summer (DST): UTC+02:00 (CEST)
- INSEE/Postal code: 33315 /33230
- ^{1} French Land Register data, which excludes lakes, ponds, glaciers > 1 km^{2} (0.386 sq mi or 247 acres) and river estuaries.

Les Peintures (French pronunciation: [le pɛ̃tyʁ]; Occitan: Pinturas) is a commune in the Gironde department in Nouvelle-Aquitaine in southwestern France.

== Population ==
Historical population
Year	Pop.	±% p.a.
1968	1,038	—
1975	1,021	−0.24%
1982	1,080	+0.81%
1990	1,118	+0.43%
1999	1,197	+0.76%
2007	1,473	+2.63%
2012	1,564	+1.21%
2017	1,583	+0.24%
2023	1,620	+0.39%
Source: INSEE

== See also ==
- Communes of the Gironde department
