= Lapouyade =

- Commune
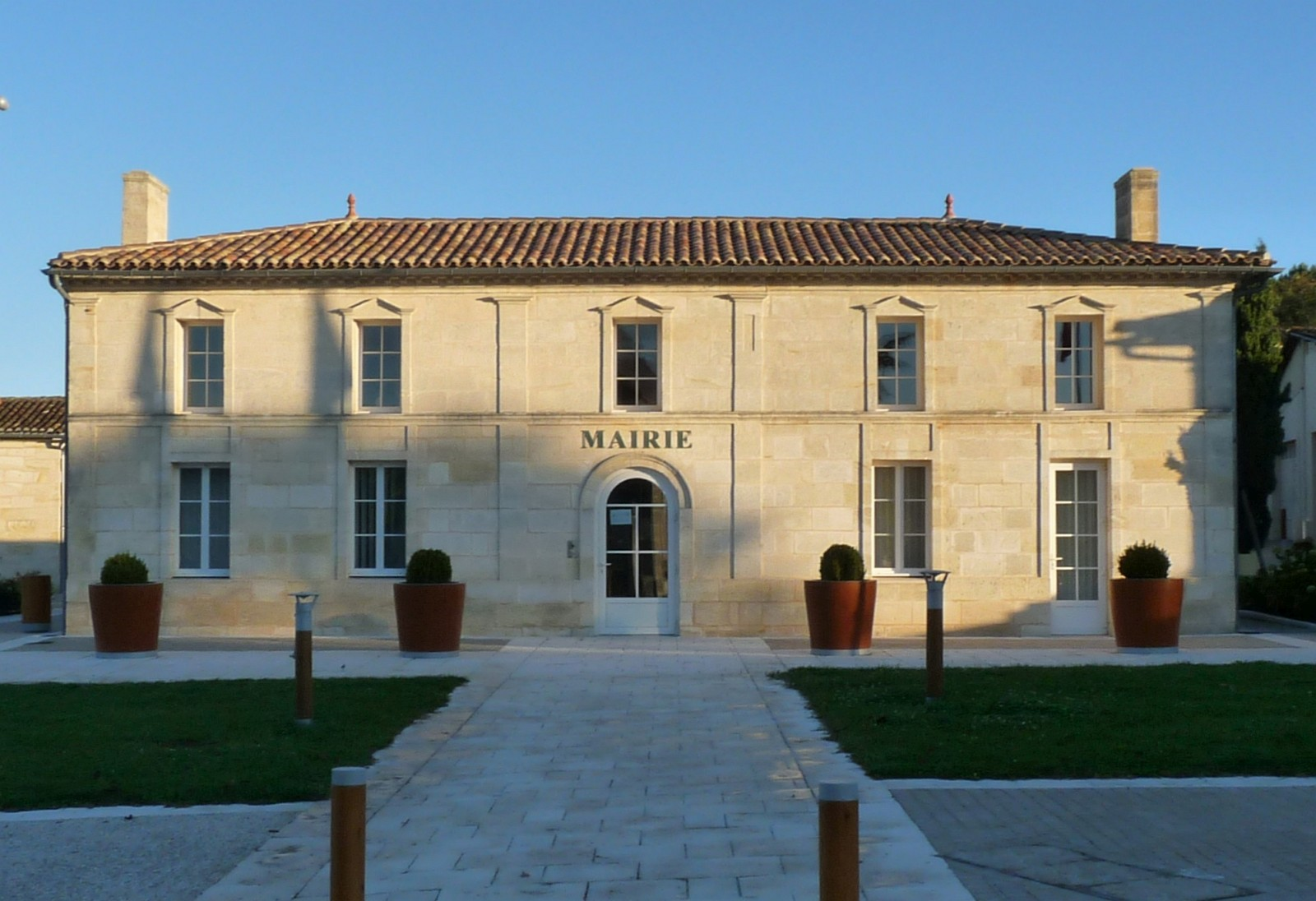
- The town hall in Lapouyade

- Coat of arms
- Location of Lapouyade
- Location within France Location within Nouvelle-Aquitaine
- Coordinates: 45°05′13″N 0°17′09″W
- Country: France
- Region: Nouvelle-Aquitaine
- Department: Gironde
- Arrondissement: Libourne
- Canton: Le Nord-Libournais
- Intercommunality: CA Libournais

Government
  - Mayor (2020–2026): Hélène Estrade
- Area^{1}: 25.8 km^{2} (10.0 sq mi)
- Elevation: 51 m (167 ft)
- Highest elevation: 103 m (338 ft)
- Lowest elevation: 30 m (98 ft)
- Population (2023): 550
  - Density: 21/km^{2} (55/sq mi)
- Time zone: UTC+01:00 (CET)
  - Summer (DST): UTC+02:00 (CEST)
- INSEE/Postal code: 33230 /33620
- ^{1} French Land Register data, which excludes lakes, ponds, glaciers > 1 km^{2} (0.386 sq mi or 247 acres) and river estuaries.

Lapouyade (French pronunciation: [lapujad]; Occitan: La Pojada) is a commune in the Gironde department in Nouvelle-Aquitaine in southwestern France.

== Population ==
Historical population
Year	Pop.	±% p.a.
1968	525	—
1975	484	−1.15%
1982	452	−0.97%
1990	476	+0.65%
1999	429	−1.15%
2007	437	+0.23%
2012	493	+2.44%
2017	498	+0.20%
2023	550	+1.67%
Source: INSEE

== See also ==
- Communes of the Gironde department
