= Abzac, Gironde =

Abzac
- Commune
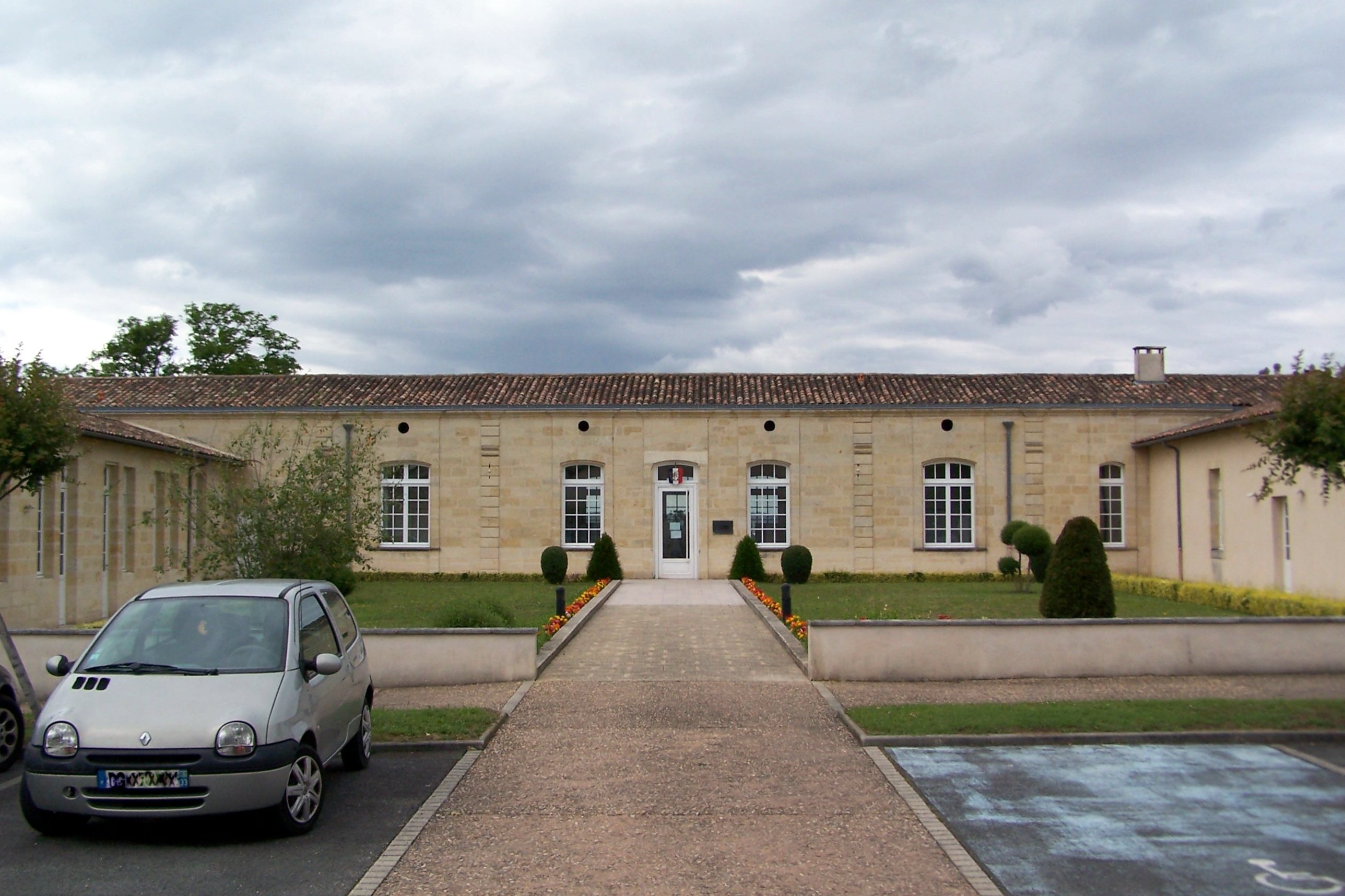
- Town hall

- Coat of arms
- Location of Abzac
- Location within France Location within Nouvelle-Aquitaine
- Coordinates: 45°01′03″N 0°07′34″W
- Country: France
- Region: Nouvelle-Aquitaine
- Department: Gironde
- Arrondissement: Libourne
- Canton: Le Nord-Libournais
- Intercommunality: CA Libournais

Government
  - Mayor (2025–2026): Gregory Bordat
- Area^{1}: 13.44 km^{2} (5.19 sq mi)
- Elevation: 55 m (180 ft)
- Highest elevation: 65 m (213 ft)
- Lowest elevation: 5 m (16 ft)
- Population (2023): 2,048
  - Density: 152.4/km^{2} (394.7/sq mi)
- Demonym(s): Abzacais, Abzacaises
- Time zone: UTC+01:00 (CET)
  - Summer (DST): UTC+02:00 (CEST)
- INSEE/Postal code: 33001 /33230
- ^{1} French Land Register data, which excludes lakes, ponds, glaciers > 1 km^{2} (0.386 sq mi or 247 acres) and river estuaries.

Abzac (French pronunciation: [abzak]) is a commune in the Gironde department in southwestern Metropolitan France.

== Population ==
Historical population
| Year | Pop. | ±% p.a. |
|---|---|---|
| 1968 | 1,474 | — |
| 1975 | 1,426 | −0.47% |
| 1982 | 1,475 | +0.48% |
| 1990 | 1,472 | −0.03% |
| 1999 | 1,599 | +0.92% |
| 2007 | 1,721 | +0.92% |
| 2012 | 1,858 | +1.54% |
| 2017 | 1,937 | +0.84% |
| 2023 | 2,048 | +0.93% |
Source: INSEE

== See also ==
- Communes of the Gironde department
