= Saint-Christophe-de-Double =

- Commune
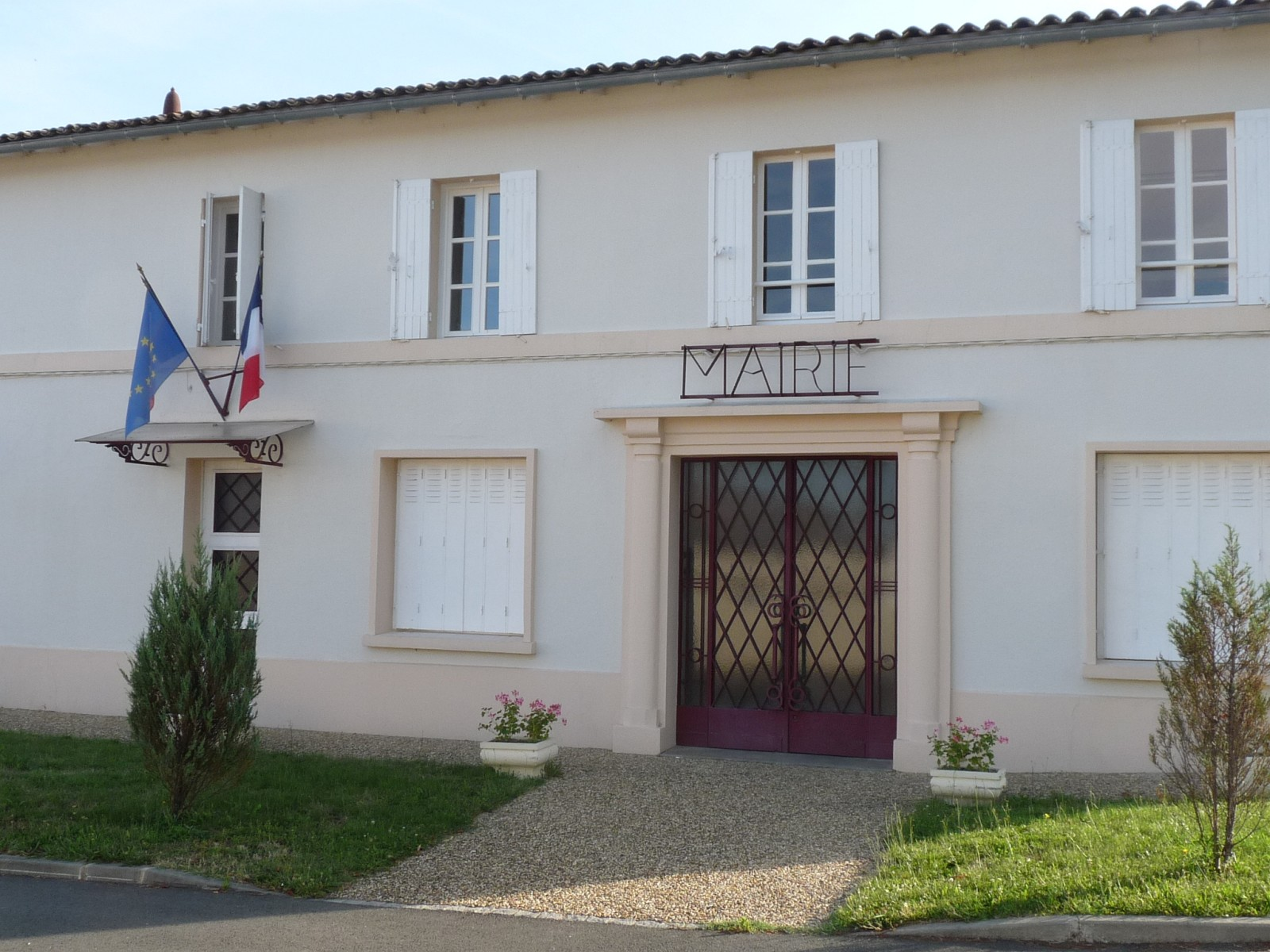
- The town hall in Saint-Christophe-de-Double
- Location of Saint-Christophe-de-Double
- Location within France Location within Nouvelle-Aquitaine
- Coordinates: 45°04′53″N 0°01′00″E
- Country: France
- Region: Nouvelle-Aquitaine
- Department: Gironde
- Arrondissement: Libourne
- Canton: Le Nord-Libournais
- Intercommunality: CA Libournais

Government
  - Mayor (2020–2026): Martine Lecouleux
- Area^{1}: 36.13 km^{2} (13.95 sq mi)
- Elevation: 89 m (292 ft)
- Highest elevation: 108 m (354 ft)
- Lowest elevation: 24 m (79 ft)
- Population (2023): 595
  - Density: 16.5/km^{2} (42.7/sq mi)
- Time zone: UTC+01:00 (CET)
  - Summer (DST): UTC+02:00 (CEST)
- INSEE/Postal code: 33385 /33230
- ^{1} French Land Register data, which excludes lakes, ponds, glaciers > 1 km^{2} (0.386 sq mi or 247 acres) and river estuaries.

Saint-Christophe-de-Double (Occitan: Sant Christòfa de Doble) is a commune in the Gironde department in Nouvelle-Aquitaine in southwestern France.

== Population ==
Historical population
Year	Pop.	±% p.a.
1968	696	—
1975	619	−1.66%
1982	534	−2.09%
1990	564	+0.69%
1999	578	+0.27%
2007	644	+1.36%
2012	662	+0.55%
2017	732	+2.03%
2023	595	−3.39%
Source: INSEE

== See also ==
- Communes of the Gironde department
