= Naujan-et-Postiac =

- Commune
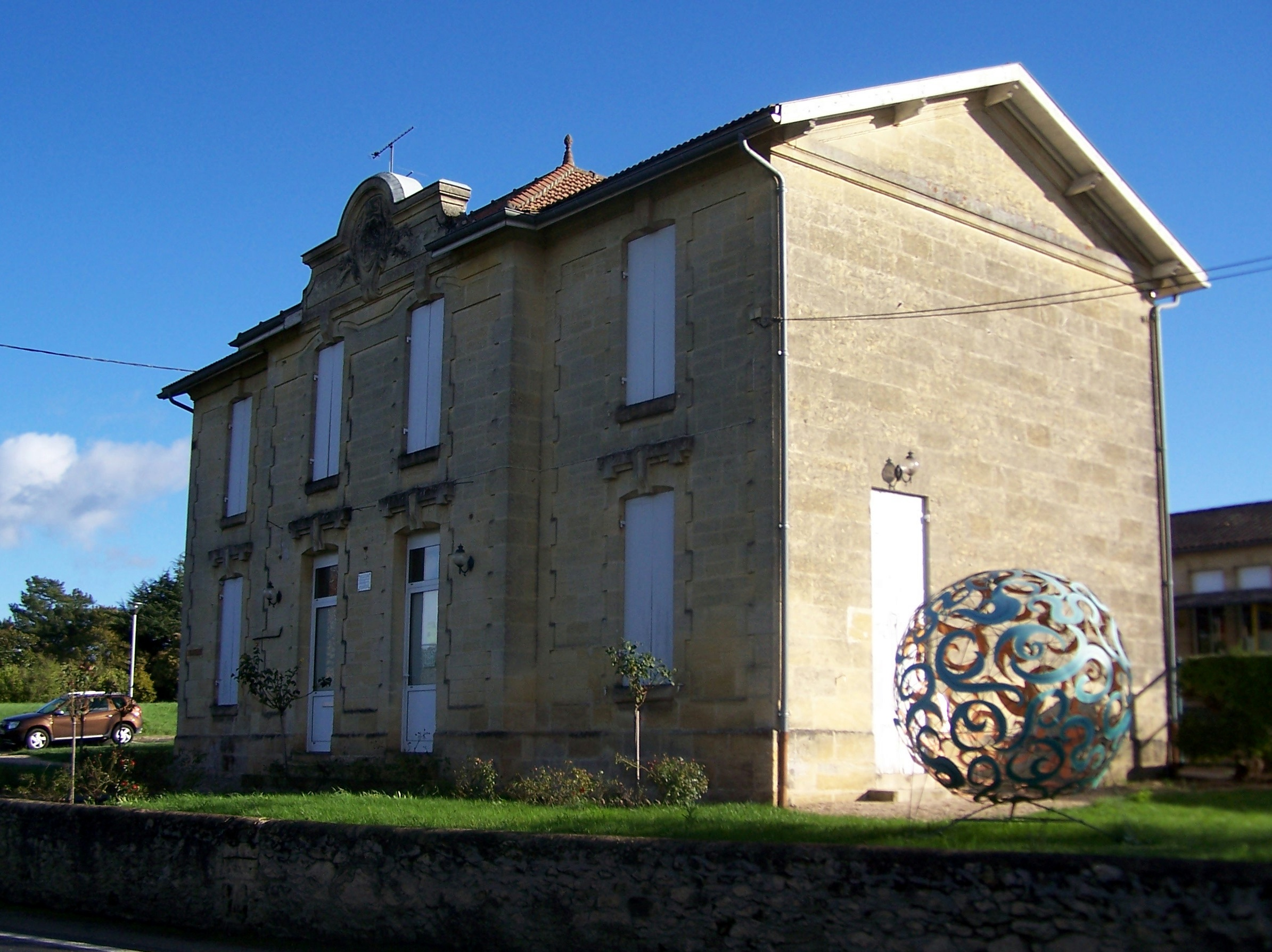
- Town hall

- Coat of arms
- Location of Naujan-et-Postiac
- Location within France Location within Nouvelle-Aquitaine
- Coordinates: 44°47′22″N 0°10′49″W
- Country: France
- Region: Nouvelle-Aquitaine
- Department: Gironde
- Arrondissement: Libourne
- Canton: Les Coteaux de Dordogne

Government
  - Mayor (2020–2026): François Raynaud
- Area^{1}: 11.1 km^{2} (4.3 sq mi)
- Elevation: 40 m (130 ft)
- Highest elevation: 91 m (299 ft)
- Lowest elevation: 6 m (20 ft)
- Population (2023): 599
  - Density: 54.0/km^{2} (140/sq mi)
- Time zone: UTC+01:00 (CET)
  - Summer (DST): UTC+02:00 (CEST)
- INSEE/Postal code: 33301 /33420
- ^{1} French Land Register data, which excludes lakes, ponds, glaciers > 1 km^{2} (0.386 sq mi or 247 acres) and river estuaries.

Naujan-et-Postiac (French pronunciation: [noʒɑ̃ e pɔstjak]; Occitan: Naujan e Postiac) is a commune in the Gironde department in Nouvelle-Aquitaine in southwestern France.

The commune is located in the Entre-Deux-Mers wine-growing region, 35 km from Bordeaux and 6 km south of the river Dordogne.

The town is denoted by its rural architecture, where the most part of residential and religious buildings are maintained in the traditional style.

The present administrative and geographical situation of the commune comes from the association of two villages and their dependencies before the French Revolution, and the confirmation in the new national organization created in 1802. The church of the village of Postiac, which became then private property is slowly disappearing under growing trees.

== Geography ==
=== Location ===
Naujan-et-Postiac is a commune in the far south of the former canton of Branne, the new canton of Les Côteaux de Dordogne, and the arrondissement of Libourne, bordering the former canton of Targon, the new canton of Entre-deux-Mers, and the arrondissement of Langon.

The settlement is largely scattered, as in most communes in the region, with numerous hamlets, outlying settlements, and localities, whose activity is linked to agriculture.

A small tributary of the Dordogne, the Engranne, itself swollen by an estey, separates the commune from its neighbor, Jugazan.

The commune is located 35 km east of Bordeaux, the departmental capital, 18 km south-southeast of Libourne, the arrondissement capital, and 6 km south of Branne, the seat of the Brannais community of communes.

=== Neighboring communes ===
The bordering communes are Rauzan to the northeast, Jugazan to the east, Bellefond to the southeast, Romagne to the southwest, Daignac to the west, Guillac to the northwest, Lugaignac to the north-northwest and Saint-Aubin-de-Branne to the north.

=== Climate ===
Historically, the commune has been exposed to an Aquitaine oceanic climate. In 2020, Météo-France published a typology of climates in metropolitan France, in which the commune is exposed to an oceanic climate and is located in the Aquitaine-Gascon climate region, characterized by abundant rainfall in spring and moderate rainfall in autumn, low sunshine in spring, hot summers (19.5 °C), light winds, frequent fog in autumn and winter, and frequent thunderstorms in summer (15 to 20 days).

For the period 1971–2000, the average annual temperature was 12.8 °C, with an annual temperature range of 14.8 °C. The average annual cumulative precipitation was 839 mm, with 11.8 days of precipitation in January and 6.9 days in July. For the period 1991-2020, the average annual temperature observed at the nearest weather station, located in the commune of Saint-Émilion 12 km, is 13.9 °C and the average annual cumulative precipitation is 798.1 mm. For the future, the climatic parameters of the commune estimated for 2050 according to different greenhouse gas emission scenarios can be consulted on a dedicated site published by Météo-France in November 2022.

== Urban planning ==
=== Typology ===
As of 1 January 2024, Naujan-et-Postiac is categorized as a rural commune with dispersed housing, according to the new seven-level communal density grid defined by INSEE in 2022. It is located outside an urban unit. Furthermore, the commune is part of the Bordeaux catchment area, of which it is a suburban commune. This area, which includes 275 communes, is categorized in areas of 700,000 inhabitants or more (excluding Paris).

=== Land use ===
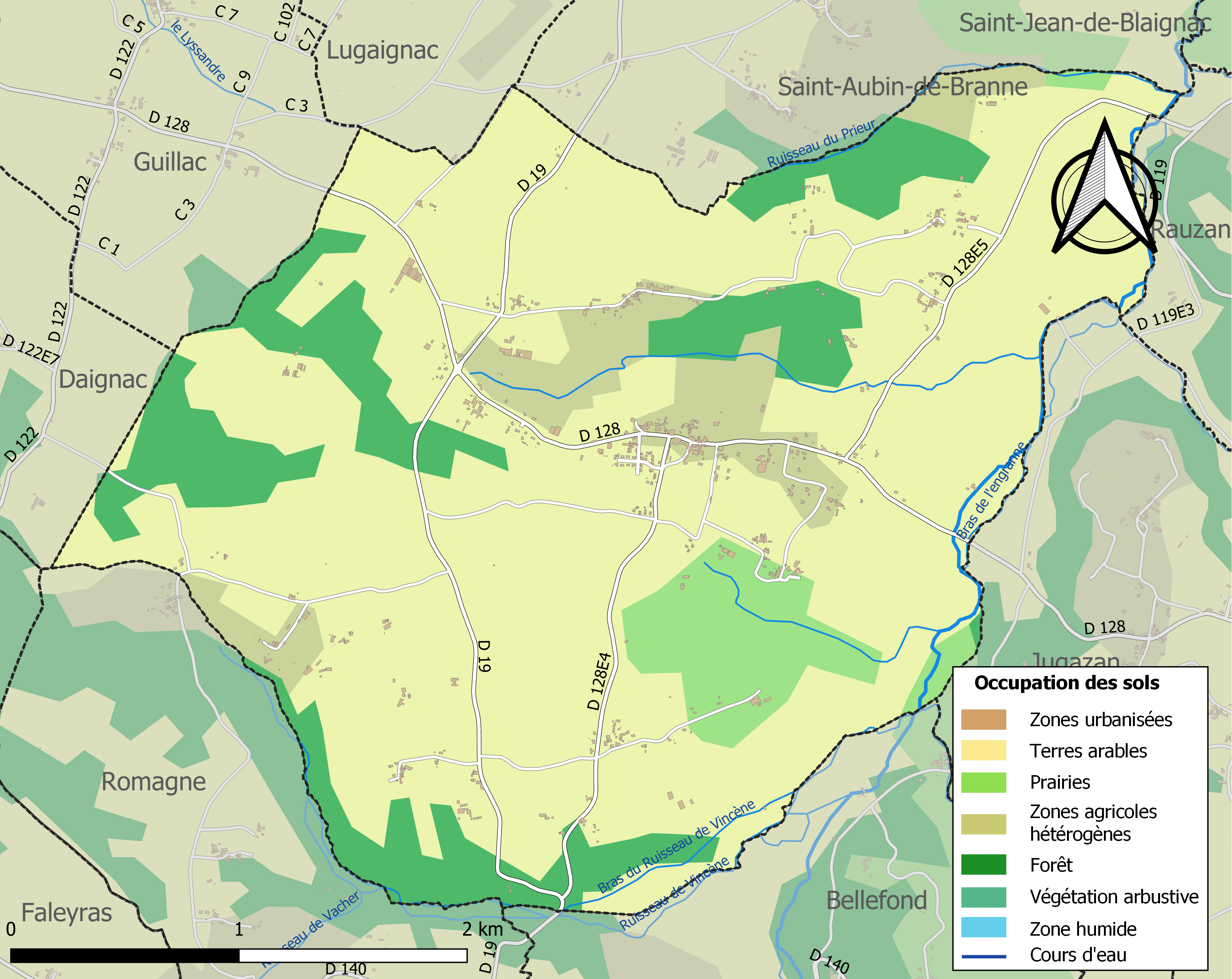
Map of infrastructure and land use in the commune in 2018 (CLC).

The land use of the commune, as shown in the European biophysical land use database Corine Land Cover (CLC), is marked by the importance of agricultural land (85.6% in 2018), an increase compared to 1990 (84.3%). The detailed breakdown in 2018 is as follows: permanent crops (61.6%), forests (14.4%), arable land (11%), heterogeneous agricultural areas (7.5%), meadows (5.6%). The evolution of the land use of the commune and its infrastructure can be observed on the various cartographic representations of the territory: the Cassini map (18th century), the general staff map (1820-1866) and the IGN maps or aerial photos for the current period (1950 to today).

=== Communication routes and transport ===
The main road connections are the D128 departmental road, which crosses the village and leads northwest to Guillac and southwest to Jugazan and Rauzan, and the D19 departmental road, which crosses the western part of the commune and leads north to Branne and south to Romagne. On the D128, about 500 meters east of the village, the D128e5 departmental road provides access to Saint-Jean-de-Blaignac to the northeast.

The nearest access to the A62 motorway (Bordeaux-Toulouse) is access point 2, known as Podensac, which is 29 km southwest. Access point 1, known as Bazas, to the A65 motorway (Langon-Pau) is 44 km south. The nearest access to the A89 motorway (Bordeaux-Lyon) is the motorway interchange with Route Nationale 89, located 16 km northwest.

The nearest SNCF train station is Libourne, 18 km northwest by road, on the TGV Atlantique Paris-Bordeaux line, the Intercités Lyon-Bordeaux line, and the TER Nouvelle-Aquitaine network. Cérons train station on the Bordeaux-Sète TER Nouvelle-Aquitaine line is 25 km southwest by road.

=== Major risks ===
The territory of the commune of Naujan-et-Postiac is vulnerable to various natural hazards: meteorological (storm, thunderstorm, snow, extreme cold, heatwave or drought), floods, ground movements and earthquakes (very low seismicity). It is also exposed to a technological risk, the rupture of a dam. A site published by the BRGM allows the assessment of risks to properties located in the region.

==== Natural risks ====
The commune has been declared a natural disaster site due to damage caused by floods and mudslides in 1982, 1983, 1999, and 2009.

Ground movements likely to occur in the commune include subsidence and collapses related to underground cavities (excluding mines). To better understand the risk of land subsidence, the national inventory of underground cavities allows for the location of those located in the commune.

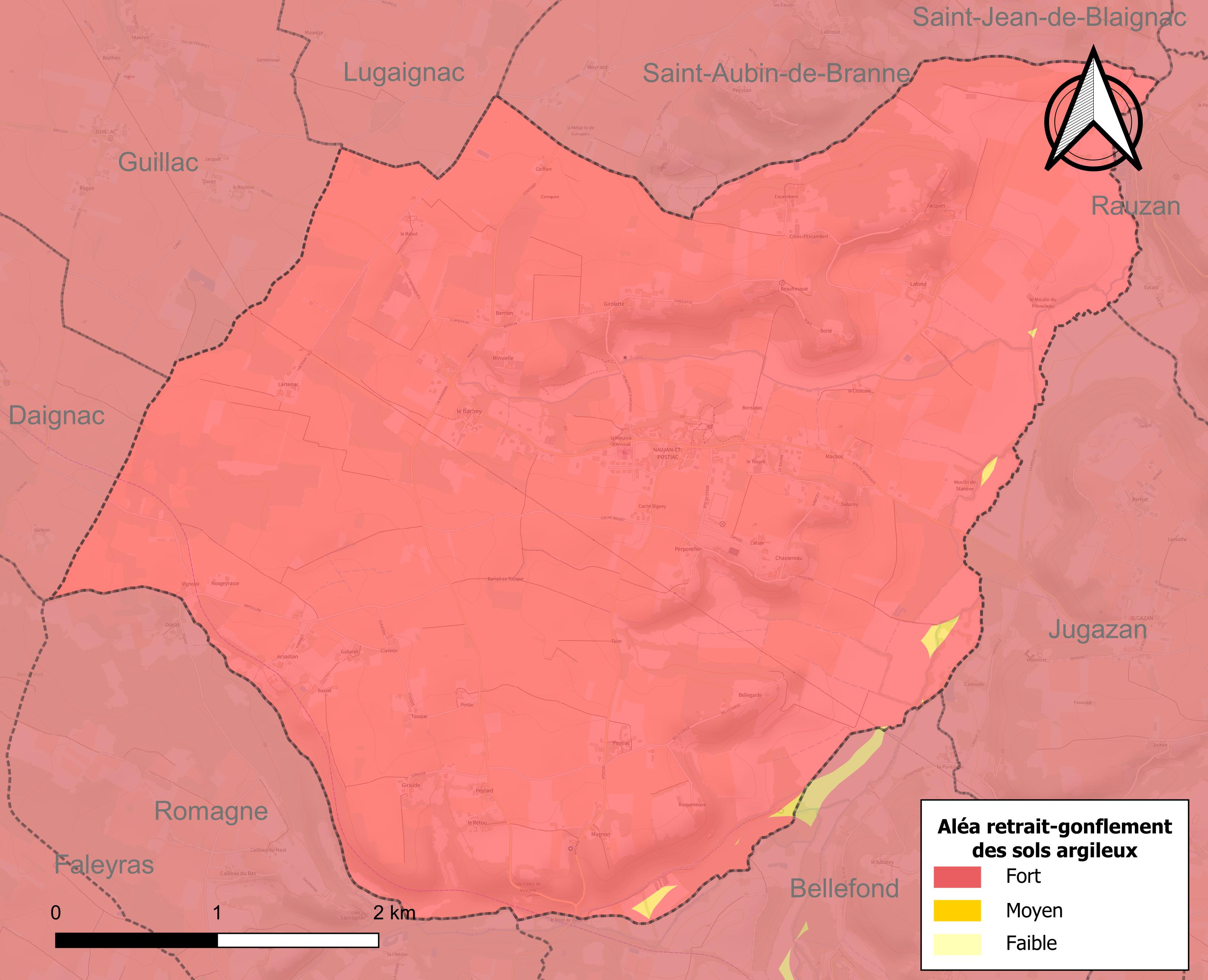
Map of the shrinkage-swelling hazard zones of clay soils in Naujan-et-Postiac.

The shrinkage-swelling of clay soils can cause significant damage to buildings in the event of alternating periods of drought and rain. The entire commune is at medium or high risk (67.4% at the departmental level and 48.5% at the national level). Of the 285 buildings counted in the commune in 2019, 285 are at medium or high risk, i.e., 100%, compared to 84% at the departmental level and 54% at the national level. A map of the national territory's exposure to the shrinkage-swelling of clay soils is available on the BRGM website.

Regarding land movements, the commune was declared to be in a state of natural disaster due to damage caused by drought in 2005 and 2015 and by land movements in 1999.

==== Technological risks ====
The municipality is also located downstream from the Bort-les-Orgues Dam, a class A structure on the Dordogne subject to PPI, with a reservoir of 477 million cubic meters. As such, it is likely to be affected by the flood wave following the rupture of this structure.

== Etymology ==
In Gascon, the name of the commune is Naujan e Postiac.

Naujan-et-Postiac comes in the two words, Naujan and Postiac. there is a possible meanings:

- Naujan. The old forms are parish Sancti Petri de Nauian, Donatus presbiter de Nauian, de Nauiano, apud Naugianum, all without date and that come from the cartulary of La Sauve. Toponymists disagree. Dauzat and Rostaing, followed by Astor (this cited by Bénédicte Boyrie-Fénié) need the suffix -anum and are by a Latin surname *Navidius, derived from Navius (from navus, "ship", and the meaning will be "sailor, sailor"). Negre, quoted by B. Boyrie-Fénié, is for a "Roman (ic)" person name *Naevianus, derived from Naevius and does not need a suffix. B. Boyrie-Fénié chooses the surname Navigius, which is attested and precisely in Aquitaine, with the suffix -anum.
- Postiac. The old forms are terram of Posteac, parrochia de Posteac, both without date and that come from the cartulary of La Sauve. Bénédicte Boyrie-Fénié thinks that Postiac comes from *Postius, from whom Postinius, attested, seems to come, and from the suffix -acum, Latinization of the Welsh suffix -ācon. In fact, *Postiacum cannot give Postiac according to the normal rules of evolution, but *Poissac (cf. Possac to Agmé, which perhaps has another etime). Precisely, in this Entre-Deux-Mers that multiplies the evidence of an old presence of the amusement of -n- intervocalic (Espiet < *Espinet, Mouliets < *Molinets, perhaps Lestiac < *Lestinac, and in the very Agenais, Landerrouat < *Landerronat), represent that an old *Postenac (or *Postenag, *Postenago, according to the date of the amusement of -n-). *Postinus, variant of Postinius, may agree. Postiac was therefore probably an old large ancient property owned by Postinus.

== History ==
Like the rest of the Entre-deux-Mers region, the settlement of this territory is ancient and intensified after the end of the first millennium, and especially after the Hundred Years' War, which brought a measure of security to rural settlements. At the same time as the nearby fortified towns became firmly established, numerous sparsely populated villages proliferated, giving the map of this area a unique appearance in the region. The subsequent stabilization of the population favored the preservation of traditional architecture.

During the French Revolution, the parish of Saint-Pierre de Naujan formed the commune of Naujan, and its annex, Notre-Dame de Postiac, formed the commune of Postiac. In the year 10, the commune of Postiac was annexed to that of Naujan, which became Naujan-et-Postiac.

On the administrative level, the grouping of the parishes of Naujean (dedicated to Saint John) and Postiac, within the county of Blaignac in the 18th century, was perpetuated by the Revolution (Year X) in the creation of a single commune. The enfeoffment and absorption of the second, smaller in area and population, were made definitive by the transfer of its church and associated elements (as part of the sale of national property), which subsequently became the private chapel and burial place of the holding family.

Viticulture, as in the entire region, is very ancient. The French Revolution, as in the rest of the country, profoundly changed the wine-growing landscape here. By dividing up the property of the Church and exiled nobles, and restoring freedom of cultivation, millions of vineyard owners were created.

Development was rapid under the Second Empire, a flourishing period before mildew or other phylloxera, when many estates added, in the chatelain style of the time, beautiful elements to the already existing rural heritage.

The administrative organization of the Republic, through its attachment to the canton of Branne (canton of Coteaux de Dordogne following the 2015 reorganization) and the district of Libourne, confirmed the northward orientation of trade and the fairly clear separation from the communes to the south, attached to the canton of Targon (canton of Entre-deux-Mers since 2015), and the arrondissement of Langon.

The growth of the Bordeaux metropolis, already very important for commerce, health, education, and the professional activity of many residents, only accentuates its heavy presence to the west, and imposes itself by its light pollution of the entire region. Some accents of dormitory housing, limited by the importance of viticulture in local activity, are visible especially by the direction of the twice-daily traffic on the departmental roads connecting the commune to Bordeaux or Libourne. Because of these relative proximities, the exodus of the 1960s has been interrupted, and almost reversed. The tourist activity, with several gîtes or guest houses, is developing reasonably.

== Economy ==
The local economy is based overwhelmingly on viticulture, to which a large portion of the commune's territory is dedicated. The wines produced, mostly red, belong to the Bordeaux or Bordeaux-Supérieur AOCs; the dry whites fall under the Entre-deux-Mers appellation.

Marketing from the estates is carried out according to three main methods:

- Bottled on the estate
- Sale to merchants in Libourne or Bordeaux, major trading centers (this method has become very rare)
- Contribution of the harvest to one of the nearest cooperative wineries, especially for the smaller estates.

This economic sector remains almost the sole provider of salaried employment in the commune.

The rural gîte and guesthouse business is growing and provides additional independent income.

== Culture and local heritage ==
=== Places and monuments ===
The heritage is preserved, as in many of the sparsely populated communes south of Branne: the common heritage, essentially religious, with its church; that linked to viticulture with numerous châteaux or estates; and the housing, dispersed for historical reasons.

- The Church of Saint-Pierre, built in the 12th century and enlarged in the 16th and 19th centuries, in the center of the village of Naujan, was listed as a historical monument in 2001.
- The Church of Notre-Dame de Postiac is a small rectangular building dating from the 11th and 12th centuries, except for the three northern recesses, which date from the 13th century. The church was deconsecrated in 1791 and abandoned. It is now in ruins.
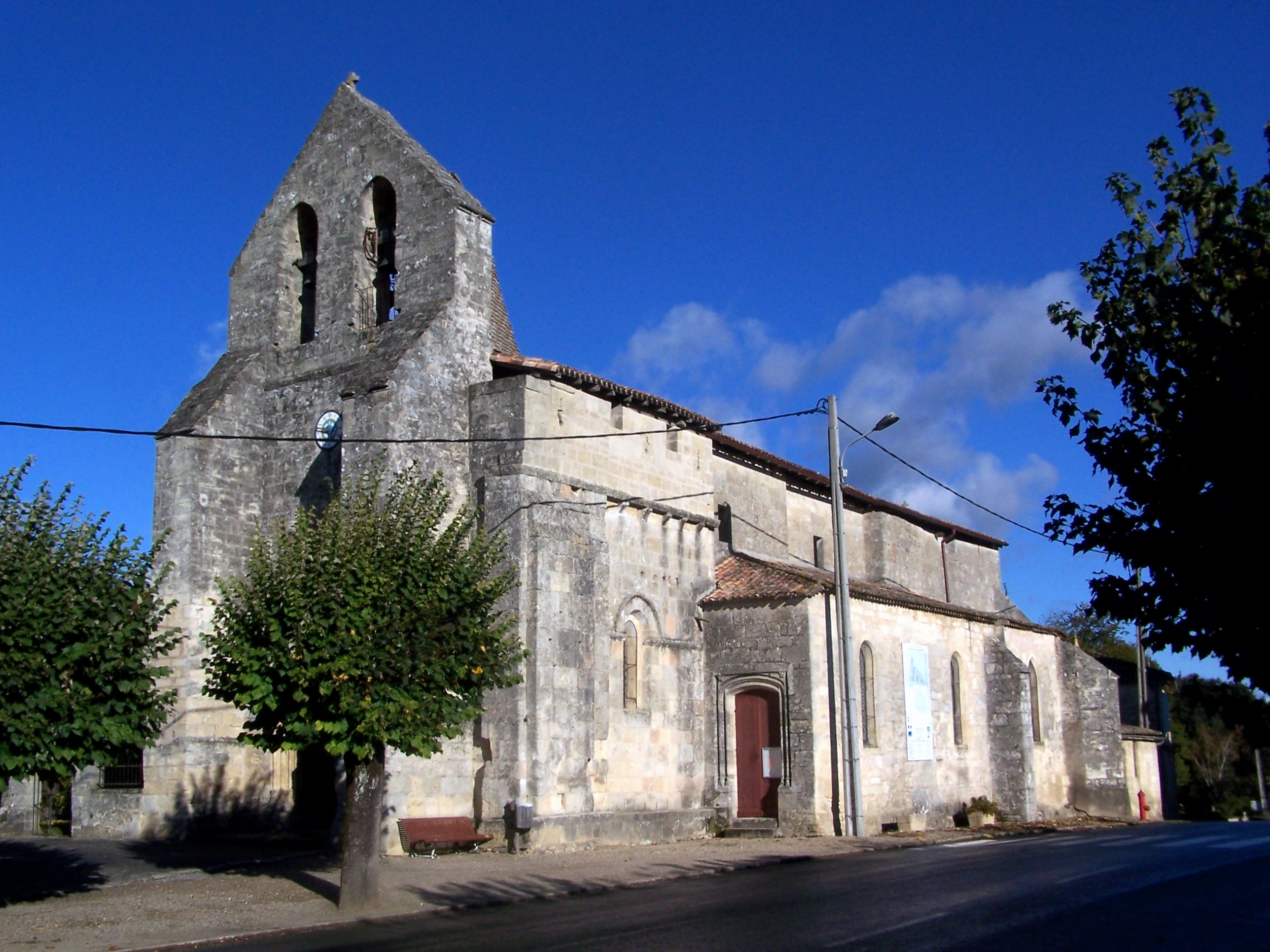
Saint Peter's Church, southwest view

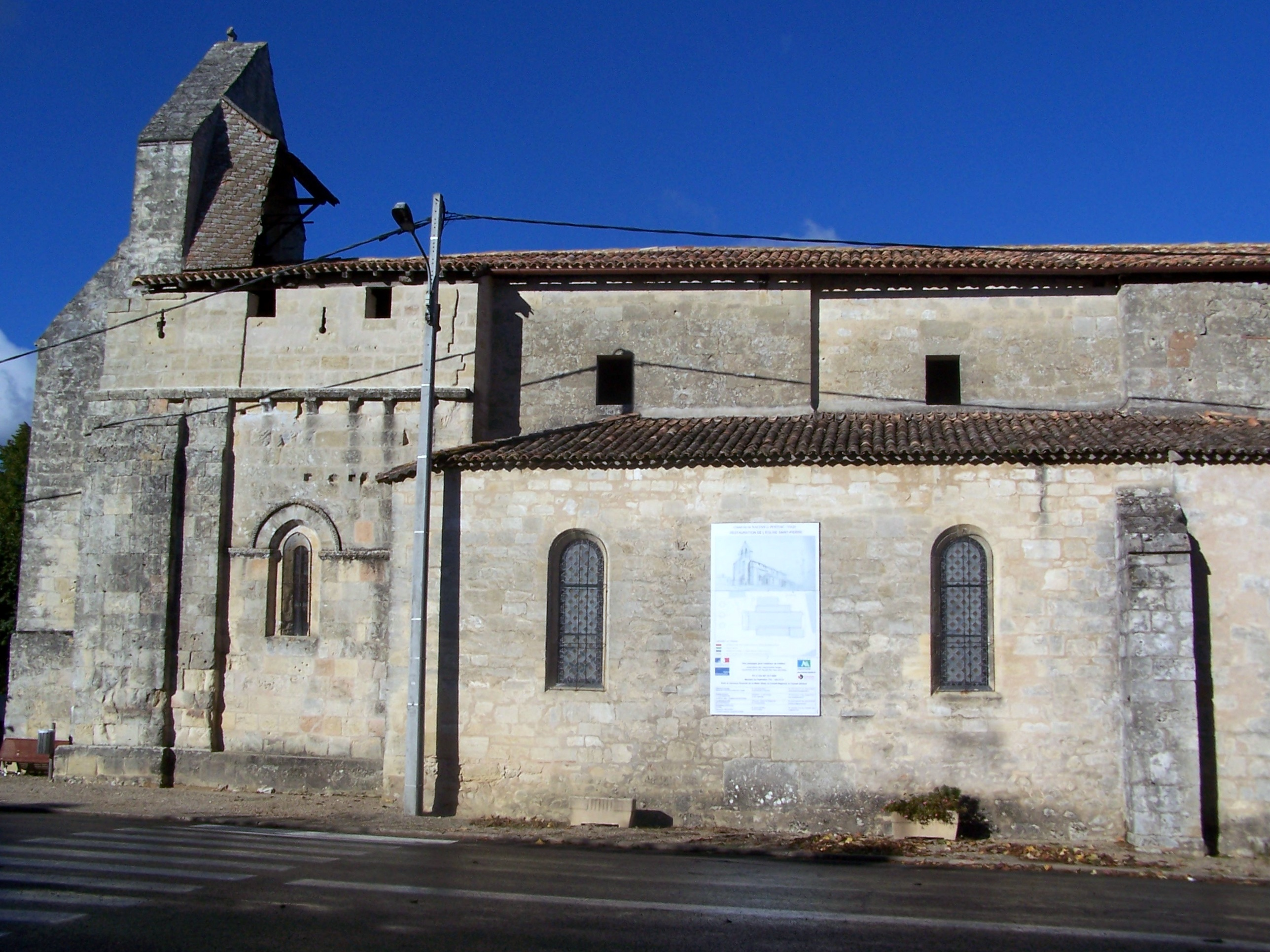
Saint Peter's Church, south view

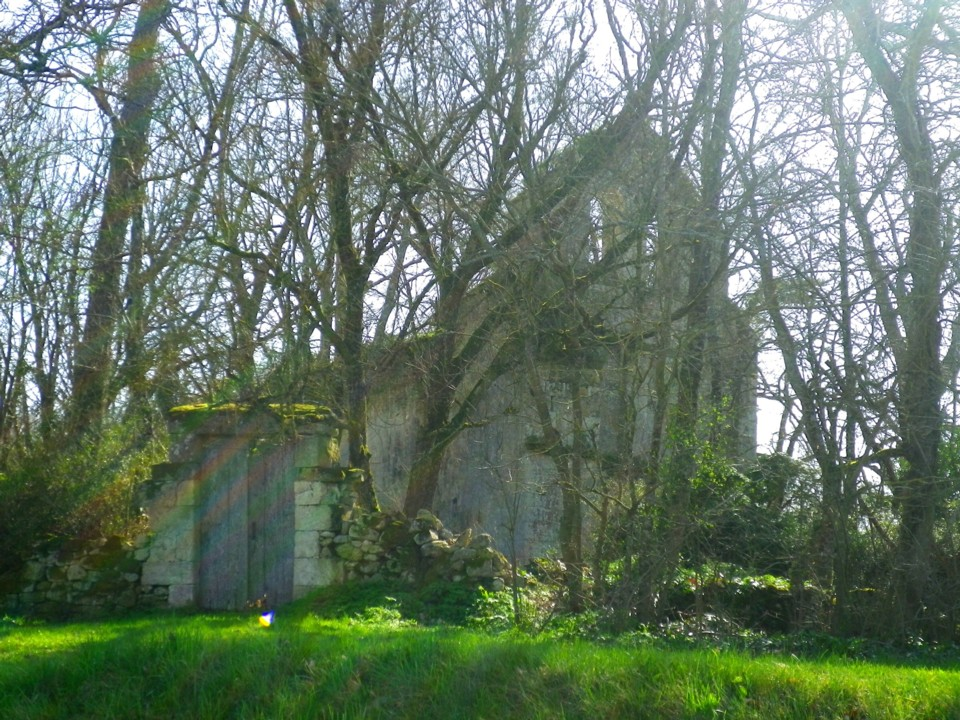
Notre-Dame Church

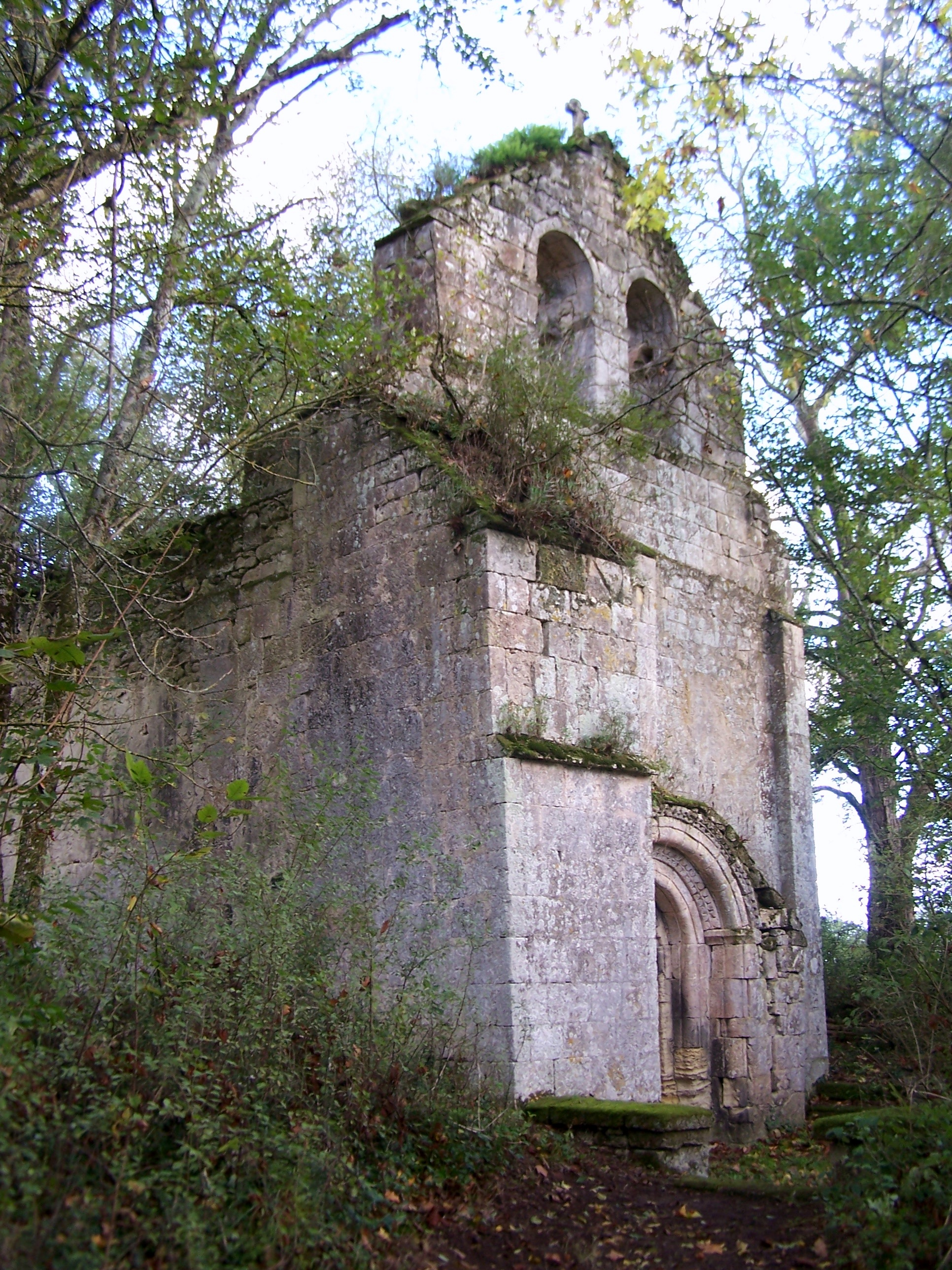
Notre-Dame Church, northwest view

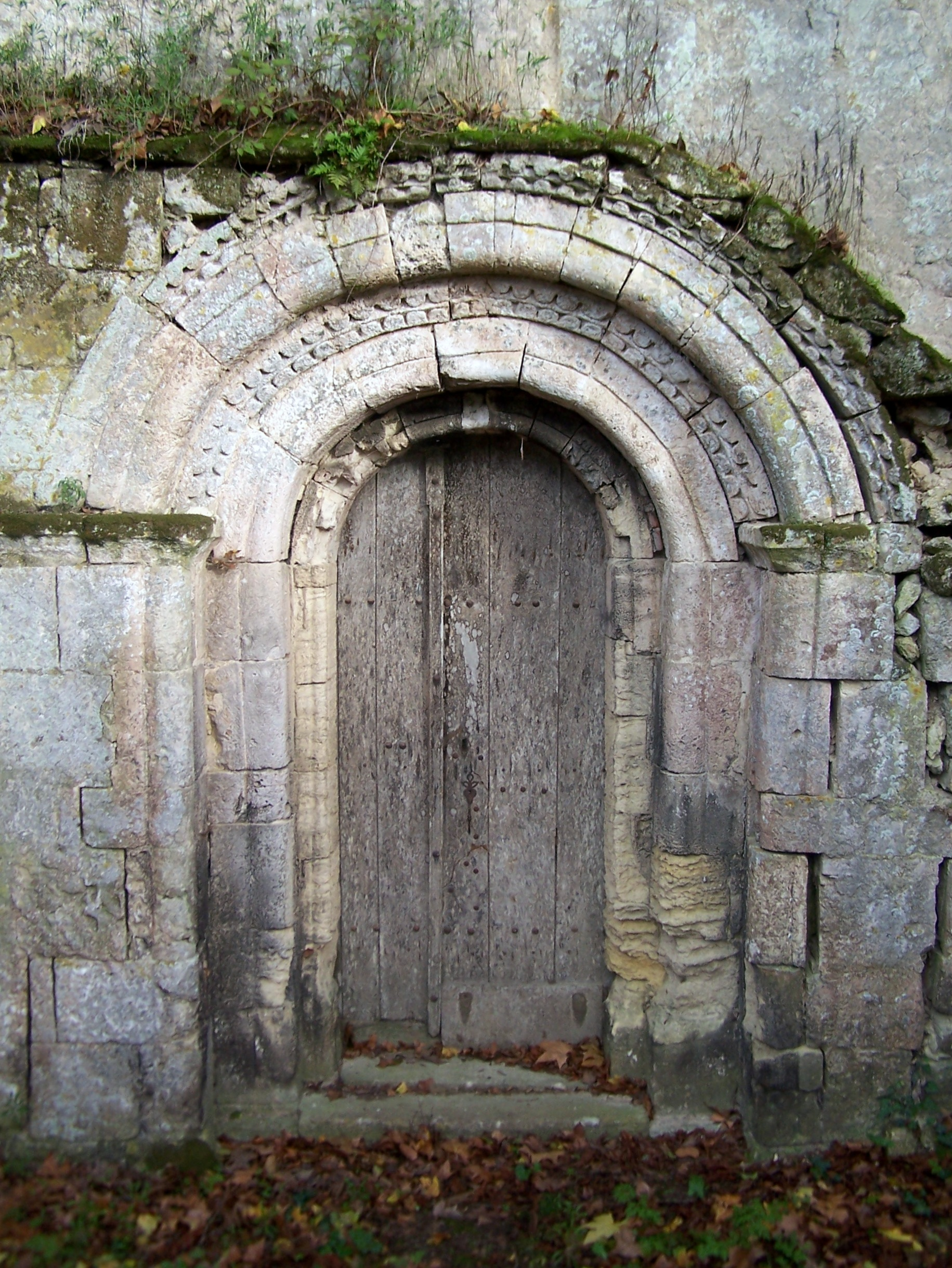
The Notre-Dame church, the portal

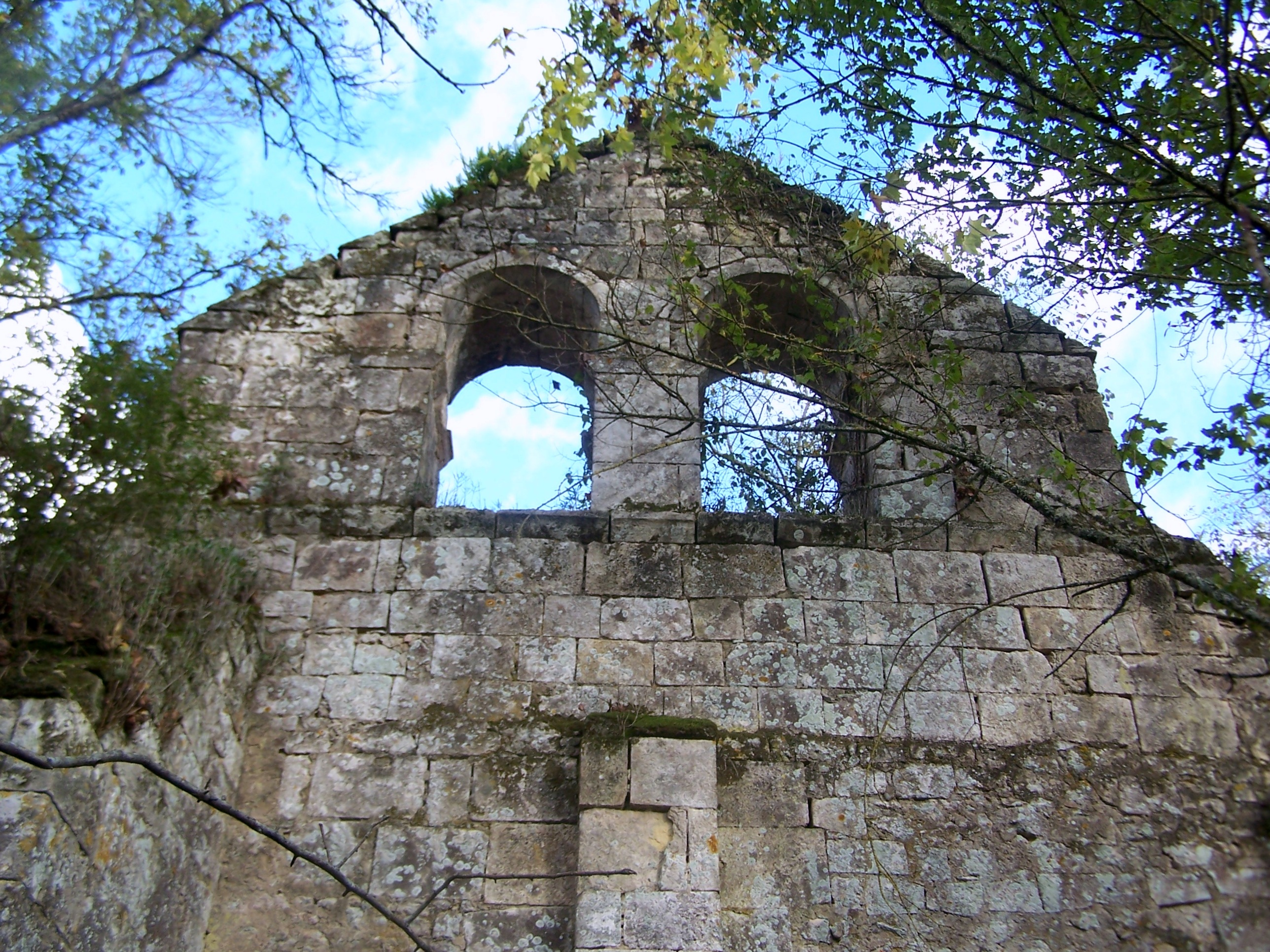
Notre-Dame church, the bell tower
- Mission crosses and crossroads crosses: Religious fervor was undermined during the French Revolution. Mission crosses were planted throughout France at the beginning of the 19th century. Each of them marks the passage of one of these diocesan missionaries who were charged at the time with leading a new evangelization of the countryside. Crossroads crosses, like wayside crosses, multiplied in the 19th century and were particularly intended to mark the boundaries of a parish and its various hamlets.
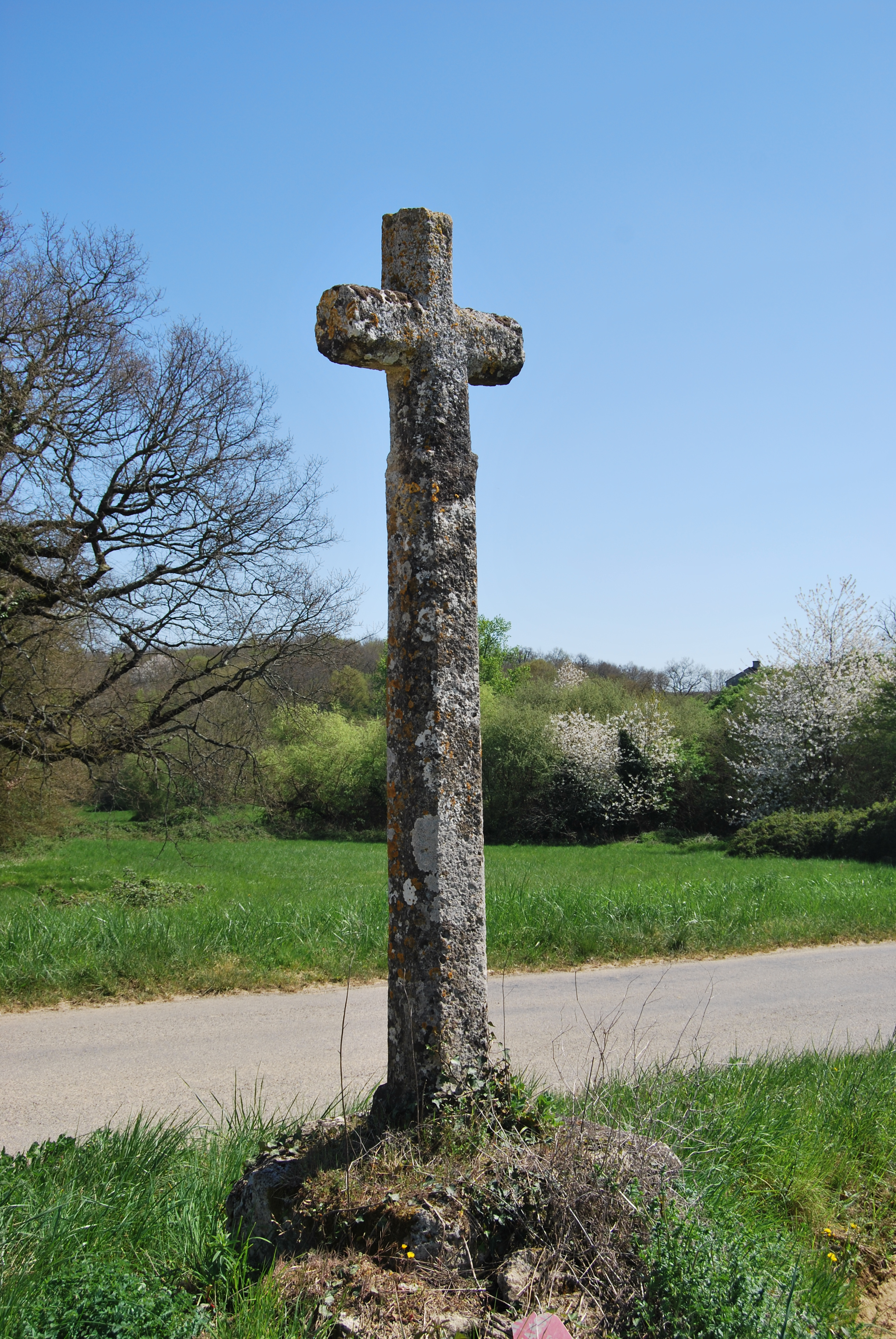
Crossroads

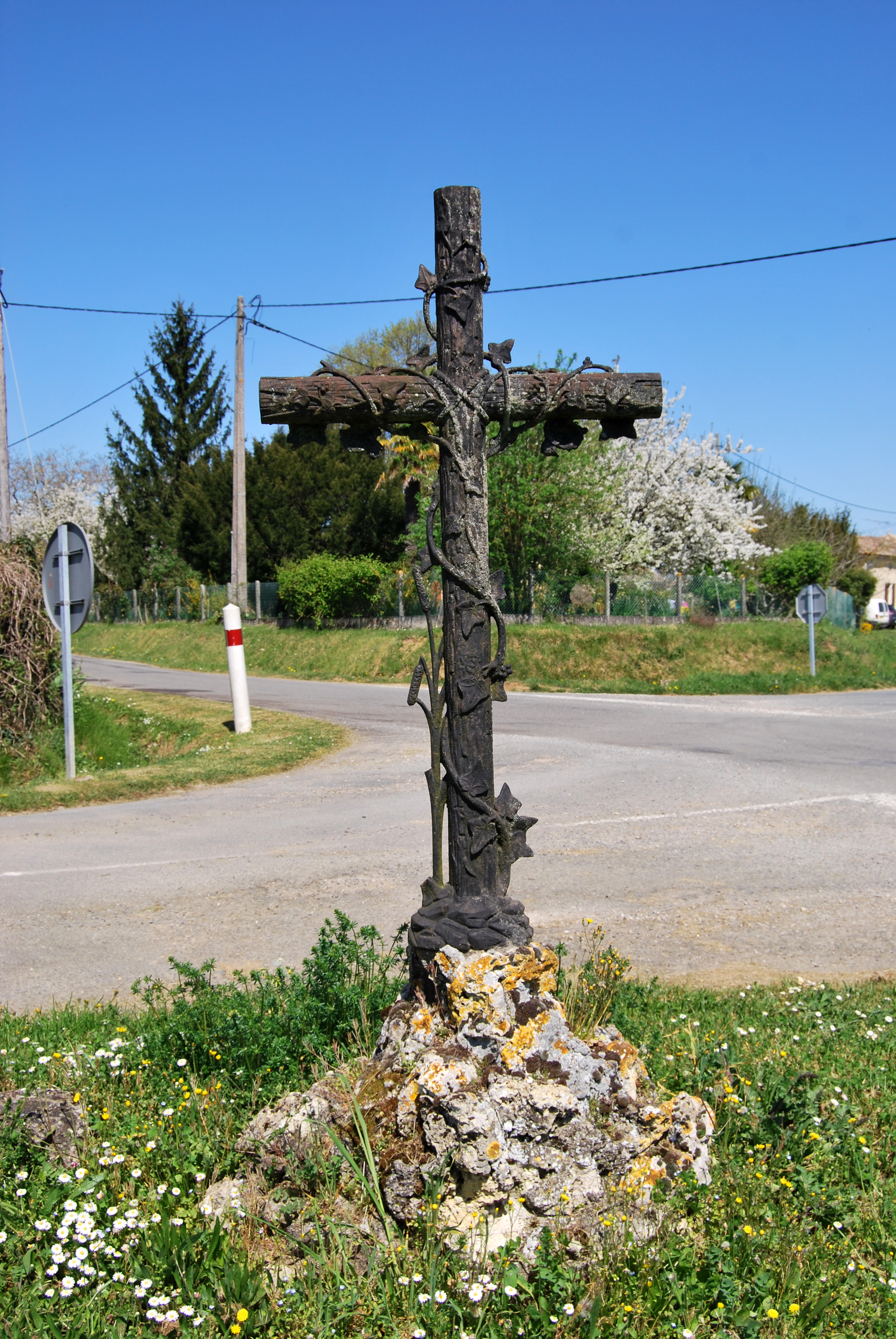
Postiac Mission Cross

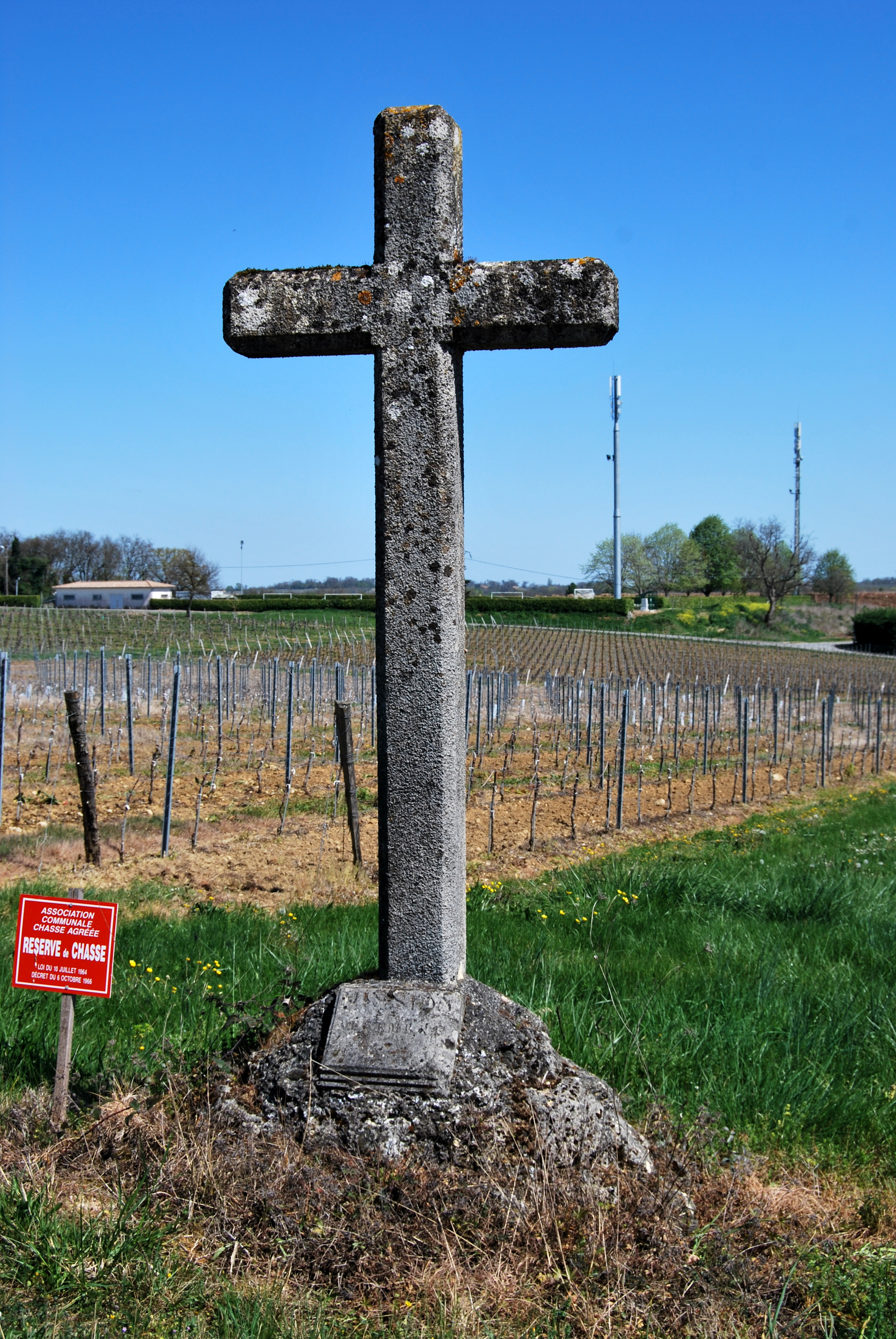
Naujan Mission Cross
- Arpaillan Castle, private property.
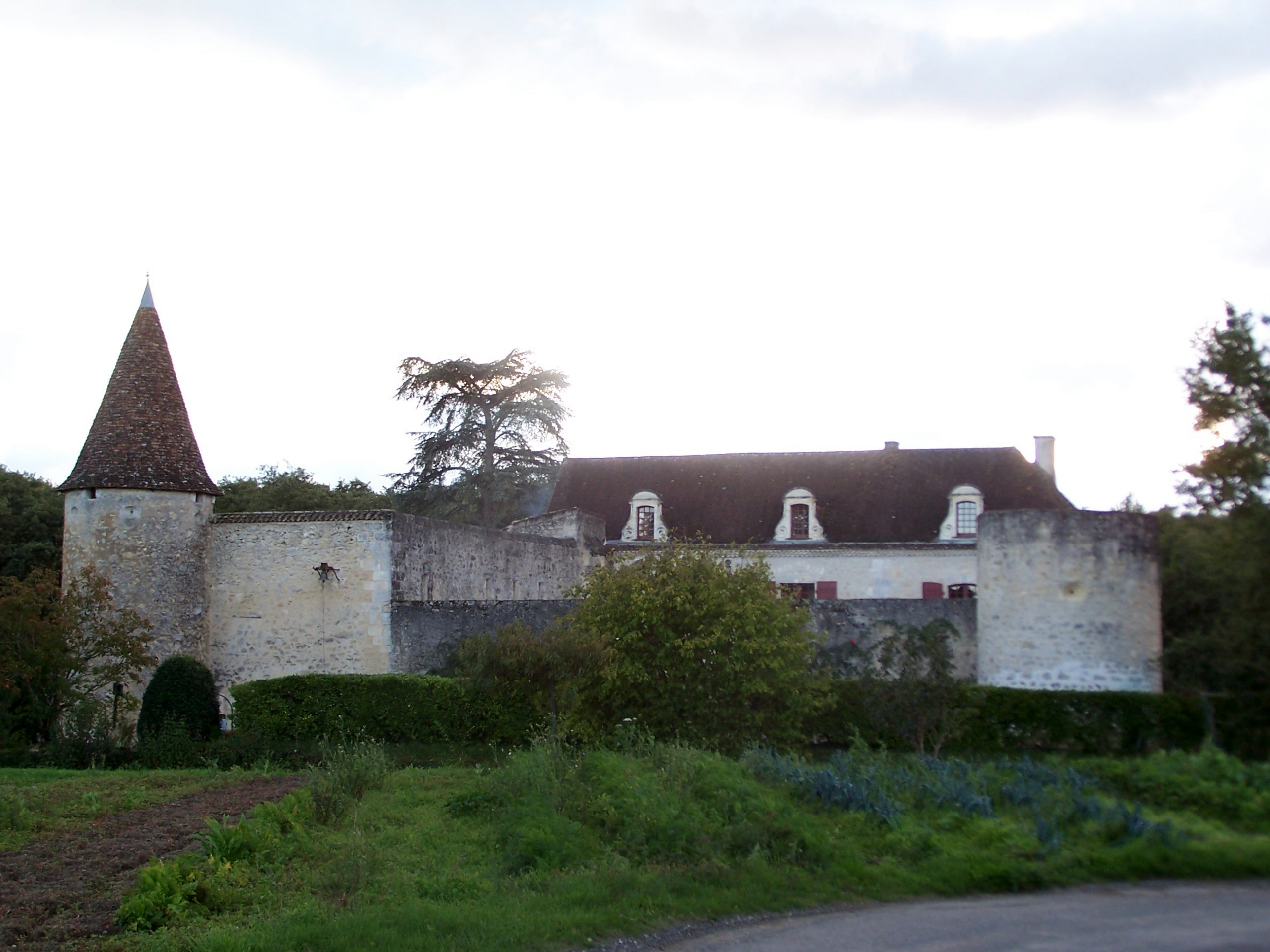
Arpaillan Castle

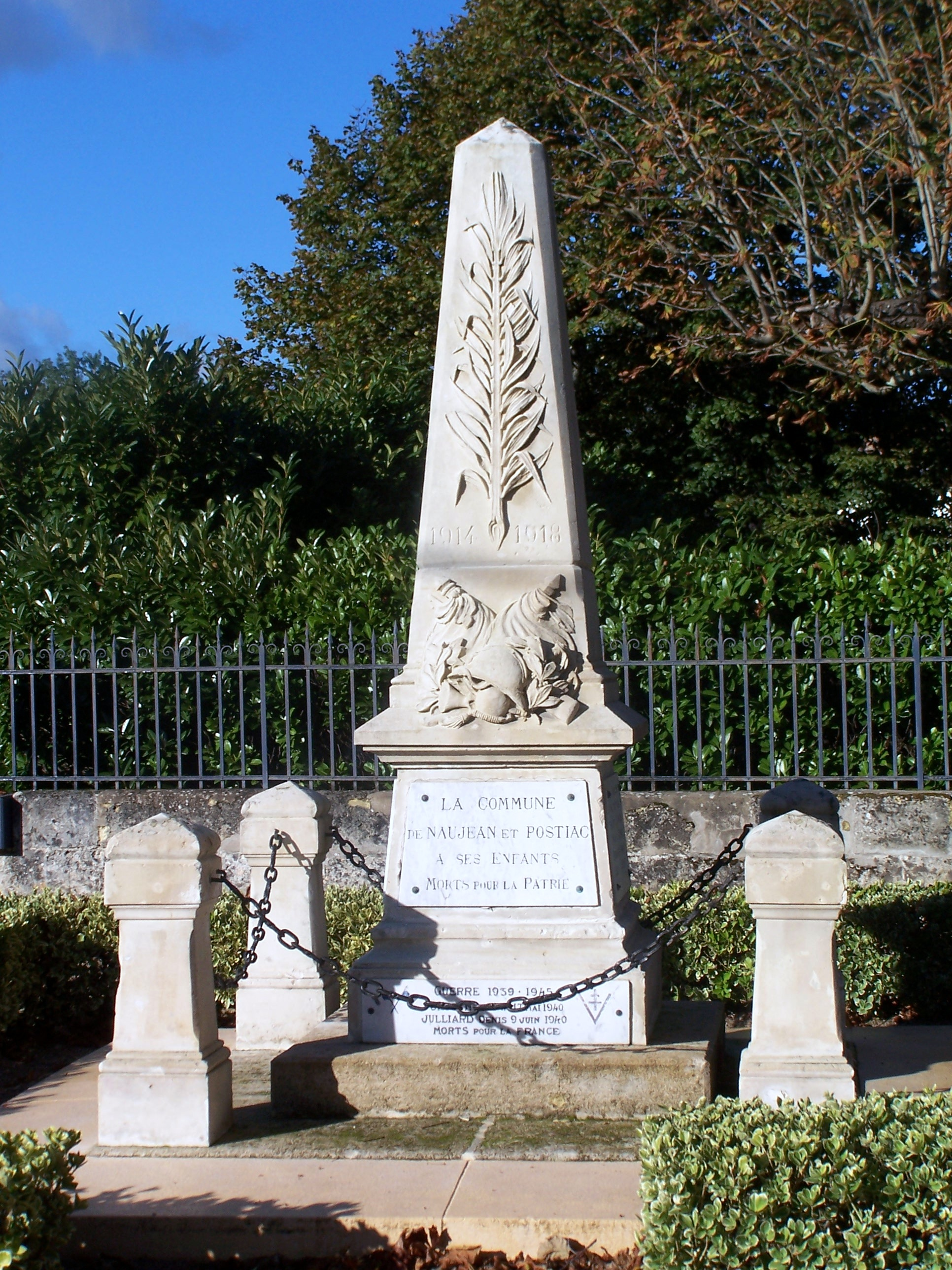
The war memorial near Saint-Pierre church

== Population and society ==
=== Demographics ===
The inhabitants are called Naujanais in French.

Historical population

Year	Pop.	±% p.a.
1793	627	—
1821	682	+0.30%
1846	628	−0.33%
1872	669	+0.24%
1901	564	−0.59%
1926	579	+0.11%
1946	529	−0.45%
1962	553	+0.28%
1968	500	−1.67%

Year	Pop.	±% p.a.
1975	435	−1.97%
1982	423	−0.40%
1990	520	+2.61%
1999	500	−0.43%
2007	498	−0.05%
2012	534	+1.41%
2017	580	+1.67%
2023	599	+0.54%

Source: EHESS and INSEE (1968-2023)

=== Cultural events and festivities ===
Local festival on the last weekend of July.

== Heraldry ==
The coat of arms was presented on the commune's website.

Arms of Naujan-et-Postiac	The arms of Naujan-et-Postiac are blazoned: "Quartered per saltire: first gules a bell or, second azure a mill wheel argent issuant from a river of six wavy fillets sable decreasing towards the base in an inverted chevron, third azure a portcullised tower argent masoned sable, fourth sable a vine stock leaved or, fruited with three bunches of grapes gules, twisted on its stake also or."

== See also ==
- Communes of the Gironde department
