= Bellefond =

Bellefond may refer to the following places in France:

- Bellefond, Côte-d'Or, a commune in the department of Côte-d'Or
- Bellefond, Gironde, a commune in the department of Gironde
