= Guillac =

Guillac may refer to:

- Guillac, Gironde, Gironde department, Nouvelle-Aquitaine, France
- Guillac, Morbihan, Morbihan department, Brittany, France
