= Saint-Aubin-de-Branne =

- Commune
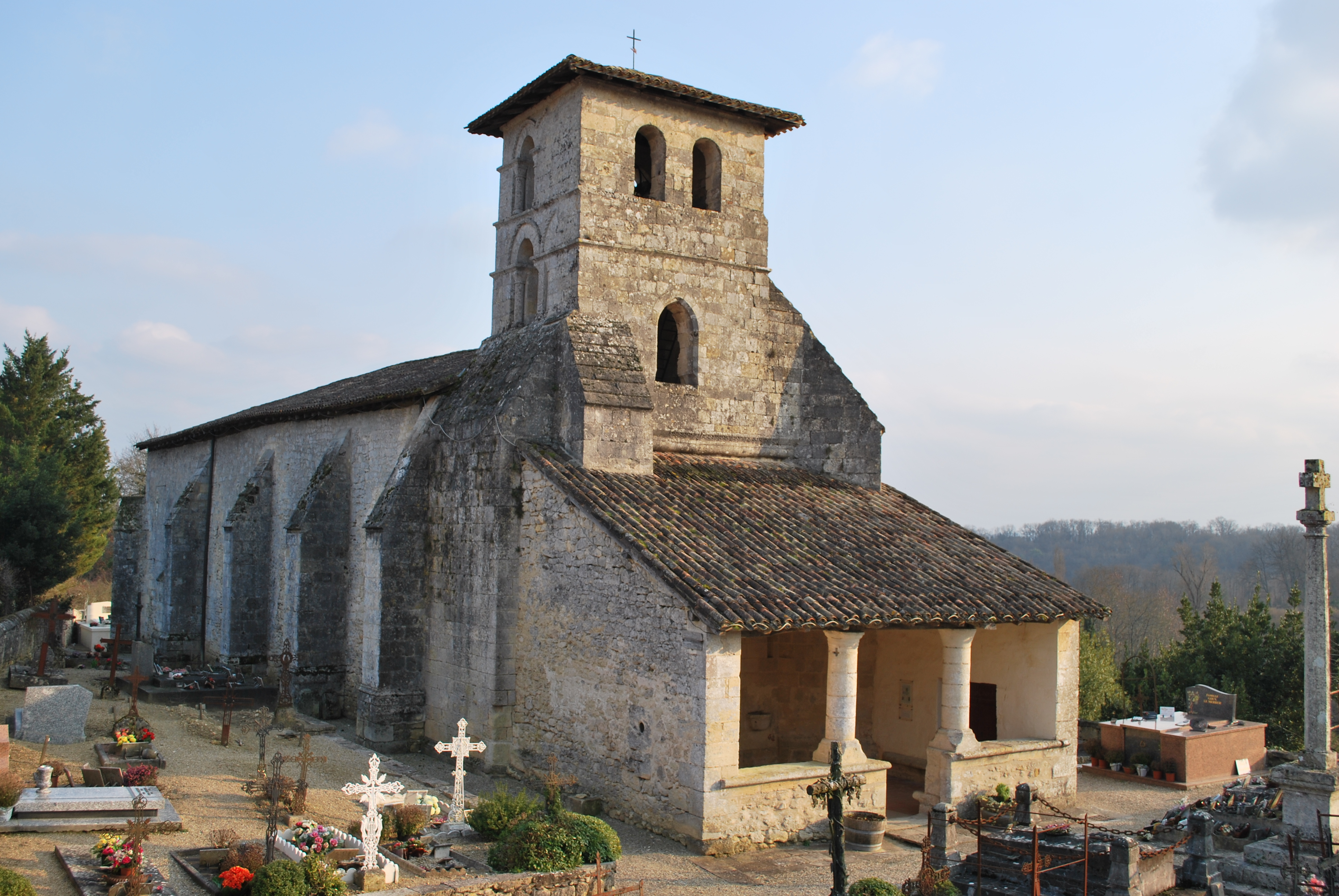
- The church in Saint-Aubin-de-Branne
- Location of Saint-Aubin-de-Branne
- Location within France Location within Nouvelle-Aquitaine
- Coordinates: 44°48′33″N 0°10′14″W
- Country: France
- Region: Nouvelle-Aquitaine
- Department: Gironde
- Arrondissement: Libourne
- Canton: Les Coteaux de Dordogne

Government
  - Mayor (2020–2026): Pascal Labro
- Area^{1}: 5.52 km^{2} (2.13 sq mi)
- Elevation: 50 m (160 ft)
- Highest elevation: 88 m (289 ft)
- Lowest elevation: 2 m (6.6 ft)
- Population (2023): 381
  - Density: 69.0/km^{2} (179/sq mi)
- Time zone: UTC+01:00 (CET)
  - Summer (DST): UTC+02:00 (CEST)
- INSEE/Postal code: 33375 /33420
- ^{1} French Land Register data, which excludes lakes, ponds, glaciers > 1 km^{2} (0.386 sq mi or 247 acres) and river estuaries.

Saint-Aubin-de-Branne (French pronunciation: [sɛ̃.t‿obɛ̃ də bʁan], literally Saint-Aubin of Branne; Occitan: Sent Aubin de Brana) is a commune in the Gironde department in Nouvelle-Aquitaine in southwestern France.

== Population ==
Historical population
Year	Pop.	±% p.a.
1968	228	—
1975	222	−0.38%
1982	251	+1.77%
1990	278	+1.29%
1999	282	+0.16%
2007	365	+3.28%
2012	359	−0.33%
2017	351	−0.45%
2023	381	+1.38%
Source: INSEE

== See also ==
- Communes of the Gironde department
