= Guillac, Gironde =

Guillac
- Commune
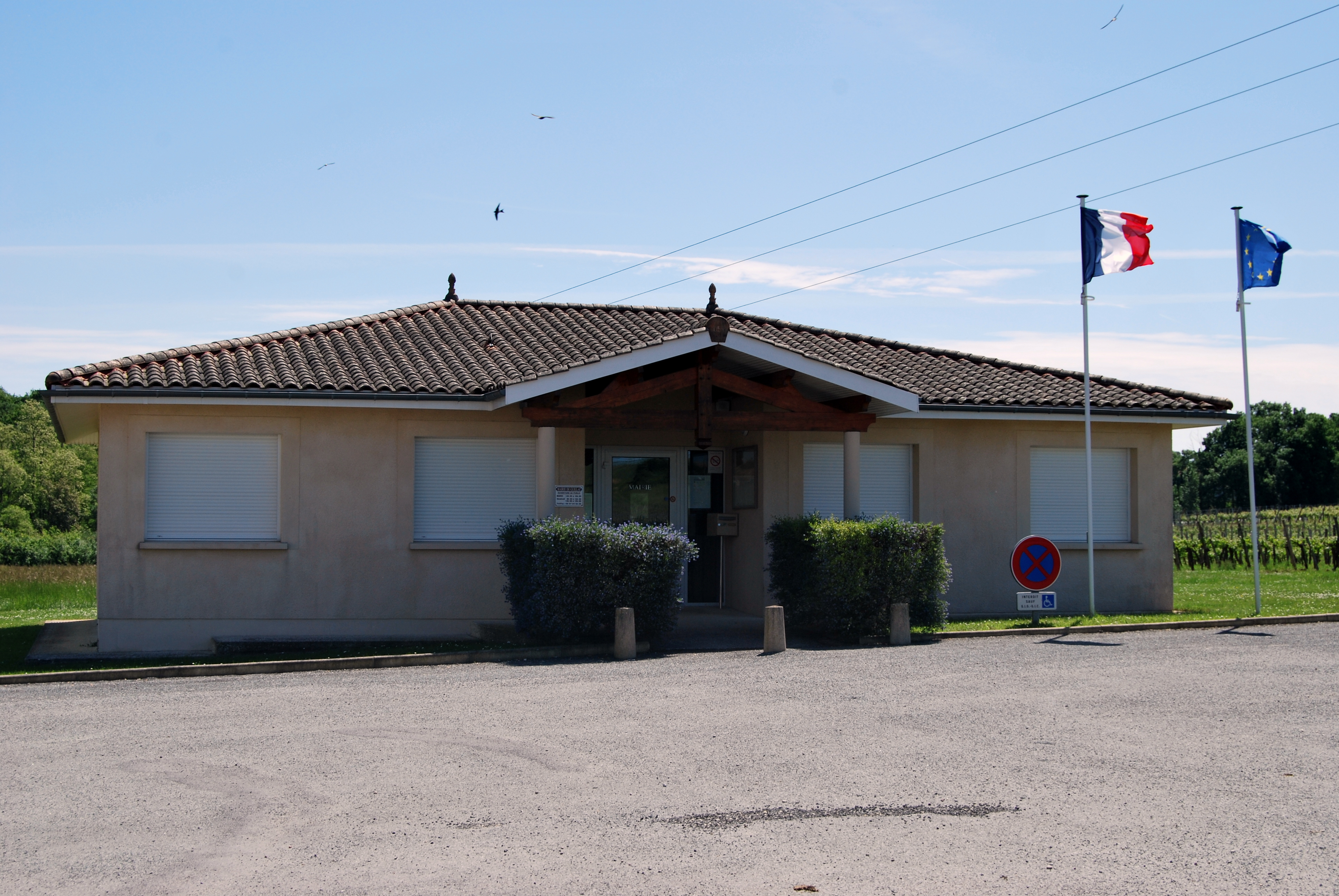
- The town hall in Guillac

- Coat of arms
- Location of Guillac
- Location within France Location within Nouvelle-Aquitaine
- Coordinates: 44°48′07″N 0°12′43″W
- Country: France
- Region: Nouvelle-Aquitaine
- Department: Gironde
- Arrondissement: Libourne
- Canton: Les Coteaux de Dordogne

Government
  - Mayor (2020–2026): Jacky Fromentier
- Area^{1}: 3.06 km^{2} (1.18 sq mi)
- Elevation: 75 m (246 ft)
- Highest elevation: 87 m (285 ft)
- Lowest elevation: 25 m (82 ft)
- Population (2023): 181
  - Density: 59.2/km^{2} (153/sq mi)
- Time zone: UTC+01:00 (CET)
  - Summer (DST): UTC+02:00 (CEST)
- INSEE/Postal code: 33196 /33420
- ^{1} French Land Register data, which excludes lakes, ponds, glaciers > 1 km^{2} (0.386 sq mi or 247 acres) and river estuaries.

Guillac (French pronunciation: [ɡijak]; Occitan: Guilhac) is a commune in the Gironde department in southwestern France.

It is 32 km east of Bordeaux, 13 km north east of Creon and 5 km south west of Branne and the river Dordogne.

St Seurin's church, named after the early Bishop of Bordeaux, was originally part of the Grande-Sauve Abbey.

The part-14th-century chateau Rebullide is one of a number of local vineyards.

== Population ==
Historical population
| Year | Pop. | ±% p.a. |
|---|---|---|
| 1968 | 207 | — |
| 1975 | 167 | −3.02% |
| 1982 | 154 | −1.15% |
| 1990 | 150 | −0.33% |
| 1999 | 157 | +0.51% |
| 2007 | 183 | +1.93% |
| 2012 | 178 | −0.55% |
| 2017 | 163 | −1.75% |
| 2023 | 181 | +1.76% |
Source: INSEE

== See also ==
- Communes of the Gironde department
