= Romagne, Gironde =

Romagne
- Commune
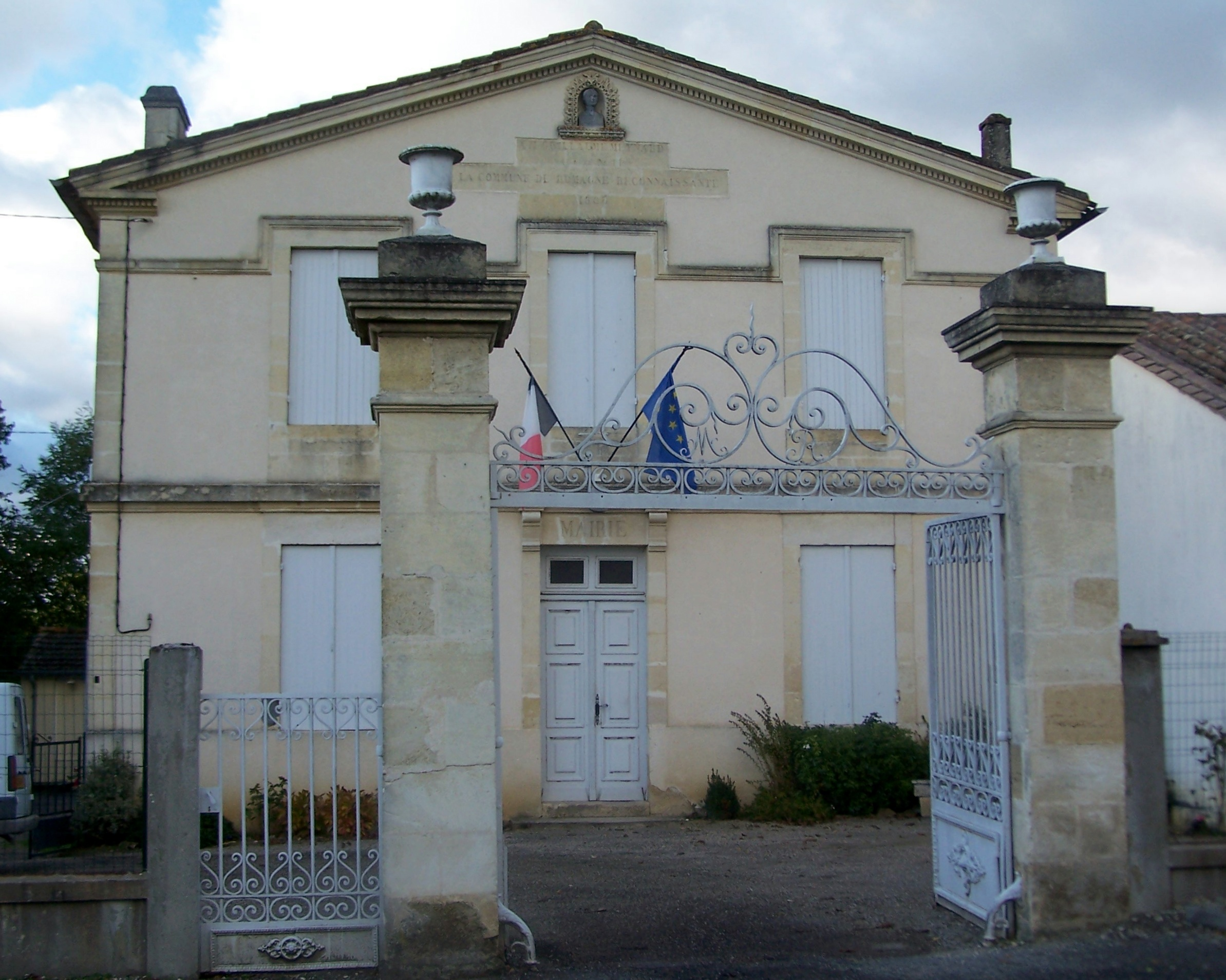
- Town hall
- Location of Romagne
- Location within France Location within Nouvelle-Aquitaine
- Coordinates: 44°45′39″N 0°11′45″W
- Country: France
- Region: Nouvelle-Aquitaine
- Department: Gironde
- Arrondissement: Langon
- Canton: L'Entre-Deux-Mers

Government
  - Mayor (2020–2026): Daniel Gaud
- Area^{1}: 5.15 km^{2} (1.99 sq mi)
- Elevation: 52 m (171 ft)
- Highest elevation: 87 m (285 ft)
- Lowest elevation: 20 m (66 ft)
- Population (2023): 483
  - Density: 93.8/km^{2} (243/sq mi)
- Time zone: UTC+01:00 (CET)
  - Summer (DST): UTC+02:00 (CEST)
- INSEE/Postal code: 33358 /33760
- ^{1} French Land Register data, which excludes lakes, ponds, glaciers > 1 km^{2} (0.386 sq mi or 247 acres) and river estuaries.

Romagne (French pronunciation: [ʁɔmaɲ]; Occitan: Romanha) is a commune in the Gironde department in Nouvelle-Aquitaine in southwestern France.

== Population ==
Historical population
Year	Pop.	±% p.a.
1968	243	—
1975	229	−0.84%
1982	267	+2.22%
1990	262	−0.24%
1999	277	+0.62%
2007	332	+2.29%
2012	456	+6.55%
2017	460	+0.17%
2023	483	+0.82%
Source: INSEE

== See also ==
- Communes of the Gironde department
