= Jugazan =

- Commune
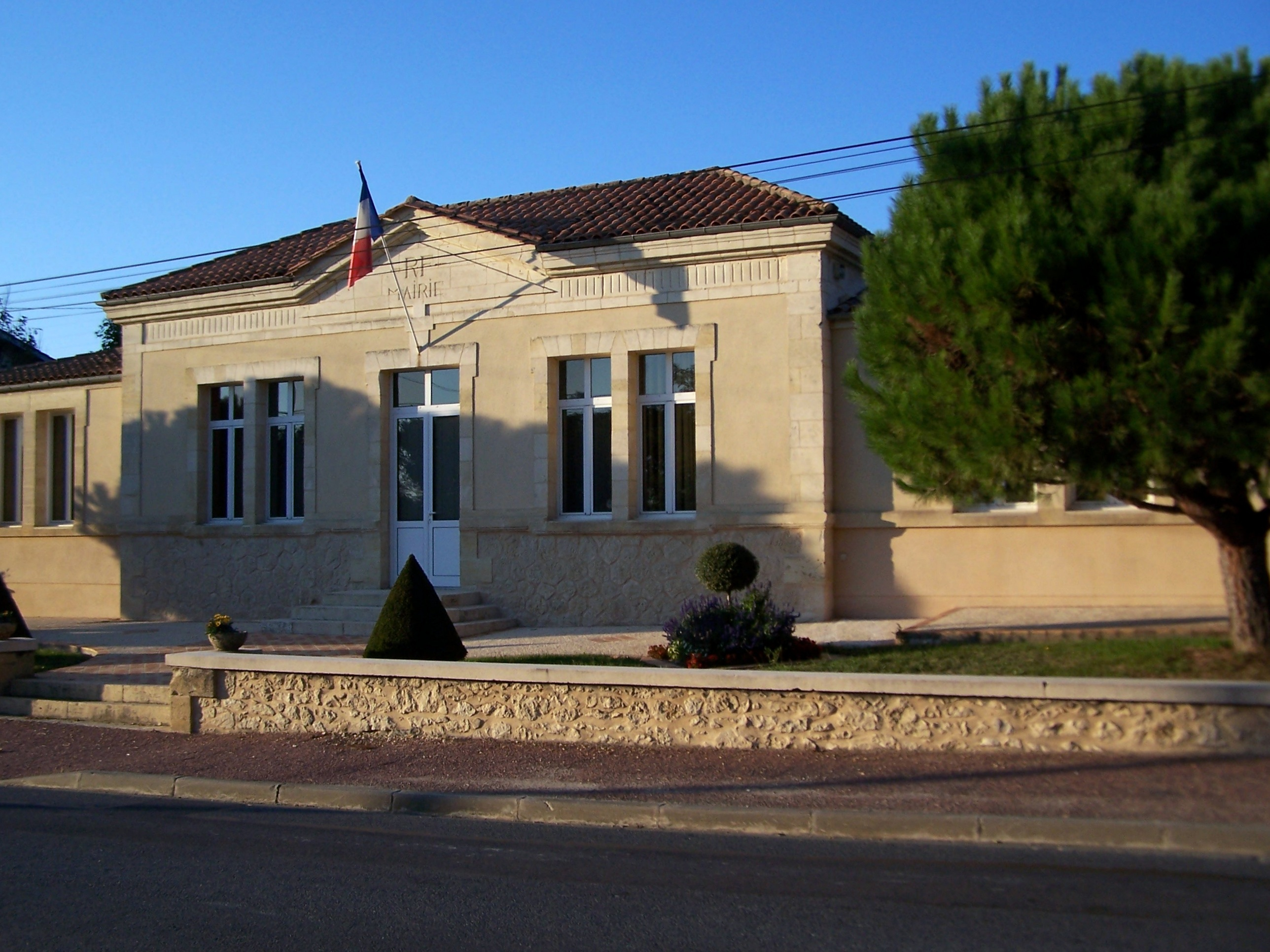
- Town hall
- Location of Jugazan
- Location within France Location within Nouvelle-Aquitaine
- Coordinates: 44°46′57″N 0°09′13″W
- Country: France
- Region: Nouvelle-Aquitaine
- Department: Gironde
- Arrondissement: Libourne
- Canton: Les Coteaux de Dordogne

Government
  - Mayor (2020–2026): François Falgueyret
- Area^{1}: 5.53 km^{2} (2.14 sq mi)
- Elevation: 50 m (160 ft)
- Highest elevation: 98 m (322 ft)
- Lowest elevation: 8 m (26 ft)
- Population (2023): 272
  - Density: 49.2/km^{2} (127/sq mi)
- Time zone: UTC+01:00 (CET)
  - Summer (DST): UTC+02:00 (CEST)
- INSEE/Postal code: 33209 /33420
- ^{1} French Land Register data, which excludes lakes, ponds, glaciers > 1 km^{2} (0.386 sq mi or 247 acres) and river estuaries.

Jugazan (French pronunciation: [ʒyɡazɑ̃]; Occitan: Jugasan) is a commune in the Gironde department in Nouvelle-Aquitaine in southwestern France.

== Population ==
Historical population
Year	Pop.	±% p.a.
1968	279	—
1975	238	−2.25%
1982	209	−1.84%
1990	218	+0.53%
1999	219	+0.05%
2007	270	+2.65%
2012	283	+0.94%
2017	298	+1.04%
2023	272	−1.51%
Source: INSEE

== See also ==
- Communes of the Gironde department
