= Bellefond, Gironde =

Bellefond
- Commune
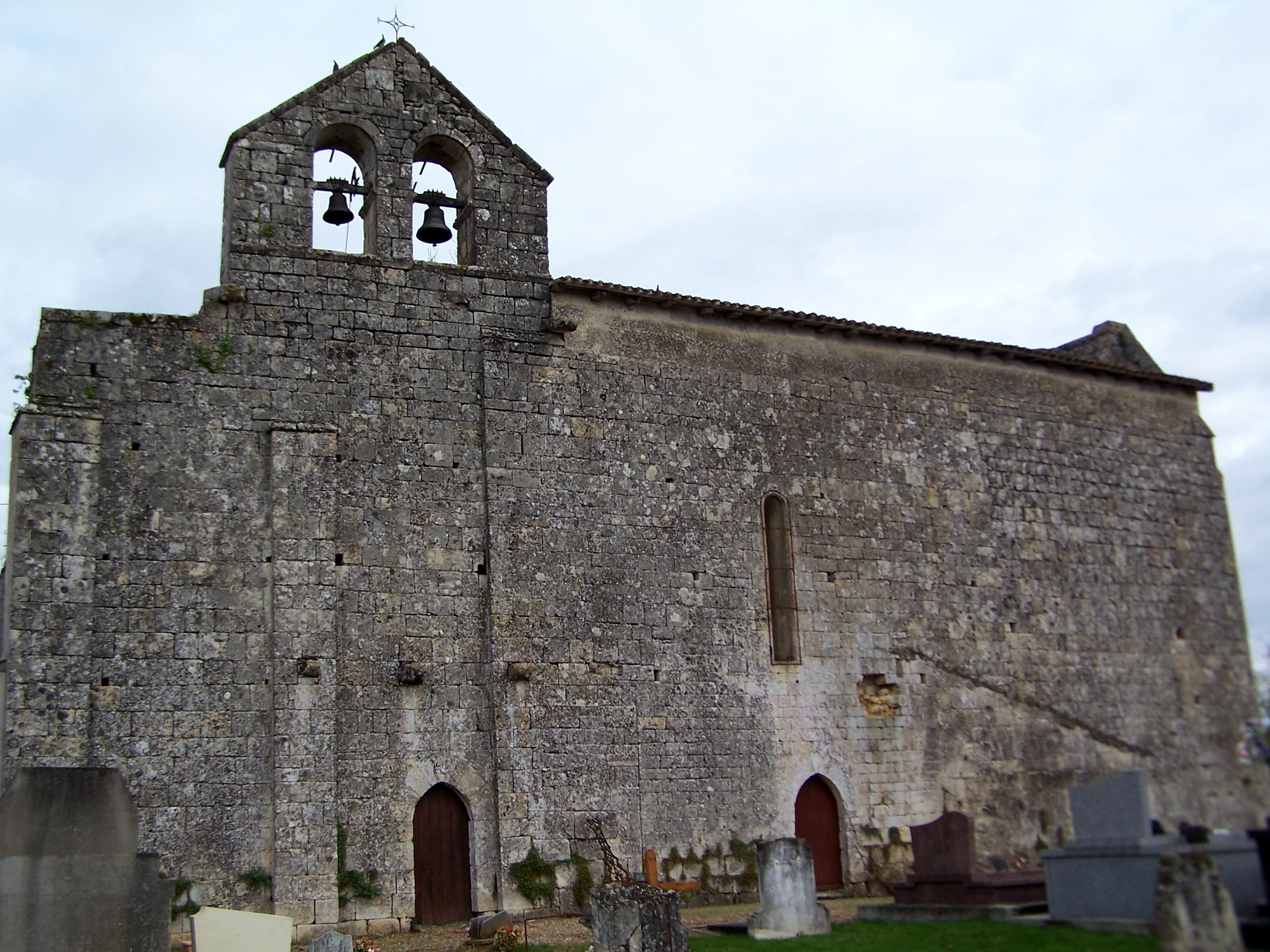
- The church in Bellefond
- Location of Bellefond
- Location within France Location within Nouvelle-Aquitaine
- Coordinates: 44°46′02″N 0°10′10″W
- Country: France
- Region: Nouvelle-Aquitaine
- Department: Gironde
- Arrondissement: Langon
- Canton: L'Entre-Deux-Mers

Government
  - Mayor (2020–2026): Marcel Alonso
- Area^{1}: 3.19 km^{2} (1.23 sq mi)
- Elevation: 80 m (260 ft)
- Highest elevation: 73 m (240 ft)
- Lowest elevation: 12 m (39 ft)
- Population (2023): 213
  - Density: 66.8/km^{2} (173/sq mi)
- Time zone: UTC+01:00 (CET)
  - Summer (DST): UTC+02:00 (CEST)
- INSEE/Postal code: 33044 /33760
- ^{1} French Land Register data, which excludes lakes, ponds, glaciers > 1 km^{2} (0.386 sq mi or 247 acres) and river estuaries.

Bellefond (French pronunciation: [bɛlfɔ̃]; Occitan: Bèlafont) is a commune in the Gironde department in Nouvelle-Aquitaine in southwestern France.

== Population ==
Historical population
Year	Pop.	±% p.a.
1968	161	—
1975	165	+0.35%
1982	164	−0.09%
1990	187	+1.65%
1999	203	+0.92%
2007	230	+1.57%
2012	225	−0.44%
2017	225	+0.00%
2023	213	−0.91%
Source: INSEE

== See also ==
- Communes of the Gironde department
