= Branne, Gironde =

Branne
- Commune
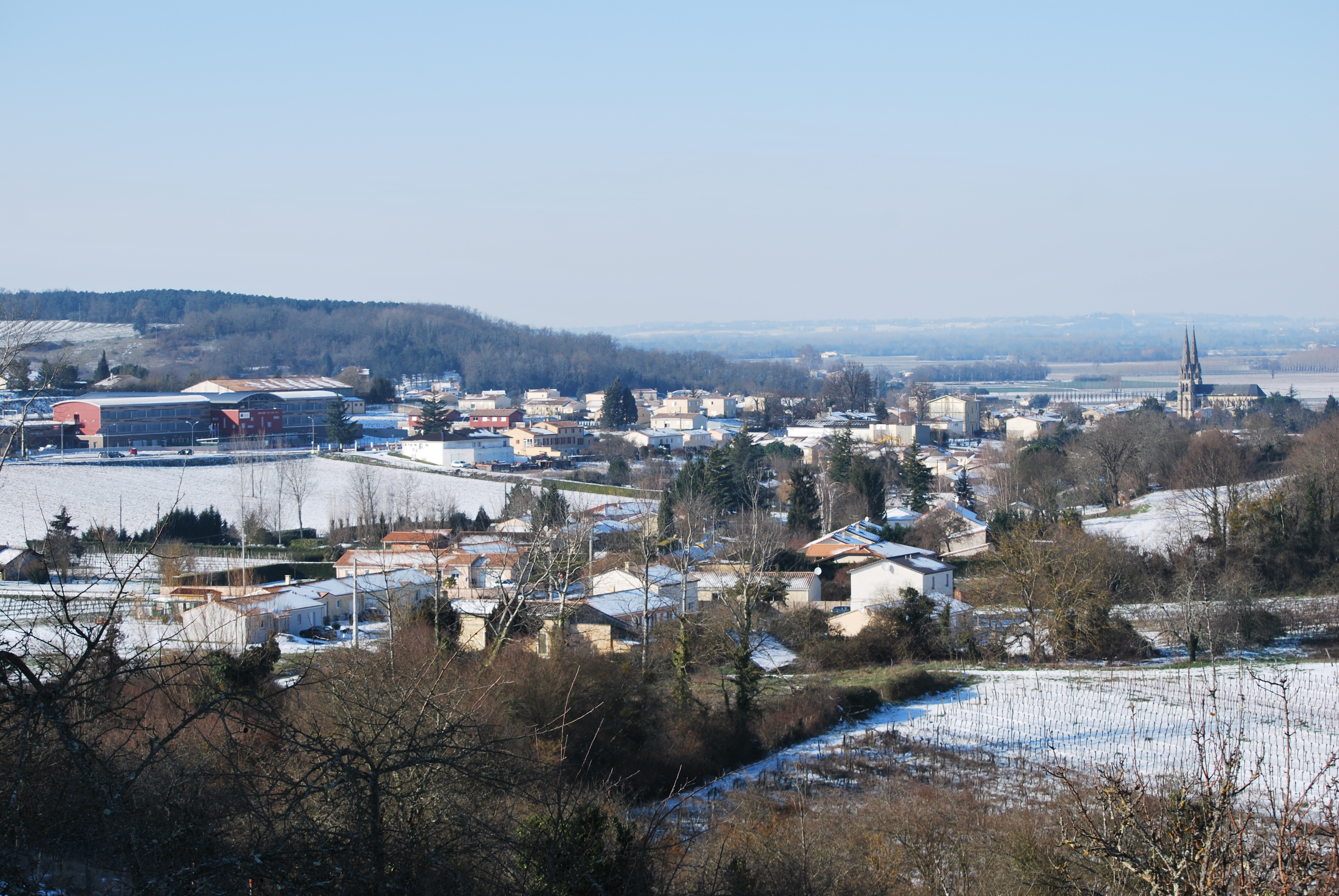
- A general view of Branne

- Coat of arms
- Location of Branne
- Location within France Location within Nouvelle-Aquitaine
- Coordinates: 44°49′53″N 0°11′07″W
- Country: France
- Region: Nouvelle-Aquitaine
- Department: Gironde
- Arrondissement: Libourne
- Canton: Les Coteaux de Dordogne

Government
  - Mayor (2024–2026): Serge Maugey
- Area^{1}: 2.41 km^{2} (0.93 sq mi)
- Elevation: 15 m (49 ft)
- Highest elevation: 81 m (266 ft)
- Lowest elevation: 2 m (6.6 ft)
- Population (2023): 1,296
  - Density: 538/km^{2} (1,390/sq mi)
- Time zone: UTC+01:00 (CET)
  - Summer (DST): UTC+02:00 (CEST)
- INSEE/Postal code: 33071 /33420
- ^{1} French Land Register data, which excludes lakes, ponds, glaciers > 1 km^{2} (0.386 sq mi or 247 acres) and river estuaries.

Branne (French pronunciation: [bʁan]; Occitan: Brana) is a commune in the Gironde department in Nouvelle-Aquitaine in southwestern France.

== Population ==
Historical population
Year	Pop.	±% p.a.
1968	750	—
1975	764	+0.26%
1982	850	+1.54%
1990	875	+0.36%
1999	949	+0.91%
2007	1,172	+2.67%
2012	1,323	+2.45%
2017	1,288	−0.53%
2023	1,296	+0.10%
Source: INSEE

== See also ==
- Communes of the Gironde department
