= Vérac =

- Commune
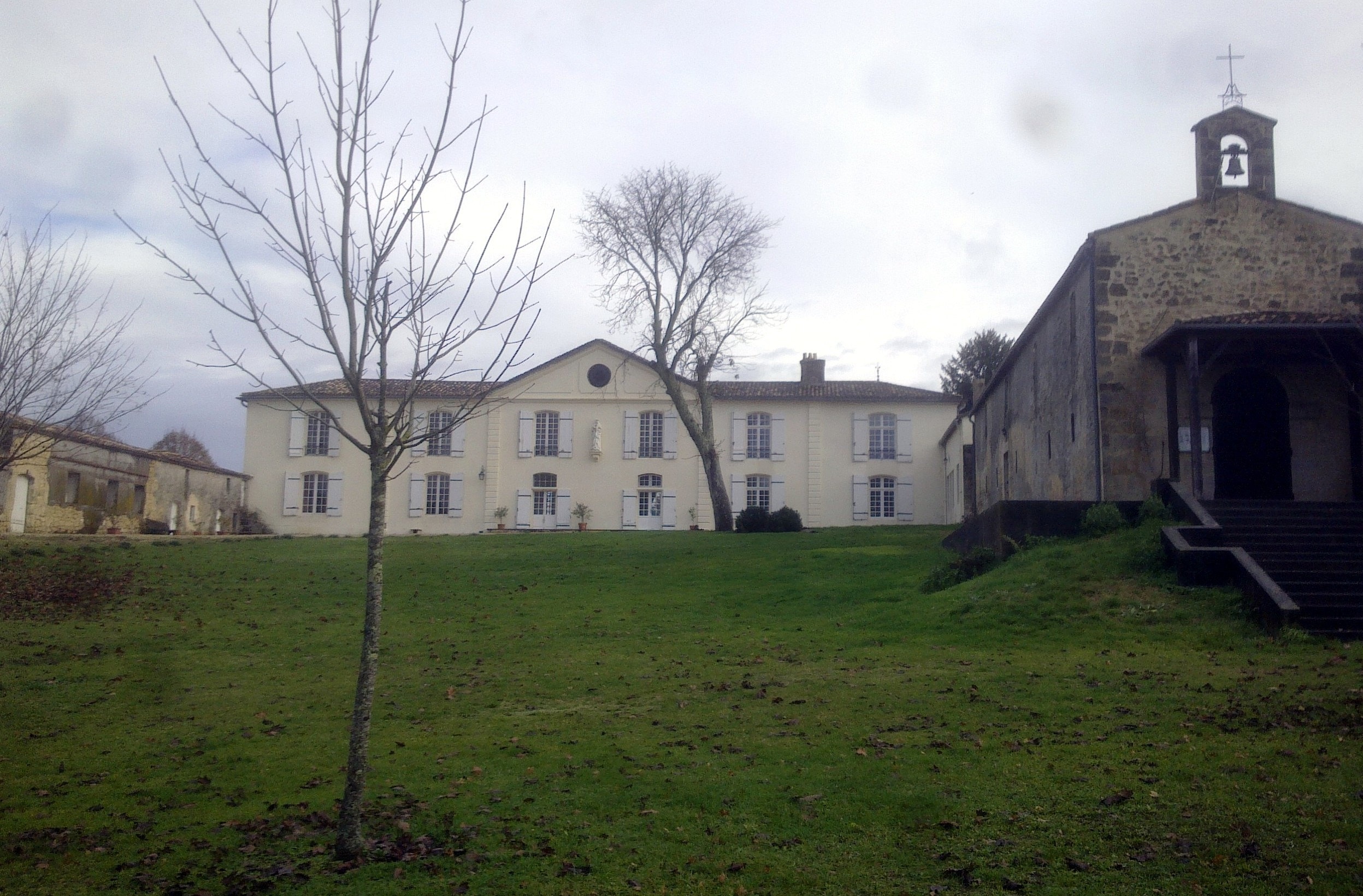
- Château de Pommiers
- Location of Vérac
- Location within France Location within Nouvelle-Aquitaine
- Coordinates: 44°59′32″N 0°20′24″W
- Country: France
- Region: Nouvelle-Aquitaine
- Department: Gironde
- Arrondissement: Libourne
- Canton: Le Libournais-Fronsadais
- Intercommunality: Fronsadais

Government
  - Mayor (2020–2026): Dominique Bec
- Area^{1}: 8.59 km^{2} (3.32 sq mi)
- Elevation: 60 m (200 ft)
- Highest elevation: 69 m (226 ft)
- Lowest elevation: 11 m (36 ft)
- Population (2023): 883
  - Density: 103/km^{2} (266/sq mi)
- Time zone: UTC+01:00 (CET)
  - Summer (DST): UTC+02:00 (CEST)
- INSEE/Postal code: 33542 /33240
- ^{1} French Land Register data, which excludes lakes, ponds, glaciers > 1 km^{2} (0.386 sq mi or 247 acres) and river estuaries.

Vérac (French pronunciation: [veʁak]; Occitan: Vairac) is a commune in the Gironde department in Nouvelle-Aquitaine in southwestern France.

== Population ==
Historical population
Year	Pop.	±% p.a.
1968	550	—
1975	465	−2.37%
1982	581	+3.23%
1990	656	+1.53%
1999	715	+0.96%
2007	785	+1.17%
2012	877	+2.24%
2017	923	+1.03%
2023	883	−0.74%
Source: INSEE

== See also ==
- Communes of the Gironde department
