= Château de Pommiers =

Château in France

Coordinates: 44°59′16″N 0°19′18″W

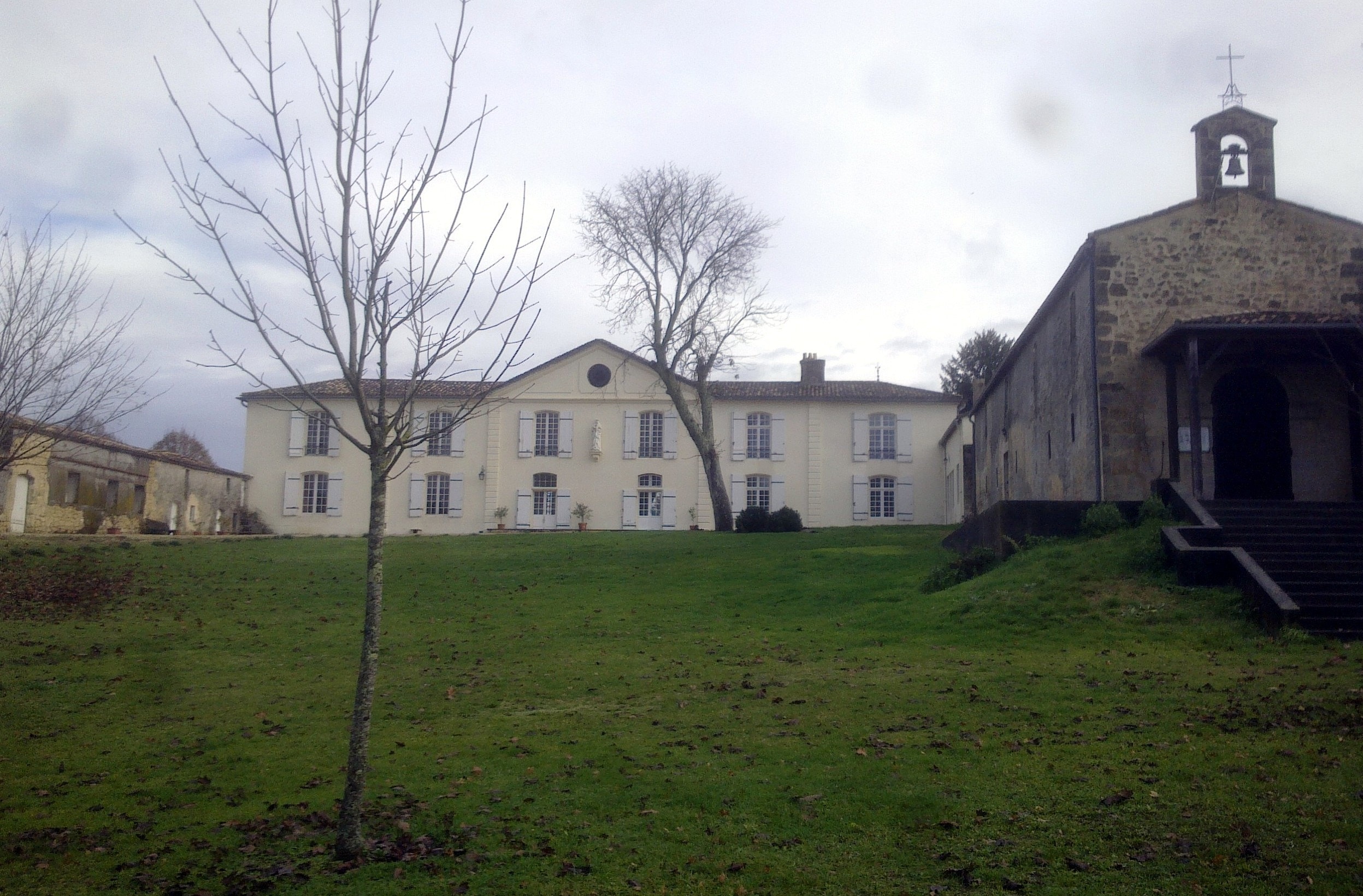
The Castle of Pommiers

The Château de Pommiers is a château in Vérac, Gironde, Nouvelle-Aquitaine, France.
