= Cardan, Gironde =

Cardan
- Commune
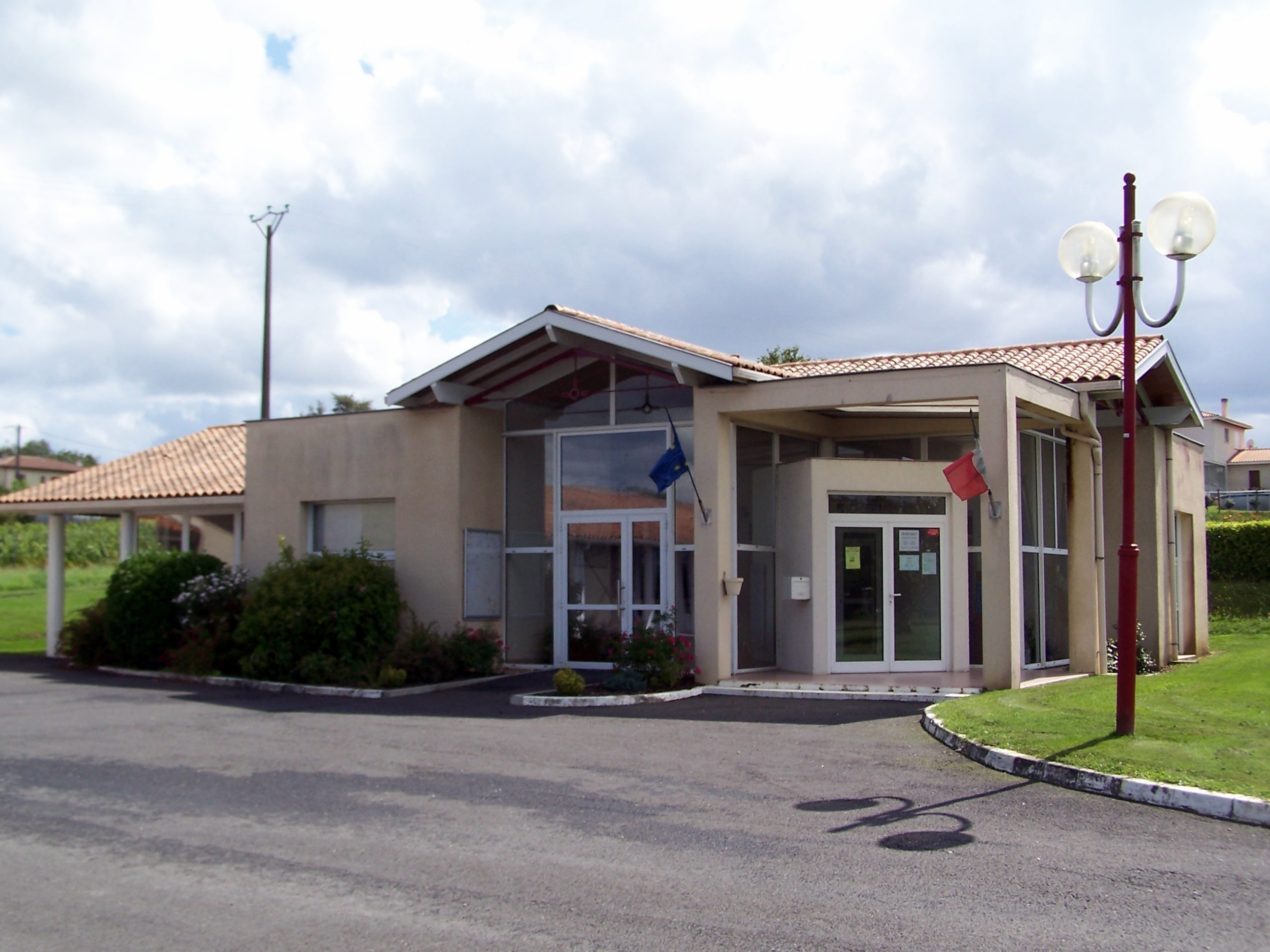
- The town hall in Cardan
- Location of Cardan
- Location within France Location within Nouvelle-Aquitaine
- Coordinates: 44°40′47″N 0°19′02″W
- Country: France
- Region: Nouvelle-Aquitaine
- Department: Gironde
- Arrondissement: Langon
- Canton: L'Entre-Deux-Mers

Government
  - Mayor (2020–2026): Denis Reyne
- Area^{1}: 4.25 km^{2} (1.64 sq mi)
- Elevation: 113 m (371 ft)
- Highest elevation: 117 m (384 ft)
- Lowest elevation: 43 m (141 ft)
- Population (2023): 510
  - Density: 120/km^{2} (310/sq mi)
- Time zone: UTC+01:00 (CET)
  - Summer (DST): UTC+02:00 (CEST)
- INSEE/Postal code: 33098 /33410
- ^{1} French Land Register data, which excludes lakes, ponds, glaciers > 1 km^{2} (0.386 sq mi or 247 acres) and river estuaries.

Cardan (French pronunciation: [kaʁdɑ̃]) is a commune in the Gironde department in Nouvelle-Aquitaine in southwestern France.

== Population ==
Historical population
Year	Pop.	±% p.a.
1968	296	—
1975	285	−0.54%
1982	339	+2.51%
1990	369	+1.07%
1999	373	+0.12%
2007	411	+1.22%
2012	448	+1.74%
2017	498	+2.14%
2023	510	+0.40%
Source: INSEE

== See also ==
- Communes of the Gironde department
