= Escoussans =

- Commune
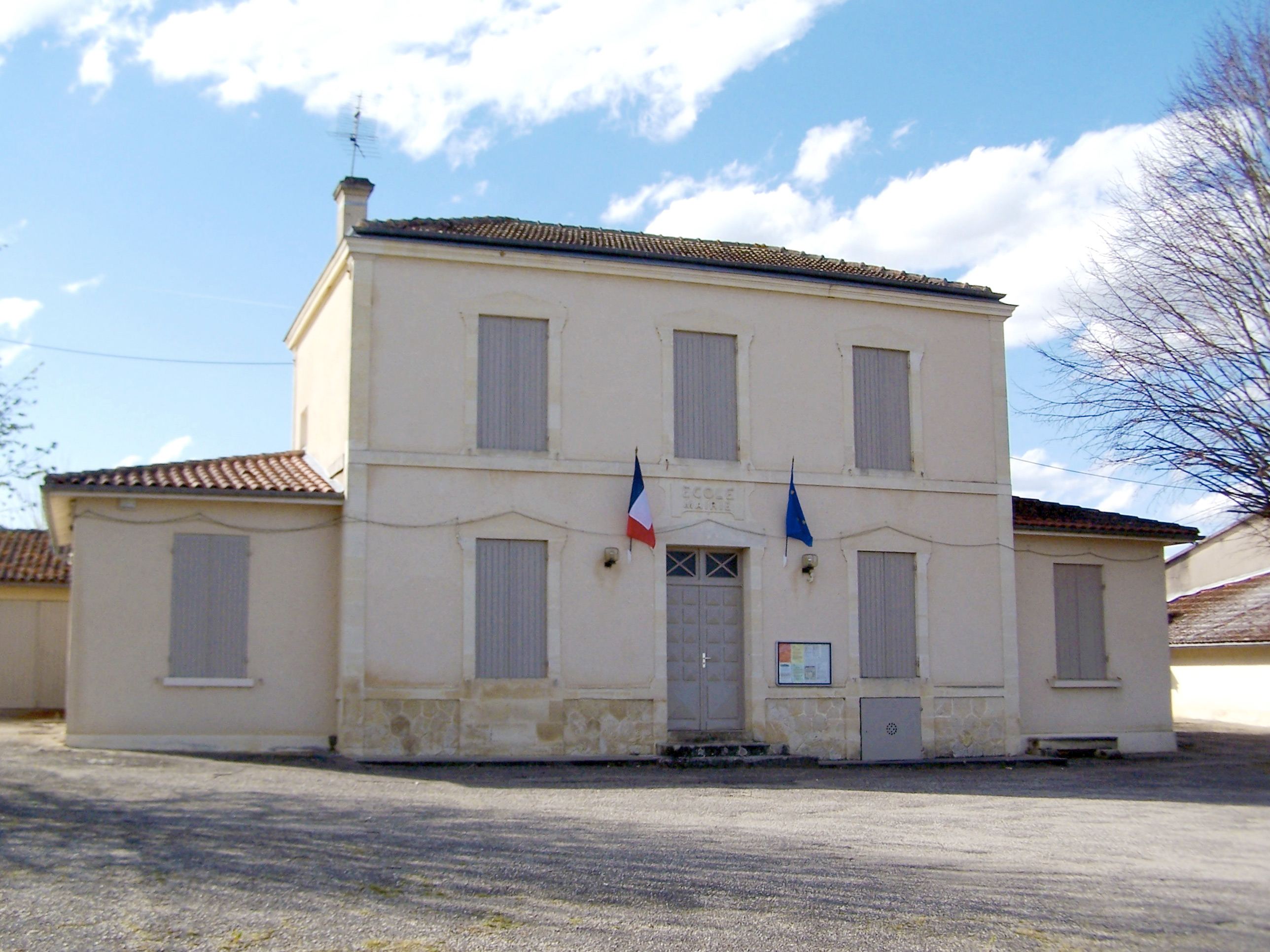
- Town hall

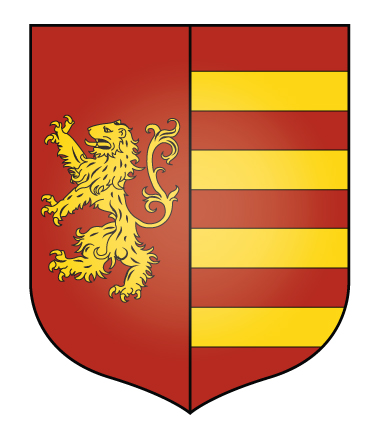
- Coat of arms
- Location of Escoussans
- Location within France Location within Nouvelle-Aquitaine
- Coordinates: 44°41′06″N 0°15′55″W
- Country: France
- Region: Nouvelle-Aquitaine
- Department: Gironde
- Arrondissement: Langon
- Canton: L'Entre-Deux-Mers

Government
  - Mayor (2020–2026): Catherine Bertin
- Area^{1}: 5.11 km^{2} (1.97 sq mi)
- Elevation: 51 m (167 ft)
- Highest elevation: 97 m (318 ft)
- Lowest elevation: 23 m (75 ft)
- Population (2023): 273
  - Density: 53.4/km^{2} (138/sq mi)
- Time zone: UTC+01:00 (CET)
  - Summer (DST): UTC+02:00 (CEST)
- INSEE/Postal code: 33156 /33760
- ^{1} French Land Register data, which excludes lakes, ponds, glaciers > 1 km^{2} (0.386 sq mi or 247 acres) and river estuaries.

Escoussans is a commune in the Gironde department in southwestern France.

== Population ==
Historical population
Year	Pop.	±% p.a.
1968	247	—
1975	243	−0.23%
1982	260	+0.97%
1990	262	+0.10%
1999	244	−0.79%
2007	270	+1.27%
2012	320	+3.46%
2017	299	−1.35%
2023	273	−1.50%
Source: INSEE

== See also ==
- Communes of the Gironde department
