= Ladaux =

- Commune
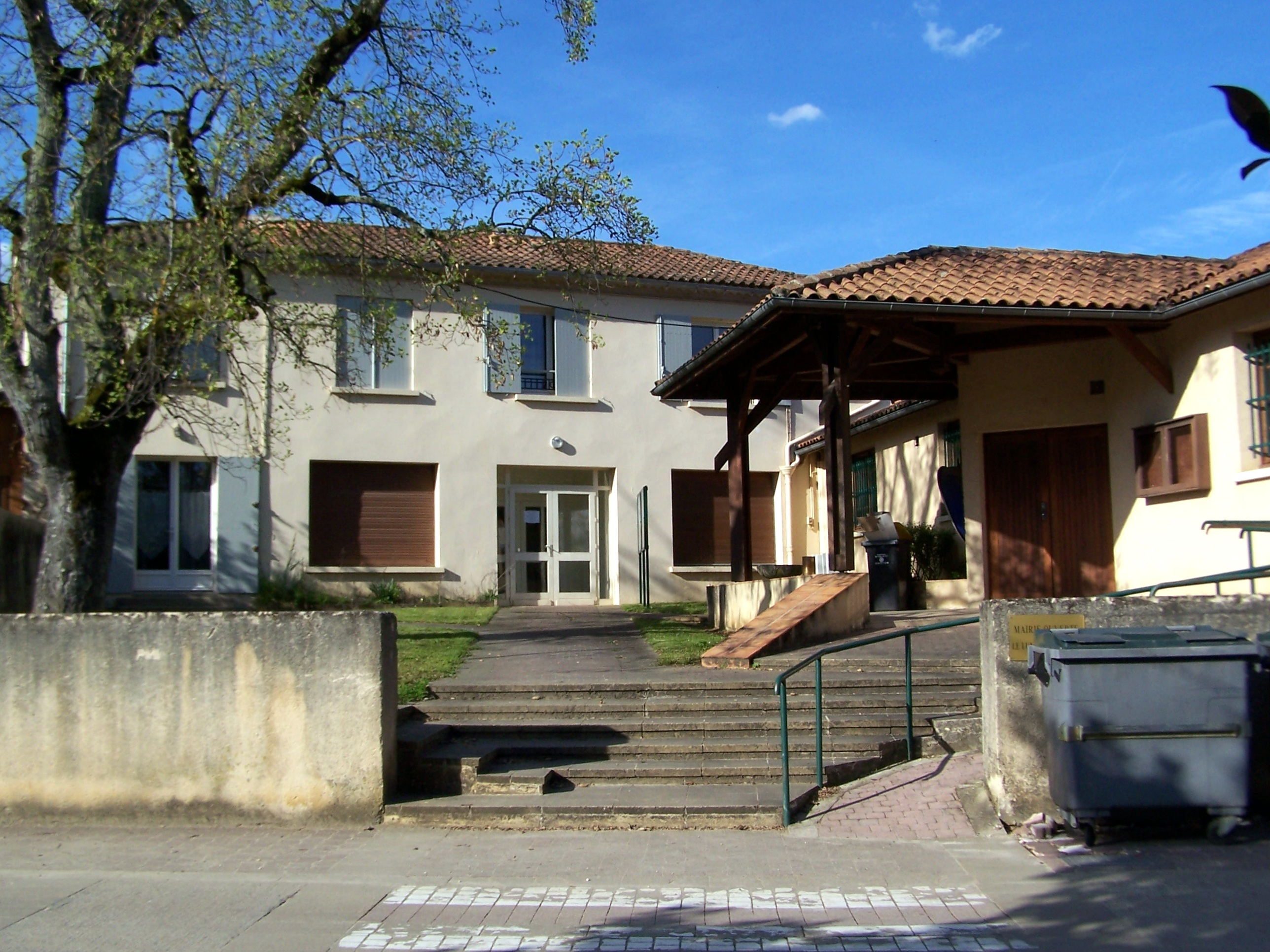
- Town hall
- Location of Ladaux
- Location within France Location within Nouvelle-Aquitaine
- Coordinates: 44°42′06″N 0°14′36″W
- Country: France
- Region: Nouvelle-Aquitaine
- Department: Gironde
- Arrondissement: Langon
- Canton: L'Entre-Deux-Mers

Government
  - Mayor (2020–2026): Christophe Serena
- Area^{1}: 4.29 km^{2} (1.66 sq mi)
- Elevation: 43 m (141 ft)
- Highest elevation: 87 m (285 ft)
- Lowest elevation: 33 m (108 ft)
- Population (2023): 190
  - Density: 44/km^{2} (110/sq mi)
- Time zone: UTC+01:00 (CET)
  - Summer (DST): UTC+02:00 (CEST)
- INSEE/Postal code: 33215 /33760
- ^{1} French Land Register data, which excludes lakes, ponds, glaciers > 1 km^{2} (0.386 sq mi or 247 acres) and river estuaries.

Ladaux is a commune in the Gironde department in Nouvelle-Aquitaine in southwestern France.

== Population ==
Historical population
Year	Pop.	±% p.a.
1968	234	—
1975	200	−2.22%
1982	180	−1.49%
1990	165	−1.08%
1999	186	+1.34%
2007	192	+0.40%
2012	202	+1.02%
2017	195	−0.70%
2023	190	−0.43%
Source: INSEE

== See also ==
- Communes of the Gironde department
