= Le Pian-sur-Garonne =

- Commune
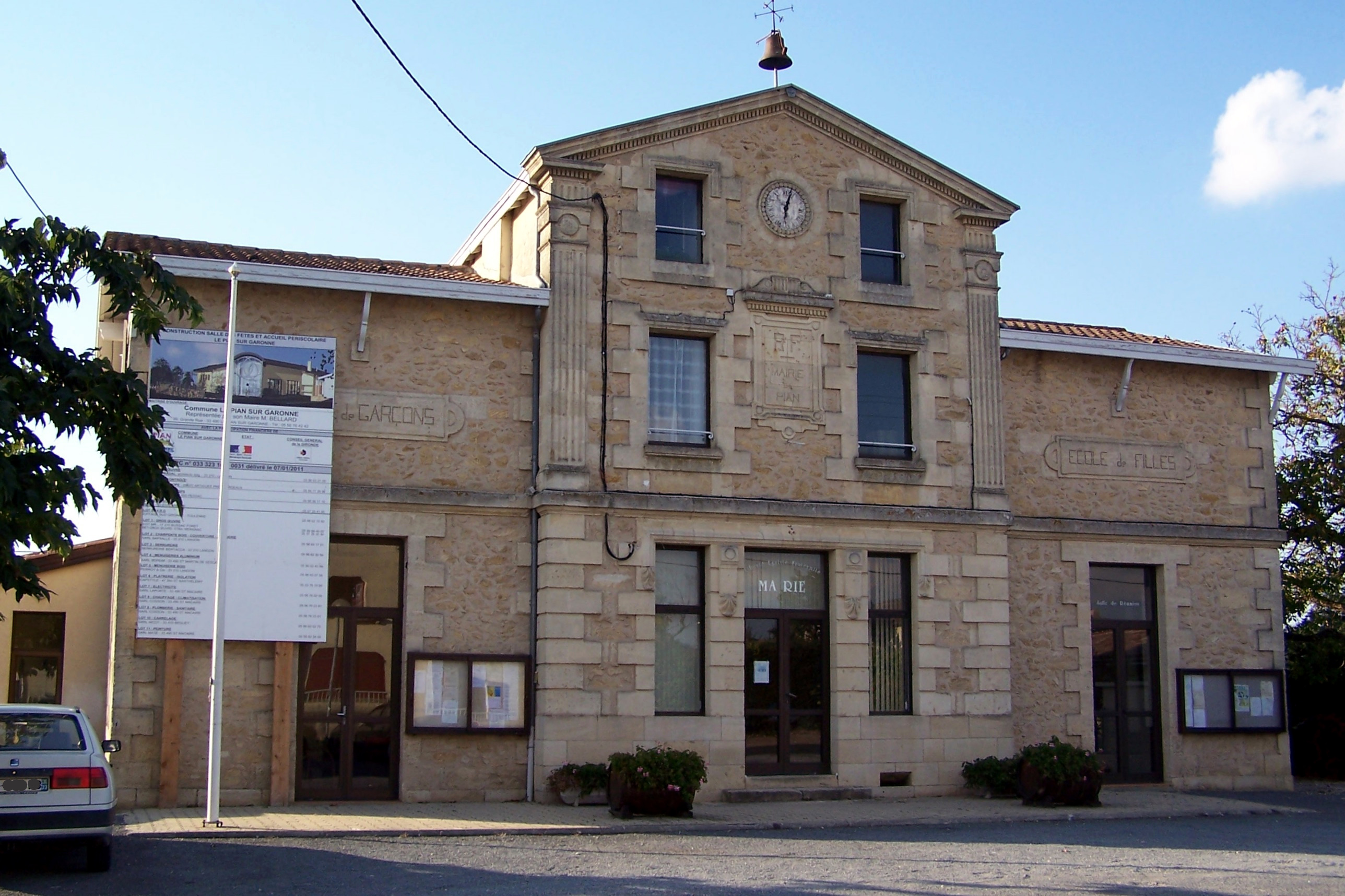
- Town hall
- Location of Le Pian-sur-Garonne
- Location within France Location within Nouvelle-Aquitaine
- Coordinates: 44°35′12″N 0°12′39″W
- Country: France
- Region: Nouvelle-Aquitaine
- Department: Gironde
- Arrondissement: Langon
- Canton: L'Entre-Deux-Mers

Government
  - Mayor (2020–2026): Didier Cousiney
- Area^{1}: 6.35 km^{2} (2.45 sq mi)
- Elevation: 110 m (360 ft)
- Highest elevation: 116 m (381 ft)
- Lowest elevation: 2 m (6.6 ft)
- Population (2023): 981
  - Density: 154/km^{2} (400/sq mi)
- Time zone: UTC+01:00 (CET)
  - Summer (DST): UTC+02:00 (CEST)
- INSEE/Postal code: 33323 /33490
- ^{1} French Land Register data, which excludes lakes, ponds, glaciers > 1 km^{2} (0.386 sq mi or 247 acres) and river estuaries.

Le Pian-sur-Garonne (French pronunciation: [lə pjɑ̃ syʁ ɡaʁɔn], literally Le Pian on Garonne; Occitan: Pian) is a commune in the Gironde department in Nouvelle-Aquitaine in southwestern France.

== Population ==
Historical population
Year	Pop.	±% p.a.
1968	429	—
1975	432	+0.10%
1982	460	+0.90%
1990	517	+1.47%
1999	609	+1.84%
2007	657	+0.95%
2012	835	+4.91%
2017	852	+0.40%
2023	981	+2.38%
Source: INSEE

== See also ==
- Communes of the Gironde department
