= Bellebat =

- Commune
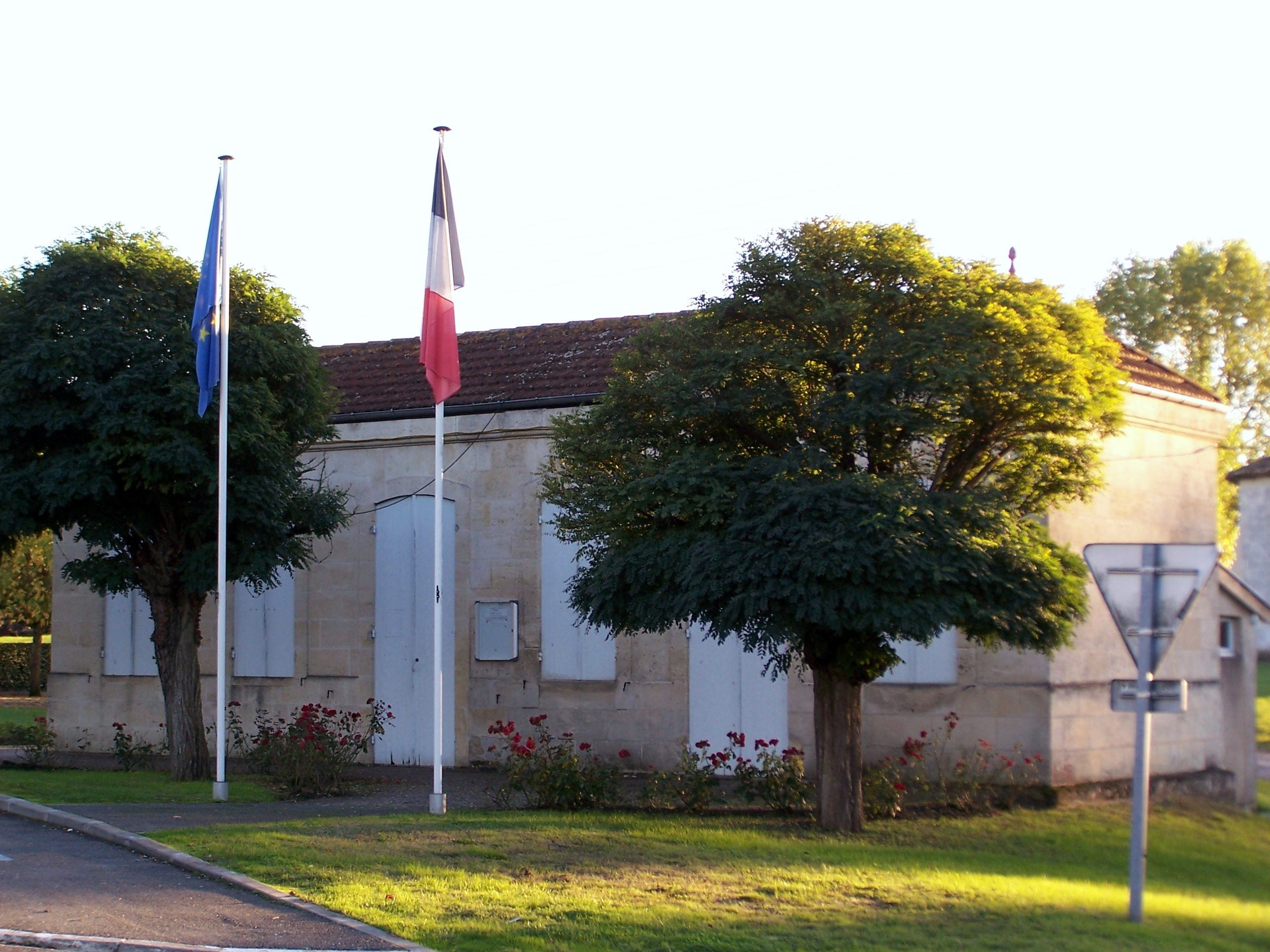
- Town hall
- Location of Bellebat
- Location within France Location within Nouvelle-Aquitaine
- Coordinates: 44°44′24″N 0°12′56″W
- Country: France
- Region: Nouvelle-Aquitaine
- Department: Gironde
- Arrondissement: Langon
- Canton: L'Entre-Deux-Mers

Government
  - Mayor (2020–2026): Alain Leveau
- Area^{1}: 4.87 km^{2} (1.88 sq mi)
- Elevation: 70 m (230 ft)
- Highest elevation: 117 m (384 ft)
- Lowest elevation: 51 m (167 ft)
- Population (2023): 329
  - Density: 67.6/km^{2} (175/sq mi)
- Time zone: UTC+01:00 (CET)
  - Summer (DST): UTC+02:00 (CEST)
- INSEE/Postal code: 33043 /33760
- ^{1} French Land Register data, which excludes lakes, ponds, glaciers > 1 km^{2} (0.386 sq mi or 247 acres) and river estuaries.

Bellebat (French pronunciation: [bɛlba]; Gascon: Bèra Vath) is a commune in the Gironde department in Nouvelle-Aquitaine in southwestern France.

== Population ==
Historical population
Year	Pop.	±% p.a.
1968	98	—
1975	89	−1.37%
1982	122	+4.61%
1990	134	+1.18%
1999	143	+0.72%
2007	217	+5.35%
2012	236	+1.69%
2017	257	+1.72%
2023	329	+4.20%
Source: INSEE

== See also ==
- Communes of the Gironde department
