= Gornac =

- Commune
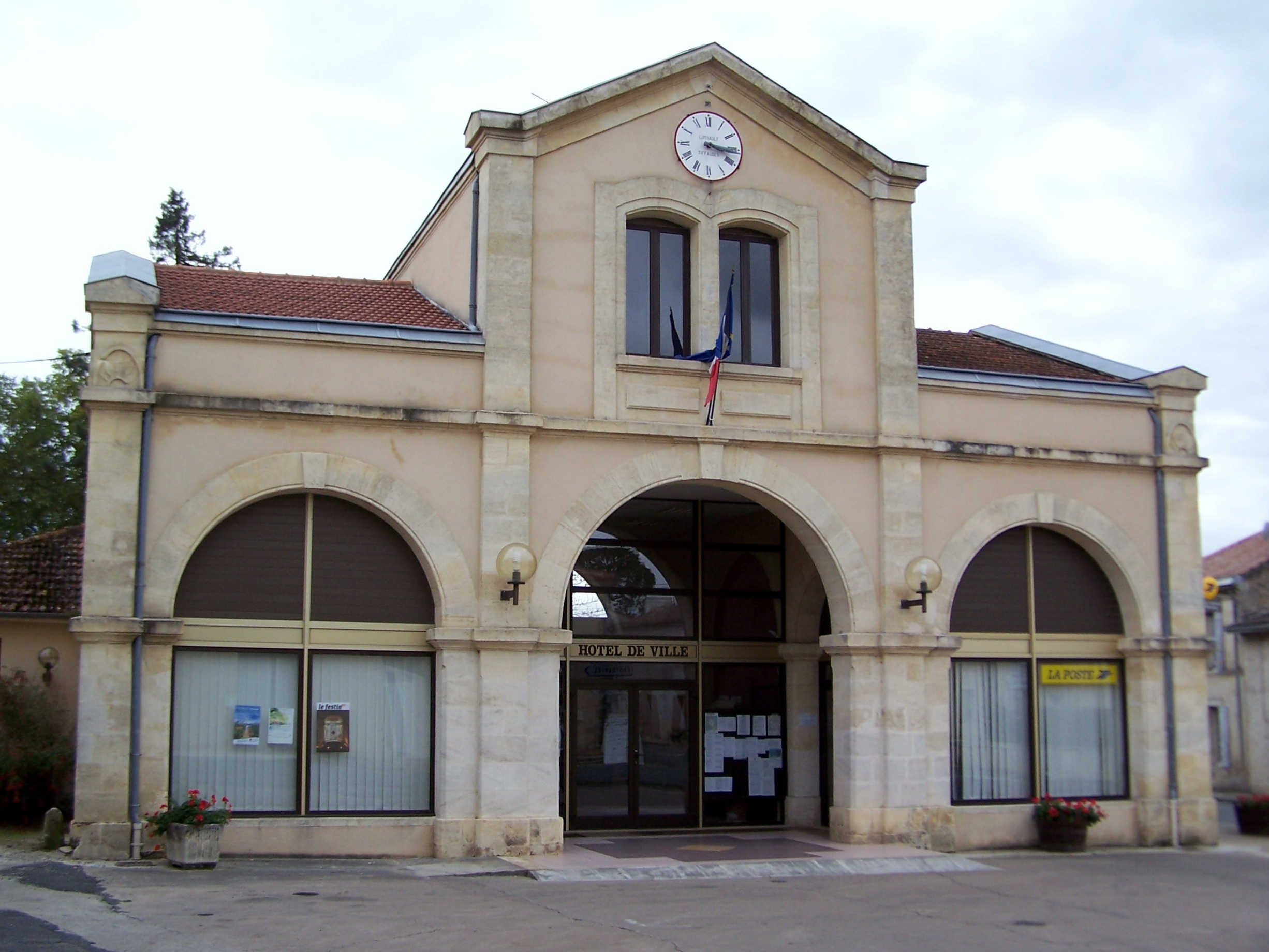
- Town hall
- Location of Gornac
- Location within France Location within Nouvelle-Aquitaine
- Coordinates: 44°39′49″N 0°10′50″W
- Country: France
- Region: Nouvelle-Aquitaine
- Department: Gironde
- Arrondissement: Langon
- Canton: L'Entre-Deux-Mers
- Intercommunality: CC rurales de l'Entre-Deux-Mers

Government
  - Mayor (2022–2026): Laurence Leroy
- Area^{1}: 8.35 km^{2} (3.22 sq mi)
- Elevation: 109 m (358 ft)
- Highest elevation: 113 m (371 ft)
- Lowest elevation: 54 m (177 ft)
- Population (2023): 441
  - Density: 52.8/km^{2} (137/sq mi)
- Time zone: UTC+01:00 (CET)
  - Summer (DST): UTC+02:00 (CEST)
- INSEE/Postal code: 33189 /33540
- Website: www.gornac.com
- ^{1} French Land Register data, which excludes lakes, ponds, glaciers > 1 km^{2} (0.386 sq mi or 247 acres) and river estuaries.

Gornac (French pronunciation: [ɡɔʁnak]) is a commune in the Gironde department in southwestern France.

== Population ==
Historical population
Year	Pop.	±% p.a.
1968	414	—
1975	418	+0.14%
1982	364	−1.96%
1990	358	−0.21%
1999	368	+0.31%
2007	368	+0.00%
2012	390	+1.17%
2017	435	+2.21%
2023	441	+0.23%
Source: INSEE

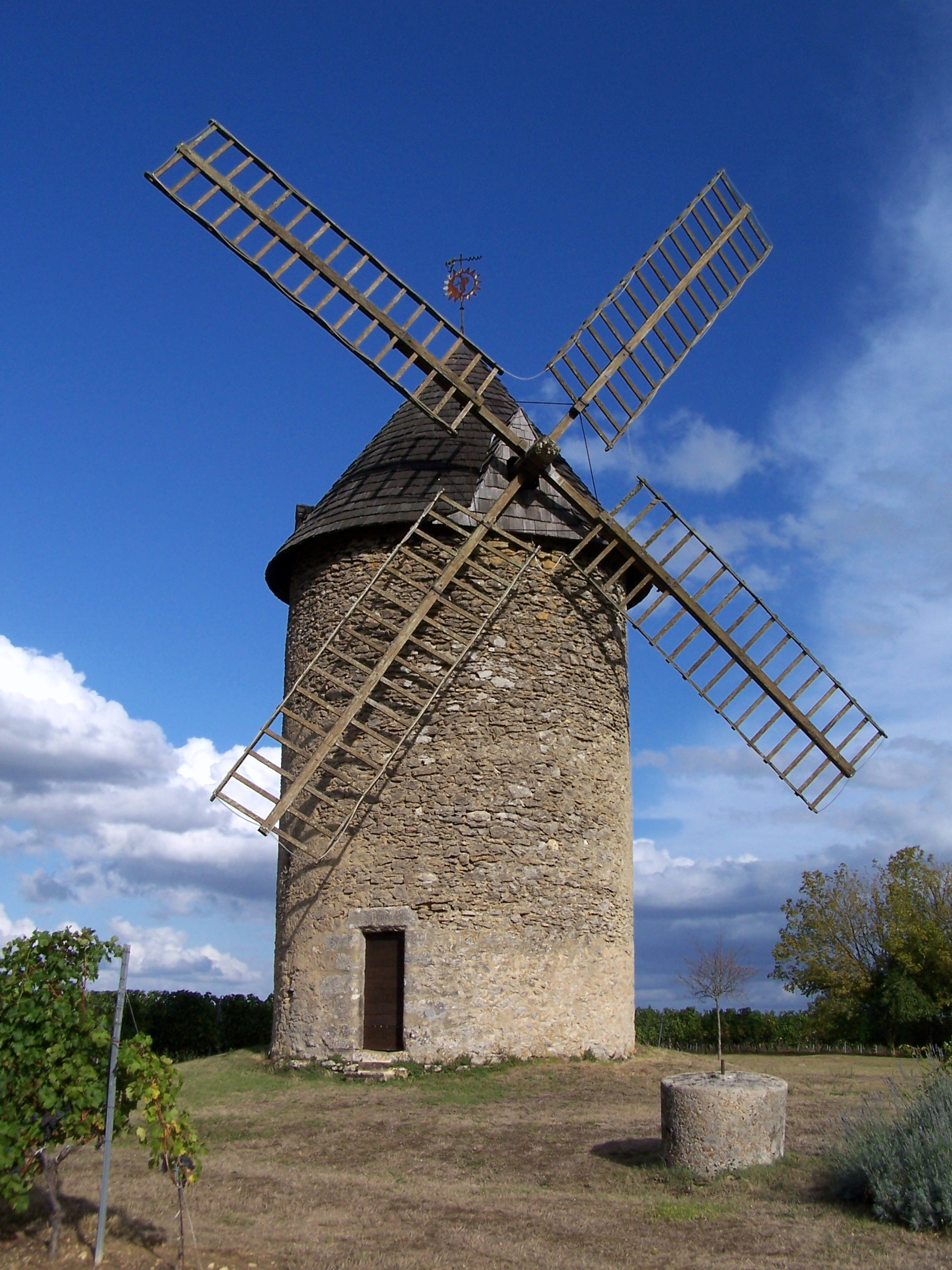
Moulin de Haut-Benauge (1601)

== See also ==
- Communes of the Gironde department
