= Lestiac-sur-Garonne =

- Commune
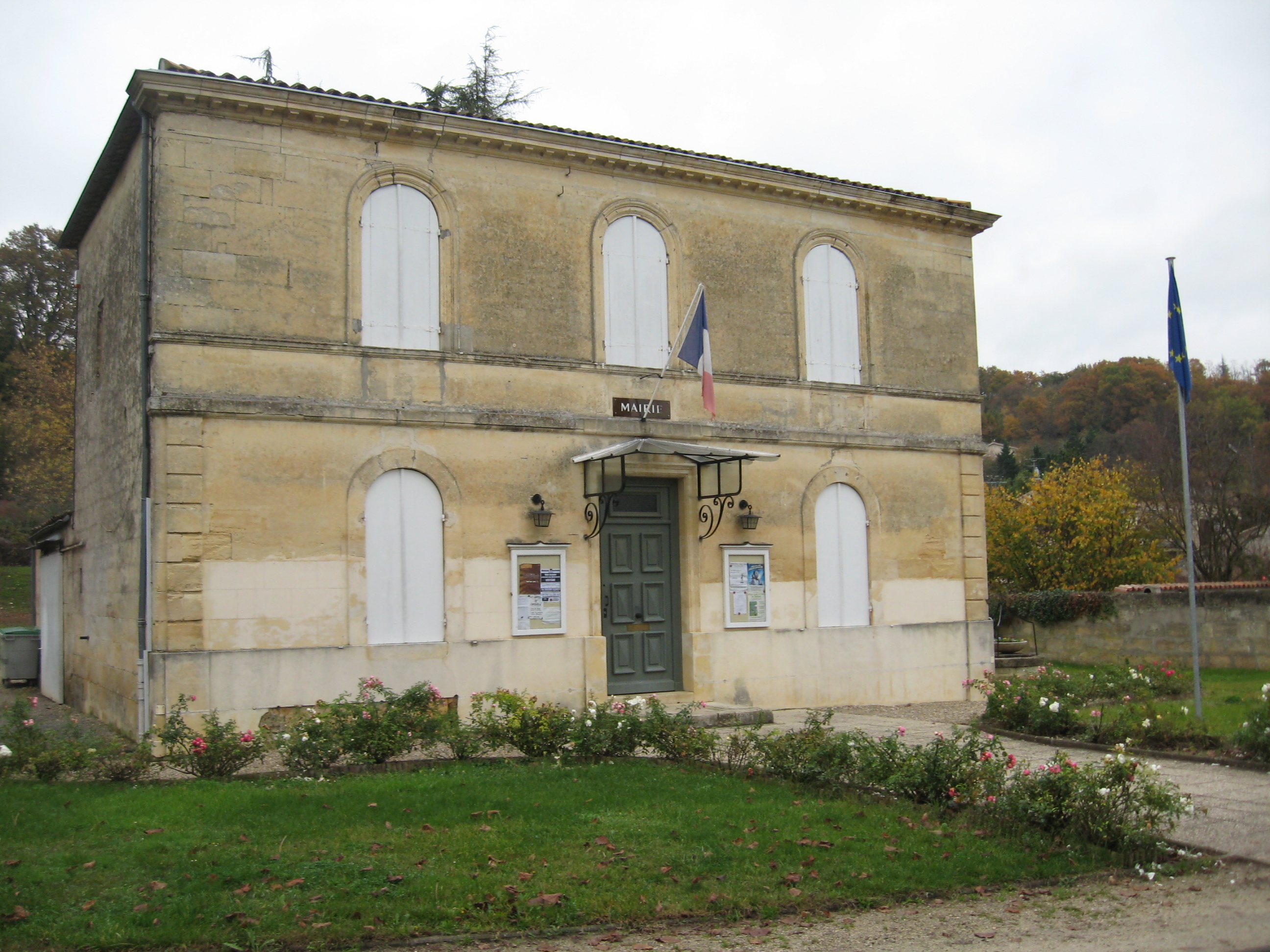
- Town hall

- Coat of arms
- Location of Lestiac-sur-Garonne
- Location within France Location within Nouvelle-Aquitaine
- Coordinates: 44°41′38″N 0°22′23″W
- Country: France
- Region: Nouvelle-Aquitaine
- Department: Gironde
- Arrondissement: Langon
- Canton: L'Entre-Deux-Mers
- Intercommunality: Convergence Garonne

Government
  - Mayor (2020–2026): Daniel Bouchet
- Area^{1}: 2.98 km^{2} (1.15 sq mi)
- Elevation: 12 m (39 ft)
- Highest elevation: 96 m (315 ft)
- Lowest elevation: 3 m (9.8 ft)
- Population (2023): 585
  - Density: 196/km^{2} (508/sq mi)
- Time zone: UTC+01:00 (CET)
  - Summer (DST): UTC+02:00 (CEST)
- INSEE/Postal code: 33241 /33550
- ^{1} French Land Register data, which excludes lakes, ponds, glaciers > 1 km^{2} (0.386 sq mi or 247 acres) and river estuaries.

Lestiac-sur-Garonne (French pronunciation: [lɛstjak syʁ ɡaʁɔn], literally Lestiac on Garonne; Occitan: Lestiac) is a commune in the Gironde department in Nouvelle-Aquitaine in southwestern France.

== Population ==
Historical population
Year	Pop.	±% p.a.
1968	553	—
1975	545	−0.21%
1982	577	+0.82%
1990	594	+0.36%
1999	586	−0.15%
2007	647	+1.25%
2012	590	−1.83%
2017	580	−0.34%
2023	585	+0.14%
Source: INSEE

== See also ==
- Communes of the Gironde department
