= Laroque, Gironde =

Laroque
- Commune
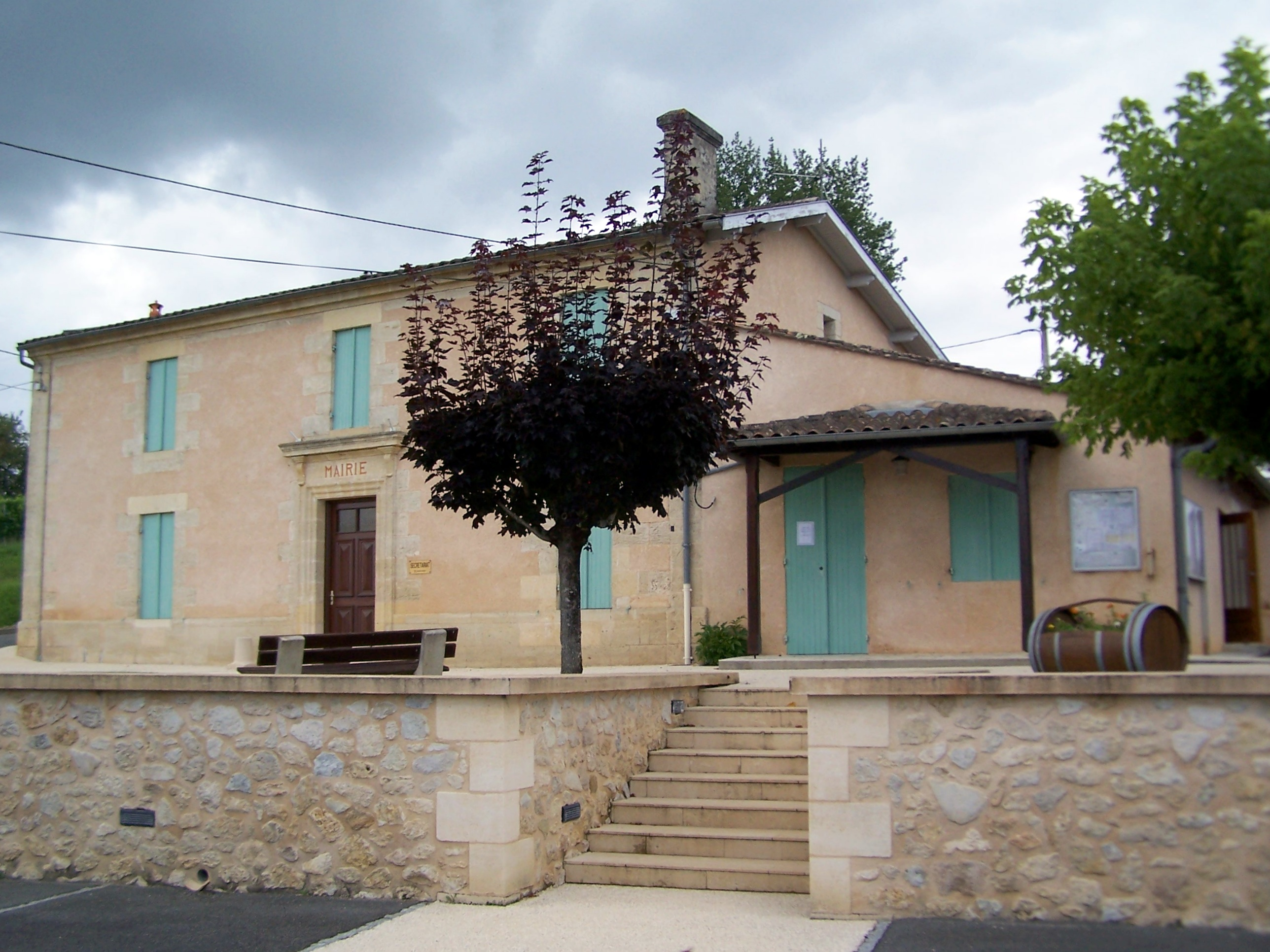
- The town hall in Laroque
- Location of Laroque
- Location within France Location within Nouvelle-Aquitaine
- Coordinates: 44°39′38″N 0°18′12″W
- Country: France
- Region: Nouvelle-Aquitaine
- Department: Gironde
- Arrondissement: Langon
- Canton: L'Entre-Deux-Mers

Government
  - Mayor (2020–2026): René Gavello
- Area^{1}: 2.97 km^{2} (1.15 sq mi)
- Elevation: 50 m (160 ft)
- Highest elevation: 107 m (351 ft)
- Lowest elevation: 13 m (43 ft)
- Population (2023): 285
  - Density: 96.0/km^{2} (249/sq mi)
- Time zone: UTC+01:00 (CET)
  - Summer (DST): UTC+02:00 (CEST)
- INSEE/Postal code: 33231 /33410
- ^{1} French Land Register data, which excludes lakes, ponds, glaciers > 1 km^{2} (0.386 sq mi or 247 acres) and river estuaries.

Laroque (French pronunciation: [laʁɔk]; Occitan: La Ròca) is a commune in the Gironde department in Nouvelle-Aquitaine in southwestern France.

== Population ==
Historical population
Year	Pop.	±% p.a.
1968	342	—
1975	336	−0.25%
1982	266	−3.28%
1990	253	−0.62%
1999	230	−1.05%
2007	255	+1.30%
2012	275	+1.52%
2017	279	+0.29%
2023	285	+0.36%
Source: INSEE

== See also ==
- Communes of the Gironde department
