= Saint-Martial, Gironde =

Saint-Martial
- Commune
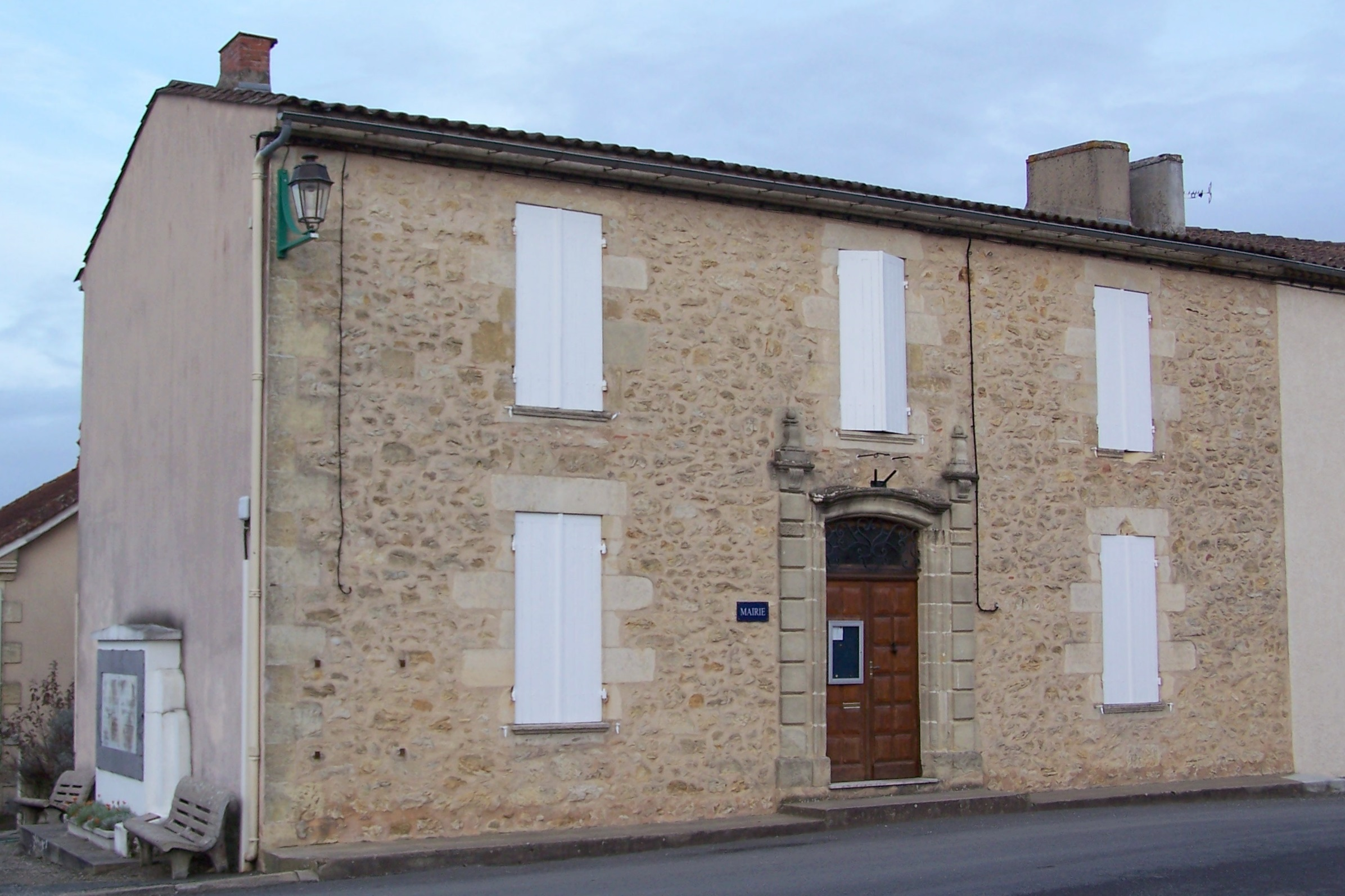
- Town hall
- Location of Saint-Martial
- Location within France Location within Nouvelle-Aquitaine
- Coordinates: 44°38′19″N 0°10′27″W
- Country: France
- Region: Nouvelle-Aquitaine
- Department: Gironde
- Arrondissement: Langon
- Canton: L'Entre-Deux-Mers

Government
  - Mayor (2020–2026): Antoine Peron
- Area^{1}: 7.47 km^{2} (2.88 sq mi)
- Elevation: 85 m (279 ft)
- Highest elevation: 112 m (367 ft)
- Lowest elevation: 47 m (154 ft)
- Population (2023): 236
  - Density: 31.6/km^{2} (81.8/sq mi)
- Time zone: UTC+01:00 (CET)
  - Summer (DST): UTC+02:00 (CEST)
- INSEE/Postal code: 33440 /33490
- ^{1} French Land Register data, which excludes lakes, ponds, glaciers > 1 km^{2} (0.386 sq mi or 247 acres) and river estuaries.

Saint-Martial (French pronunciation: [sɛ̃ maʁsjal]; Occitan: Sant Marçau) is a commune in the Gironde department in Nouvelle-Aquitaine in southwestern France.

== Population ==
Historical population
Year	Pop.	±% p.a.
1968	246	—
1975	194	−3.34%
1982	164	−2.37%
1990	167	+0.23%
1999	170	+0.20%
2007	201	+2.12%
2012	233	+3.00%
2017	242	+0.76%
2023	236	−0.42%
Source: INSEE

== See also ==
- Communes of the Gironde department
