= Le Tourne =

- Commune
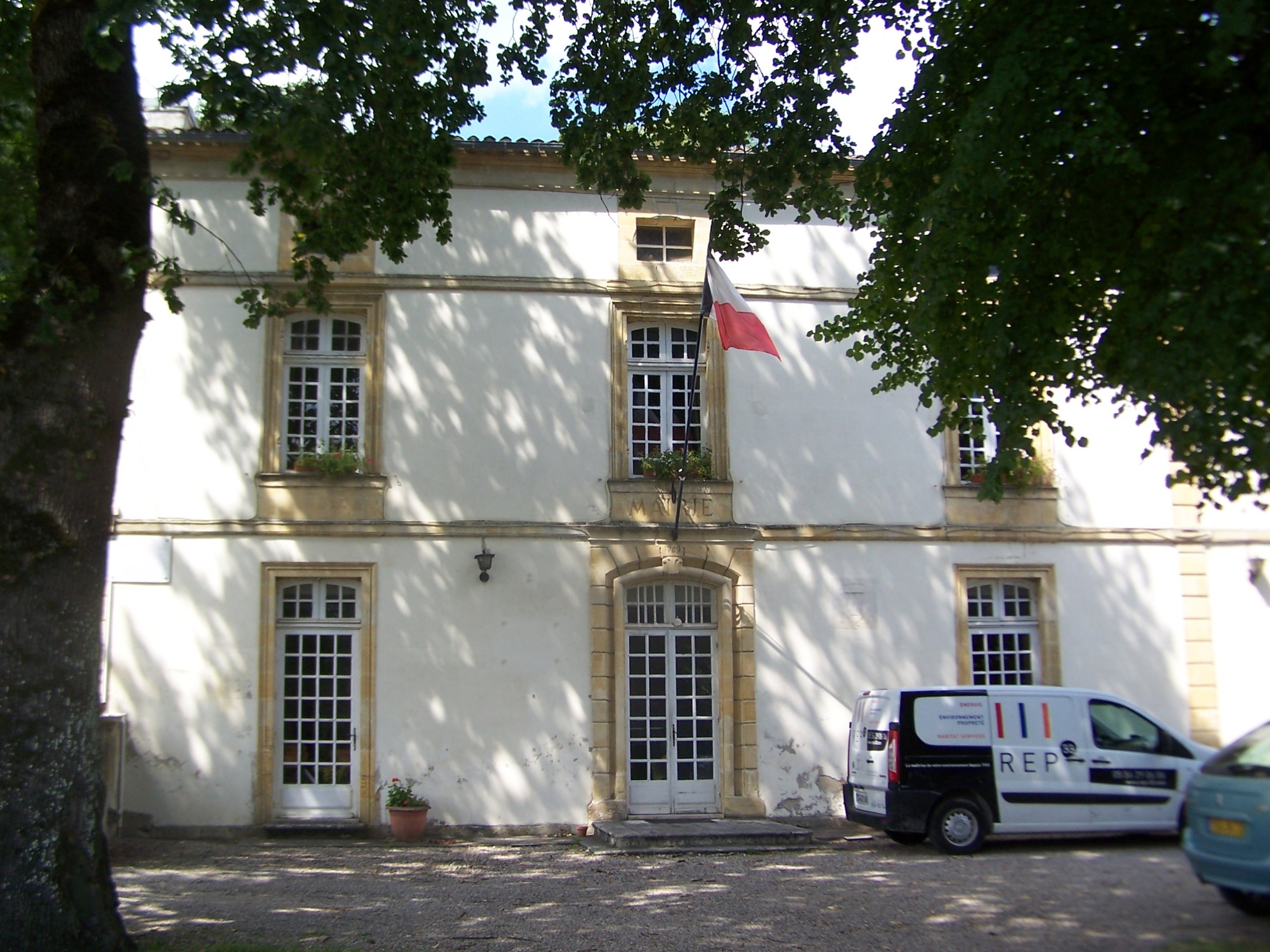
- The town hall in Le Tourne

- Coat of arms
- Location of Le Tourne
- Location within France Location within Nouvelle-Aquitaine
- Coordinates: 44°42′41″N 0°23′59″W
- Country: France
- Region: Nouvelle-Aquitaine
- Department: Gironde
- Arrondissement: Bordeaux
- Canton: L'Entre-Deux-Mers

Government
  - Mayor (2020–2026): Marie-Claude Agullana
- Area^{1}: 2.53 km^{2} (0.98 sq mi)
- Elevation: 30 m (98 ft)
- Highest elevation: 82 m (269 ft)
- Lowest elevation: 3 m (9.8 ft)
- Population (2023): 833
  - Density: 329/km^{2} (853/sq mi)
- Time zone: UTC+01:00 (CET)
  - Summer (DST): UTC+02:00 (CEST)
- INSEE/Postal code: 33534 /33550
- ^{1} French Land Register data, which excludes lakes, ponds, glaciers > 1 km^{2} (0.386 sq mi or 247 acres) and river estuaries.

Le Tourne (French pronunciation: [lə tuʁn]; Occitan: Lo Torne) is a commune in the Gironde department in Nouvelle-Aquitaine in Southwestern France.

== Population ==
Historical population
Year	Pop.	±% p.a.
1968	696	—
1975	714	+0.37%
1982	762	+0.93%
1990	698	−1.09%
1999	695	−0.05%
2007	737	+0.74%
2012	763	+0.70%
2017	812	+1.25%
2023	833	+0.43%
Source: INSEE

== See also ==
- Communes of the Gironde department
