= Paillet =

- Commune
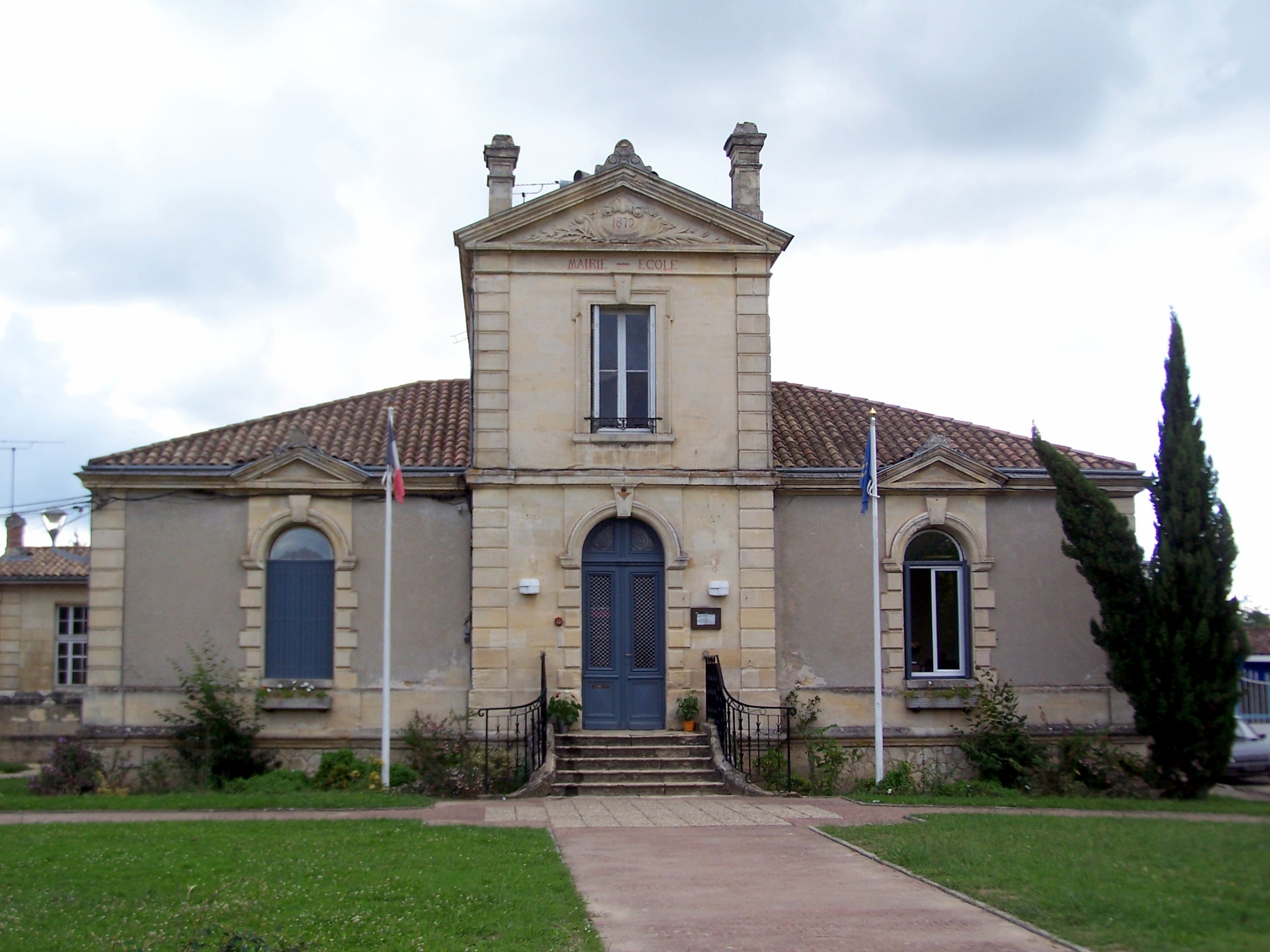
- The town hall in Paillet

- Coat of arms
- Location of Paillet
- Location within France Location within Nouvelle-Aquitaine
- Coordinates: 44°41′11″N 0°21′49″W
- Country: France
- Region: Nouvelle-Aquitaine
- Department: Gironde
- Arrondissement: Langon
- Canton: L'Entre-Deux-Mers

Government
  - Mayor (2020–2026): Jérôme Gauthier
- Area^{1}: 2.48 km^{2} (0.96 sq mi)
- Elevation: 45 m (148 ft)
- Highest elevation: 92 m (302 ft)
- Lowest elevation: 4 m (13 ft)
- Population (2023): 1,175
  - Density: 474/km^{2} (1,230/sq mi)
- Time zone: UTC+01:00 (CET)
  - Summer (DST): UTC+02:00 (CEST)
- INSEE/Postal code: 33311 /33550
- ^{1} French Land Register data, which excludes lakes, ponds, glaciers > 1 km^{2} (0.386 sq mi or 247 acres) and river estuaries.

Paillet (French pronunciation: [pajɛ]; Occitan: Palhet) is a commune in the Gironde department in Nouvelle-Aquitaine in southwestern France.

== Population ==
Historical population
Year	Pop.	±% p.a.
1968	839	—
1975	792	−0.82%
1982	872	+1.38%
1990	934	+0.86%
1999	989	+0.64%
2007	1,150	+1.90%
2012	1,213	+1.07%
2017	1,213	+0.00%
2023	1,175	−0.53%
Source: INSEE

== See also ==
- Communes of the Gironde department
