= Monprimblanc =

- Commune
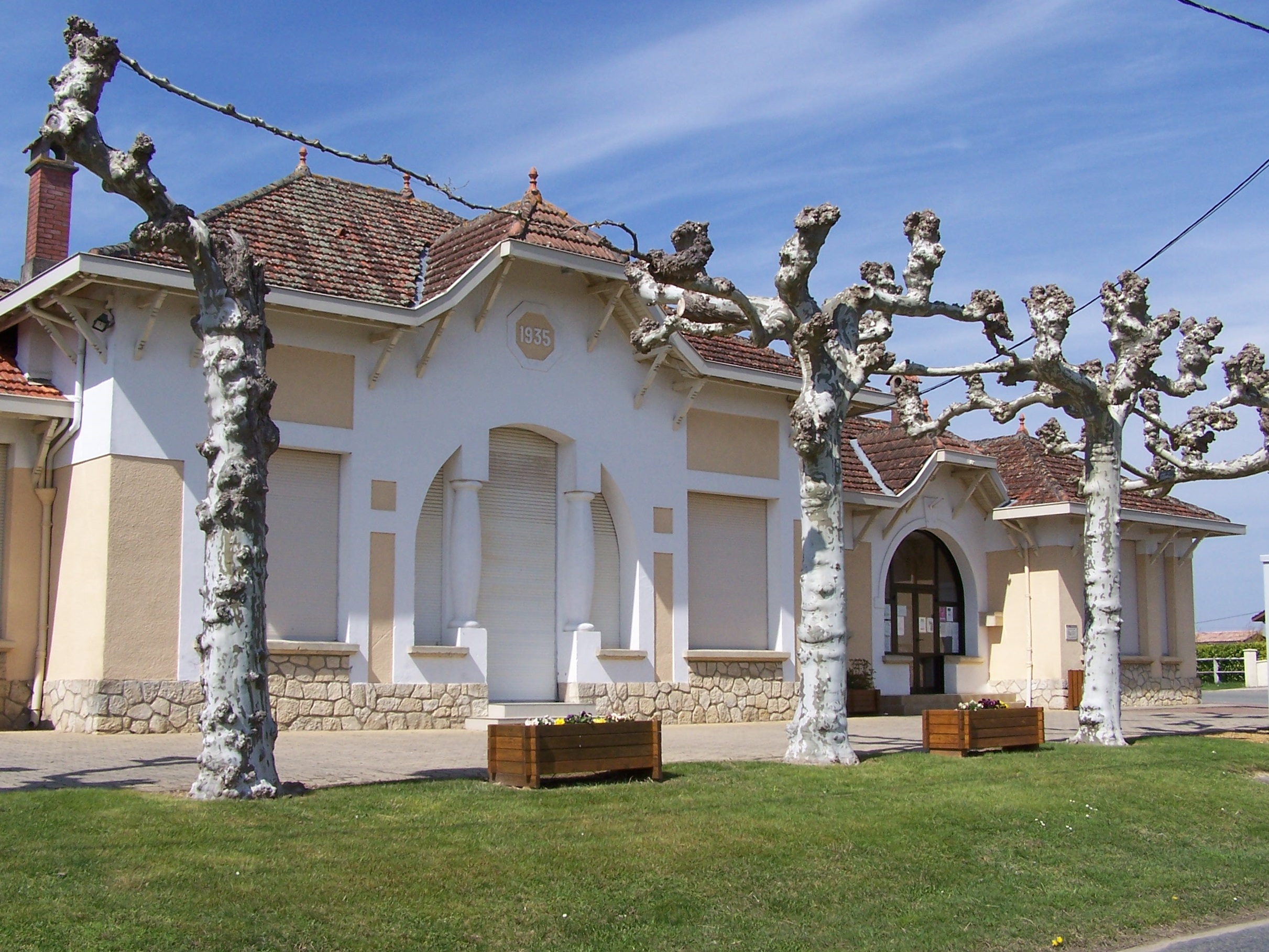
- Town hall
- Location of Monprimblanc
- Location within France Location within Nouvelle-Aquitaine
- Coordinates: 44°37′51″N 0°15′40″W
- Country: France
- Region: Nouvelle-Aquitaine
- Department: Gironde
- Arrondissement: Langon
- Canton: L'Entre-Deux-Mers

Government
  - Mayor (2020–2026): Hervé David
- Area^{1}: 4.97 km^{2} (1.92 sq mi)
- Elevation: 97 m (318 ft)
- Highest elevation: 116 m (381 ft)
- Lowest elevation: 24 m (79 ft)
- Population (2023): 276
  - Density: 55.5/km^{2} (144/sq mi)
- Time zone: UTC+01:00 (CET)
  - Summer (DST): UTC+02:00 (CEST)
- INSEE/Postal code: 33288 /33410
- ^{1} French Land Register data, which excludes lakes, ponds, glaciers > 1 km^{2} (0.386 sq mi or 247 acres) and river estuaries.

Monprimblanc (French pronunciation: [mɔ̃pʁɛ̃blɑ̃]; Occitan: Montprimblan) is a commune in the Gironde department in Nouvelle-Aquitaine in southwestern France.

== Population ==
Historical population
Year	Pop.	±% p.a.
1968	330	—
1975	275	−2.57%
1982	250	−1.35%
1990	257	+0.35%
1999	276	+0.80%
2007	274	−0.09%
2012	277	+0.22%
2017	300	+1.61%
2023	276	−1.38%
Source: INSEE

== See also ==
- Communes of the Gironde department
