= Saint-Laurent-du-Plan =

- Commune
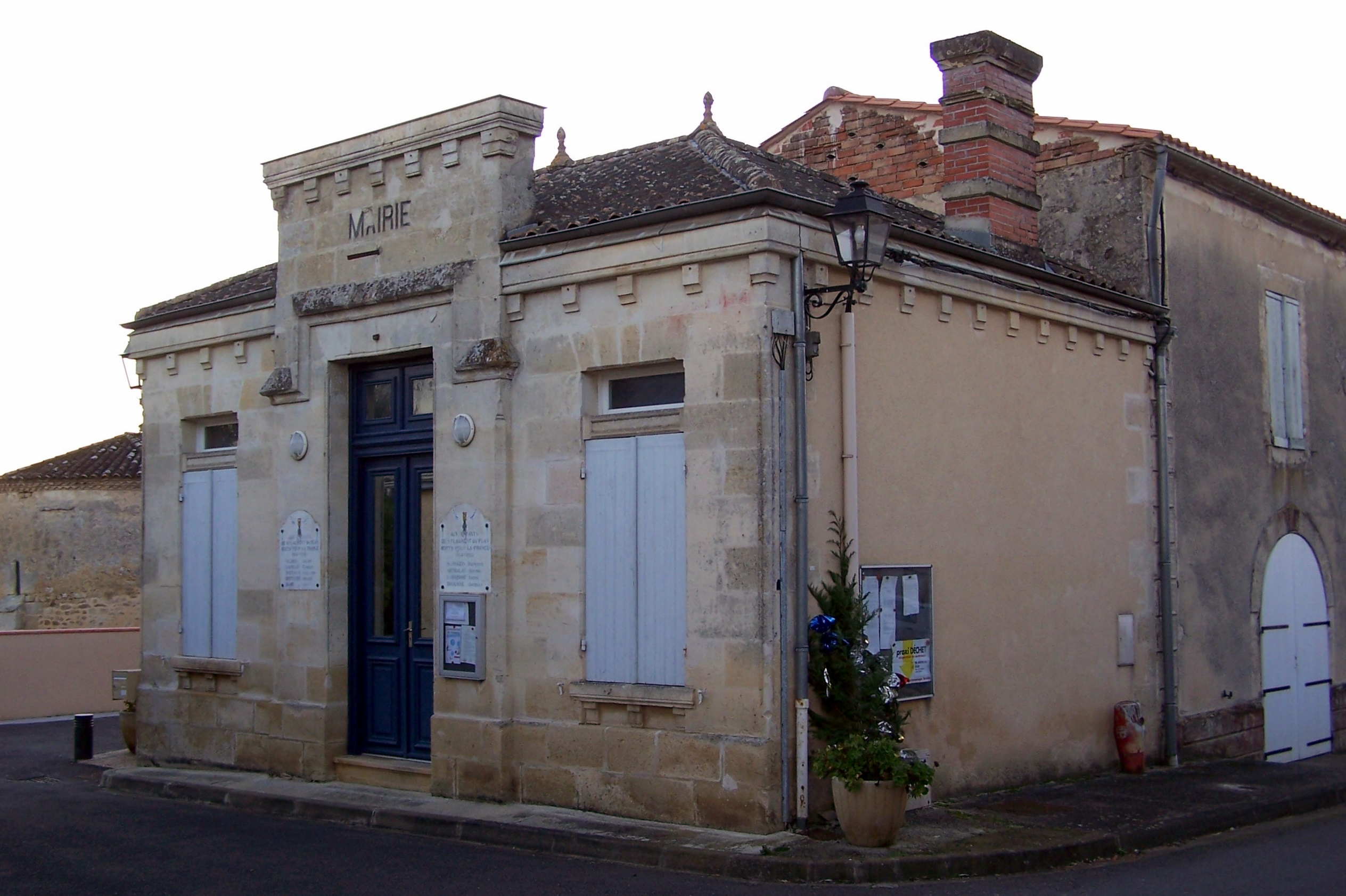
- Town hall
- Location of Saint-Laurent-du-Plan
- Location within France Location within Nouvelle-Aquitaine
- Coordinates: 44°37′29″N 0°07′01″W
- Country: France
- Region: Nouvelle-Aquitaine
- Department: Gironde
- Arrondissement: Langon
- Canton: L'Entre-Deux-Mers

Government
  - Mayor (2020–2026): Franck Boulin
- Area^{1}: 2.39 km^{2} (0.92 sq mi)
- Elevation: 53 m (174 ft)
- Highest elevation: 82 m (269 ft)
- Lowest elevation: 19 m (62 ft)
- Population (2023): 85
  - Density: 36/km^{2} (92/sq mi)
- Time zone: UTC+01:00 (CET)
  - Summer (DST): UTC+02:00 (CEST)
- INSEE/Postal code: 33428 /33190
- ^{1} French Land Register data, which excludes lakes, ponds, glaciers > 1 km^{2} (0.386 sq mi or 247 acres) and river estuaries.

Saint-Laurent-du-Plan (French pronunciation: [sɛ̃ loʁɑ̃ dy plɑ̃]; Occitan: Sent Laurenç dau Plan) is a commune in the Gironde department in Nouvelle-Aquitaine in southwestern France.

== Population ==
Historical population
Year	Pop.	±% p.a.
1968	80	—
1975	75	−0.92%
1982	74	−0.19%
1990	79	+0.82%
1999	71	−1.18%
2007	81	+1.66%
2012	90	+2.13%
2017	92	+0.44%
2023	85	−1.31%
Source: INSEE

== See also ==
- Communes of the Gironde department
