= Soulignac =

- Commune
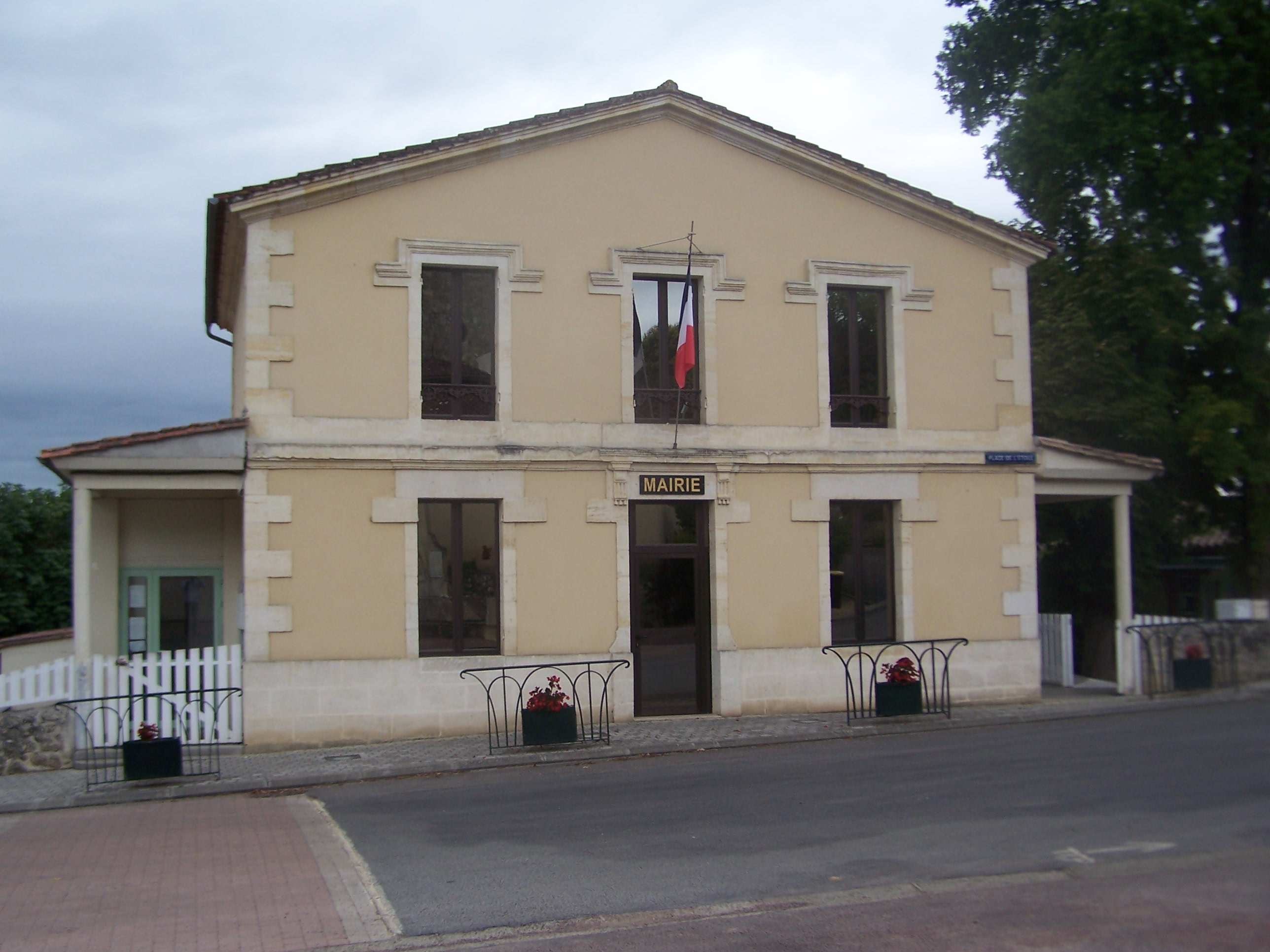
- The town hall in Soulignac
- Location of Soulignac
- Location within France Location within Nouvelle-Aquitaine
- Coordinates: 44°41′56″N 0°16′55″W
- Country: France
- Region: Nouvelle-Aquitaine
- Department: Gironde
- Arrondissement: Langon
- Canton: L'Entre-Deux-Mers

Government
  - Mayor (2020–2026): Michel Dulon
- Area^{1}: 11.49 km^{2} (4.44 sq mi)
- Elevation: 106 m (348 ft)
- Highest elevation: 111 m (364 ft)
- Lowest elevation: 34 m (112 ft)
- Population (2023): 409
  - Density: 35.6/km^{2} (92.2/sq mi)
- Time zone: UTC+01:00 (CET)
  - Summer (DST): UTC+02:00 (CEST)
- INSEE/Postal code: 33515 /33760
- ^{1} French Land Register data, which excludes lakes, ponds, glaciers > 1 km^{2} (0.386 sq mi or 247 acres) and river estuaries.

Soulignac (French pronunciation: [suliɲak]; Occitan: Solinhac) is a commune in the Gironde department in Nouvelle-Aquitaine in southwestern France.

== Population ==
Historical population
| Year | Pop. | ±% p.a. |
|---|---|---|
| 1968 | 480 | — |
| 1975 | 419 | −1.92% |
| 1982 | 407 | −0.41% |
| 1990 | 402 | −0.15% |
| 1999 | 424 | +0.59% |
| 2007 | 455 | +0.89% |
| 2012 | 439 | −0.71% |
| 2017 | 432 | −0.32% |
| 2023 | 409 | −0.91% |
Source: INSEE

== See also ==
- Communes of the Gironde department
