= Blésignac =

- Commune
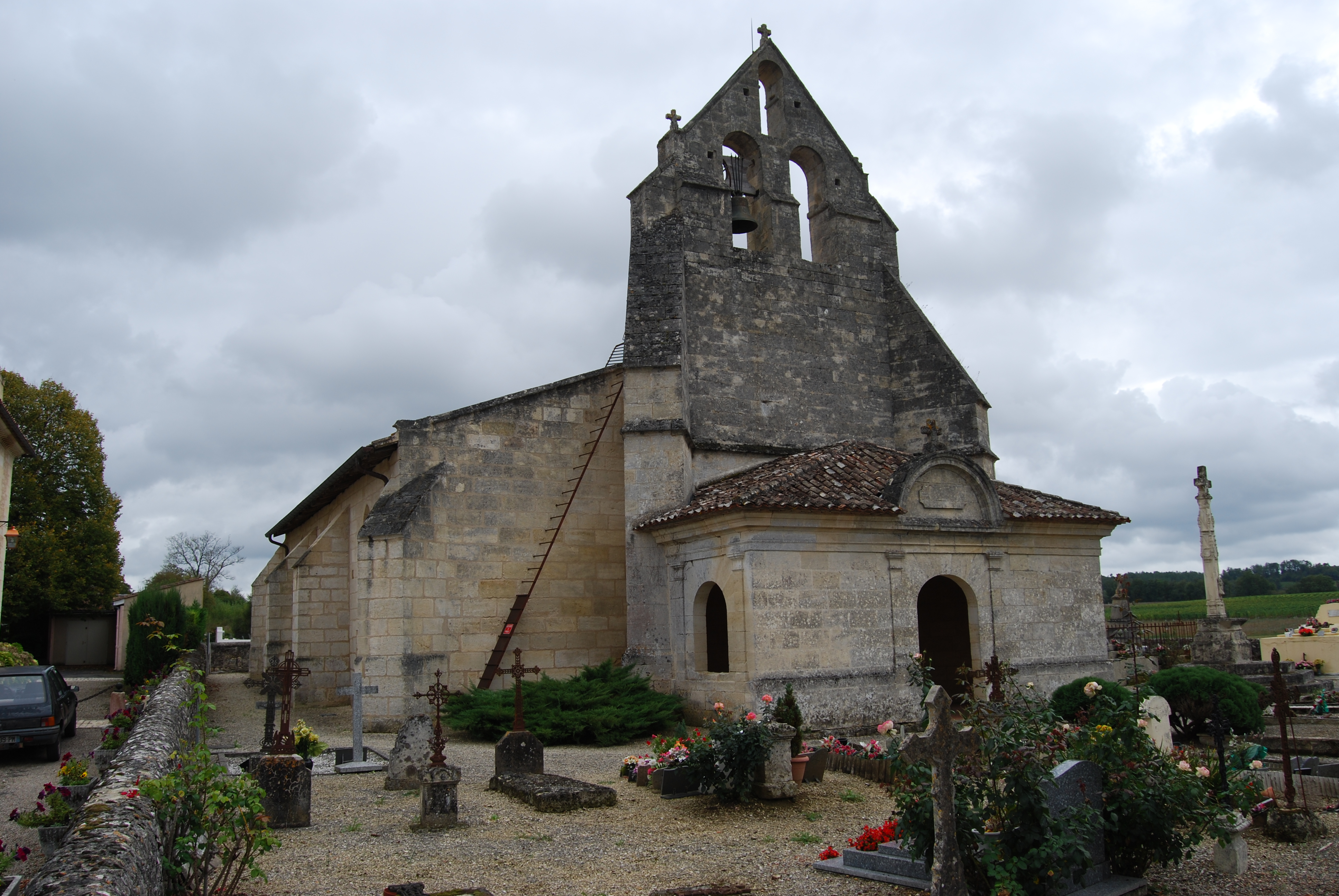
- The church in Blésignac
- Location of Blésignac
- Location within France Location within Nouvelle-Aquitaine
- Coordinates: 44°46′34″N 0°15′25″W
- Country: France
- Region: Nouvelle-Aquitaine
- Department: Gironde
- Arrondissement: Bordeaux
- Canton: L'Entre-Deux-Mers
- Intercommunality: Créonnais

Government
  - Mayor (2020–2026): Jean-François Thillet
- Area^{1}: 2.5 km^{2} (0.97 sq mi)
- Elevation: 65 m (213 ft)
- Highest elevation: 80 m (260 ft)
- Lowest elevation: 33 m (108 ft)
- Population (2023): 313
  - Density: 130/km^{2} (320/sq mi)
- Time zone: UTC+01:00 (CET)
  - Summer (DST): UTC+02:00 (CEST)
- INSEE/Postal code: 33059 /33670
- ^{1} French Land Register data, which excludes lakes, ponds, glaciers > 1 km^{2} (0.386 sq mi or 247 acres) and river estuaries.

Blésignac (French pronunciation: [bleziɲak]; Occitan: Blesinhac) is a commune in the Gironde department in Nouvelle-Aquitaine in southwestern France.

== Population ==
Historical population
| Year | Pop. | ±% p.a. |
|---|---|---|
| 1968 | 168 | — |
| 1975 | 162 | −0.52% |
| 1982 | 171 | +0.78% |
| 1990 | 201 | +2.04% |
| 1999 | 249 | +2.41% |
| 2007 | 295 | +2.14% |
| 2012 | 317 | +1.45% |
| 2017 | 303 | −0.90% |
| 2023 | 313 | +0.54% |
Source: INSEE

== See also ==
- Communes of the Gironde department
