= Cessac =

- Commune
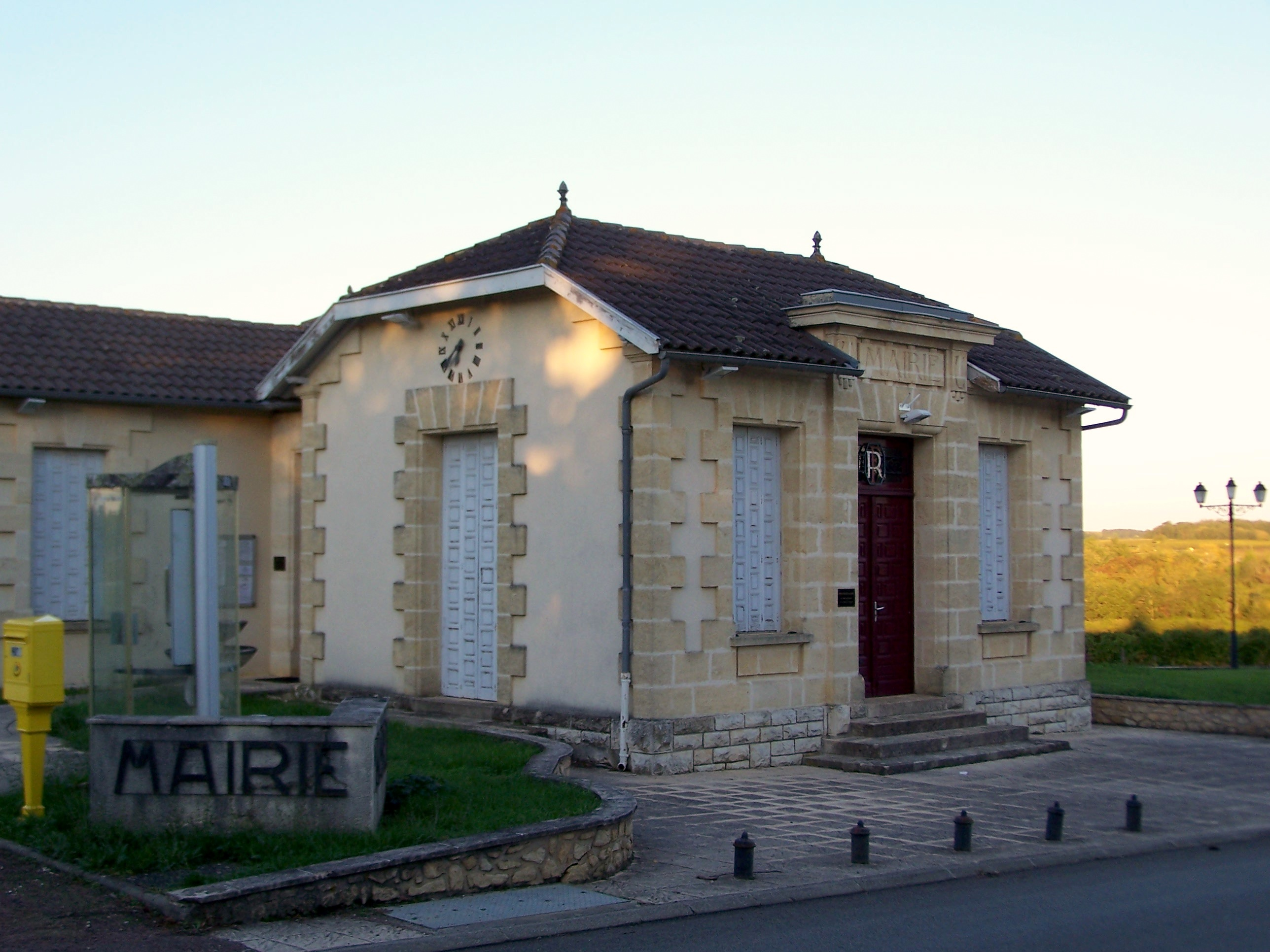
- Town hall
- Location of Cessac
- Location within France Location within Nouvelle-Aquitaine
- Coordinates: 44°44′38″N 0°10′37″W
- Country: France
- Region: Nouvelle-Aquitaine
- Department: Gironde
- Arrondissement: Langon
- Canton: L'Entre-Deux-Mers

Government
  - Mayor (2020–2026): Marie-Claude Reynaud
- Area^{1}: 3.65 km^{2} (1.41 sq mi)
- Elevation: 30 m (98 ft)
- Highest elevation: 77 m (253 ft)
- Lowest elevation: 21 m (69 ft)
- Population (2023): 196
  - Density: 53.7/km^{2} (139/sq mi)
- Time zone: UTC+01:00 (CET)
  - Summer (DST): UTC+02:00 (CEST)
- INSEE/Postal code: 33121 /33760
- ^{1} French Land Register data, which excludes lakes, ponds, glaciers > 1 km^{2} (0.386 sq mi or 247 acres) and river estuaries.

Cessac (French pronunciation: [sesak]; Occitan: Ceçac) is a commune in the Gironde department in Nouvelle-Aquitaine in southwestern France.

== Population ==
Historical population
Year	Pop.	±% p.a.
1968	189	—
1975	139	−4.29%
1982	173	+3.18%
1990	179	+0.43%
1999	169	−0.64%
2007	185	+1.14%
2012	186	+0.11%
2017	194	+0.85%
2023	196	+0.17%
Source: INSEE

== See also ==
- Communes of the Gironde department
