= Saint-Martin-de-Sescas =

- Commune
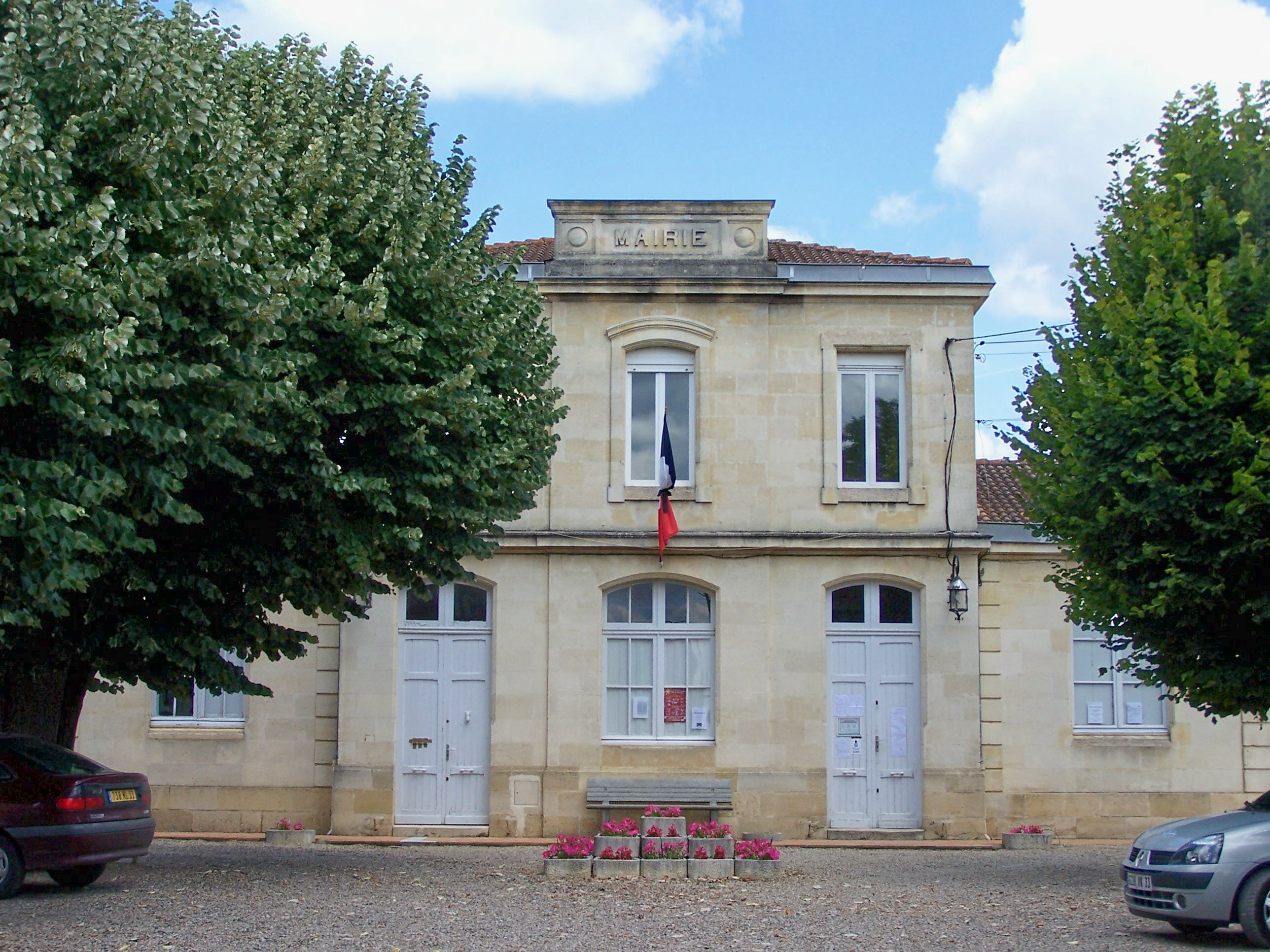
- Town hall
- Location of Saint-Martin-de-Sescas
- Location within France Location within Nouvelle-Aquitaine
- Coordinates: 44°34′33″N 0°09′41″W
- Country: France
- Region: Nouvelle-Aquitaine
- Department: Gironde
- Arrondissement: Langon
- Canton: L'Entre-Deux-Mers

Government
  - Mayor (2020–2026): Matthias Robine
- Area^{1}: 8.19 km^{2} (3.16 sq mi)
- Elevation: 39 m (128 ft)
- Highest elevation: 114 m (374 ft)
- Lowest elevation: 5 m (16 ft)
- Population (2023): 558
  - Density: 68.1/km^{2} (176/sq mi)
- Time zone: UTC+01:00 (CET)
  - Summer (DST): UTC+02:00 (CEST)
- INSEE/Postal code: 33444 /33490
- ^{1} French Land Register data, which excludes lakes, ponds, glaciers > 1 km^{2} (0.386 sq mi or 247 acres) and river estuaries.

Saint-Martin-de-Sescas (Gascon: Sent Martin de Sescàs) is a commune in the Gironde department in Nouvelle-Aquitaine in southwestern France.

== Population ==
Historical population
Year	Pop.	±% p.a.
1968	427	—
1975	374	−1.88%
1982	401	+1.00%
1990	426	+0.76%
1999	471	+1.12%
2007	497	+0.67%
2012	569	+2.74%
2017	589	+0.69%
2023	558	−0.90%
Source: INSEE

== See also ==
- Communes of the Gironde department
