= Mourens =

- Commune
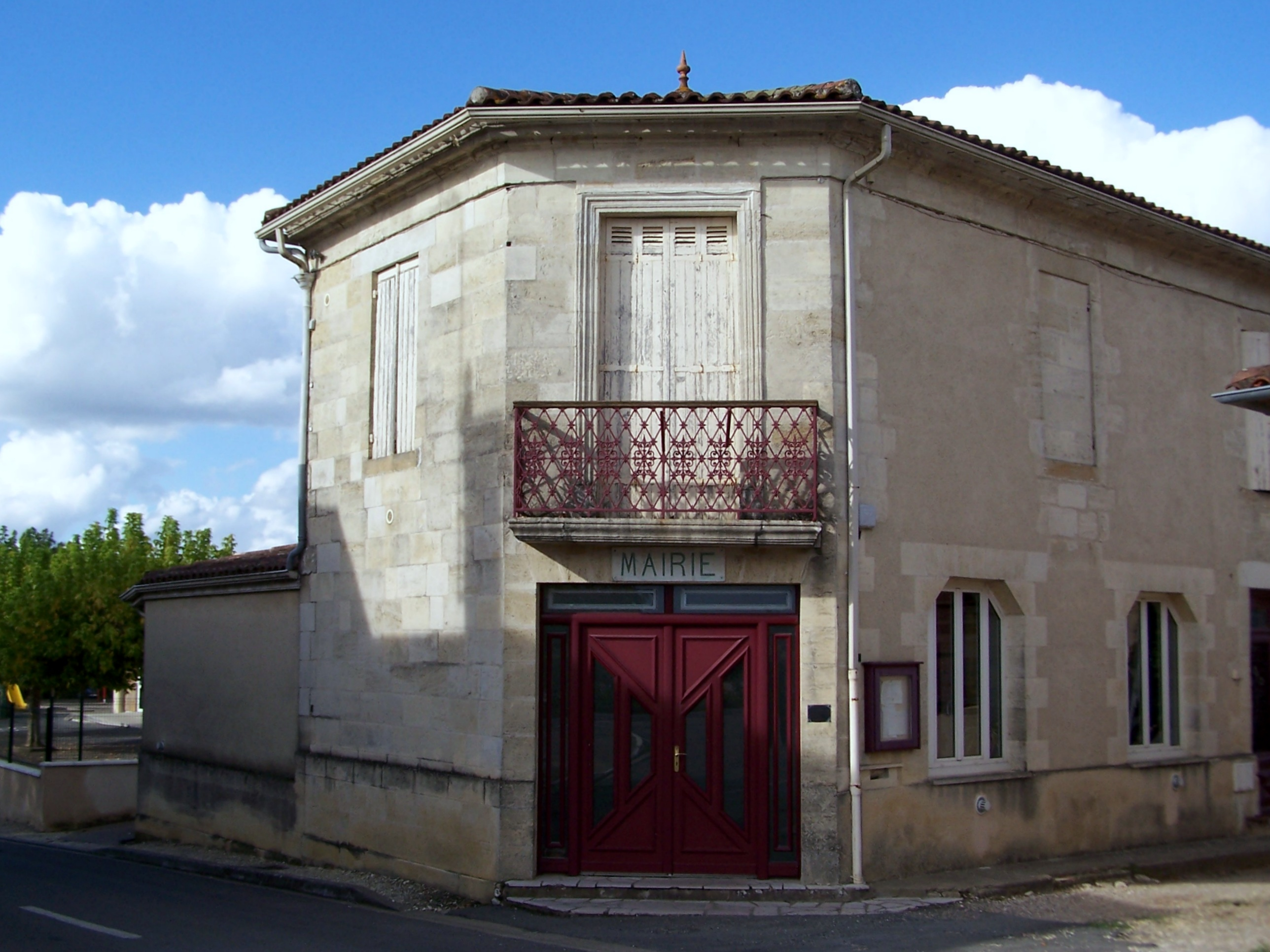
- Town hall
- Location of Mourens
- Location within France Location within Nouvelle-Aquitaine
- Coordinates: 44°39′00″N 0°12′31″W
- Country: France
- Region: Nouvelle-Aquitaine
- Department: Gironde
- Arrondissement: Langon
- Canton: L'Entre-Deux-Mers

Government
  - Mayor (2020–2026): Philippe Jean Portejoie
- Area^{1}: 10.63 km^{2} (4.10 sq mi)
- Elevation: 115 m (377 ft)
- Highest elevation: 116 m (381 ft)
- Lowest elevation: 47 m (154 ft)
- Population (2023): 392
  - Density: 36.9/km^{2} (95.5/sq mi)
- Time zone: UTC+01:00 (CET)
  - Summer (DST): UTC+02:00 (CEST)
- INSEE/Postal code: 33299 /33410
- ^{1} French Land Register data, which excludes lakes, ponds, glaciers > 1 km^{2} (0.386 sq mi or 247 acres) and river estuaries.

Mourens is a commune in the Gironde department in Nouvelle-Aquitaine in southwestern France.

== Population ==
Historical population
Year	Pop.	±% p.a.
1968	434	—
1975	385	−1.70%
1982	382	−0.11%
1990	341	−1.41%
1999	358	+0.54%
2007	392	+1.14%
2012	371	−1.10%
2017	385	+0.74%
2023	392	+0.30%
Source: INSEE

== See also ==
- Communes of the Gironde department
