= Montignac, Gironde =

Montignac
- Commune
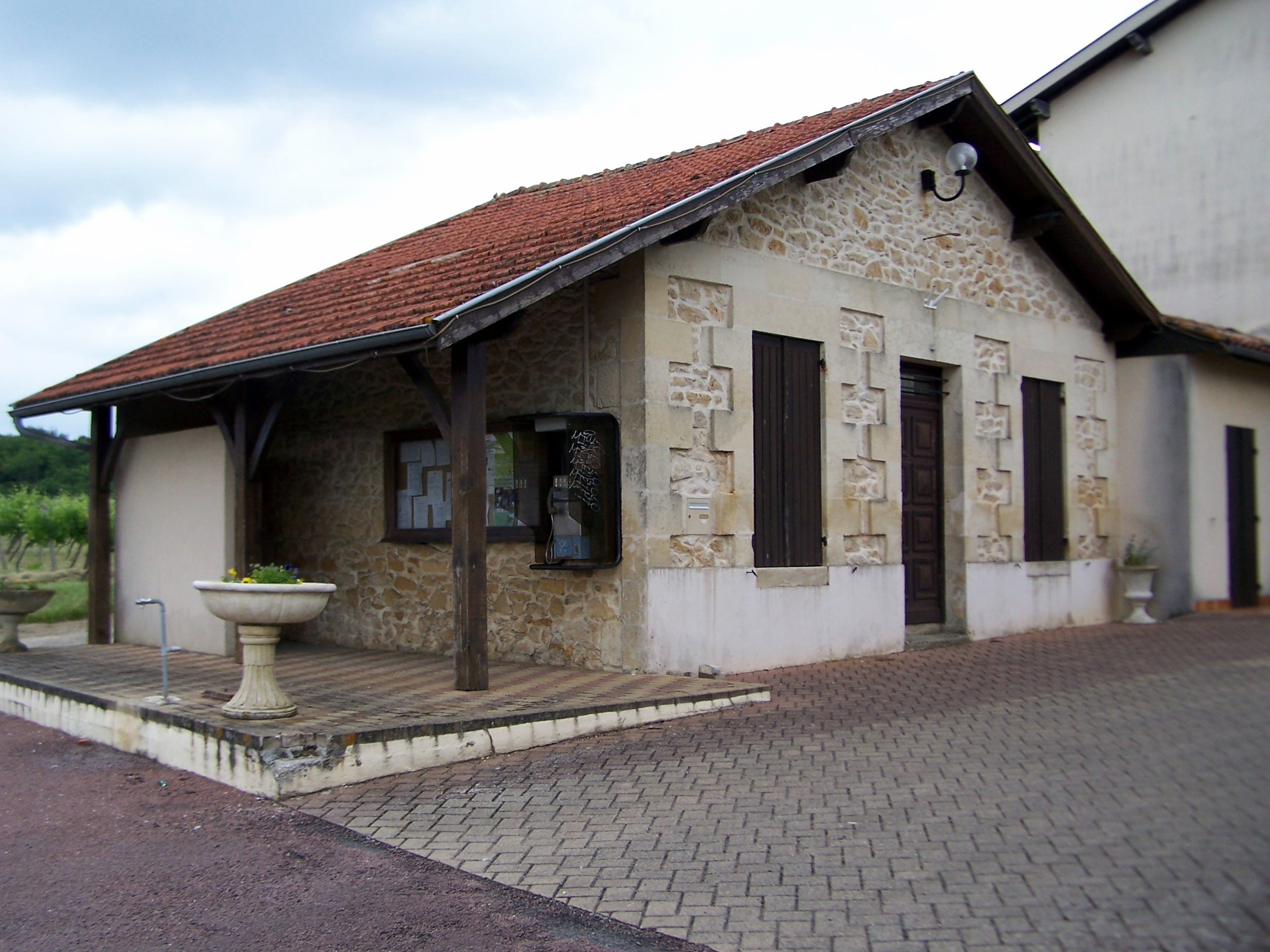
- Town hall
- Location of Montignac
- Location within France Location within Nouvelle-Aquitaine
- Coordinates: 44°42′46″N 0°13′25″W
- Country: France
- Region: Nouvelle-Aquitaine
- Department: Gironde
- Arrondissement: Langon
- Canton: L'Entre-Deux-Mers

Government
  - Mayor (2020–2026): Cyril Abela
- Area^{1}: 6.48 km^{2} (2.50 sq mi)
- Elevation: 74 m (243 ft)
- Highest elevation: 105 m (344 ft)
- Lowest elevation: 49 m (161 ft)
- Population (2023): 133
  - Density: 20.5/km^{2} (53.2/sq mi)
- Time zone: UTC+01:00 (CET)
  - Summer (DST): UTC+02:00 (CEST)
- INSEE/Postal code: 33292 /33760
- ^{1} French Land Register data, which excludes lakes, ponds, glaciers > 1 km^{2} (0.386 sq mi or 247 acres) and river estuaries.

Montignac (French pronunciation: [mɔ̃tiɲak]; Occitan: Montinhac) is a commune in the Gironde department in Nouvelle-Aquitaine in southwestern France.

== Population ==
Historical population
Year	Pop.	±% p.a.
1968	102	—
1975	91	−1.62%
1982	111	+2.88%
1990	100	−1.30%
1999	111	+1.17%
2007	132	+2.19%
2012	155	+3.26%
2017	139	−2.16%
2023	133	−0.73%
Source: INSEE

== See also ==
- Communes of the Gironde department
