= Saint-Léon, Gironde =

Saint-Léon
- Commune
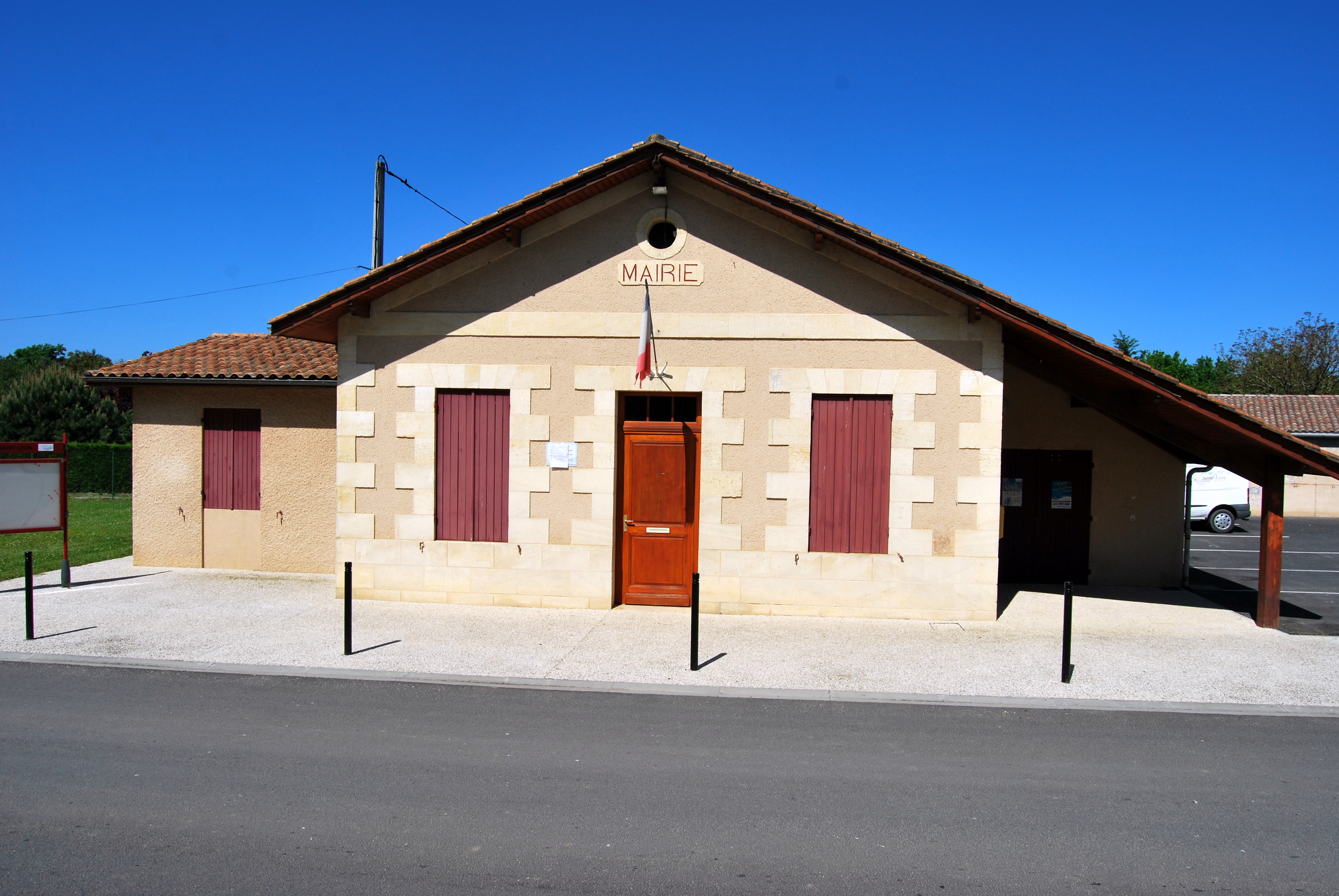
- The town hall in Saint-Léon
- Location of Saint-Léon
- Location within France Location within Nouvelle-Aquitaine
- Coordinates: 44°45′45″N 0°16′41″W
- Country: France
- Region: Nouvelle-Aquitaine
- Department: Gironde
- Arrondissement: Bordeaux
- Canton: L'Entre-Deux-Mers
- Intercommunality: Créonnais

Government
  - Mayor (2020–2026): Nicolas Tarbes
- Area^{1}: 4.49 km^{2} (1.73 sq mi)
- Elevation: 65 m (213 ft)
- Highest elevation: 117 m (384 ft)
- Lowest elevation: 45 m (148 ft)
- Population (2023): 291
  - Density: 64.8/km^{2} (168/sq mi)
- Time zone: UTC+01:00 (CET)
  - Summer (DST): UTC+02:00 (CEST)
- INSEE/Postal code: 33431 /33670
- ^{1} French Land Register data, which excludes lakes, ponds, glaciers > 1 km^{2} (0.386 sq mi or 247 acres) and river estuaries.

Saint-Léon (French pronunciation: [sɛ̃ leɔ̃]; Gascon: Sent Leon) is a commune in the Gironde department in Nouvelle-Aquitaine in southwestern France.

== Population ==
Historical population
Year	Pop.	±% p.a.
1968	197	—
1975	174	−1.76%
1982	198	+1.86%
1990	195	−0.19%
1999	242	+2.43%
2007	293	+2.42%
2012	345	+3.32%
2017	339	−0.35%
2023	291	−2.51%
Source: INSEE

== See also ==
- Communes of the Gironde department
