= Coirac =

- Commune
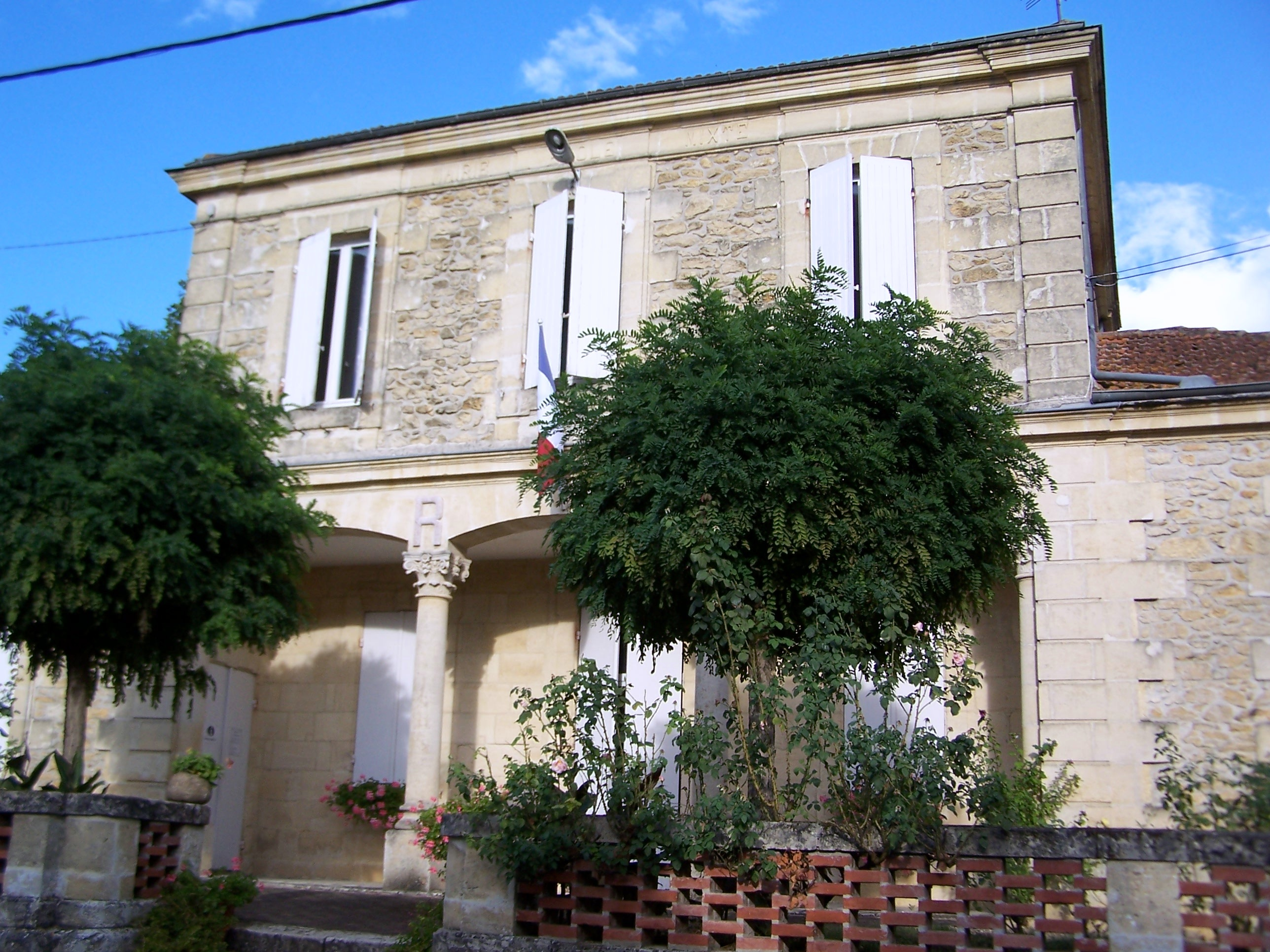
- Town hall
- Location of Coirac
- Location within France Location within Nouvelle-Aquitaine
- Coordinates: 44°41′32″N 0°10′00″W
- Country: France
- Region: Nouvelle-Aquitaine
- Department: Gironde
- Arrondissement: Langon
- Canton: L'Entre-Deux-Mers

Government
  - Mayor (2020–2026): Jean-Claude Bernede
- Area^{1}: 5.76 km^{2} (2.22 sq mi)
- Elevation: 66 m (217 ft)
- Highest elevation: 91 m (299 ft)
- Lowest elevation: 48 m (157 ft)
- Population (2023): 219
  - Density: 38.0/km^{2} (98.5/sq mi)
- Time zone: UTC+01:00 (CET)
  - Summer (DST): UTC+02:00 (CEST)
- INSEE/Postal code: 33131 /33540
- ^{1} French Land Register data, which excludes lakes, ponds, glaciers > 1 km^{2} (0.386 sq mi or 247 acres) and river estuaries.

Coirac (French pronunciation: [kwaʁak]) is a commune in the Gironde department in Nouvelle-Aquitaine in southwestern France.

== Population ==
Historical population
| Year | Pop. | ±% p.a. |
|---|---|---|
| 1968 | 175 | — |
| 1975 | 165 | −0.84% |
| 1982 | 157 | −0.71% |
| 1990 | 164 | +0.55% |
| 1999 | 179 | +0.98% |
| 2007 | 190 | +0.75% |
| 2012 | 211 | +2.12% |
| 2017 | 202 | −0.87% |
| 2023 | 219 | +1.36% |
Source: INSEE

== See also ==
- Communes of the Gironde department
