= Omet =

- Commune
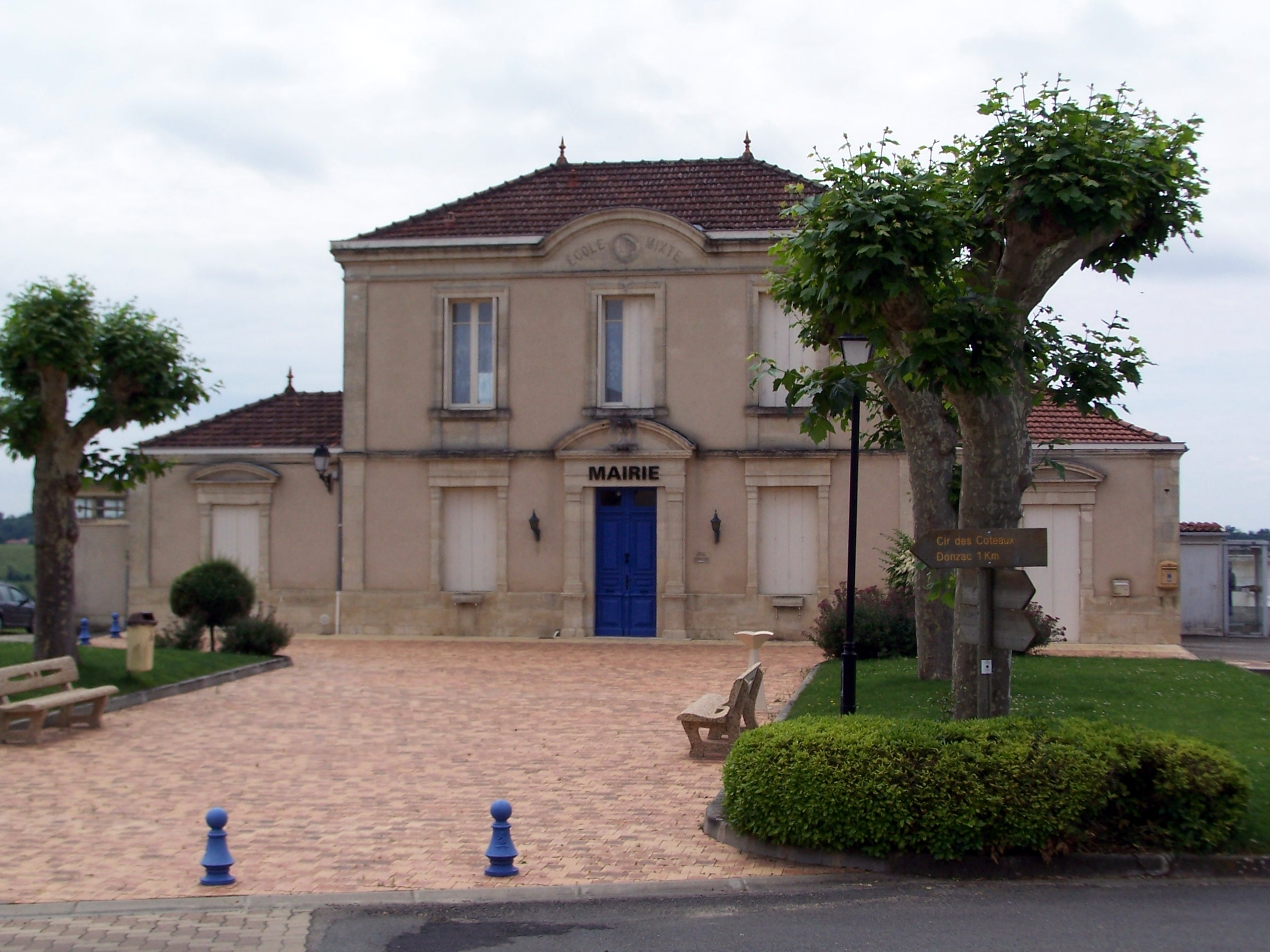
- Town hall
- Location of Omet
- Location within France Location within Nouvelle-Aquitaine
- Coordinates: 44°39′07″N 0°16′52″W
- Country: France
- Region: Nouvelle-Aquitaine
- Department: Gironde
- Arrondissement: Langon
- Canton: L'Entre-Deux-Mers

Government
  - Mayor (2020–2026): Jean-François Dal'Cin
- Area^{1}: 2.62 km^{2} (1.01 sq mi)
- Elevation: 84 m (276 ft)
- Highest elevation: 84 m (276 ft)
- Lowest elevation: 84 m (276 ft)
- Population (2023): 280
  - Density: 110/km^{2} (280/sq mi)
- Time zone: UTC+01:00 (CET)
  - Summer (DST): UTC+02:00 (CEST)
- INSEE/Postal code: 33308 /33410
- Website: www.omet.fr
- ^{1} French Land Register data, which excludes lakes, ponds, glaciers > 1 km^{2} (0.386 sq mi or 247 acres) and river estuaries.

Omet (French pronunciation: [ɔmɛ]) is a commune in the Gironde department in Nouvelle-Aquitaine in southwestern France.

== Population ==
Historical population
Year	Pop.	±% p.a.
1968	222	—
1975	164	−4.23%
1982	176	+1.01%
1990	206	+1.99%
1999	226	+1.03%
2007	234	+0.44%
2012	286	+4.10%
2017	296	+0.69%
2023	280	−0.92%
Source: INSEE

== See also ==
- Communes of the Gironde department
