= Sainte-Foy-la-Longue =

- Commune
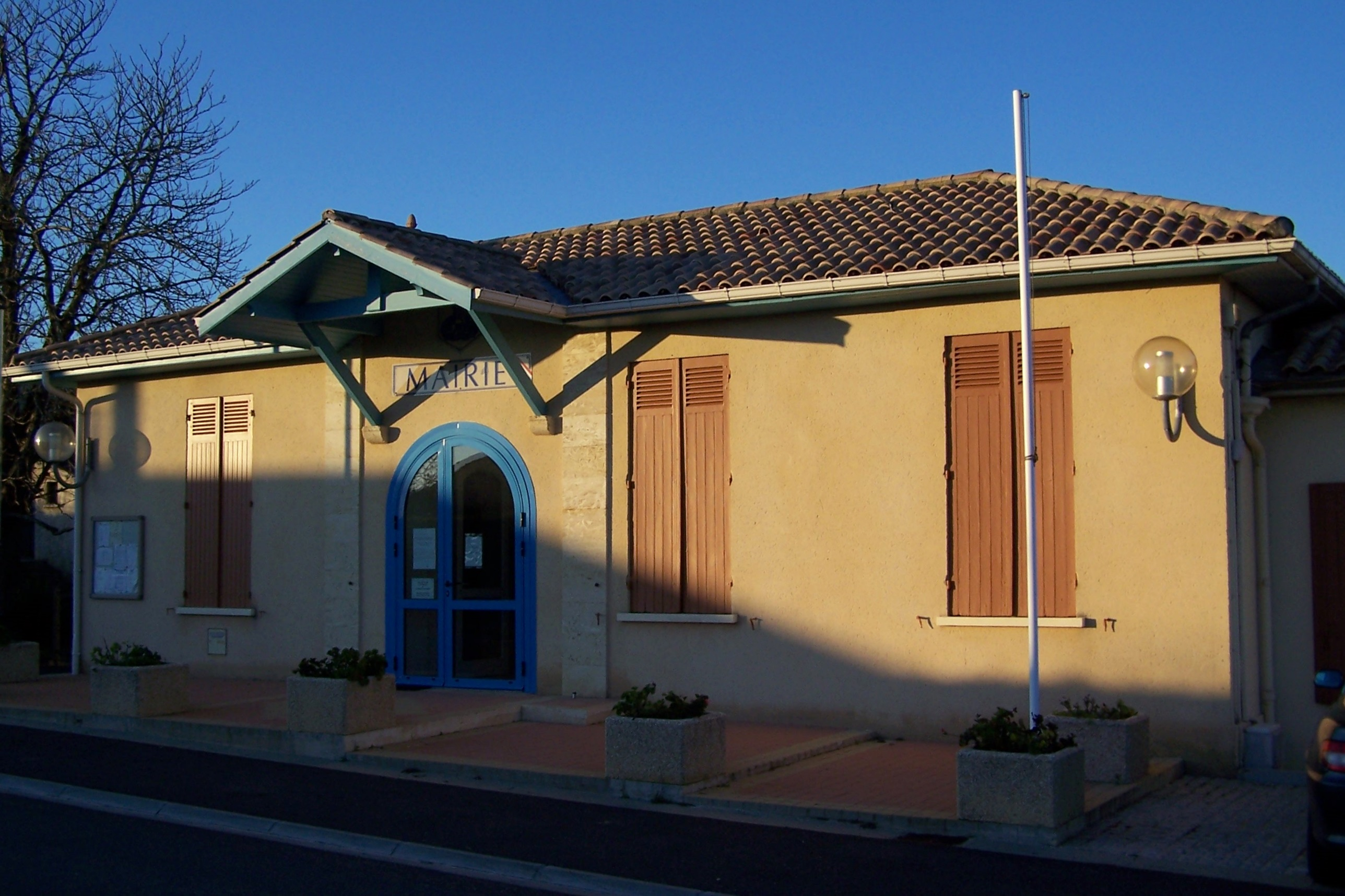
- Town hall
- Location of Sainte-Foy-la-Longue
- Location within France Location within Nouvelle-Aquitaine
- Coordinates: 44°36′39″N 0°08′40″W
- Country: France
- Region: Nouvelle-Aquitaine
- Department: Gironde
- Arrondissement: Langon
- Canton: L'Entre-Deux-Mers

Government
  - Mayor (2020–2026): Henri Joanchicoy
- Area^{1}: 9.37 km^{2} (3.62 sq mi)
- Elevation: 109 m (358 ft)
- Highest elevation: 113 m (371 ft)
- Lowest elevation: 40 m (130 ft)
- Population (2023): 139
  - Density: 14.8/km^{2} (38.4/sq mi)
- Time zone: UTC+01:00 (CET)
  - Summer (DST): UTC+02:00 (CEST)
- INSEE/Postal code: 33403 /33490
- ^{1} French Land Register data, which excludes lakes, ponds, glaciers > 1 km^{2} (0.386 sq mi or 247 acres) and river estuaries.

Sainte-Foy-la-Longue (French pronunciation: [sɛ̃t fwa la lɔ̃ɡ]; Occitan: Senta He la Longa) is a commune in the Gironde department in Nouvelle-Aquitaine in southwestern France.

== Population ==
Historical population
Year	Pop.	±% p.a.
1968	148	—
1975	139	−0.89%
1982	134	−0.52%
1990	151	+1.50%
1999	115	−2.98%
2007	133	+1.83%
2012	134	+0.15%
2017	122	−1.86%
2023	139	+2.20%
Source: INSEE

== See also ==
- Communes of the Gironde department
