= Saint-Laurent-du-Bois =

- Commune
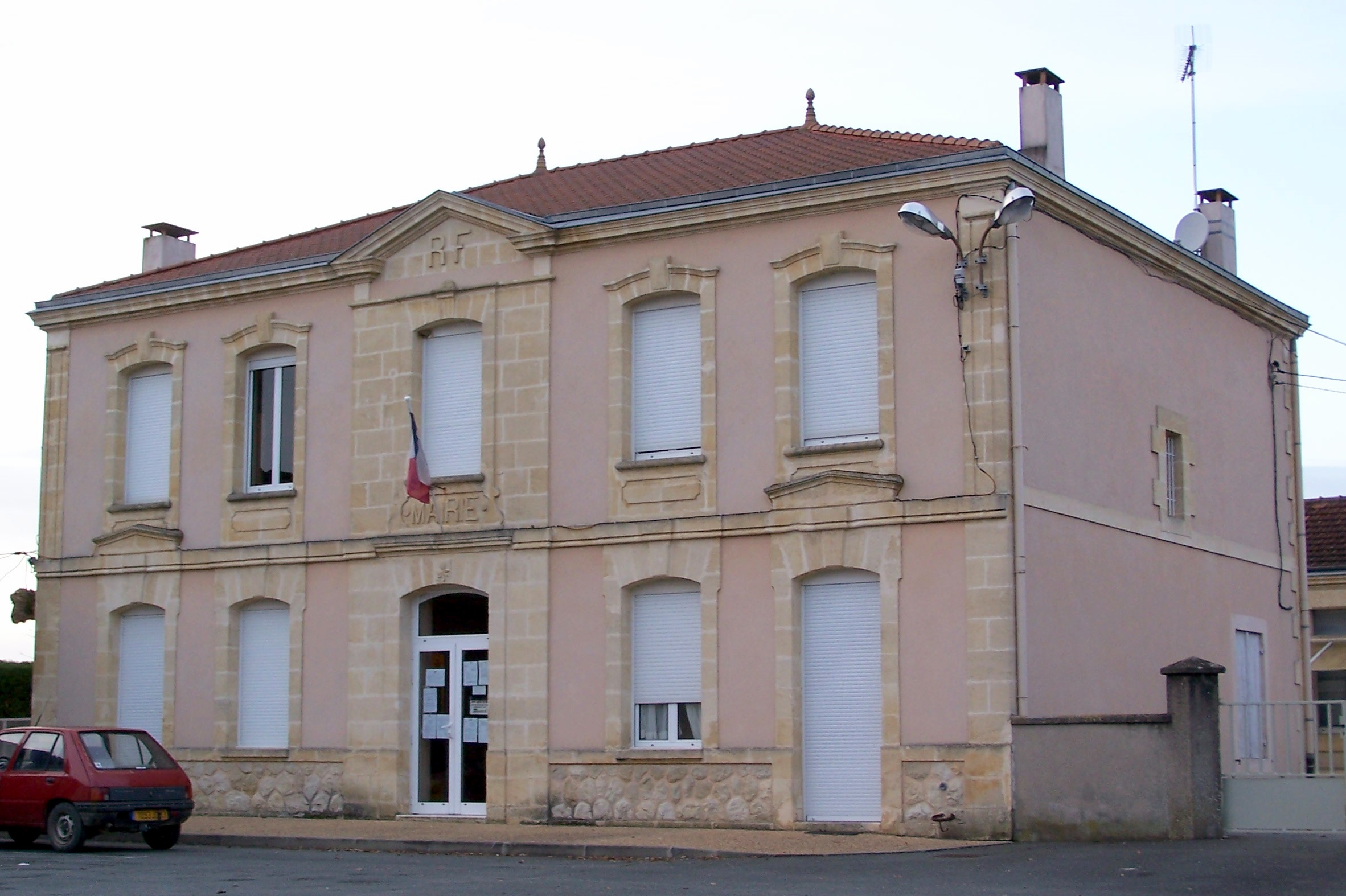
- Town hall
- Location of Saint-Laurent-du-Bois
- Location within France Location within Nouvelle-Aquitaine
- Coordinates: 44°38′11″N 0°08′03″W
- Country: France
- Region: Nouvelle-Aquitaine
- Department: Gironde
- Arrondissement: Langon
- Canton: L'Entre-Deux-Mers

Government
  - Mayor (2020–2026): Colin Sheriffs
- Area^{1}: 7.41 km^{2} (2.86 sq mi)
- Elevation: 87 m (285 ft)
- Highest elevation: 97 m (318 ft)
- Lowest elevation: 37 m (121 ft)
- Population (2023): 263
  - Density: 35.5/km^{2} (91.9/sq mi)
- Time zone: UTC+01:00 (CET)
  - Summer (DST): UTC+02:00 (CEST)
- INSEE/Postal code: 33427 /33540
- ^{1} French Land Register data, which excludes lakes, ponds, glaciers > 1 km^{2} (0.386 sq mi or 247 acres) and river estuaries.

Saint-Laurent-du-Bois (French pronunciation: [sɛ̃ lɔʁɑ̃ dy bwa]; Gascon: Sent Laurenç deu Bòsc) is a commune in the Gironde department in Nouvelle-Aquitaine in southwestern France.

== Population ==
Historical population
Year	Pop.	±% p.a.
1968	272	—
1975	236	−2.01%
1982	205	−1.99%
1990	216	+0.66%
1999	216	+0.00%
2007	227	+0.62%
2012	245	+1.54%
2017	250	+0.40%
2023	263	+0.85%
Source: INSEE

== See also ==
- Communes of the Gironde department
