= Saint-Pierre-de-Bat =

- Commune
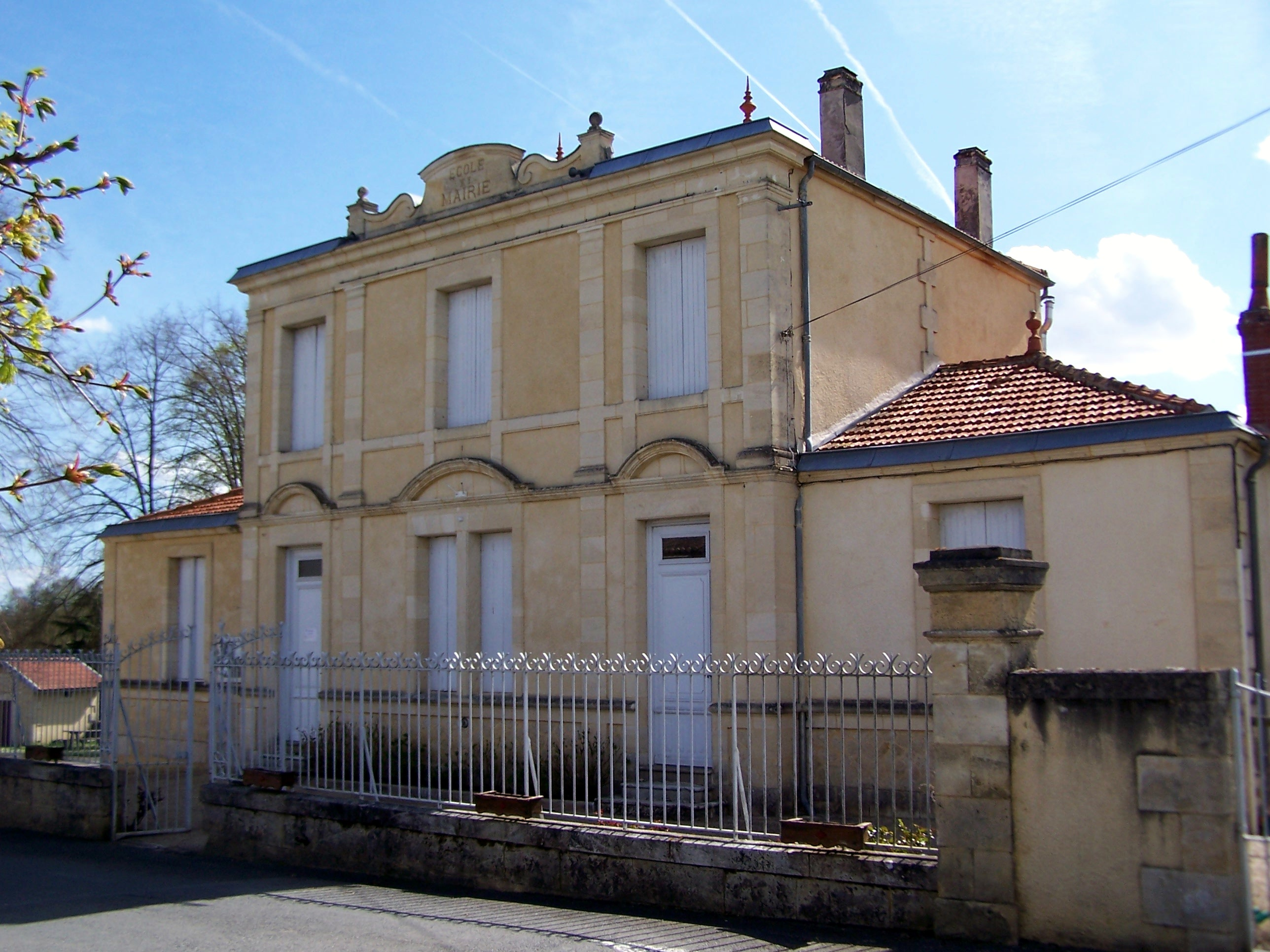
- Town hall
- Location of Saint-Pierre-de-Bat
- Location within France Location within Nouvelle-Aquitaine
- Coordinates: 44°40′24″N 0°13′54″W
- Country: France
- Region: Nouvelle-Aquitaine
- Department: Gironde
- Arrondissement: Langon
- Canton: L'Entre-Deux-Mers

Government
  - Mayor (2020–2026): Olivier Mehats
- Area^{1}: 8.96 km^{2} (3.46 sq mi)
- Elevation: 40 m (130 ft)
- Population (2023): 281
  - Density: 31.4/km^{2} (81.2/sq mi)
- Time zone: UTC+01:00 (CET)
  - Summer (DST): UTC+02:00 (CEST)
- INSEE/Postal code: 33464 /33760
- ^{1} French Land Register data, which excludes lakes, ponds, glaciers > 1 km^{2} (0.386 sq mi or 247 acres) and river estuaries.

Saint-Pierre-de-Bat (Gascon: Sent Pèir de Vaths) is a commune in the Gironde department in Nouvelle-Aquitaine in southwestern France.

== Population ==
Historical population
| Year | Pop. | ±% p.a. |
|---|---|---|
| 1968 | 256 | — |
| 1975 | 253 | −0.17% |
| 1982 | 264 | +0.61% |
| 1990 | 251 | −0.63% |
| 1999 | 271 | +0.86% |
| 2007 | 306 | +1.53% |
| 2012 | 313 | +0.45% |
| 2017 | 308 | −0.32% |
| 2023 | 281 | −1.52% |
Source: INSEE

== See also ==
- Communes of the Gironde department
