= Courpiac =

- Commune
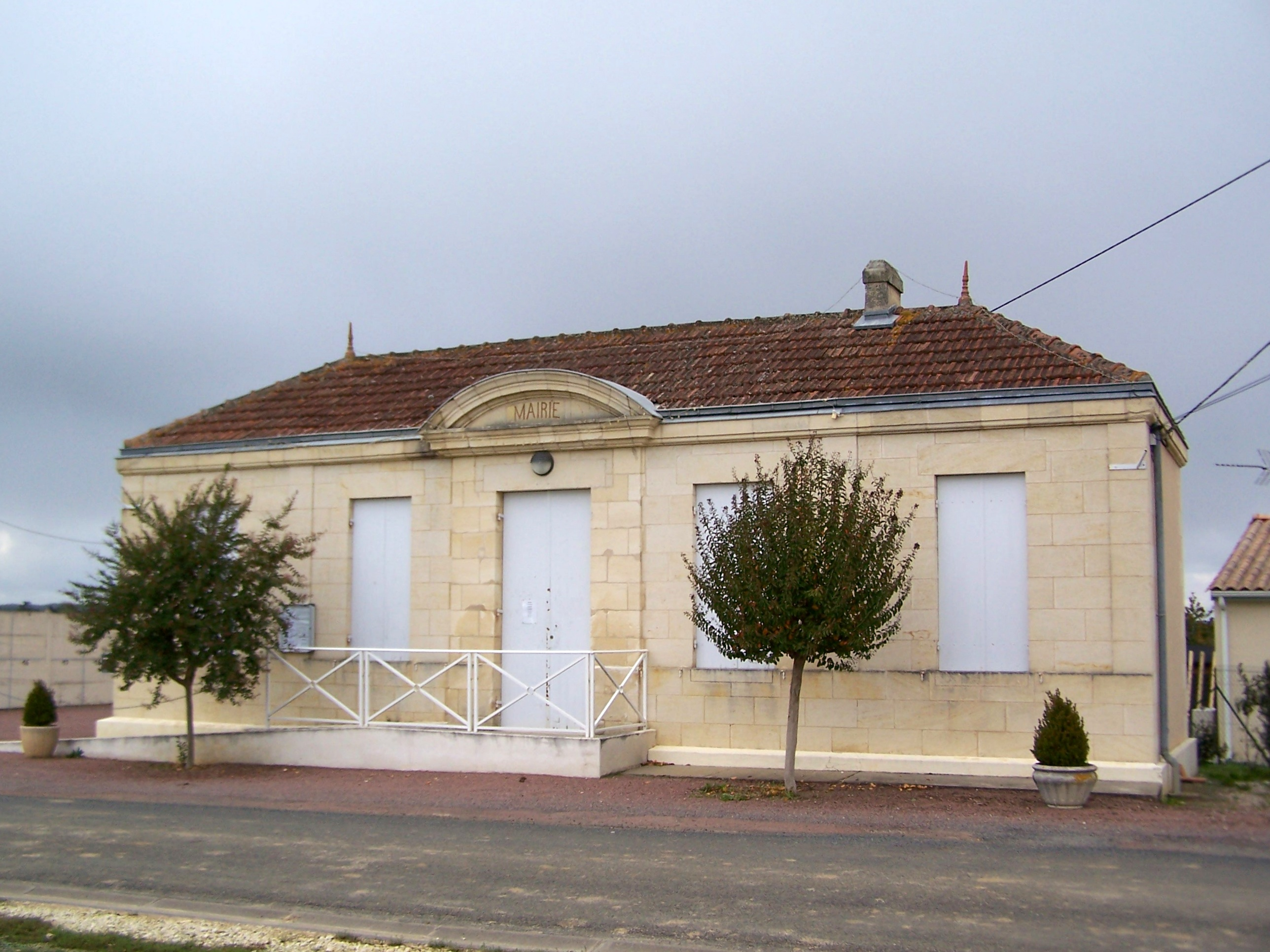
- Town hall
- Location of Courpiac
- Location within France Location within Nouvelle-Aquitaine
- Coordinates: 44°45′21″N 0°10′52″W
- Country: France
- Region: Nouvelle-Aquitaine
- Department: Gironde
- Arrondissement: Langon
- Canton: L'Entre-Deux-Mers

Government
  - Mayor (2020–2026): Thomas Solans
- Area^{1}: 2.21 km^{2} (0.85 sq mi)
- Elevation: 64 m (210 ft)
- Highest elevation: 72 m (236 ft)
- Lowest elevation: 17 m (56 ft)
- Population (2023): 121
  - Density: 54.8/km^{2} (142/sq mi)
- Time zone: UTC+01:00 (CET)
  - Summer (DST): UTC+02:00 (CEST)
- INSEE/Postal code: 33135 /33760
- ^{1} French Land Register data, which excludes lakes, ponds, glaciers > 1 km^{2} (0.386 sq mi or 247 acres) and river estuaries.

Courpiac (French pronunciation: [kuʁpjak]; Gascon: Corpiac) is a commune in the Gironde department in Nouvelle-Aquitaine in southwestern France.

== Population ==
Historical population
Year	Pop.	±% p.a.
1968	84	—
1975	88	+0.67%
1982	83	−0.83%
1990	93	+1.43%
1999	101	+0.92%
2007	87	−1.85%
2012	119	+6.46%
2017	125	+0.99%
2023	121	−0.54%
Source: INSEE

== See also ==
- Communes of the Gironde department
