= Villenave-de-Rions =

- Commune
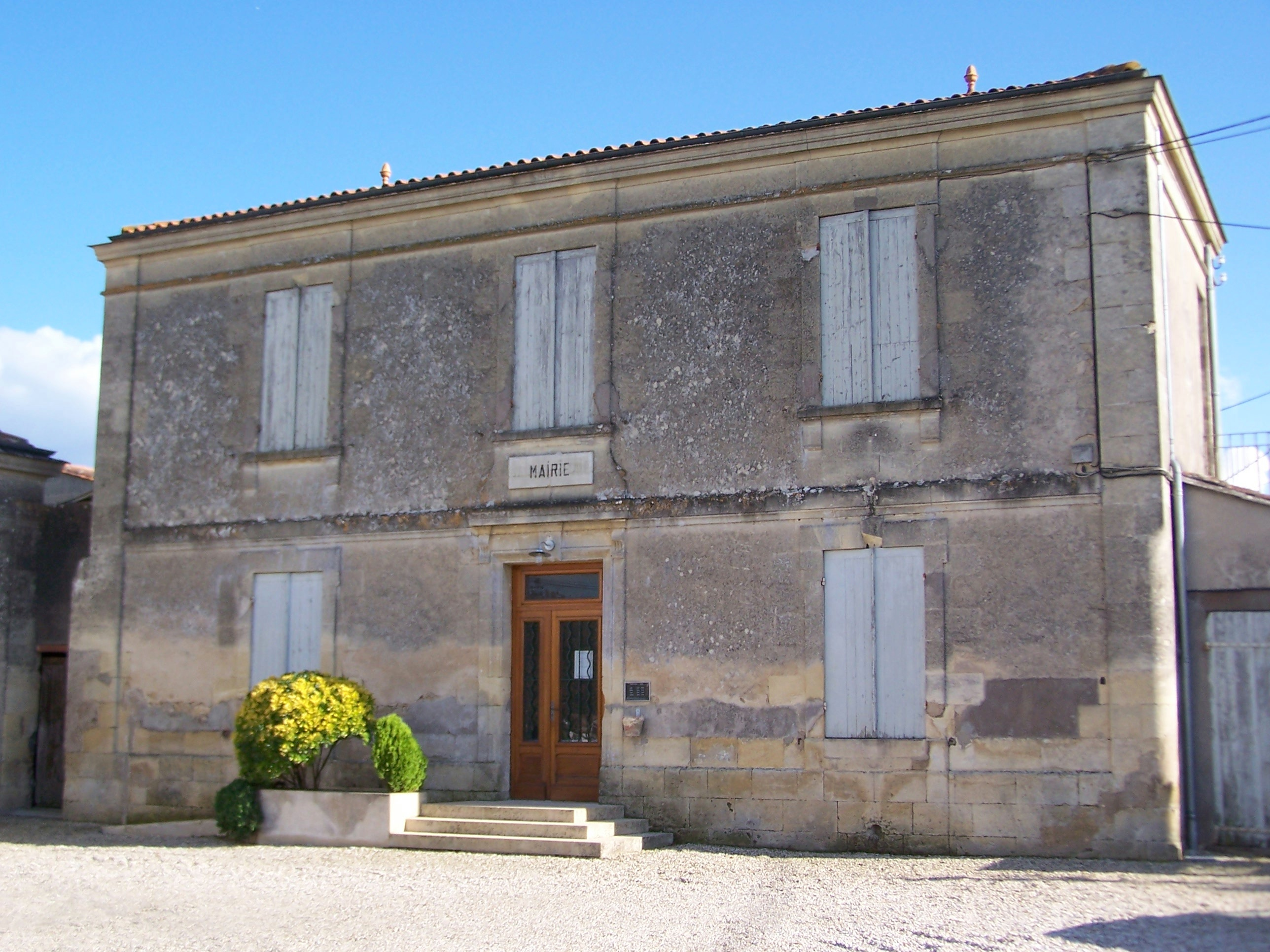
- The town hall in Villenave-de-Rions

- Coat of arms
- Location of Villenave-de-Rions
- Location within France Location within Nouvelle-Aquitaine
- Coordinates: 44°41′27″N 0°20′12″W
- Country: France
- Region: Nouvelle-Aquitaine
- Department: Gironde
- Arrondissement: Langon
- Canton: L'Entre-Deux-Mers

Government
  - Mayor (2020–2026): Jean-Marc Subervie
- Area^{1}: 2.56 km^{2} (0.99 sq mi)
- Elevation: 102 m (335 ft)
- Highest elevation: 103 m (338 ft)
- Lowest elevation: 14 m (46 ft)
- Population (2023): 374
  - Density: 146/km^{2} (378/sq mi)
- Time zone: UTC+01:00 (CET)
  - Summer (DST): UTC+02:00 (CEST)
- INSEE/Postal code: 33549 /33550
- ^{1} French Land Register data, which excludes lakes, ponds, glaciers > 1 km^{2} (0.386 sq mi or 247 acres) and river estuaries.

Villenave-de-Rions (Occitan: Villenave de Rire) is a commune in the Gironde department in Nouvelle-Aquitaine in southwestern France.

== Population ==
Historical population
Year	Pop.	±% p.a.
1968	252	—
1975	216	−2.18%
1982	261	+2.74%
1990	286	+1.15%
1999	274	−0.48%
2007	271	−0.14%
2012	331	+4.08%
2017	317	−0.86%
2023	374	+2.79%
Source: INSEE

== See also ==
- Communes of the Gironde department
