= Canton of L'Entre-Deux-Mers =

Coordinates: 44.64°N 0.31°W

The canton of L'Entre-Deux-Mers is an administrative division of the Gironde department, southwestern France. It was created at the French canton reorganisation which came into effect in March 2015. Its seat is in Cadillac.

It consists of the following communes:

1. Baigneaux
2. Béguey
3. Bellebat
4. Bellefond
5. Blésignac
6. Cadillac
7. Capian
8. Cardan
9. Caudrot
10. Cessac
11. Coirac
12. Courpiac
13. Donzac
14. Escoussans
15. Faleyras
16. Frontenac
17. Gabarnac
18. Gornac
19. Haux
20. Ladaux
21. Langoiran
22. Laroque
23. Lestiac-sur-Garonne
24. Loupiac
25. Lugasson
26. Martres
27. Monprimblanc
28. Montignac
29. Mourens
30. Omet
31. Paillet
32. Le Pian-sur-Garonne
33. Porte-de-Benauge
34. Rions
35. Romagne
36. Saint-André-du-Bois
37. Sainte-Croix-du-Mont
38. Sainte-Foy-la-Longue
39. Saint-Germain-de-Grave
40. Saint-Laurent-du-Bois
41. Saint-Laurent-du-Plan
42. Saint-Léon
43. Saint-Macaire
44. Saint-Maixant
45. Saint-Martial
46. Saint-Martin-de-Sescas
47. Saint-Pierre-d'Aurillac
48. Saint-Pierre-de-Bat
49. La Sauve
50. Semens
51. Soulignac
52. Tabanac
53. Targon
54. Le Tourne
55. Verdelais
56. Villenave-de-Rions
