= List of windmills in Gironde =

A list of windmills in Gironde, France.

Location	Name of mill	Type	Built	Notes	Photograph
Aillas		Moulin tour			
Ambarès-et-Lagrave	Moulin de la Mouline				
Arbis	Moulin du Château de Benauge	Moulin Pivot			
Bayon-sur-Gironde		Moulin Tour			
Beaupied	Moulin de Beaupied	Moulin Tour		Moulins-a-Vent (in French)	
Béguey	Moulin des Graves	Moulin Tour	18th century	Moulins-a-Vent (in French)	
Blaignan	Moulin de Courrian	Moulin Tour		Moulins-a-Vent (in French)	
Blanquefort	Moulin de Grattequina	Moulin Tour			
Blasimon	Moulin de Blasimon	Moulin Tour		Moulins-a-Vent (in French)	
Bonzac	Town hall	Moulin Tour			
Bourg	Moulin de Bourg sur Gironde	Moulin Tour		Moulins-a-Vent (in French)	
Capian	Moulin du Télégraphe	Moulin Tour		Moulins-a-Vent (in French)	
Capian	Moulin Mandis	Moulin Tour	18th century	Moulins-a-Vent (in French)	
Capian	Moulin Piras	Moulin Tour	18th century	Moulins-a-Vent (in French)	
Capian	Moulin Lacroy	Moulin Tour	18th century	Moulins-a-Vent (in French)	
Carbon-Blanc	Moulin de Belle Vue				
Carcans		Moulin Tour			
Castets et Castillon	Moulin de Castéra	Moulin Tour			
Castillon-de-Castets	Moulin de Landry				
Castres-sur-Gironde	Moulin de la Pommarède				
Comps	Moulin de Lambert	Moulin Tour		Moulins-a-Vent (in French)	
Créon	Moulin de Cosse Rouge				
Doulezon	Moulin de Marchemal; Moulin de la Croupette	Moulin Tour		Moulins-a-Vent (in French)	
Fargues-Saint-Hilaire	Moulin du Domaine				
Gabarnac	Moulin de Faugas	Moulin Tour			
Gabarnac	Moulin de Balan	Moulin Tour	1746	Moulins-a-Vent (in French)	
Gauriac	Moulin de Gauriac	Moulin Tour		Moulins-a-Vent (in French)	
Gensac	Moulin Gensac				
Gensac	Moulin de Val d'Enfer		Moulin tour		
Gornac	Moulin de Haut Benauge; Moulin de Gonin	Moulin Tour		Moulins-a-Vent (in French)	
Gujan-Mestras	Moulin de Gujan-Mestras #1	Moulin Tour	1808	Moulins-a-Vent (in French)	
Gujan-Mestras	Moulin de Gujan-Mestras #2	Moulin Tour		Moulins-a-Vent (in French)	
Haux	Moulin Colin	Moulin Tour		Moulins-a-Vent (in French)	
Haux	Moulin des Faures	Moulin Tour		Moulins-a-Vent (in French)	
Hure		Moulin Tour			
Lansac	Moulin du Grand Puy	Moulin Tour	1820	Moulins-a-Vent (in French)	
La Réole	(two mills)	Moulin Tour			
La Teste-de-Buch	Moulin de Bordes	Moulin Tour		Moulins-a-Vent (in French)	
Le Porge		Moulin Tour			
Lestiac-sur-Garonne	Moulin de Pasquier	Moulin Tour	18th century	Moulins-a-Vent (in French)	
Le Teich	Moulin Le Teich	Moulin Tour		Moulins-a-Vent (in French)	
Montagne Saint Emilion	Moulin de Calon #1	Moulin Tour	15th century	Moulins-a-Vent (in French)	
Montagne Saint Emilion	Moulin de Calon #2	Moulin Tour	15th century	Moulins-a-Vent (in French)	
Montagne Saint Emilion	Moulin de Calon #3	Moulin Tour	15th century	Moulins-a-Vent (in French)	
Montagne Saint Emilion	Moulin de Calon #4	Moulin Tour	15th century	Moulins-a-Vent (in French)	
Montagne Saint Emilion	Moulin de Calon #5	Moulin Tour	15th century	Moulins-a-Vent (in French)	
Néac	Moulin Neac				
Omet	Moulin de la Bertrande	Moulin Tour		Moulins-a-Vent (in French)	
Périssac	Moulin de Courrières	Moulin Tour		Moulins-a-Vent (in French)	
Puisseguin	Moulin de Puisseguin				
Saint-André-de-Cubzac	Moulin de Montalon #1	Moulin Tour		Moulins-a-Vent (in French)	
Saint-André-de-Cubzac	Moulin de Montalon #2	Moulin Tour		Moulins-a-Vent (in French)	
Saint-André-et-Appelles		Moulin Tour			
Saint-Aubin-de-Branne	Moulin de Thomas	Moulin Tour		Moulins-a-Vent (in French)	
Saint-Félix-de-Foncaude		Moulin Tour			
Saint-Genès-de-Castillon	Moulin de St. Genès de Castillon				
Saint-Pey-de-Castets	Moulin de Tuscat	Moulin Tour		Moulins-a-Vent (in French)	
Saint-Pey-de-Castets	Moulin de Lorgère	Moulin Tour		Moulins-a-Vent (in French)	
Saint-Pey-de-Castets	Moulin de Brugnac	Moulin Tour		Moulins-a-Vent (in French)	
Saint-Philippe-d'Aiguille	Moulin a Saint-Phillipe d'Aiguille	Moulin Tour		Moulins-a-Vent (in French)	
Saint-Seurin-de-Cursac	Moulin de la Garde de Roland				
Saint-Trojan	Moulin de Novarre	Moulin Tour		Moulins-a-Vent (in French)	
Sainte-Radegonde	Moulin de Sainte Radegonde				
Soulignac	Moulin du Biot	Moulin Tour		Moulins-a-Vent (in French)	
Targon	Moulin de Targon	Moulin Tour		Moulins-a-Vent (in French)	
Vensac	Moulin de Vensac	Moulin Tour	18th century	Moulins-a-Vent (in French)	
Verdelais	Moulin de Cussol	Moulin Tour	18th century	Moulins-a-Vent (in French)	
Verdelais	Moulin Vinicole	Moulin Tour		Moulins-a-Vent (in French)	
Vertheuil	Moulin de Gouat	Moulin Tour		Moulins-a-Vent (in French)	
Villeneuve de Blaye	Moulin Pinaud	Moulin Tour		Moulins a Vent (in French)	
Villeneuve de Blaye	Moulin de Bidou	Moulin Tour		Moulins a Vent (in French)	
