= Philippe Dubourg =

French politician (1938–2021)

Mayor of Illats
- In office 1977 – 11 April 2021

Member of the National Assembly of France
- In office 19 June 2002 – 19 June 2007
- Preceded by: Odette Trupin
- Succeeded by: Martine Faure
- Constituency: Gironde's 9th constituency
- In office 2 April 1993 – 21 April 1997
- Preceded by: Pierre Lagorce
- Succeeded by: Odette Trupin
- Constituency: Gironde's 9th constituency

Personal details
- Born: 9 July 1938 Caudéran, Bordeaux, France
- Died: 11 April 2021 (aged 82) Bruges, France
- Party: RPR; UMP; LR
- Occupation: Dentist

Philippe Dubourg (French pronunciation: [filip dybuʁ]; 9 July 1938 – 11 April 2021) was a French politician. He served as Mayor of Illats from 1977 to 2021 and represented Gironde's 9th constituency in the National Assembly from 1993 to 1997 and again from 2002 to 2007.
