= Sophie Mette =

French politician

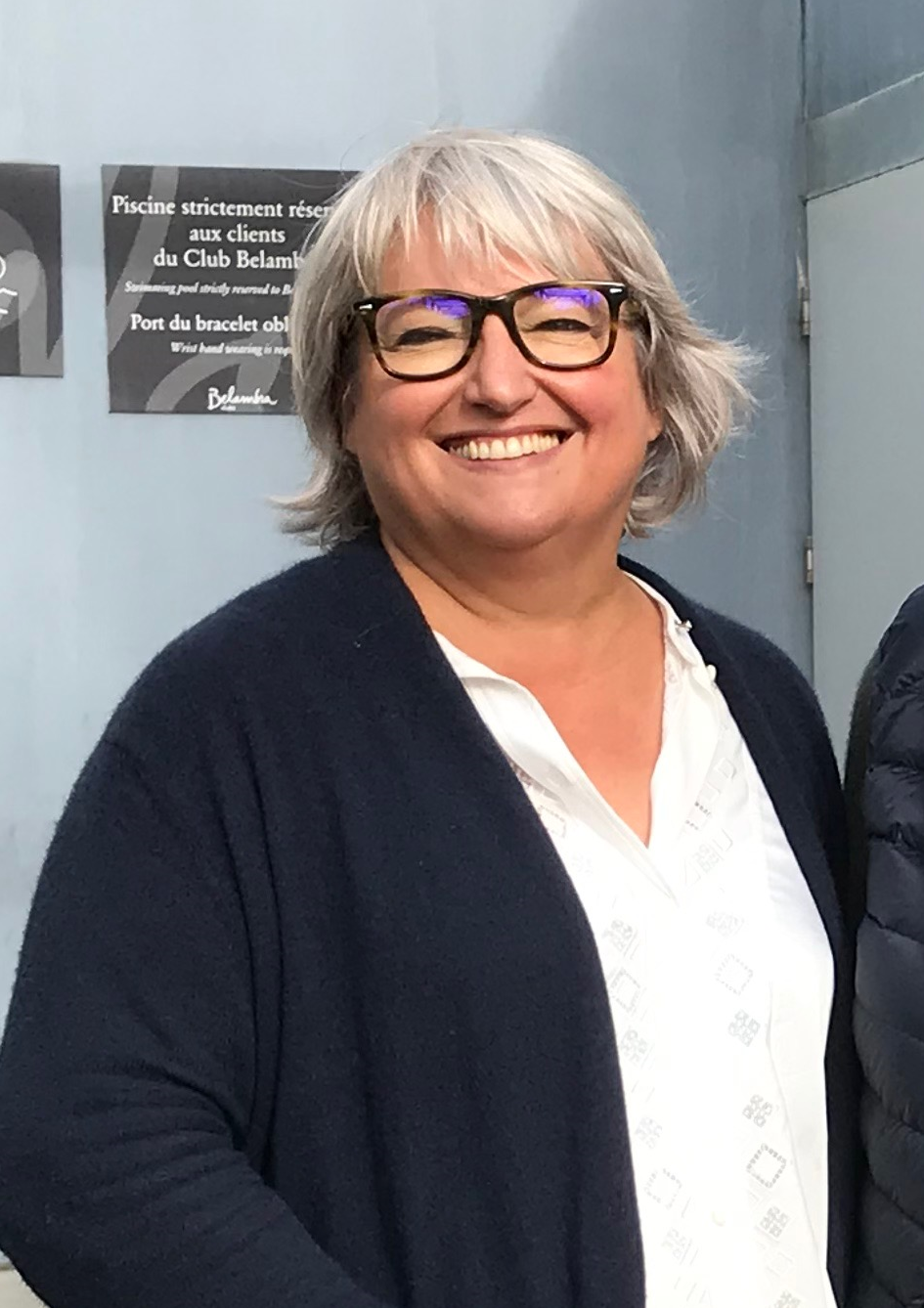

Member of the National Assembly for Gironde's 9th constituency
- Incumbent
- Assumed office 18 June 2007
- Preceded by: Gilles Savary

Personal details
- Born: 13 September 1959 (age 66) Montauban, France
- Party: MoDem (since 2007)

Sophie Mette (born 13 September 1959) is a French politician of the Democratic Movement (MoDem) who has been a member of the National Assembly since 18 June 2017, representing the department of Gironde.

== Political career ==
Having moved to Bazas commune in 1987, Mette was elected as a councilor for the commune in 2001 with the Miscellaneous right.

Mette competed in the 2007 French parliamentary election with the Union for French Democracy. For the 2008 municipal elections, she left the right and joined the left, where she would remain as a re-elected as councilor until 2014. In the 2010 regional elections, she joined MoDem, and then joined the En Marche!-MoDem coalition in 2017.

Mette currently holds a position in the Bureau of the Nation Assembly as a secretary, under the leadership of its President Richard Ferrand. She is also a member of the Committee on Cultural Affairs and Education.
