= Gironde's 12th constituency =

Constituency of the French Fifth Republic

12th constituency of Gironde
- inline Constituency of the National Assembly of France

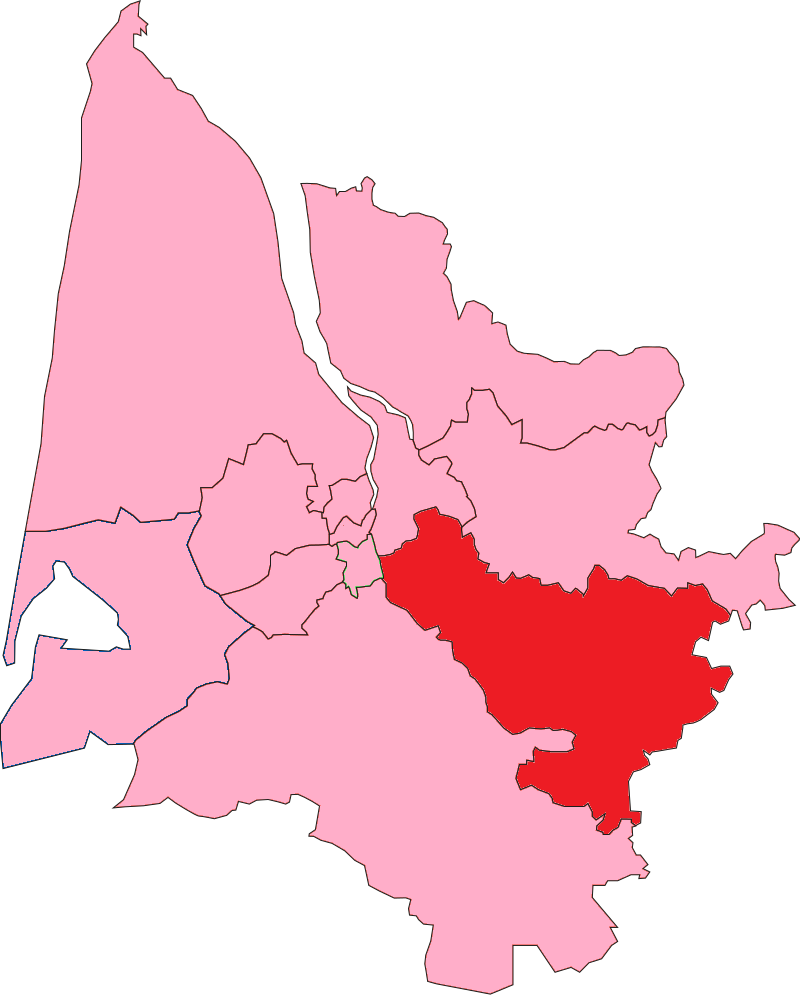
- Gironde's 12th Constituency shown within Gironde

- Location of Gironde in France
- Deputy: Mathilde Feld; LFI
- Department: Gironde
- Cantons: (pre-2015) Auros, Cadillac, Créon, Monségur, Pellegrue, La Réole, Saint-Macaire, Sauveterre-de-Guyenne, Targon.
- Registered voters: 83,360

The 12th constituency of the Gironde (French: Douzième circonscription de la Gironde) is a French legislative constituency in the Gironde département. Like the other 576 French constituencies, it elects one MP using the two-round system, with a run-off if no candidate receives over 50% of the vote in the first round.

== Description ==
The 12th constituency of the Gironde lies in the east of the department. It was created as a result of the 2010 redistricting of French legislative constituencies which awarded an additional seat to Gironde. The seat was initially held by Martine Faure of the Socialist Party who had previously represented Gironde's 9th constituency. She was, however, defeated in the En Marche! landslide in 2017 along with all but one of her Socialist Party colleagues in Gironde.

== Assembly Members ==
Election	Member	Party
2012	Martine Faure	PS
2017	Christelle Dubos	LREM
2018	Pascal Lavergne	LREM
2020	Christelle Dubos	LREM
2022	Pascal Lavergne	RE
2024	Mathilde Feld	LFI

== Election results ==
=== 2024 ===
Candidate	Party	Alliance	First round			Second round		
Candidate	Party	Alliance	Votes	%	+/–	Votes	%	+/–
Rémy Berthonneau	RN		24,016	38.41	+18.13	28,034	49.58	new
Mathilde Feld	LFI	NFP	18,042	28.85	+1.91	28,514	50.42	+0.65
Pascal Lavergne	REN	Ensemble	17,270	27.62	-3.04			
Gabriel Landete	DIV		2,180	3.49	new			
Richard Lavin	LO		1,021	1.63	+0.73			
Votes			62,529	100.00		56,548	100.00	
Valid votes			62,529	96.91	-1.09	56,548	88.46	-1.41
Blank votes			1,413	2.19	+0.79	5,636	8.82	+2.03
Null votes			580	0.90	+0.30	1,743	2.73	-0.60
Turnout			64,522	72.41	+18.87	63,927	71.72	+20.53
Abstentions			24,589	27.59	-18.87	25,209	28.28	-20.53
Registered voters			89,111			89,136		
Result			LFI GAIN FROM RE					

=== 2022 ===
Legislative Election 2022: Gironde's 12th constituency
Party	Candidate	Votes	%	±%
LFI (NUPÉS)	Mathilde Feld	12,455	26.91	-3.15
LREM (Ensemble)	Pascal Lavergne	11,366	24.55	-12.89
RN	Hager Jacquemin	9,375	20.25	+6.87
PS	Bruno Marty*	4,494	9.71	N/A
LMR	Yves D'Amecourt	2,882	6.23	N/A
LR (UDC)	Bastien Mercier	2,101	4.54	−10.16
REC	François-Xavier Marques	1,908	4.12	N/A
Others	N/A	1,708	3.69	
Turnout		46,238	53.54	−0.36
2nd round result
LREM (Ensemble)	Pascal Lavergne	20,365	50.23	-6.48
LFI (NUPÉS)	Mathilde Feld	20,181	49.77	+6.48
Turnout		40,546	51.19	+4.92
LREM hold				

* PS dissident

=== 2017 ===
Candidate	Label	First round		Second round	
Candidate	Label	Votes	%	Votes	%
Christelle Dubos	REM	16,426	37.44	19,670	56.71
Christophe Miqueu	FI	7,191	16.39	15,018	43.29
Yves D'Amecourt	LR	6,449	14.70		
Patrick Duval-Campana	FN	5,868	13.38		
Anne-Laure Fabre-Nadler	ECO	3,016	6.87		
Catherine Veyssy	PS	2,983	6.80		
Alexis Febbrari	DLF	682	1.55		
Richard Lavin	EXG	357	0.81		
Jean-Claude Morin	DVD	313	0.71		
Benoît Lamothe	DIV	312	0.71		
Catherine Largeteau	DVG	273	0.62		
Votes		43,870	100.00	34,688	100.00
Valid votes		43,870	97.64	34,688	89.95
Blank votes		716	1.59	2,523	6.54
Null votes		344	0.77	1,354	3.51
Turnout		44,930	53.90	38,565	46.27
Abstentions		38,430	46.10	44,777	53.73
Registered voters		83,360		83,342	
Source: Ministry of the Interior

=== 2012 ===
2012 legislative election in Gironde's 12nd constituency
Candidate	Party	First round		Second round	
Candidate	Party	Votes	%	Votes	%
Martine Faure	PS	21,145	43.73%	27,674	60.53%
Yves D'Amecourt	UMP	13,572	28.07%	18,048	39.47%
Gonzague Malherbe	FN	5,700	11.79%		
Michel Hilaire	FG	3,811	7.88%		
Dominique Jobard	EELV	1,495	3.09%		
Frédéric Lataste	PR	1,267	2.62%		
Marie-Pierre Fougeret	AEI	382	0.79%		
Marie-Ange Lorblancher	PCD	330	0.68%		
Laurent Delage	NPA	277	0.57%		
Françoise Dautun	DLR	228	0.47%		
Zina Ahmimou	LO	151	0.31%		
Valid votes		48,358	98.44%	45,722	96.78%
Spoilt and null votes		764	1.56%	1,523	3.22%
Votes cast / turnout		49,122	62.50%	47,245	60.07%
Abstentions		29,477	37.50%	31,399	39.93%
Registered voters		78,599	100.00%	78,644	100.00%
