= Martine Faure =

French politician (born 1948)

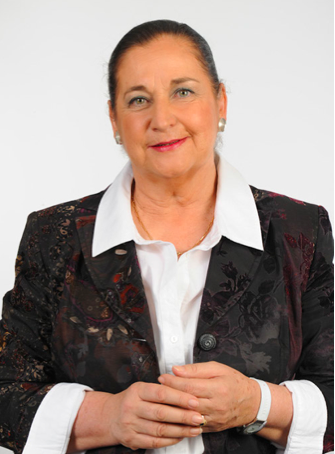
- Portrait of Martine Faure

Member of the National Assembly for Gironde's 12th constituency
- In office 20 June 2012 – 20 June 2017
- Preceded by: New constituency
- Succeeded by: Christelle Dubos

Personal details
- Born: 30 September 1948 (age 77) Langon, France
- Party: Socialist Party
- Profession: Teacher

Martine Faure (born 30 September 1948) was a member of the National Assembly of France. She represented the Gironde department, as a member of the Socialist Party. She was the deputy for Gironde's 9th constituency from 2007 to 2012 and, after the 2010 redistricting, the 12th constituency from 2012 to 2017.

She was a member of the Commission of culture and education.

== Biography ==
Martine Faure grew up in Aillas in a farming family. Initially a local councillor in Aillas, at the age of 35 she became a municipal councillor in Langon. As Deputy Mayor (1983), she worked in the cultural field for nearly nine years.

She is a retired teacher.

In 1998, she was elected to the cantonal council of Auros. She set up the network of communes of the Pays d'Auros and became its first chair. Martine Faure was Vice President of the General Council of Gironde, with responsibility for culture and environment until 2008.

On 17 June 2007, she defeated the incumbent Assembly member Philippe Dubourg to win election for the 9th district of the Gironde region. Her substitute member is Jean-Marie Darmian (Mayor of Creon).

Martine Faure is a member of the Socialist and Radical group and a member of the Committee on Cultural, Family and Social Affairs. She is a member of the Socialist Party. She is a member of the current Rassembler à gauche grouping ("Gathering on the left") which brings together followers of Laurent Fabius.

On 28 February 2013, The Commission des affaires culturelles et de l’éducation, of which Faure is part, voted in favour of an amendment proposed by her, and favoured by Yves Durand, Martine Martinel and Marie-George Buffet among others, to replace, in the national elementary curriculum, the biological concept of "sex" with the concept of "gender" to include a social dimension. The elementary curriculum was successfully revised in September 2013 under the name "l'ABCD de l'egalite".
