= Porte-de-Benauge =

- Commune
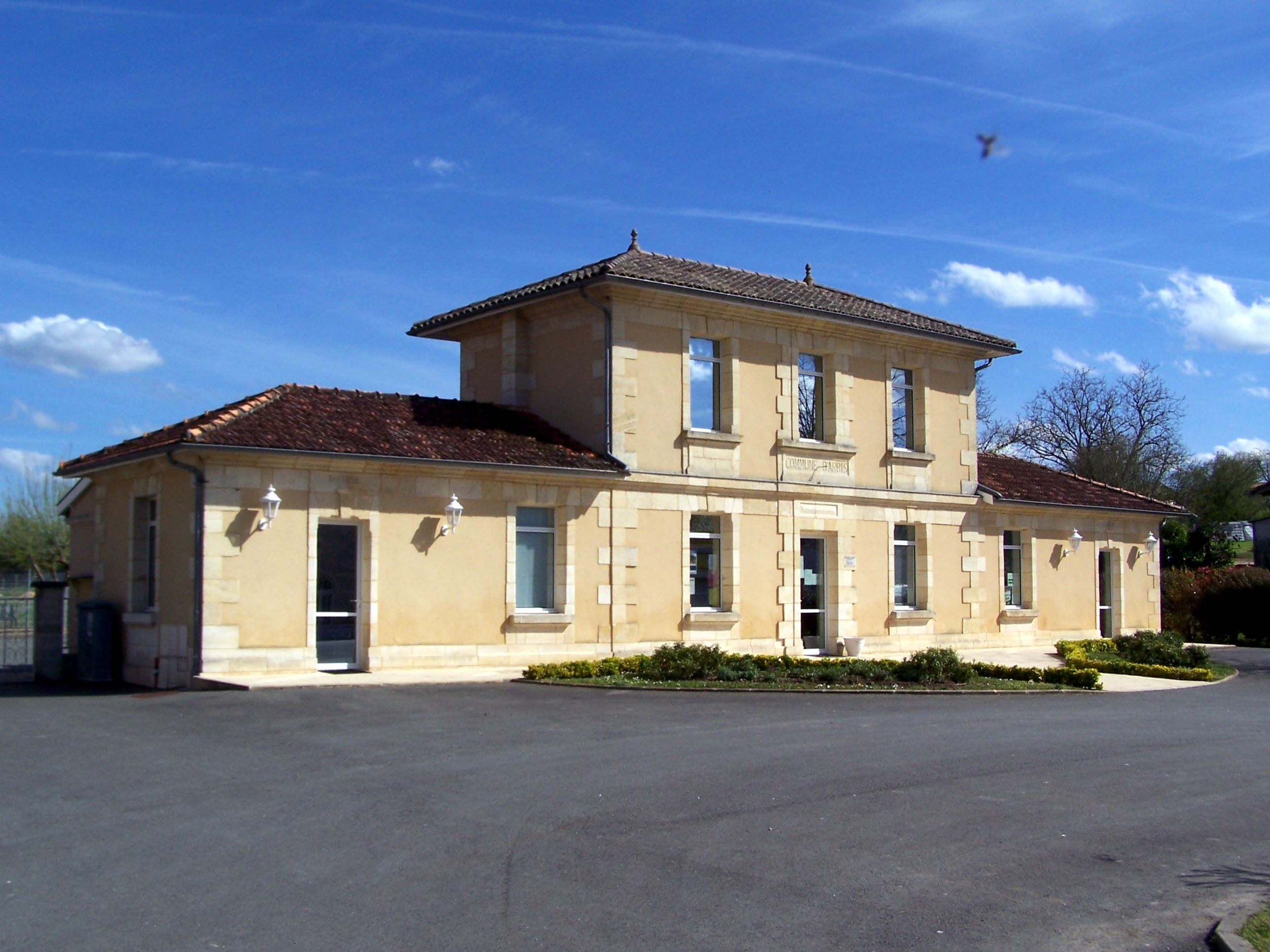
- The town hall in Arbis
- Location of Porte-de-Benauge
- Location within France Location within Nouvelle-Aquitaine
- Coordinates: 44°40′46″N 0°14′41″W
- Country: France
- Region: Nouvelle-Aquitaine
- Department: Gironde
- Arrondissement: Langon
- Canton: L'Entre-Deux-Mers
- Intercommunality: CC rurales de l'Entre-Deux-Mers

Government
  - Mayor (2025–2026): Éric Guerin
- Area^{1}: 19.08 km^{2} (7.37 sq mi)
- Highest elevation: 107 m (351 ft)
- Lowest elevation: 23 m (75 ft)
- Population (2023): 602
  - Density: 31.6/km^{2} (81.7/sq mi)
- Time zone: UTC+01:00 (CET)
  - Summer (DST): UTC+02:00 (CEST)
- INSEE/Postal code: 33008 /33760
- ^{1} French Land Register data, which excludes lakes, ponds, glaciers > 1 km^{2} (0.386 sq mi or 247 acres) and river estuaries.

Porte-de-Benauge (Gascon: Pòrta de Benauja) is a commune in the Gironde department in southwestern France. It was established on 1 January 2019 by merger of the former communes of Arbis (the seat) and Cantois. On 1 January 2025, the former commune of Saint-Genis-du-Bois was merged into Porte-de-Benauge.

== See also ==
- Communes of the Gironde department
