= Mathilde Feld =

French politician and member of parliament

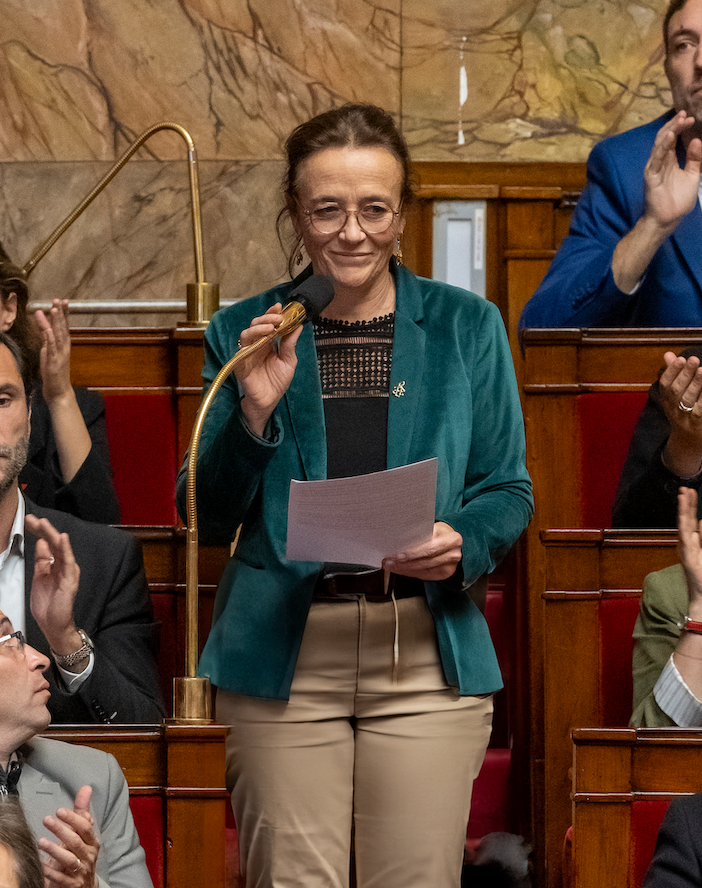
- Mathilde Feld at the National Assembly

Member of the National Assembly for Gironde's 12th constituency
- Incumbent
- Assumed office 8 July 2024
- Preceded by: Pascal Lavergne

Personal details
- Born: 28 April 1969 (age 56) Rueil-Malmaison, Paris, France
- Party: La France Insoumise

Mathilde Feld (born 28 April 1969) is a French politician from La France Insoumise. She was elected a member of parliament in the 2024 French legislative election.

== Political career ==
She was president of the Créonnais community of communes from 2014 to 2020.

Mathilde Feld was a candidate for the first time in the 2022 French legislative election in the Gironde's 12th constituency. She was beaten by 184 votes by the En Marche candidate Pascal Lavergne.

In the 2024 French legislative election, she was elected in the second round against the National Rally candidate Rémy Berthonneau. The outgoing MP Pascal Lavergne had withdrawn after the first round avoiding a triangular election run-off to block the extreme right.

== See also ==
- List of deputies of the 17th National Assembly of France
