= Cantois =

- Part of Porte-de-Benauge
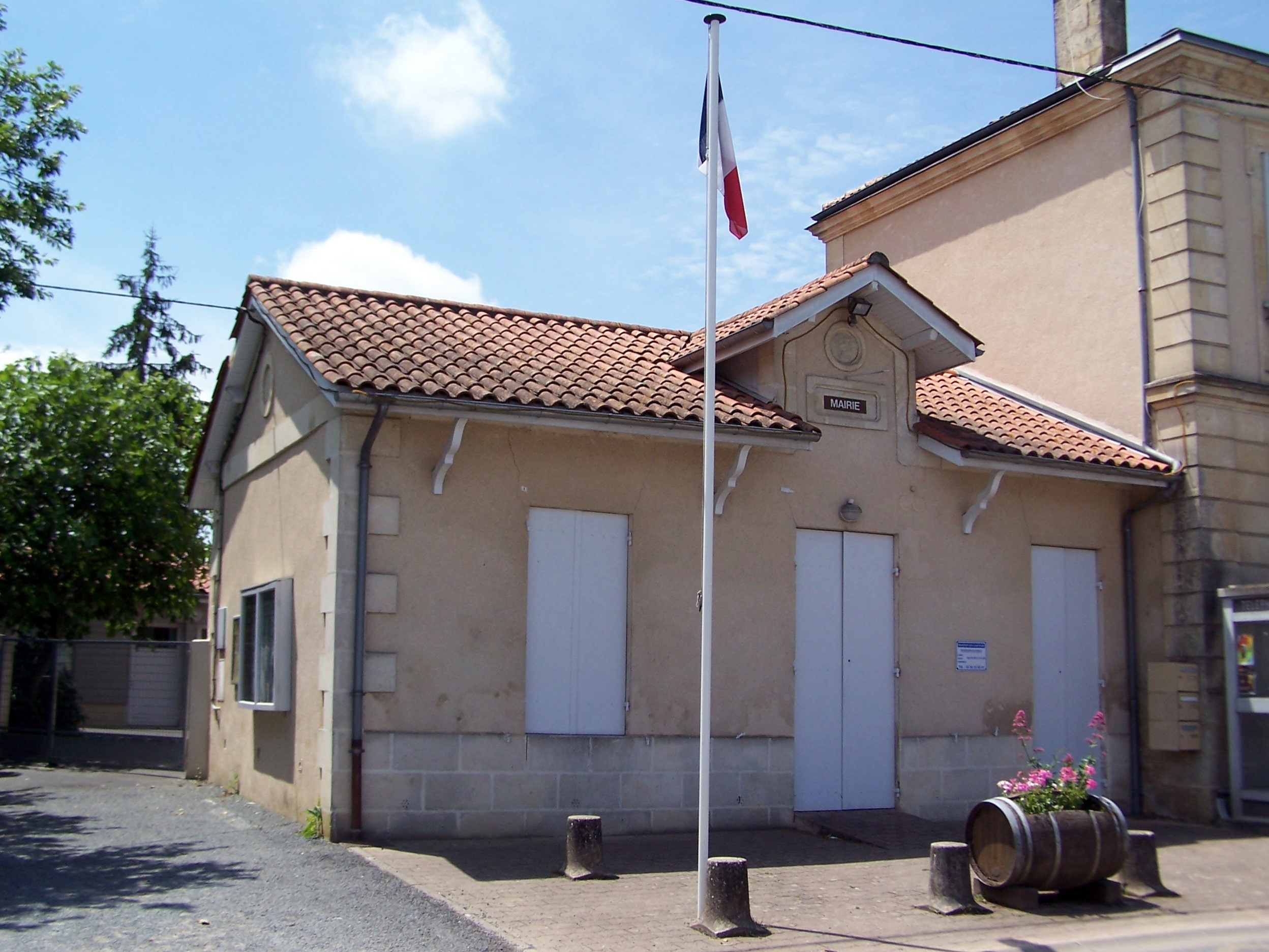
- Town hall
- Location of Cantois
- Location within France Location within Nouvelle-Aquitaine
- Coordinates: 44°41′38″N 0°13′49″W
- Country: France
- Region: Nouvelle-Aquitaine
- Department: Gironde
- Arrondissement: Langon
- Canton: L'Entre-Deux-Mers
- Commune: Porte-de-Benauge
- Area^{1}: 8 km^{2} (3.1 sq mi)
- Elevation: 50 m (160 ft)
- Highest elevation: 106 m (348 ft)
- Lowest elevation: 44 m (144 ft)
- Population (2016): 237
  - Density: 30/km^{2} (77/sq mi)
- Time zone: UTC+01:00 (CET)
  - Summer (DST): UTC+02:00 (CEST)
- Postal code: 33760
- ^{1} French Land Register data, which excludes lakes, ponds, glaciers > 1 km^{2} (0.386 sq mi or 247 acres) and river estuaries.

Cantois (French pronunciation: [kɑ̃twa]; Gascon: Cantòis) is a former commune in the Gironde department in Nouvelle-Aquitaine in southwestern France. On 1 January 2019, it was merged into the new commune Porte-de-Benauge.

== See also ==
- Communes of the Gironde department
