= Blaignan-Prignac =

- Commune
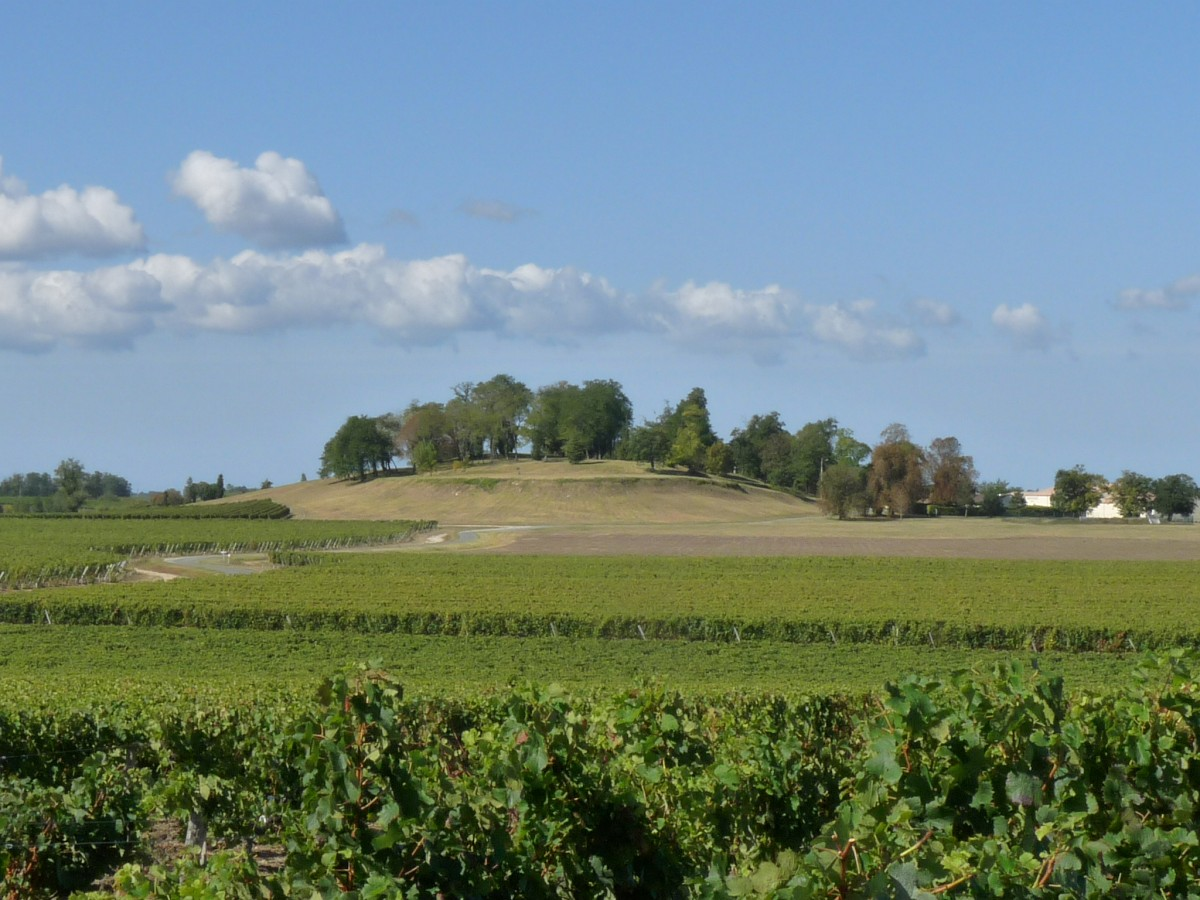
- Site of the former castle
- Location of Blaignan-Prignac
- Location within France Location within Nouvelle-Aquitaine
- Coordinates: 45°19′23″N 0°52′37″W
- Country: France
- Region: Nouvelle-Aquitaine
- Department: Gironde
- Arrondissement: Lesparre-Médoc
- Canton: Le Nord-Médoc
- Intercommunality: Médoc Cœur de Presqu'île

Government
  - Mayor (2020–2026): Alexandre Pierrard
- Area^{1}: 14.18 km^{2} (5.47 sq mi)
- Elevation: 20 m (66 ft)
- Highest elevation: 34 m (112 ft)
- Lowest elevation: 7 m (23 ft)
- Population (2023): 450
  - Density: 32/km^{2} (82/sq mi)
- Time zone: UTC+01:00 (CET)
  - Summer (DST): UTC+02:00 (CEST)
- INSEE/Postal code: 33055 /33340
- ^{1} French Land Register data, which excludes lakes, ponds, glaciers > 1 km^{2} (0.386 sq mi or 247 acres) and river estuaries.

Blaignan-Prignac (French pronunciation: [blɛɲɑ̃ pʁiɲak]; Gascon: Blanhan e Prinhac) is a commune in the Gironde department in Nouvelle-Aquitaine in southwestern France. It was established on 1 January 2019 by merger of the former communes of Blaignan (the seat) and Prignac-en-Médoc.

== See also ==
- Communes of the Gironde department
