= Prignac-en-Médoc =

- Part of Blaignan-Prignac
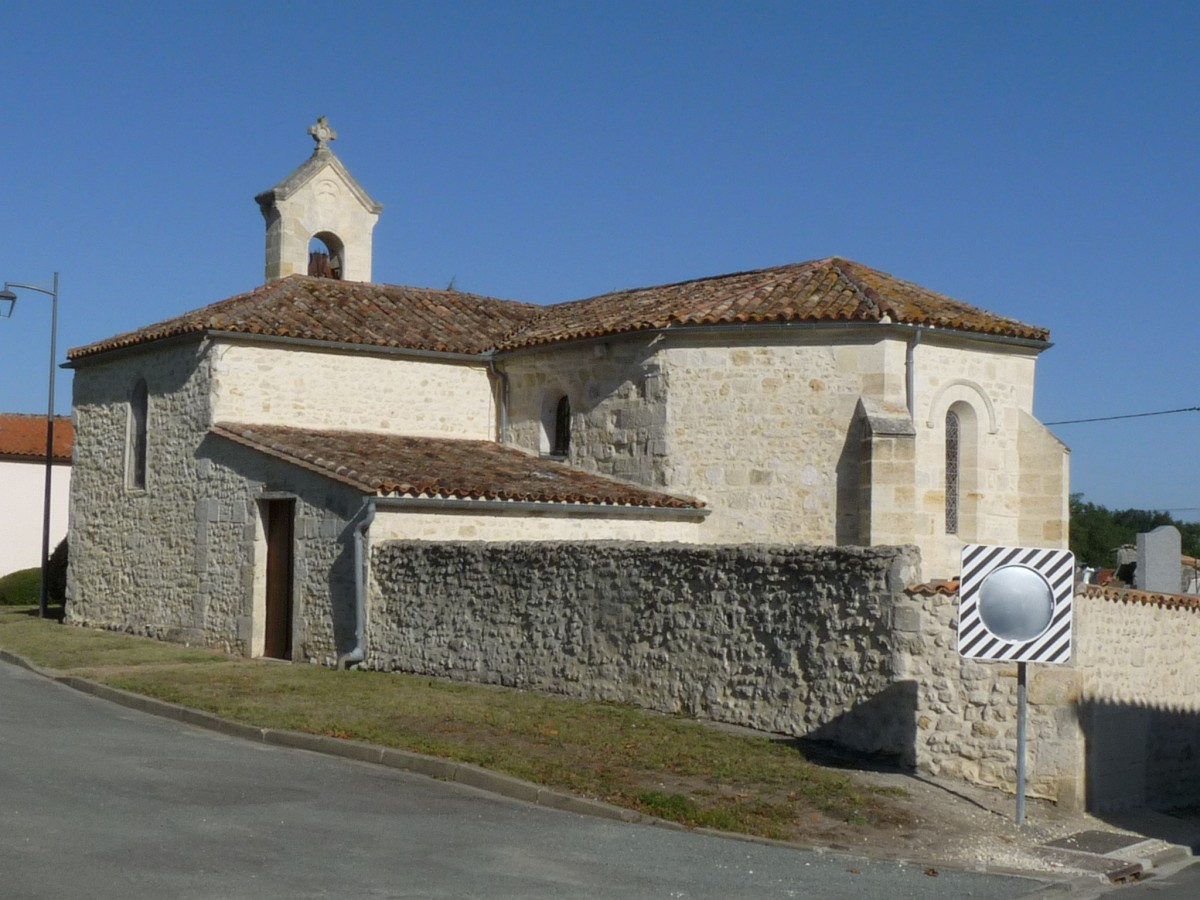
- Location of Prignac-en-Médoc
- Location within France Location within Nouvelle-Aquitaine
- Coordinates: 45°19′37″N 0°54′47″W
- Country: France
- Region: Nouvelle-Aquitaine
- Department: Gironde
- Arrondissement: Lesparre-Médoc
- Canton: Le Nord-Médoc
- Commune: Blaignan-Prignac
- Area^{1}: 7.35 km^{2} (2.84 sq mi)
- Elevation: 13 m (43 ft)
- Population (2016): 206
  - Density: 28.0/km^{2} (72.6/sq mi)
- Time zone: UTC+01:00 (CET)
  - Summer (DST): UTC+02:00 (CEST)
- Postal code: 33340
- ^{1} French Land Register data, which excludes lakes, ponds, glaciers > 1 km^{2} (0.386 sq mi or 247 acres) and river estuaries.

Prignac-en-Médoc (French pronunciation: [pʁiɲak ɑ̃ medɔk], literally Prignac in Médoc; Gascon: Prinhac de Medòc) is a former commune in the Gironde department in Nouvelle-Aquitaine in southwestern France. On 1 January 2019, it was merged into the new commune Blaignan-Prignac.

== See also ==
- Communes of the Gironde department
