= Saint-Genis-du-Bois =

- Part of Porte-de-Benauge
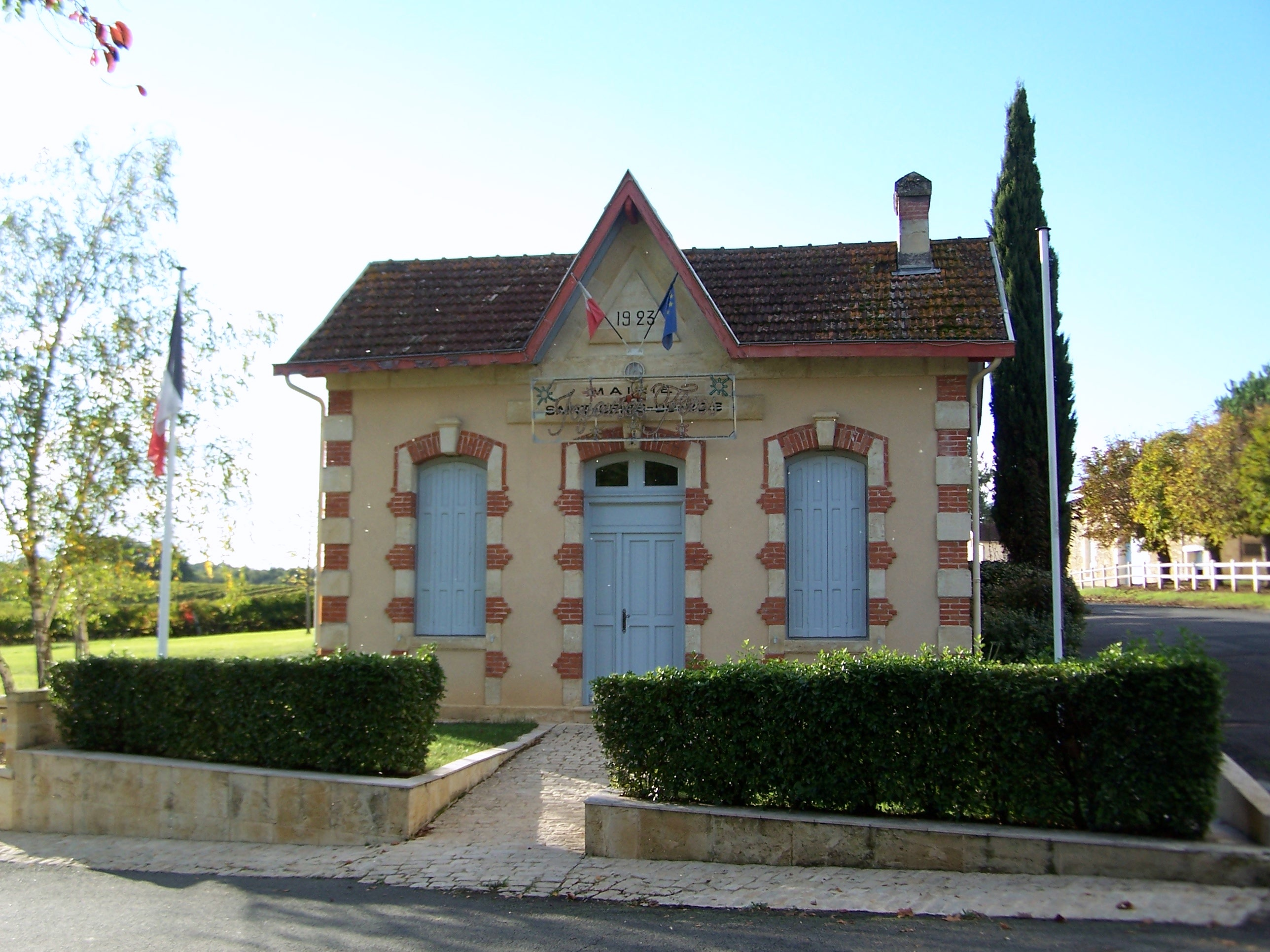
- Town hall
- Location of Saint-Genis-du-Bois
- Location within France Location within Nouvelle-Aquitaine
- Coordinates: 44°42′10″N 0°10′26″W
- Country: France
- Region: Nouvelle-Aquitaine
- Department: Gironde
- Arrondissement: Langon
- Canton: L'Entre-Deux-Mers
- Commune: Porte-de-Benauge
- Area^{1}: 2.34 km^{2} (0.90 sq mi)
- Elevation: 50 m (160 ft)
- Highest elevation: 85 m (279 ft)
- Lowest elevation: 42 m (138 ft)
- Population (2023): 90
  - Density: 38/km^{2} (100/sq mi)
- Time zone: UTC+01:00 (CET)
  - Summer (DST): UTC+02:00 (CEST)
- Postal code: 33760
- ^{1} French Land Register data, which excludes lakes, ponds, glaciers > 1 km^{2} (0.386 sq mi or 247 acres) and river estuaries.

Saint-Genis-du-Bois (Gascon: Sent Genís deu Bòsc or Sent Genís dau Bòsc) is a former commune in the Gironde department in Nouvelle-Aquitaine in southwestern France. On 1 January 2025, it was merged into the commune of Porte-de-Benauge.

== See also ==
- Communes of the Gironde department
