= Christelle Dubos =

French politician

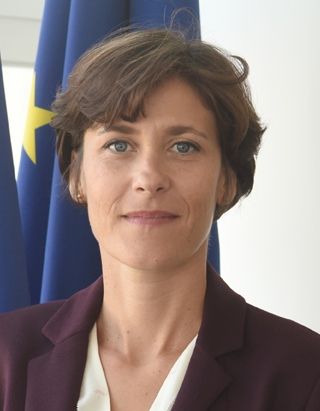

Member of the National Assembly for Gironde's 12th constituency
- In office 4 August 2020 – 21 June 2022
- Preceded by: Pascal Lavergne
- Succeeded by: Pascal Lavergne
- In office 21 June 2017 – 16 November 2018
- Preceded by: Martine Faure
- Succeeded by: Pascal Lavergne

Secretary of State to the Minister of Solidarities and Health
- In office 16 October 2018 – 6 July 2020
- President: Emmanuel Macron
- Prime Minister: Édouard Philippe

Member of the Municipal council of Sadirac
- In office 2014–2020

Personal details
- Born: 26 March 1976 (age 50) Le Coteau, France
- Party: La République En Marche!
- Profession: Social worker

Christelle Dubos (born 26 March 1976) is a French politician of La République En Marche! (LREM) who was elected to the French National Assembly from 2017 to 2022, representing the department of Gironde.

== Early life and education ==
Dubos is the daughter of an engineer and a seamstress. She is the mother of two children.

== Professional career ==
Holder of a diploma of social worker, Dubos practiced between 1998 and 2007, before participating in the setting up of the Intercommunal Center of Social Action in the community of communes of Créonnais. Until her election in June 2017, she was Director of Solidarity and Employment at the community of Montesquieu.

== Political career ==
Dubos began her political career a councillor of Sadirac, responsible for social affairs, housing and solidarity in April 2014.

Not affiliated with a political party until then, Dubos joined the movement En Marche, which she believes "share the values" in December 2016.

=== Member of the National Assembly ===
On 11 May 2017 Dubos was chosen by La République En Marche! to be the party's candidate in the 12th constituency of the Gironde. She won on 18 June 2017 with 56.71% of the vote ahead of Christophe Miqueu, candidate of La France Insoumise. She succeeded Martine Faure, who decided not to run again.

In parliament, Dubos served on the Committee on Economic Affairs. In this capacity, she was particularly committed to territorial cohesion, housing and professional integration. She was also a co-rapporteur on the evolution of housing, planning and digital technology (ELAN Law), particularly on the aspects related to housing and social mix

=== Member of the Government ===
From 2018 until 2020, Dubos served as Secretary of State to the Minister of Solidarities and Health in the government of Prime Minister Édouard Philippe, serving under the leadership of the successive Ministers of Solidarities and Health Agnès Buzyn and Olivier Véran. In that capacity, she oversaw the ministry’s activities on the fight against poverty, family policies and access to care for the poor.
