= Pascal Lavergne =

French politician

Member of the National Assembly for Gironde's 12th constituency
- In office 17 November 2018 – 3 August 2020
- Preceded by: Christelle Dubos
- Succeeded by: Christelle Dubos
- In office 21 June 2022 – 21 June 2024
- Succeeded by: Mathilde Feld

Personal details
- Born: 28 August 1967 (age 58) Limoges, Haute-Vienne, France
- Party: Renaissance (from 2017)
- Other political affiliations: Socialist Party

Pascal Lavergne (born 28 August 1967) is a French politician from En Marche. He was Member of Parliament for Gironde's 12th constituency from 2018 to 2020. He was elected to a full term in the 2022 French legislative election but was unseated at the 2024 French legislative election.

== See also ==
- List of deputies of the 15th National Assembly of France
- List of deputies of the 16th National Assembly of France
