= Saint-Félix-de-Foncaude =

- Commune
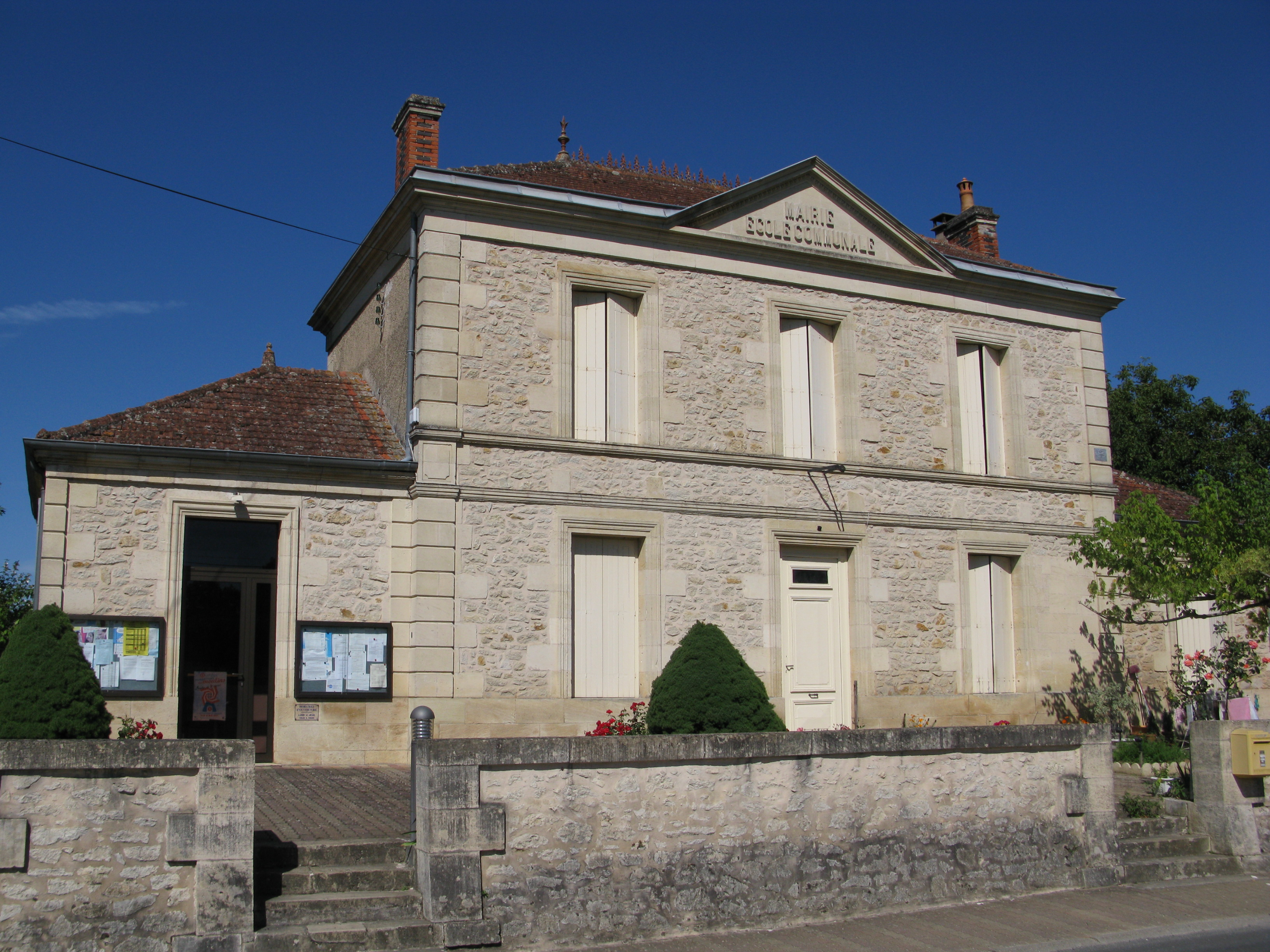
- Town hall
- Location of Saint-Félix-de-Foncaude
- Location within France Location within Nouvelle-Aquitaine
- Coordinates: 44°38′57″N 0°05′39″W
- Country: France
- Region: Nouvelle-Aquitaine
- Department: Gironde
- Arrondissement: Langon
- Canton: Le Réolais et Les Bastides

Government
  - Mayor (2020–2026): Bernard Rebillou
- Area^{1}: 10.33 km^{2} (3.99 sq mi)
- Elevation: 80 m (260 ft)
- Highest elevation: 86 m (282 ft)
- Lowest elevation: 25 m (82 ft)
- Population (2023): 293
  - Density: 28.4/km^{2} (73.5/sq mi)
- Time zone: UTC+01:00 (CET)
  - Summer (DST): UTC+02:00 (CEST)
- INSEE/Postal code: 33399 /33540
- ^{1} French Land Register data, which excludes lakes, ponds, glaciers > 1 km^{2} (0.386 sq mi or 247 acres) and river estuaries.

Saint-Félix-de-Foncaude (French pronunciation: [sɛ̃ feliks də fɔ̃kod]; Occitan: Sent Feliç de Fontcauda) is a commune in the Gironde department in Nouvelle-Aquitaine in southwestern France.

== Population ==
Historical population
Year	Pop.	±% p.a.
1968	258	—
1975	221	−2.19%
1982	206	−1.00%
1990	244	+2.14%
1999	256	+0.53%
2007	285	+1.35%
2012	298	+0.90%
2017	288	−0.68%
2023	293	+0.29%
Source: INSEE

== See also ==
- Communes of the Gironde department
