= Blaignan =

Commune in Gironde, France

- Part of Blaignan-Prignac
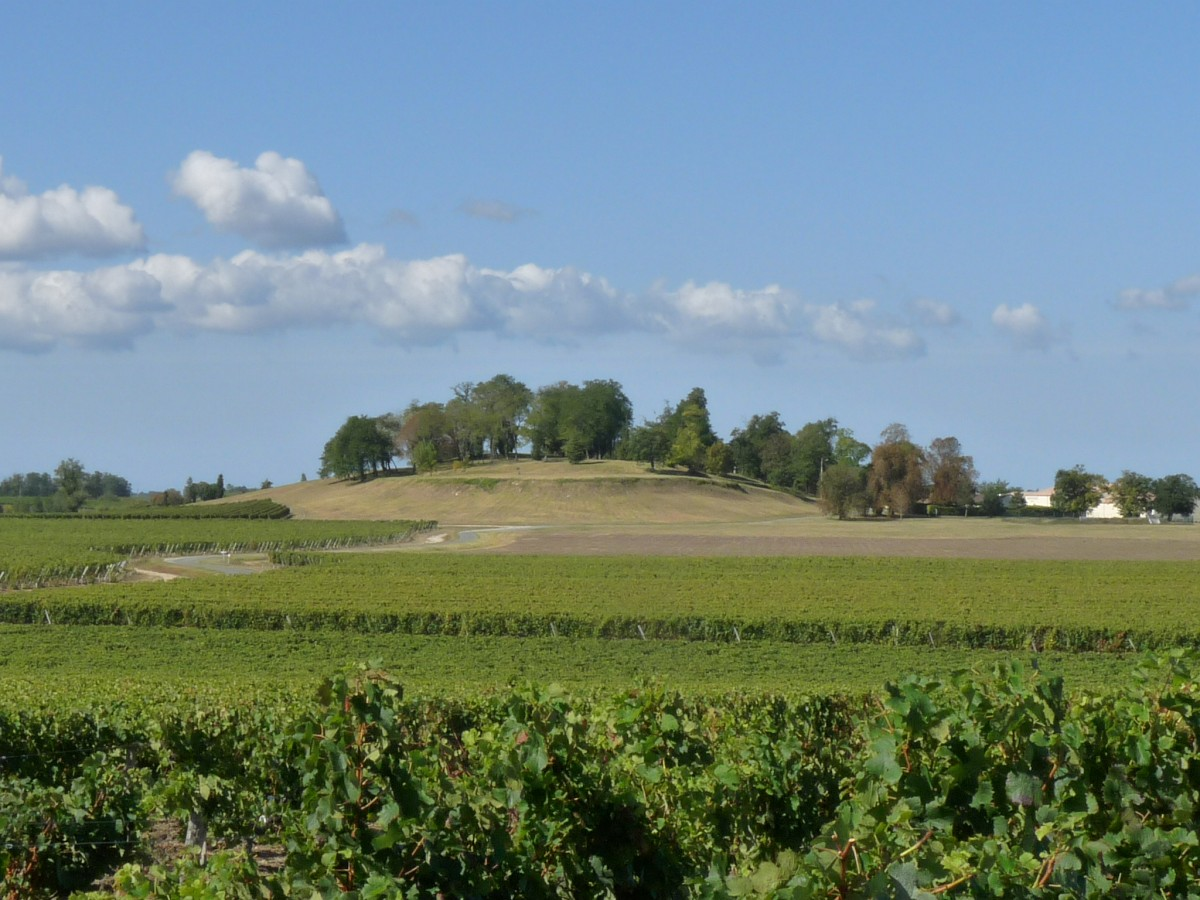
- Site of the former castle
- Location of Blaignan
- Location within France Location within Nouvelle-Aquitaine
- Coordinates: 45°19′23″N 0°52′37″W
- Country: France
- Region: Nouvelle-Aquitaine
- Department: Gironde
- Arrondissement: Lesparre-Médoc
- Canton: Le Nord-Médoc
- Commune: Blaignan-Prignac
- Area^{1}: 6.83 km^{2} (2.64 sq mi)
- Elevation: 20 m (66 ft)
- Highest elevation: 34 m (112 ft)
- Lowest elevation: 7 m (23 ft)
- Population (2019): 260
  - Density: 38/km^{2} (99/sq mi)
- Time zone: UTC+01:00 (CET)
  - Summer (DST): UTC+02:00 (CEST)
- Postal code: 33340
- ^{1} French Land Register data, which excludes lakes, ponds, glaciers > 1 km^{2} (0.386 sq mi or 247 acres) and river estuaries.

Blaignan (French pronunciation: [blɛɲɑ̃]; Gascon: Blanhan) is a former commune in the Gironde department in Nouvelle-Aquitaine in southwestern France. On 1 January 2019, it was merged into the new commune Blaignan-Prignac.

== See also ==
- Communes of the Gironde department
