= Saint-André-et-Appelles =

- Commune
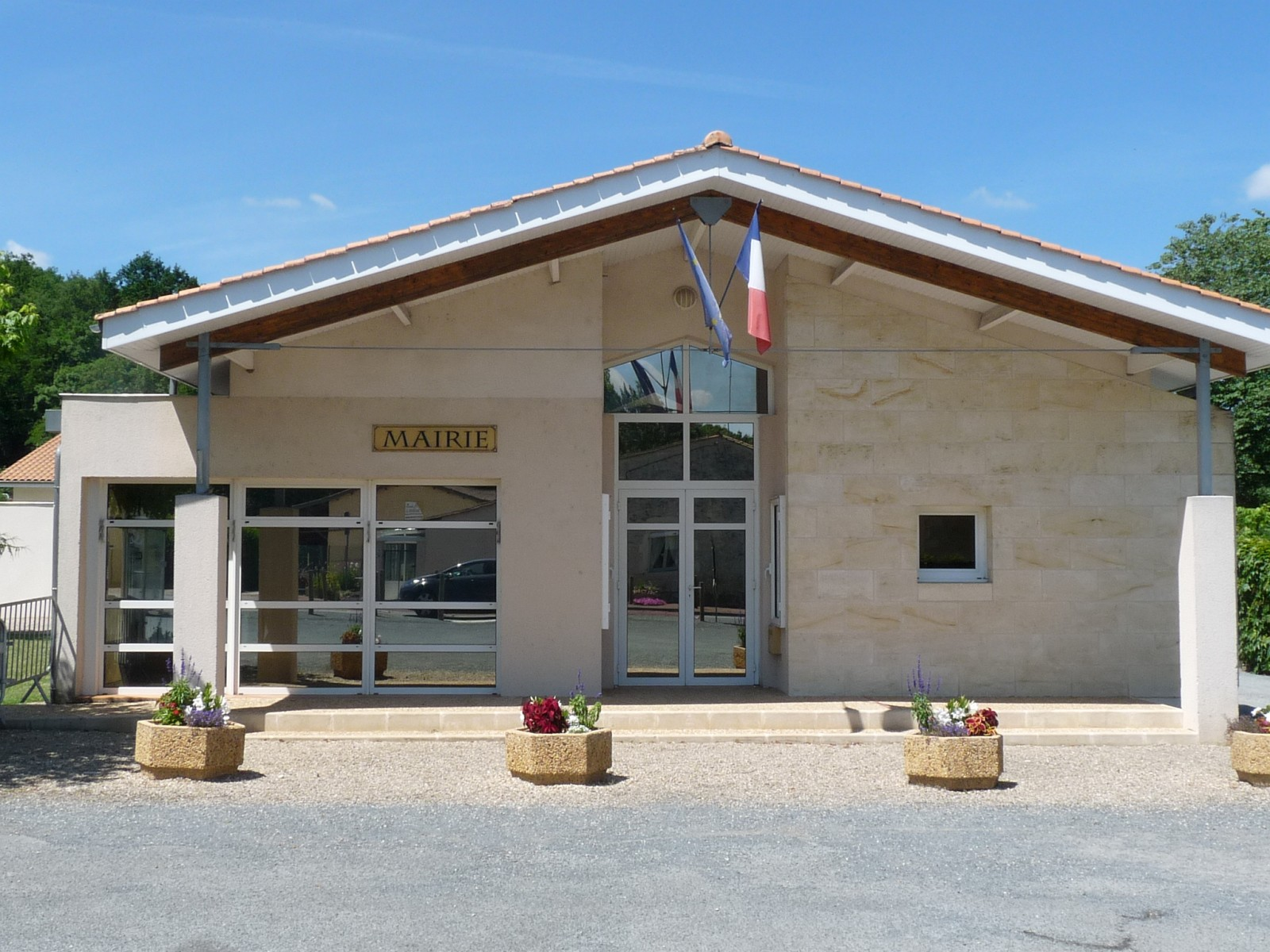
- The town hall in Saint-André-et-Appelles

- Coat of arms
- Location of Saint-André-et-Appelles
- Location within France Location within Nouvelle-Aquitaine
- Coordinates: 44°49′12″N 0°11′42″E
- Country: France
- Region: Nouvelle-Aquitaine
- Department: Gironde
- Arrondissement: Libourne
- Canton: Le Réolais et Les Bastides
- Intercommunality: Pays Foyen

Government
  - Mayor (2020–2026): Éric Fréchou
- Area^{1}: 10.25 km^{2} (3.96 sq mi)
- Elevation: 100 m (330 ft)
- Highest elevation: 114 m (374 ft)
- Lowest elevation: 7 m (23 ft)
- Population (2023): 671
  - Density: 65.5/km^{2} (170/sq mi)
- Time zone: UTC+01:00 (CET)
  - Summer (DST): UTC+02:00 (CEST)
- INSEE/Postal code: 33369 /33220
- ^{1} French Land Register data, which excludes lakes, ponds, glaciers > 1 km^{2} (0.386 sq mi or 247 acres) and river estuaries.

Saint-André-et-Appelles (French pronunciation: [sɛ̃.t‿ɑ̃dʁe e apɛl]; Occitan: Sant Andrieu e Apèla) is a commune in the Gironde department in Nouvelle-Aquitaine in southwestern France.

== Population ==
Historical population
Year	Pop.	±% p.a.
1968	532	—
1975	583	+1.32%
1982	607	+0.58%
1990	667	+1.19%
1999	686	+0.31%
2007	675	−0.20%
2012	715	+1.16%
2017	686	−0.82%
2023	671	−0.37%
Source: INSEE

== See also ==
- Communes of the Gironde department
