= Targon =

- Commune
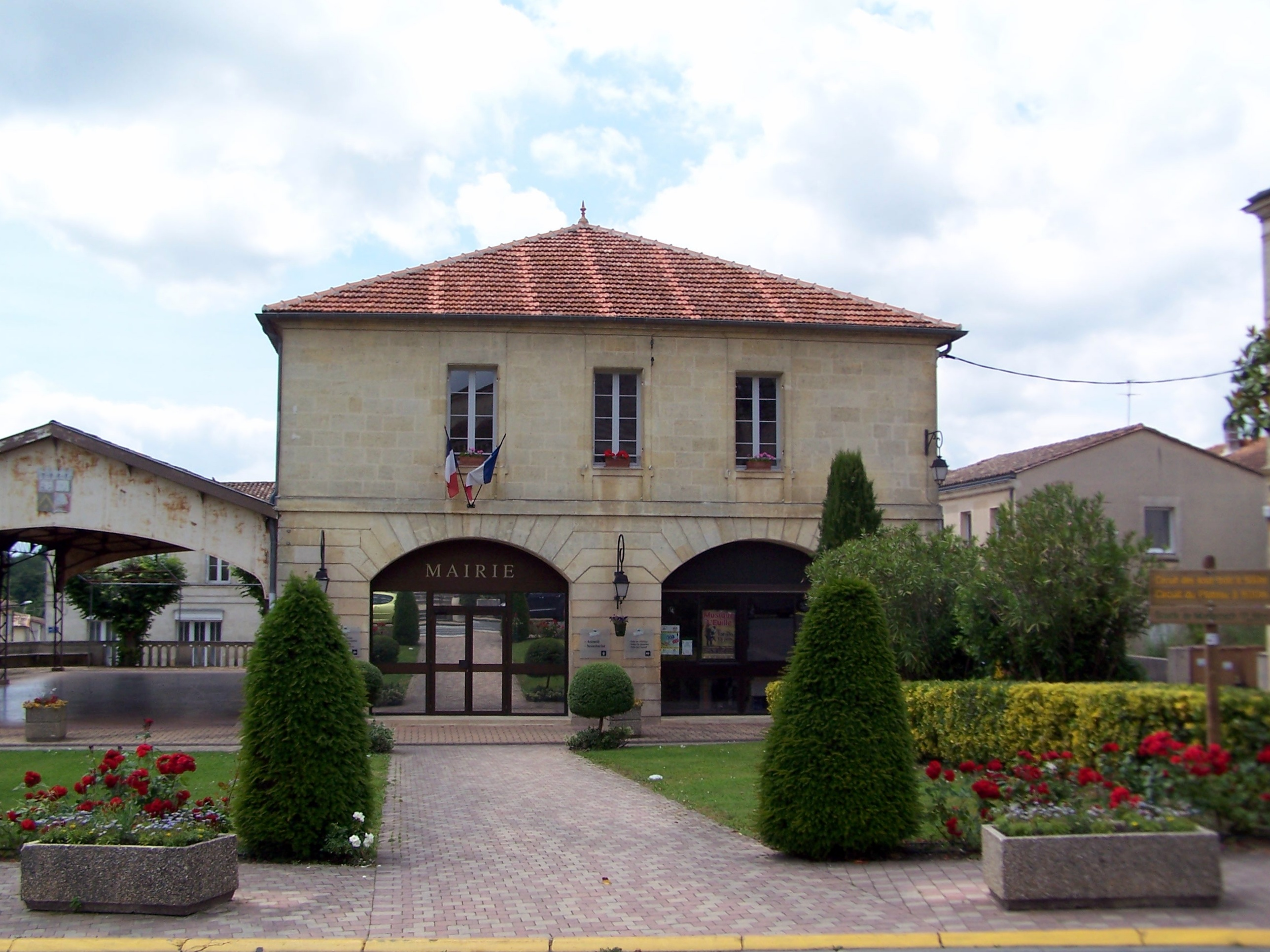
- The town hall in Targon

- Coat of arms
- Location of Targon
- Location within France Location within Nouvelle-Aquitaine
- Coordinates: 44°44′08″N 0°15′45″W
- Country: France
- Region: Nouvelle-Aquitaine
- Department: Gironde
- Arrondissement: Langon
- Canton: L'Entre-Deux-Mers
- Intercommunality: CC rurales de l'Entre-Deux-Mers

Government
  - Mayor (2020–2026): Frédéric Maulun
- Area^{1}: 25.88 km^{2} (9.99 sq mi)
- Elevation: 57 m (187 ft)
- Highest elevation: 118 m (387 ft)
- Lowest elevation: 37 m (121 ft)
- Population (2023): 2,079
  - Density: 80.33/km^{2} (208.1/sq mi)
- Time zone: UTC+01:00 (CET)
  - Summer (DST): UTC+02:00 (CEST)
- INSEE/Postal code: 33523 /33760
- ^{1} French Land Register data, which excludes lakes, ponds, glaciers > 1 km^{2} (0.386 sq mi or 247 acres) and river estuaries.

Targon (French pronunciation: [taʁɡɔ̃]) is a commune in the Gironde department in Nouvelle-Aquitaine in southwestern France.

== Population ==
Historical population
Year	Pop.	±% p.a.
1968	1,132	—
1975	1,195	+0.78%
1982	1,435	+2.65%
1990	1,609	+1.44%
1999	1,685	+0.51%
2007	1,888	+1.43%
2012	1,885	−0.03%
2017	2,077	+1.96%
2023	2,079	+0.02%
Source: INSEE

== Sights and monuments ==
- Église Saint-Romain de Targon, 12th century Romanesque church, listed as a monument historique since 1925.
- Église de Montarouch, 13th century Romanesque church, once the property of the Knights Hospitaller, now in ruins, listed as a monument historique since 1925.
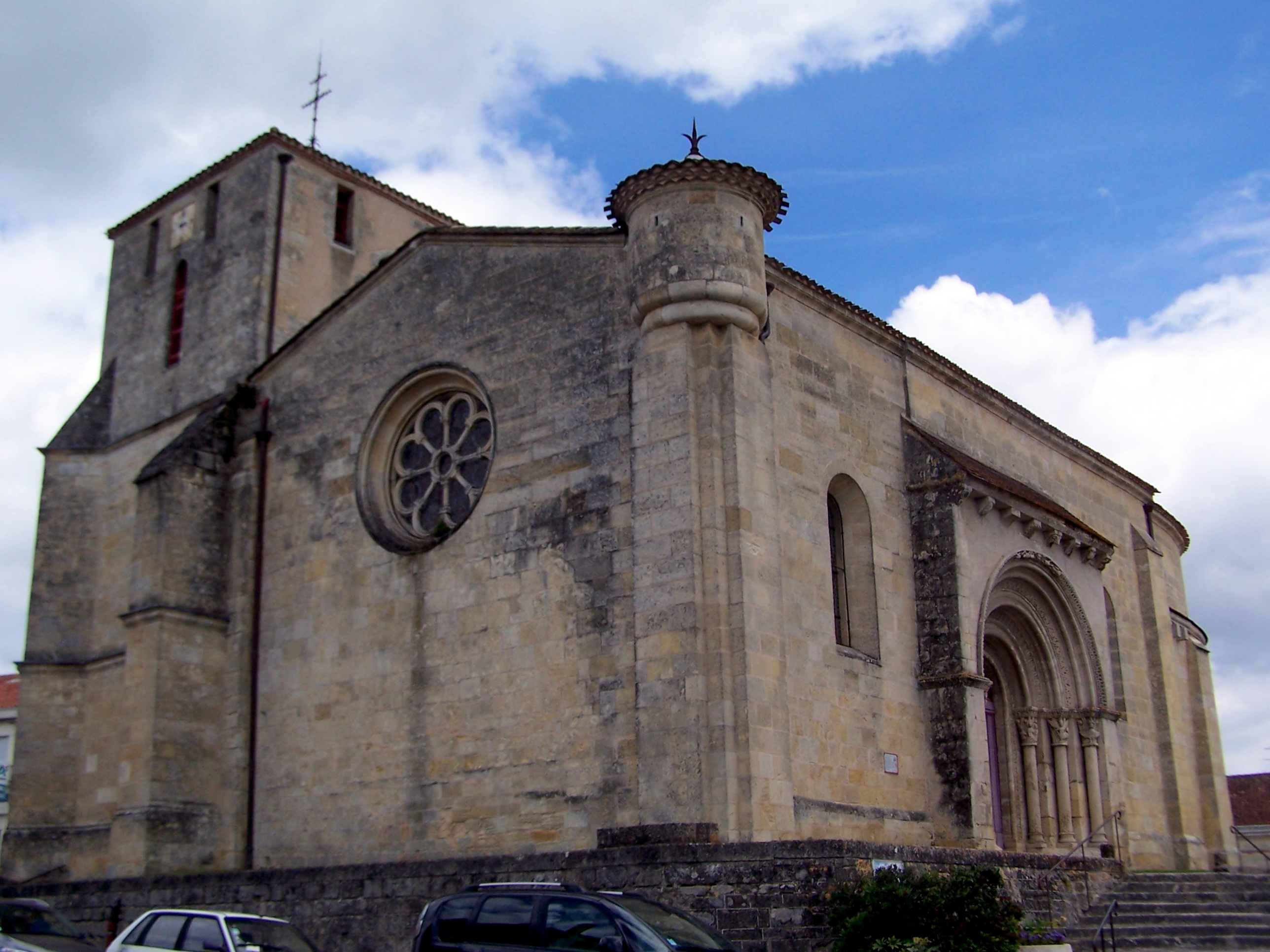
Saint-Romain church, south west view (June 2013)

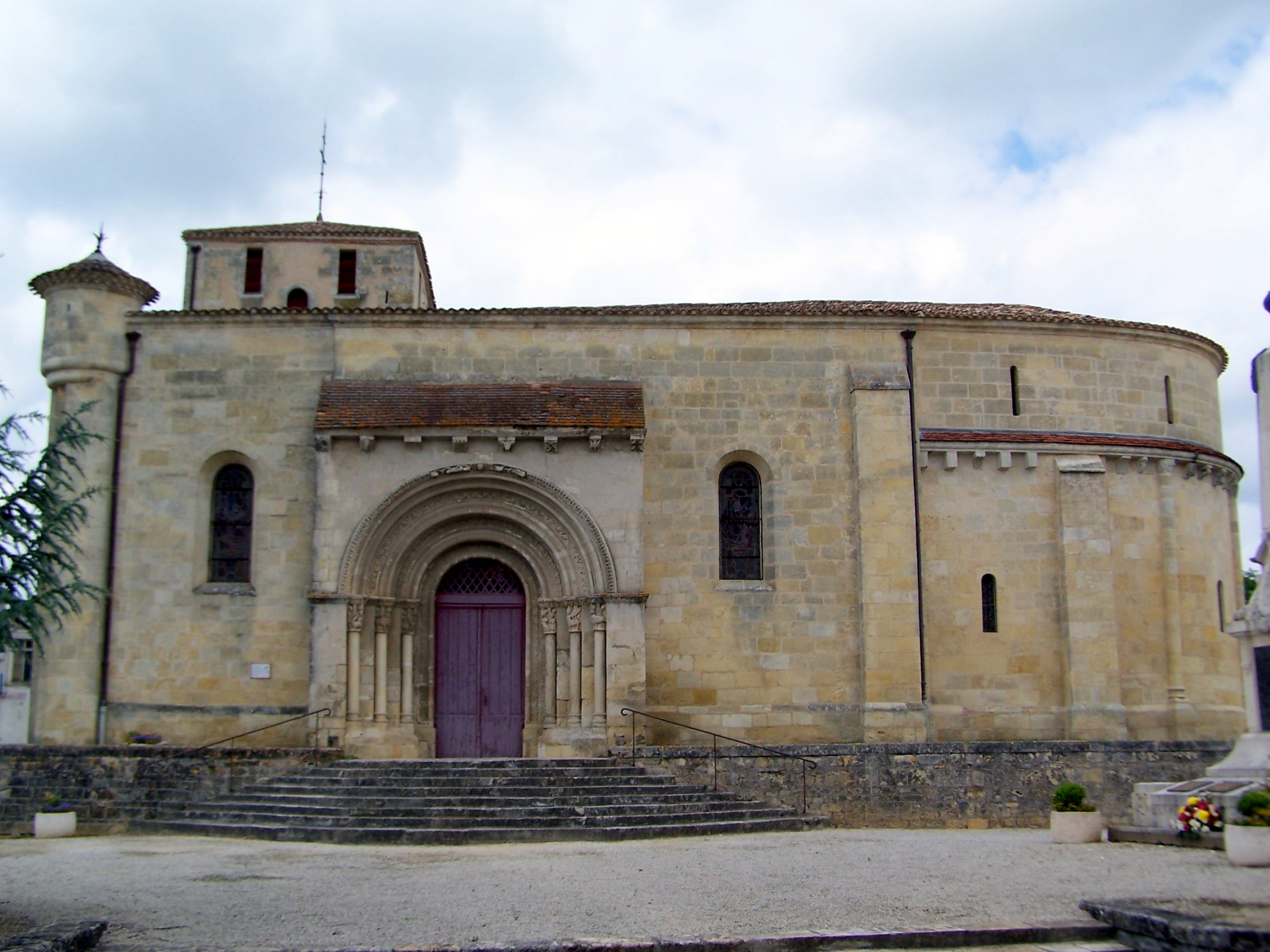
South façade and doorway to the church (June 2013)

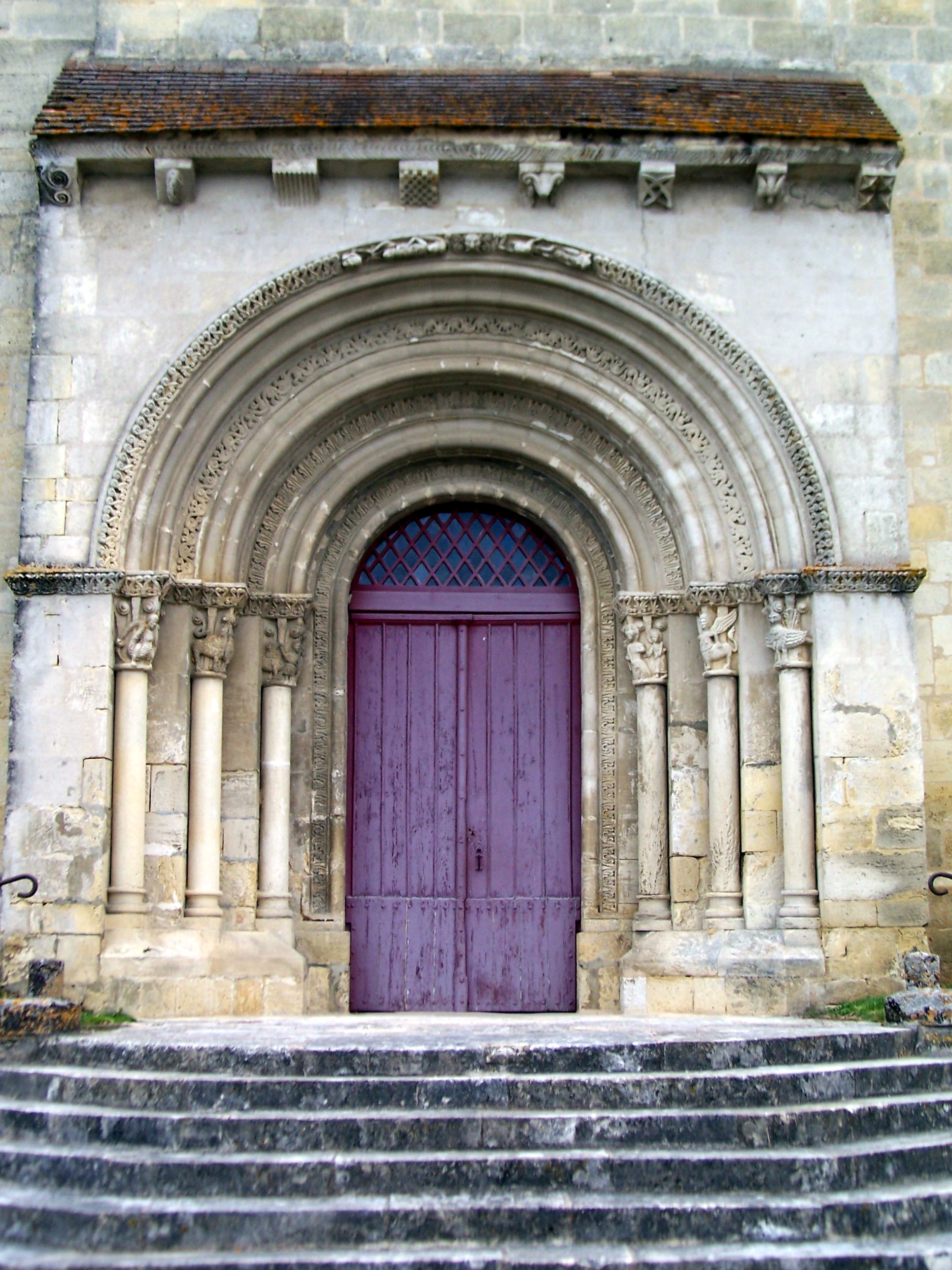
Doorway (June 2013)

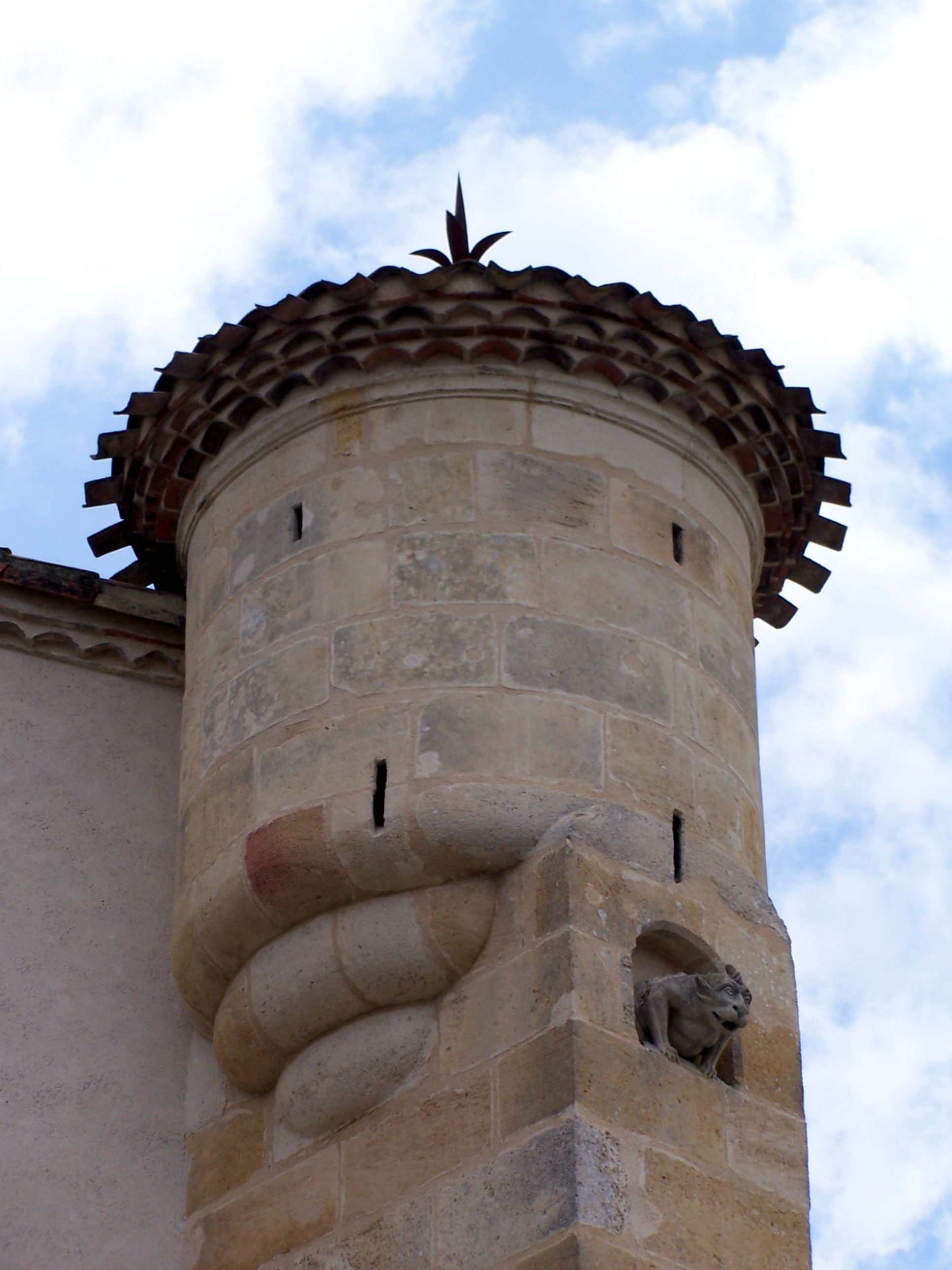
Turret and gargoyle in north east (June 2013)

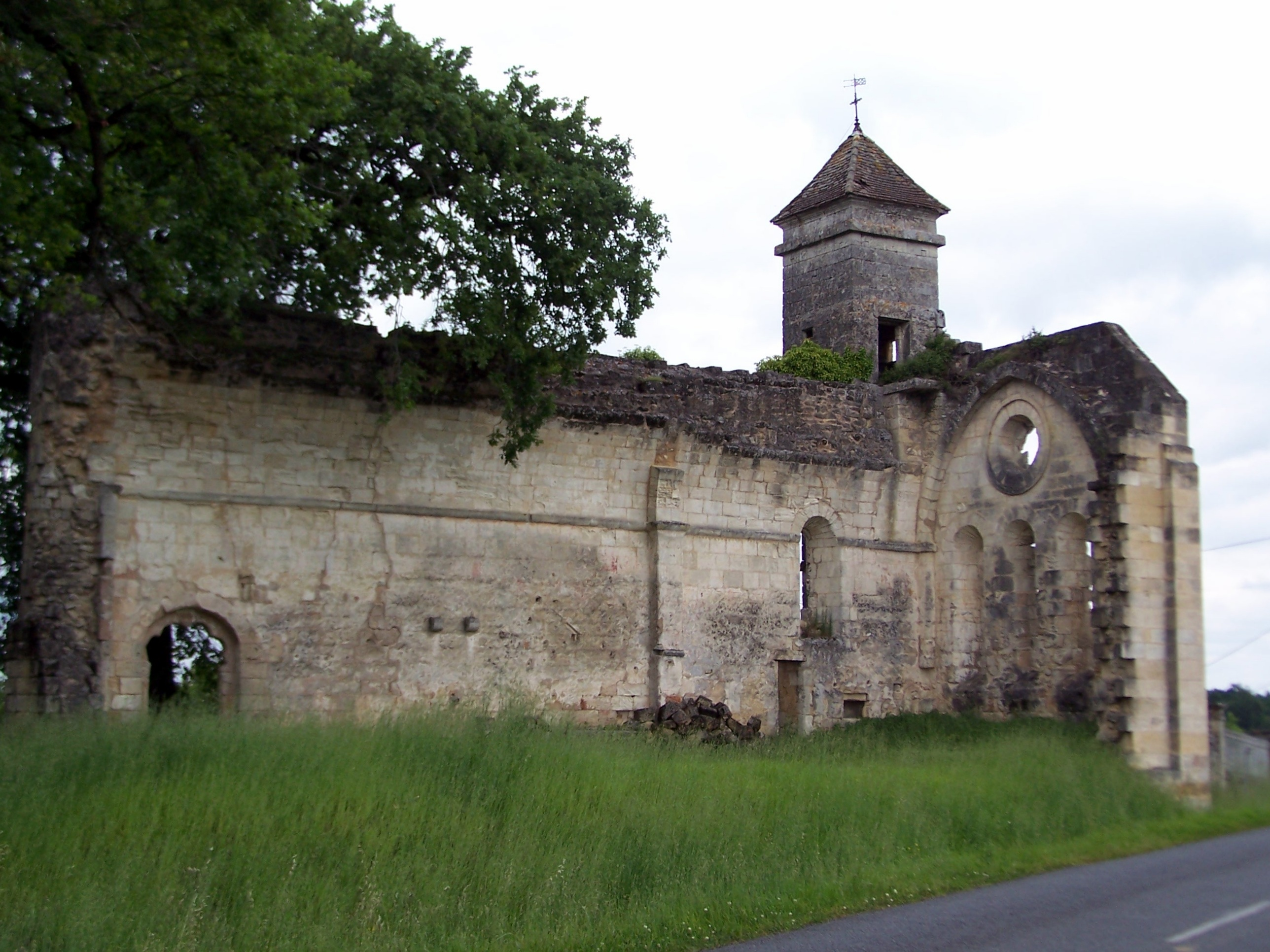
Ruins of Montarouch church, south view (June 2013)

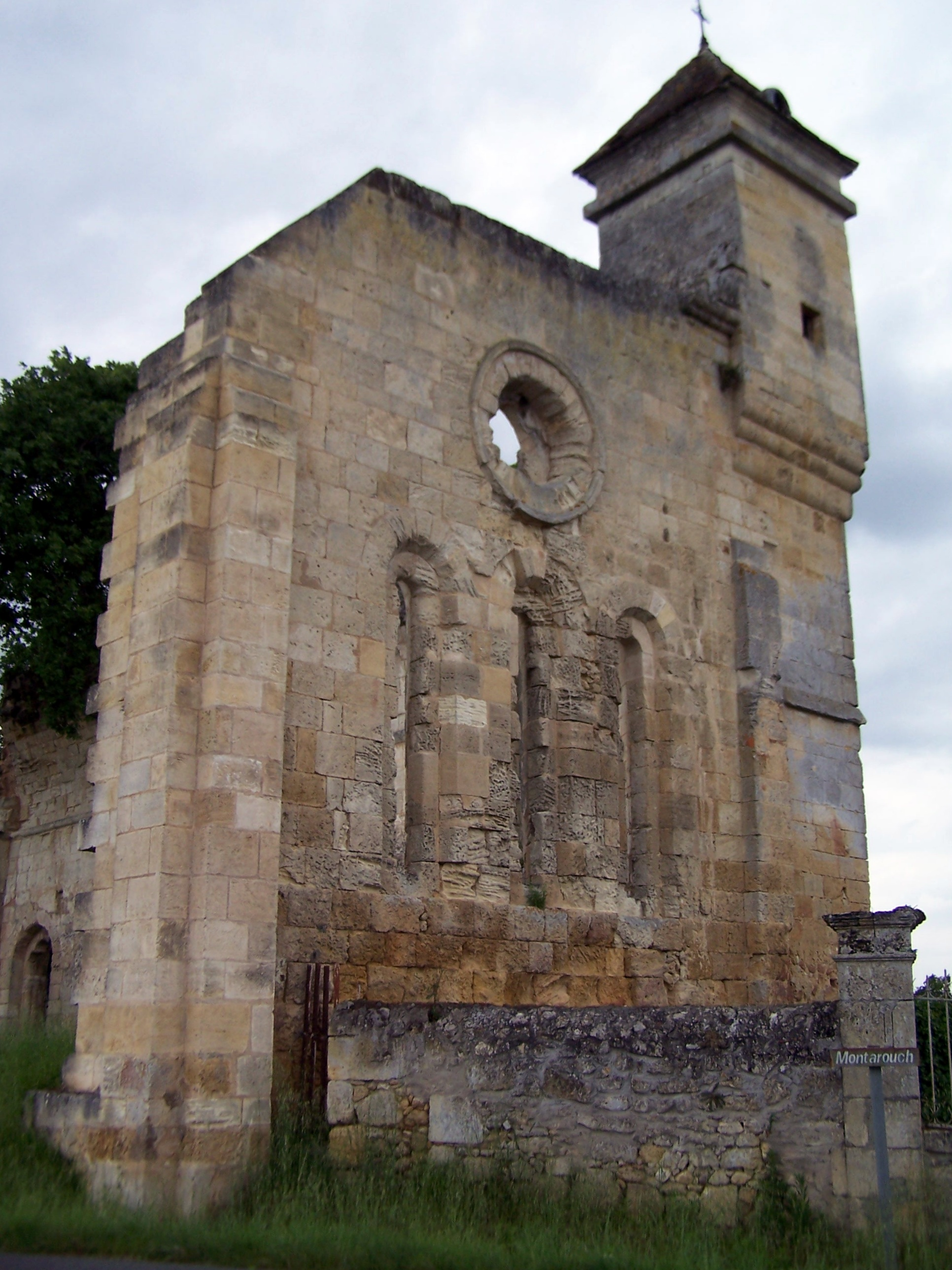
Montarouch church, east view (June 2013)

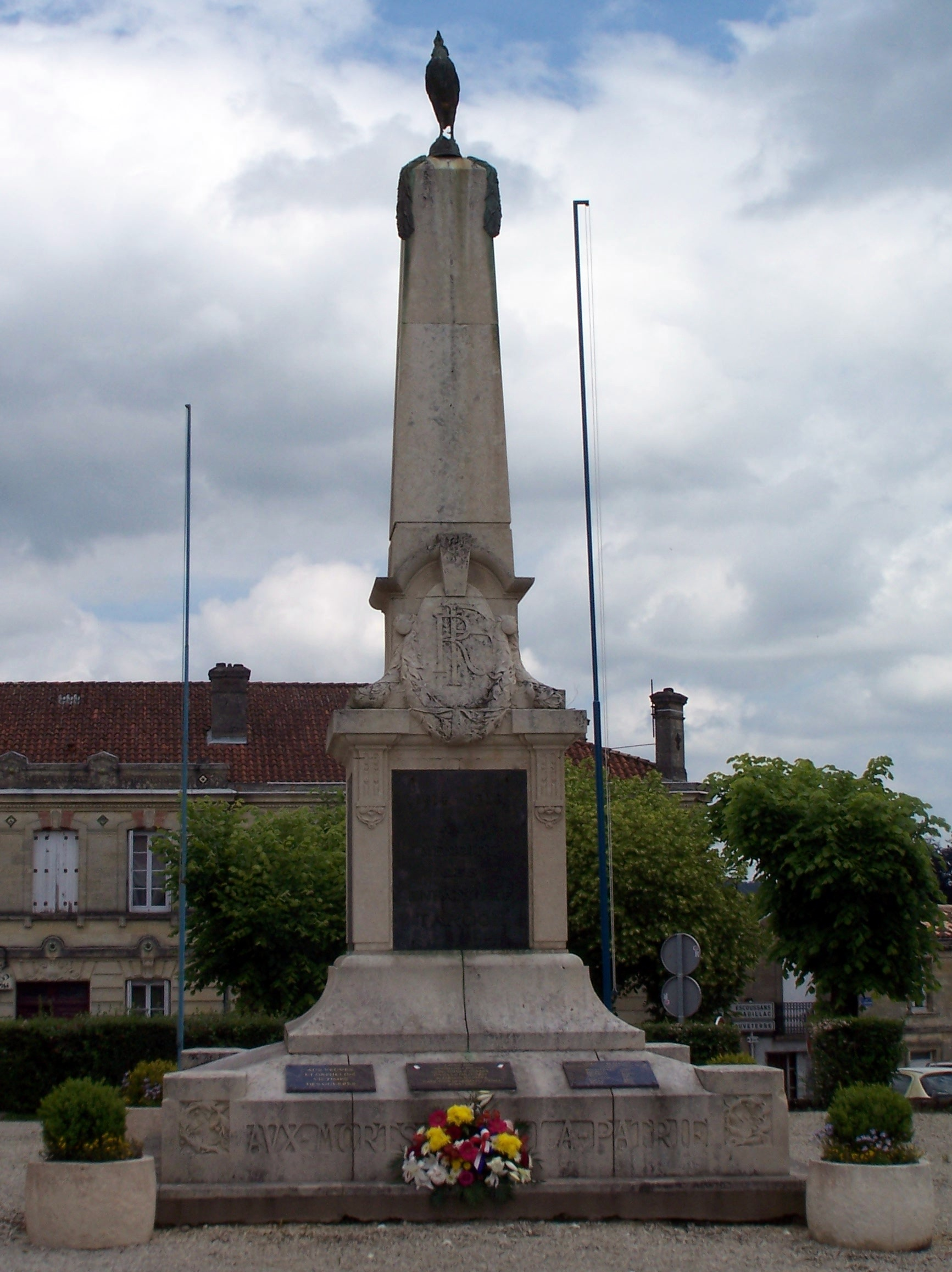
Monument to the dead in front of Saint-Romain church (June 2013)

== See also ==
- Communes of the Gironde department
