= Arbis =

- Part of Porte-de-Benauge
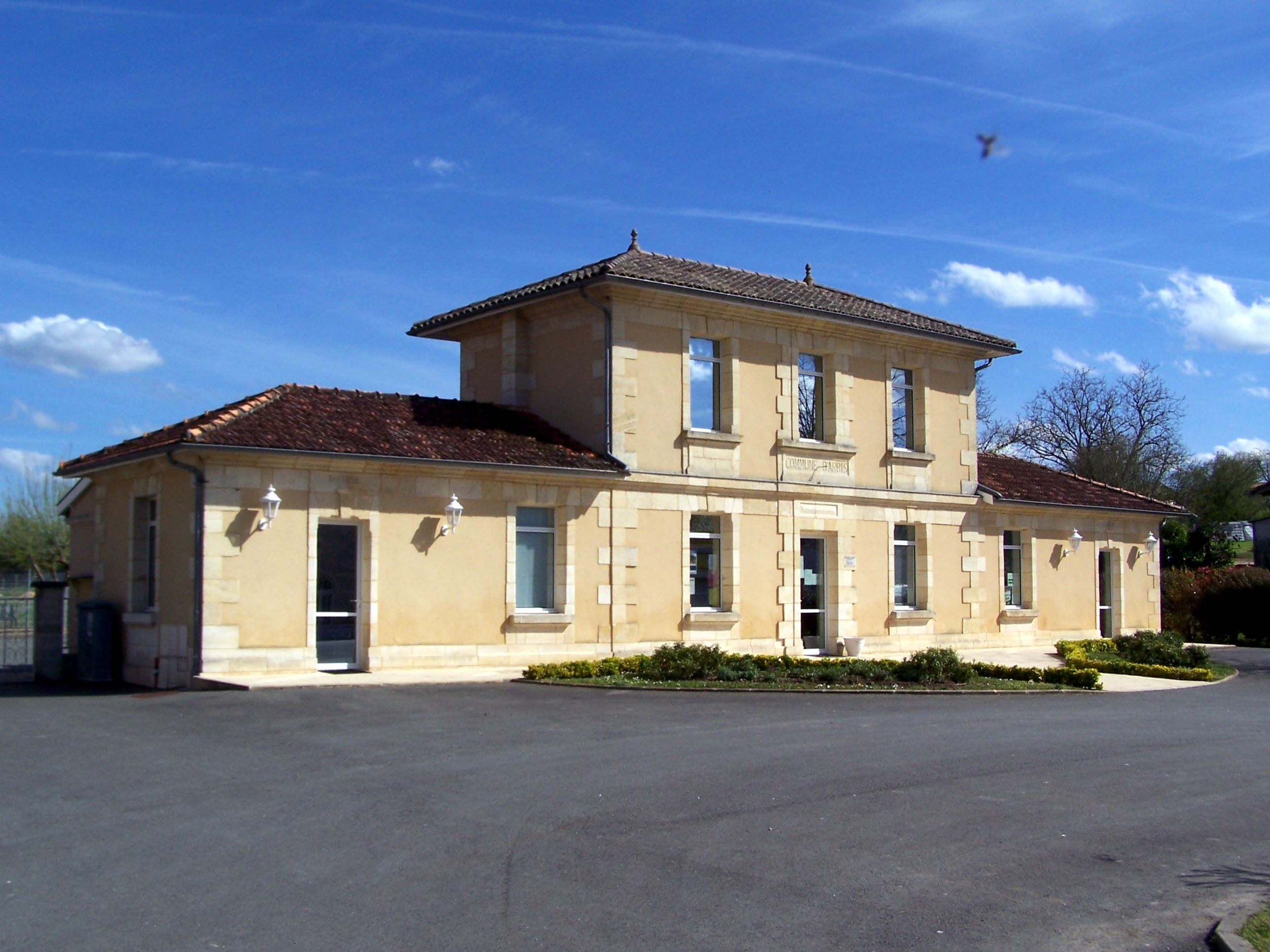
- The town hall in Arbis
- Location of Arbis
- Location within France Location within Nouvelle-Aquitaine
- Coordinates: 44°40′46″N 0°14′41″W
- Country: France
- Region: Nouvelle-Aquitaine
- Department: Gironde
- Arrondissement: Langon
- Canton: L'Entre-Deux-Mers
- Commune: Porte-de-Benauge
- Area^{1}: 8.74 km^{2} (3.37 sq mi)
- Elevation: 41 m (135 ft)
- Highest elevation: 107 m (351 ft)
- Lowest elevation: 23 m (75 ft)
- Population (2016): 276
  - Density: 31.6/km^{2} (81.8/sq mi)
- Time zone: UTC+01:00 (CET)
  - Summer (DST): UTC+02:00 (CEST)
- Postal code: 33760
- ^{1} French Land Register data, which excludes lakes, ponds, glaciers > 1 km^{2} (0.386 sq mi or 247 acres) and river estuaries.

Arbis (Gascon: Arbís) is a former commune in the Gironde department in southwestern France. On 1 January 2019, it was merged into the new commune Porte-de-Benauge.

== See also ==
- Communes of the Gironde department
