= Illats =

- Commune
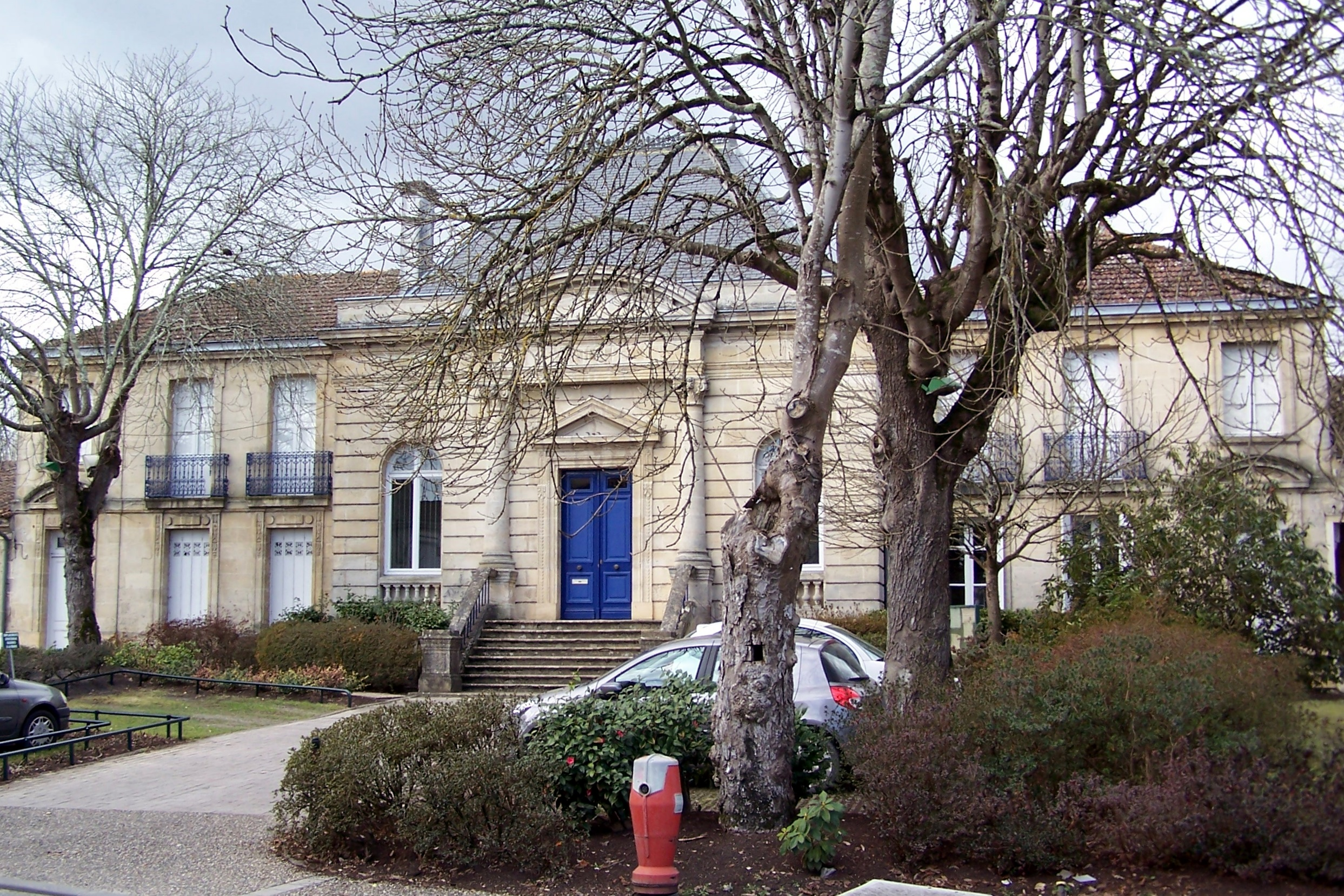
- Town hall

- Coat of arms
- Location of Illats
- Location within France Location within Nouvelle-Aquitaine
- Coordinates: 44°35′54″N 0°22′18″W
- Country: France
- Region: Nouvelle-Aquitaine
- Department: Gironde
- Arrondissement: Langon
- Canton: Les Landes des Graves
- Intercommunality: Convergence Garonne

Government
  - Mayor (2021–2026): Patricia Peigney
- Area^{1}: 29.24 km^{2} (11.29 sq mi)
- Highest elevation: 61 m (200 ft)
- Lowest elevation: 3 m (9.8 ft)
- Population (2023): 1,413
  - Density: 48.32/km^{2} (125.2/sq mi)
- Time zone: UTC+01:00 (CET)
  - Summer (DST): UTC+02:00 (CEST)
- INSEE/Postal code: 33205 /33720
- ^{1} French Land Register data, which excludes lakes, ponds, glaciers > 1 km^{2} (0.386 sq mi or 247 acres) and river estuaries.

Illats (French pronunciation: [ilas]; Gascon: Ilats) is a commune in the Gironde department in Nouvelle-Aquitaine in southwestern France.

It was founded in the eleventh century.

Illats is part of the Graves wine-growing region. The Chateau Hillot winery is located here.

== Population ==
Historical population
Year	Pop.	±% p.a.
1968	1,025	—
1975	1,000	−0.35%
1982	1,076	+1.05%
1990	1,158	+0.92%
1999	1,158	+0.00%
2007	1,242	+0.88%
2012	1,321	+1.24%
2017	1,407	+1.27%
2023	1,413	+0.07%
Source: INSEE

== See also ==
- Communes of the Gironde department
