= Gensac, Gironde =

Gensac
- Commune
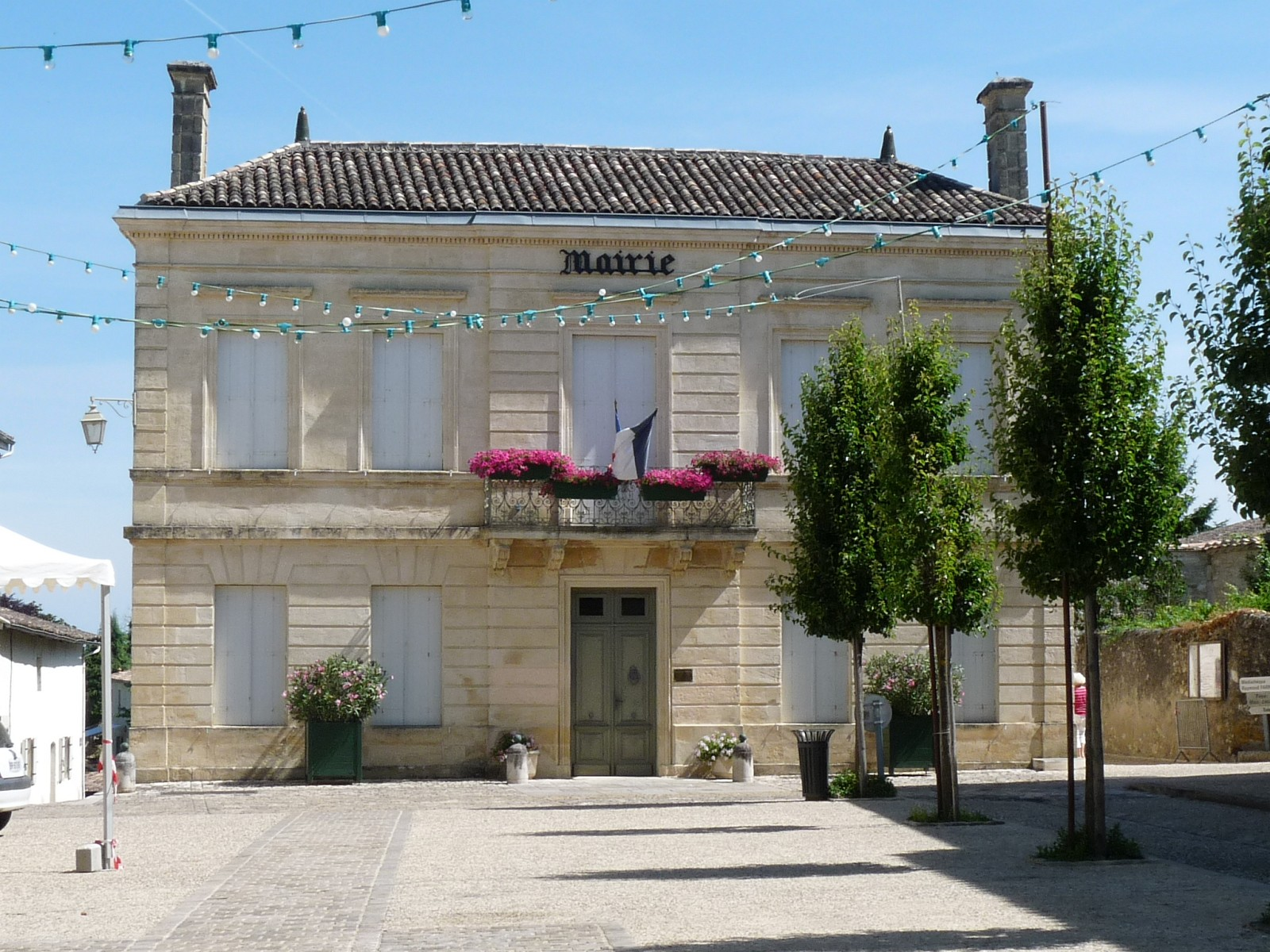
- The town hall in Gensac

- Coat of arms
- Location of Gensac
- Location within France Location within Nouvelle-Aquitaine
- Coordinates: 44°48′24″N 0°04′25″E
- Country: France
- Region: Nouvelle-Aquitaine
- Department: Gironde
- Arrondissement: Libourne
- Canton: Les Coteaux de Dordogne
- Intercommunality: Castillon Pujols

Government
  - Mayor (2020–2026): Patrice Pauletto
- Area^{1}: 9.38 km^{2} (3.62 sq mi)
- Elevation: 70 m (230 ft)
- Highest elevation: 115 m (377 ft)
- Lowest elevation: 15 m (49 ft)
- Population (2023): 687
  - Density: 73.2/km^{2} (190/sq mi)
- Time zone: UTC+01:00 (CET)
  - Summer (DST): UTC+02:00 (CEST)
- INSEE/Postal code: 33186 /33890
- ^{1} French Land Register data, which excludes lakes, ponds, glaciers > 1 km^{2} (0.386 sq mi or 247 acres) and river estuaries.

Gensac is a commune in the Gironde department in southwestern France.

== Population ==
Historical population
Year	Pop.	±% p.a.
1968	842	—
1975	848	+0.10%
1982	810	−0.65%
1990	752	−0.92%
1999	800	+0.69%
2007	849	+0.75%
2012	848	−0.02%
2017	771	−1.89%
2023	687	−1.90%
Source: INSEE

== See also ==
- Communes of the Gironde department
