= Gabarnac =

- Commune
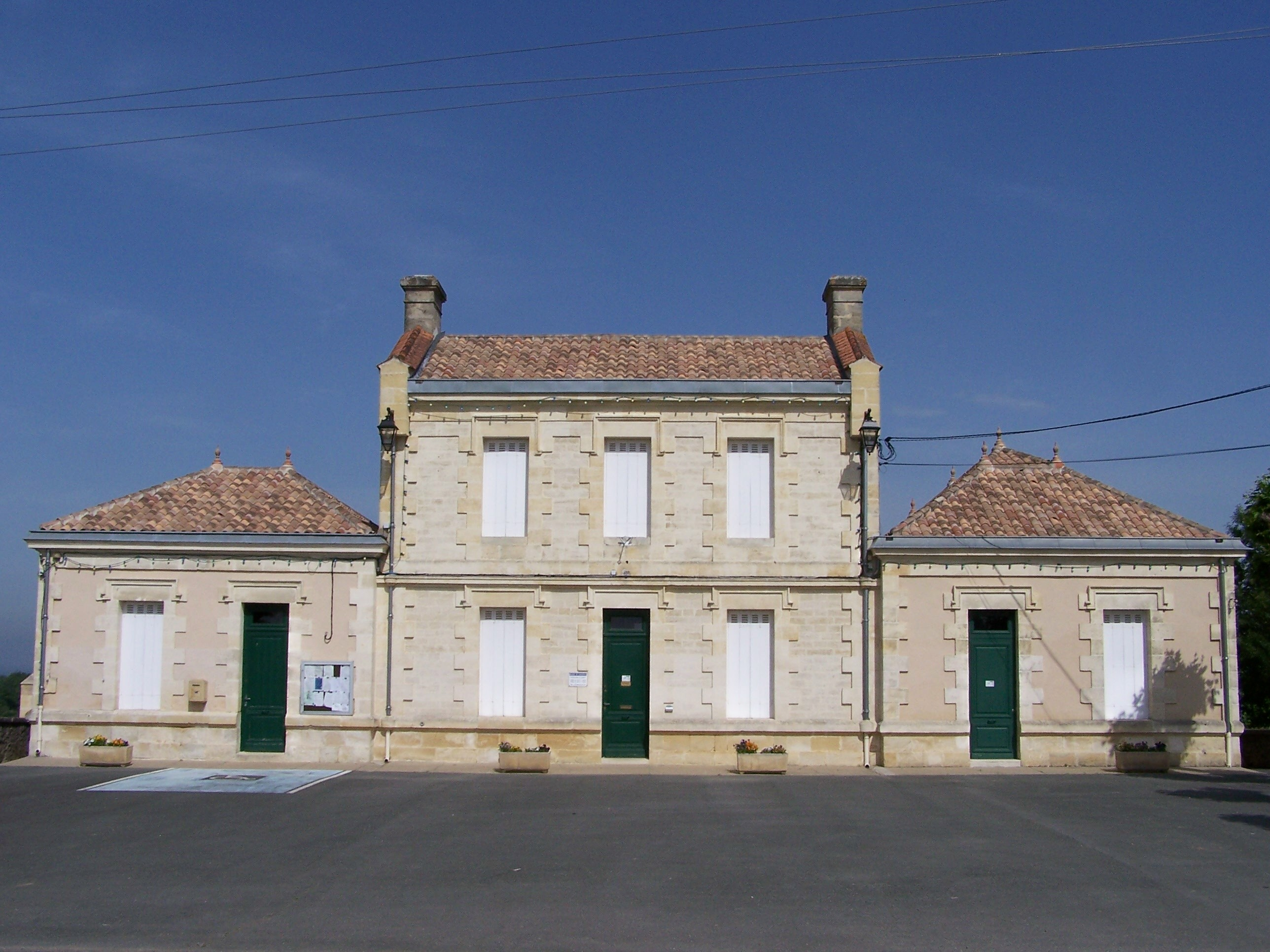
- Town hall
- Location of Gabarnac
- Location within France Location within Nouvelle-Aquitaine
- Coordinates: 44°36′58″N 0°16′03″W
- Country: France
- Region: Nouvelle-Aquitaine
- Department: Gironde
- Arrondissement: Langon
- Canton: L'Entre-Deux-Mers
- Intercommunality: Convergence Garonne

Government
  - Mayor (2020–2026): André Massieu
- Area^{1}: 5.21 km^{2} (2.01 sq mi)
- Highest elevation: 120 m (390 ft)
- Lowest elevation: 24 m (79 ft)
- Population (2023): 363
  - Density: 69.7/km^{2} (180/sq mi)
- Time zone: UTC+01:00 (CET)
  - Summer (DST): UTC+02:00 (CEST)
- INSEE/Postal code: 33176 /33410
- ^{1} French Land Register data, which excludes lakes, ponds, glaciers > 1 km^{2} (0.386 sq mi or 247 acres) and river estuaries.

Gabarnac (French pronunciation: [ɡabaʁnak]; Gascon: Gavarnac) is a commune in the Gironde department in southwestern France.

== Population ==
Historical population
| Year | Pop. | ±% p.a. |
|---|---|---|
| 1968 | 317 | — |
| 1975 | 275 | −2.01% |
| 1982 | 268 | −0.37% |
| 1990 | 273 | +0.23% |
| 1999 | 266 | −0.29% |
| 2007 | 285 | +0.87% |
| 2012 | 327 | +2.79% |
| 2017 | 365 | +2.22% |
| 2023 | 363 | −0.09% |
Source: INSEE

== See also ==
- Communes of the Gironde department
