= Néac =

- Commune
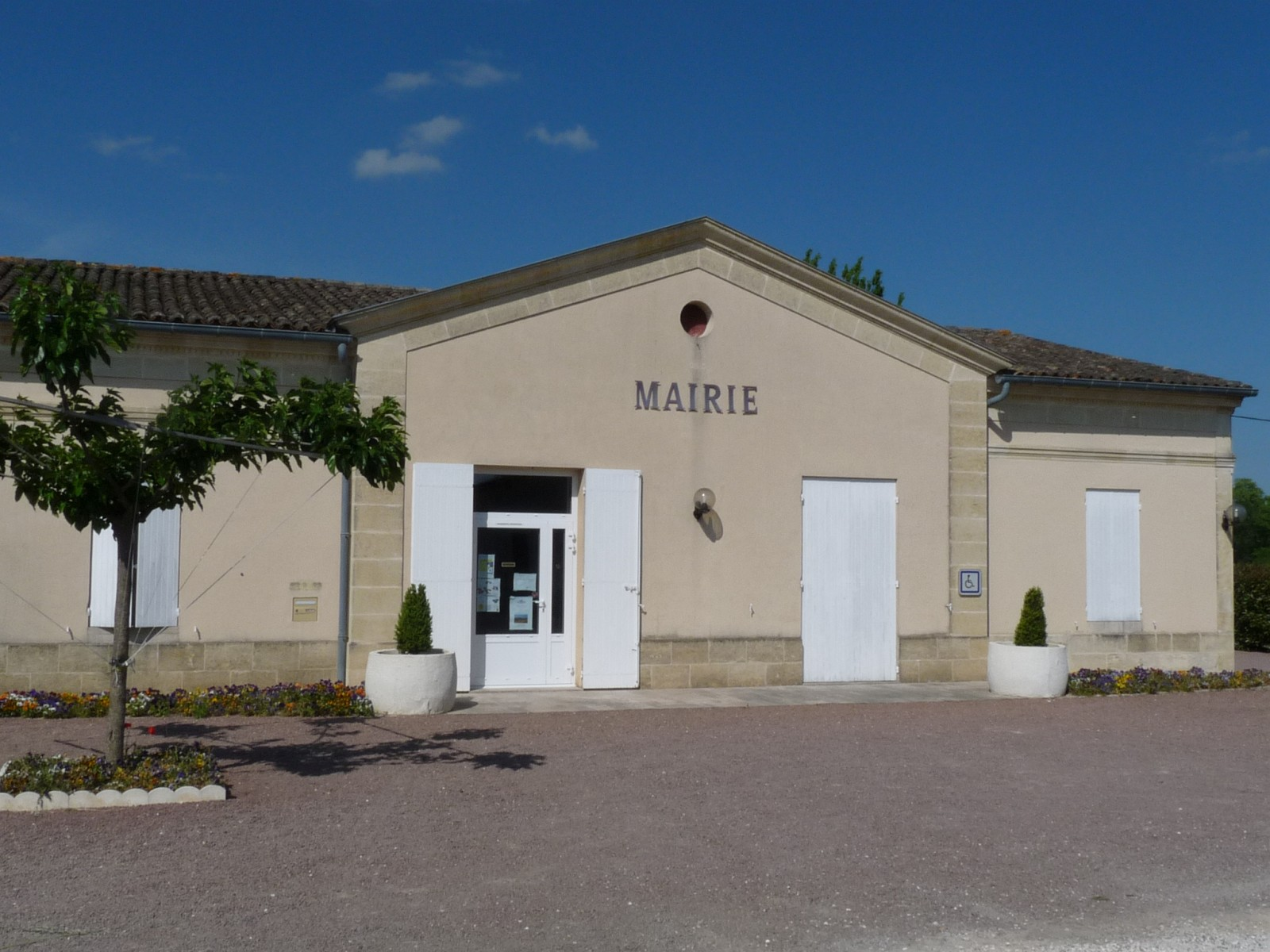
- The town hall in Néac
- Location of Néac
- Location within France Location within Nouvelle-Aquitaine
- Coordinates: 44°56′12″N 0°10′54″W
- Country: France
- Region: Nouvelle-Aquitaine
- Department: Gironde
- Arrondissement: Libourne
- Canton: Le Nord-Libournais

Government
  - Mayor (2020–2026): Patrick Fourreau
- Area^{1}: 6.88 km^{2} (2.66 sq mi)
- Highest elevation: 54 m (177 ft)
- Lowest elevation: 10 m (33 ft)
- Population (2023): 331
  - Density: 48.1/km^{2} (125/sq mi)
- Time zone: UTC+01:00 (CET)
  - Summer (DST): UTC+02:00 (CEST)
- INSEE/Postal code: 33302 /33500
- ^{1} French Land Register data, which excludes lakes, ponds, glaciers > 1 km^{2} (0.386 sq mi or 247 acres) and river estuaries.

Néac (French pronunciation: [neak]) is a commune in the Gironde department in Nouvelle-Aquitaine in southwestern France.

== Population ==
Historical population
Year	Pop.	±% p.a.
1968	548	—
1975	508	−1.08%
1982	509	+0.03%
1990	463	−1.18%
1999	403	−1.53%
2007	407	+0.12%
2012	392	−0.75%
2017	386	−0.31%
2023	331	−2.53%
Source: INSEE

== Communication ==
At Néac, there is a medium-wave broadcasting station which broadcasts at 1206 kHz with 300 kW.

== See also ==
- Communes of the Gironde department
