= Gilles Savary =

French politician (born 1954)

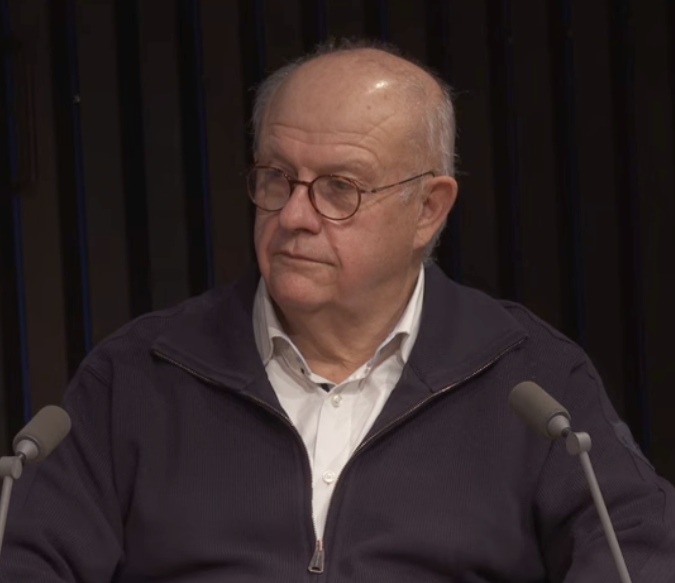
- In a 2026 interview

Member of the National Assembly of France
- In office 2012–2017
- Constituency: Gironde's 9th

Member of the European Parliament
- In office 1999–2009
- Constituency: Île-de-France

Personal details
- Born: 6 December 1954 (age 71) Oradour-sur-Vayres, Haute-Vienne, France
- Party: Socialist (1988–2020); Democrats and Progressives (2020–2022)
- Education: University of Bordeaux
- Awards: Ordre national du Mérite (1999)

Gilles Savary (born 6 December 1954) is a French politician who served as Member of the European Parliament for the Île-de-France.

== Early life and education ==
Savary holds a master's degree in economics (1975), a postgraduate diploma (DESS) in regional planning (1976) and a postgraduate diploma (DEA) in regional and urban analysis (1977) from the University of Bordeaux.

== Early career ==
Savary began his career as an advisor in the cabinets of Philippe Madrelle, president of the Regional Council of Aquitaine, from 1982 to 1985, and later of Jean-Michel Baylet, president of the Tarn-et-Garonne General Council from 1985 to 1987. He followed the latter when he became Secretary of State for Local Authorities at the Ministry of the Interior under minister Pierre Joxe after the 1988 elections. From 1988 to 1992, he was chief of staff to Madrelle, then president of the Departmental Council of Gironde.

From 1992 to 1999, Savary was a visiting lecturer in economics at the Sciences Po Bordeaux.

== Political career ==
- Leader of the Socialist Group on Bordeaux City Council (1995–2004)
- Member of the Socialist Party national council (since 1997)
- Vice-Chairman of the National Federation of Socialist and Republican Elected Representatives (1997–2001)
- Vice-Chairman of the Aquitaine Regional Council (1998–1999)
- National responsibility in the Socialist Party for public services (2001–2003)
- Vice-Chairman of the Gironde Departmental Council (since 2004)

=== Member of the European Parliament, 1999–2009 ===
As a member of the Socialist Party, Savary served as part of the Party of European Socialists. In parliament, he was vice-chair of the European Parliament's Committee on Transport and Tourism (2002–2009) and a member of the temporary committee on improving safety at sea (2003–2004). He was also a substitute for the Committee on Economic and Monetary Affairs.

In addition to his committee assignments, Savary was a member of the delegations for relations with Iran (2004–2009) and to the parliamentary cooperation committees for relations with Armenia, Azerbaijan and Georgia (1999–2002). He also chaired the Intergroup on the Sky and Space from 2000 to 2004.

From 2006, Savary was one of the spokespeople of Ségolène Royal's campaign for the 2007 presidential election, alongside Arnaud Montebourg and Jean-Louis Bianco.

=== Member of the National Assembly, 2012–2017 ===
Following the 2012 elections, Savary became the deputy for Gironde's 9th constituency. In parliament, he served on the Committee on Sustainable Development, Spatial and Regional Planning and the Committee on European Affairs.

In addition to his committee assignments, Savary was part of the French-Turkish Parliamentary Friendship Group, the French-Polish Parliamentary Friendship Group and the French-Algerian Parliamentary Friendship Group from 2014 to 2017.

When Benoît Hamon won the Socialist Party's primaries to become its candidate for the 2017 presidential elections, Savary and Christophe Caresche wrote an article in Le Monde newspaper saying they could not support him.

=== Later career ===
From 2020 to 2021, Savary served as chair of Territories of Progress, a party he had co-founded but eventually left in 2022. He has since been supporting La Convention, a political movement founded by Bernard Cazeneuve.

== Other activities ==
- Banque de France, Member of the General Council (since 2020)
- French transport infrastructure financing agency (AFITF), Member of the Board of Directors (2014–2017)
- French National Railway Safety Authority (EPSF), Member of the Board of Directors (2012–2017)

== Recognition ==
- Knight of the Ordre national du Mérite (1999)
