= Gironde's 9th constituency =

Constituency of the National Assembly of France

9th constituency of Gironde
- inline Constituency of the National Assembly of France

- Location of constituency in Department

- Location of Gironde in France
- Deputy: Sophie Mette; MoDem
- Department: Gironde
- Cantons: (pre-2015) Auros, Cadillac, Créon, Langon, Monségur, Podensac, Réole, Saint-Macaire, Sauveterre-de-Guyenne, Targon.

The 9th constituency of the Gironde (French: Neuvième circonscription de la Gironde) is a French legislative constituency in Gironde département. Like the other 576 French constituencies, it elects one MP using the two-round system, with a run-off if no candidate receives over 50% of the vote in the first round.

== Historical representation ==
Election	Member	Party
1988	Pierre Lagorce	PS
1993	Philippe Dubourg	RPR
1997	Odette Trupin	PS
2002	Philippe Dubourg	UMP
2007	Martine Faure	PS
2012	Gilles Savary	PS
2017	Sophie Mette	MoDem
2022	Sophie Mette	MoDem
2022	Sophie Mette	MoDem

== Election results ==
=== 2024 ===
Candidate	Party	Alliance	First round			Second round		
Candidate	Party	Alliance	Votes	%	+/–	Votes	%	+/–
François-Xavier Marques	RN		27,868	38.54	+15.10	30,337	43.01	new
Sophie Mette	MoDEM	Ensemble	21,714	30.03	+1.28	40,190	56.99	+6.50
Corinne Martinez	PS	NFP	20,163	27.89	+3.66			
Jean-Philippe Delcamp	LO		1,368	1.89	+0.33			
Sylvie Mantel	REC		1,188	1.64	-2.53			
Votes			72,301	100.00		70,527	100.00	
Valid votes			72,301	96.45	-0.70	70,527	94.32	+4.64
Blank votes			1,885	2.51	+0.42	3,077	4.12	-3.22
Null votes			776	1.04	+0.28	1,167	1.56	-1.42
Turnout			74,962	72.19	+20.57	74,771	71.98	+22.38
Abstentions			28,885	27.81	-20.57	29,106	28.02	-22.38
Registered voters			103,847			103,877		
Result			MoDEM HOLD					

=== 2022 ===
Legislative Election 2022: Gironde's 9th constituency
Party	Candidate	Votes	%	±%
MoDem (Ensemble)	Sophie Mette	14,732	28.75	-2.46
LFI (NUPÉS)	Sacha Andre	12,415	24.23	-14.02
RN	Damien Obrador	12,008	23.44	+10.99
PRG	Serge Detrieux	3,074	6.00	N/A
LR (UDC)	René Cardoit	2,802	5.47	−7.53
REC	Sylvie Mantel	2,136	4.17	N/A
LMR	Armelle Cruse	1,123	2.19	N/A
Others	N/A	2,946	5.75	
Turnout		51,236	51.62	−0.55
2nd round result
MoDem (Ensemble)	Sophie Mette	22,950	50.49	-3.05
LFI (NUPÉS)	Sacha Andre	22,506	49.51	+3.05
Turnout		45,456	49.60	+7.11
MoDem hold				

=== 2017 ===
Candidate	Label	First round		Second round	
Candidate	Label	Votes	%	Votes	%
Sophie Mette	MoDem	14,888	31.21	18,059	53.54
Gilles Savary	PS	8,289	17.38	15,674	46.46
François Papiau	FI	6,844	14.35		
Michel Dufranc	LR	6,201	13.00		
Sophie Rivière Durivault	FN	5,938	12.45		
Dominique Baude	ECO	2,130	4.47		
Cristine Guerné	PCF	977	2.05		
Rémy Berthonneau	DLF	952	2.00		
Jean-Philippe Delcamp	EXG	442	0.93		
Antoine Courjaud	DVG	362	0.76		
Fanny Loustau	DIV	339	0.71		
Xavier de Jaeger	DIV	326	0.68		
Patrick Dhersin	ECO	12	0.03		
Votes		47,700	100.00	33,733	100.00
Valid votes		47,700	97.69	33,733	84.81
Blank votes		784	1.61	4,031	10.14
Null votes		344	0.70	2,009	5.05
Turnout		48,828	52.17	39,773	42.49
Abstentions		44,766	47.83	53,825	57.51
Registered voters		93,594		93,598	
Source: Ministry of the Interior

=== 2012 ===
2012 legislative election in Gironde's 9th constituency
Candidate	Party	First round		Second round	
Candidate	Party	Votes	%	Votes	%
Gilles Savary	PS	21,253	40.88%	30,429	63.49%
Maxime Sibe	UMP	12,077	23.23%	17,497	36.51%
Pierre Augey	FG	6,437	12.38%		
Valérie Colombier	FN	5,896	11.34%		
Sophie Mette	MoDem	1,969	3.79%		
Yann Persillon	EELV	1,806	3.47%		
Gaël Leroux	CPNT	814	1.57%		
Guillaume Besset	AEI	420	0.81%		
Martine Hostier	DLR	389	0.75%		
Hervé Riou	NPA	329	0.63%		
Jean-Philippe Delcamp	LO	306	0.59%		
Alain Jeanmougin	PP	211	0.41%		
Gérard Laguerie	AR	86	0.17%		
Valid votes		51,993	98.32%	47,926	95.76%
Spoilt and null votes		888	1.68%	2,124	4.24%
Votes cast / turnout		52,881	61.73%	50,050	58.42%
Abstentions		32,779	38.27%	35,630	41.58%
Registered voters		85,660	100.00%	85,680	100.00%

=== 2007 ===
Legislative Election 2007: Gironde's 9th constituency
Party	Candidate	Votes	%	±%
UMP	Philippe Dubourg	19,891	31.41	
PS	Martine Faure	19,250	30.39	
MoDem	Philippe Meynard	5,942	9.38	
PCF	Pierre Augey	5,363	8.47	
NM	Raoul Orsoni	3,319	5.24	
FN	Mireille De Badereau	2,284	3.61	
LV	Julie Laernoes	2,034	3.21	
Far left	Samuel Vimeney	1,602	2.53	
CPNT	Vincent Graule	1,534	2.42	
Others	N/A	2,117		
Turnout		64,412	65.19	
2nd round result
PS	Martine Faure	35,561	55.80	
UMP	Philippe Dubourg	28,172	44.20	
Turnout		65,652	66.45	
PS gain from UMP				

=== 2002 ===
Legislative Election 2002: Gironde's 9th constituency
Party	Candidate	Votes	%	±%
UMP	Philippe Dubourg	20,783	33.65	
PS	Odette Trupin	17,833	28.87	
PCF	Pierre Augey	7,643	12.37	
FN	Mireille de Badereau	5,824	9.43	
CPNT	Christine Frechou	3,259	5.28	
LV	Anne-Marie Fremond	2,060	3.34	
MNR	Alain de Peretti	1,385	2.24	
Others	N/A	2,981		
Turnout		63,069	69.24	
2nd round result
UMP	Philippe Dubourg	28,431	50.28	
PS	Odette Trupin	28,118	49.72	
Turnout		59,449	65.26	
UMP gain from PS				

=== 1997 ===
Legislative Election 1997:
Party	Candidate	Votes	%	±%
RPR	Philippe Dubourg	17,782	29.42	
PS	Odette Trupin	16,073	26.59	
PCF	Pierre Augey	10,861	17.97	
FN	Alain de Peretti	7,945	13.14	
LV	Dominique Hoffmann	1,664	2.75	
DVD	Claire Laguerie	1,449	2.40	
Others	N/A	4,678		
Turnout		63,550	73.42	
2nd round result
PS	Odette Trupin	35,182	55.86	
RPR	Philippe Dubourg	27,798	44.14	
Turnout		66,831	77.21	
PS gain from RPR				
