= Aillas =

- Commune
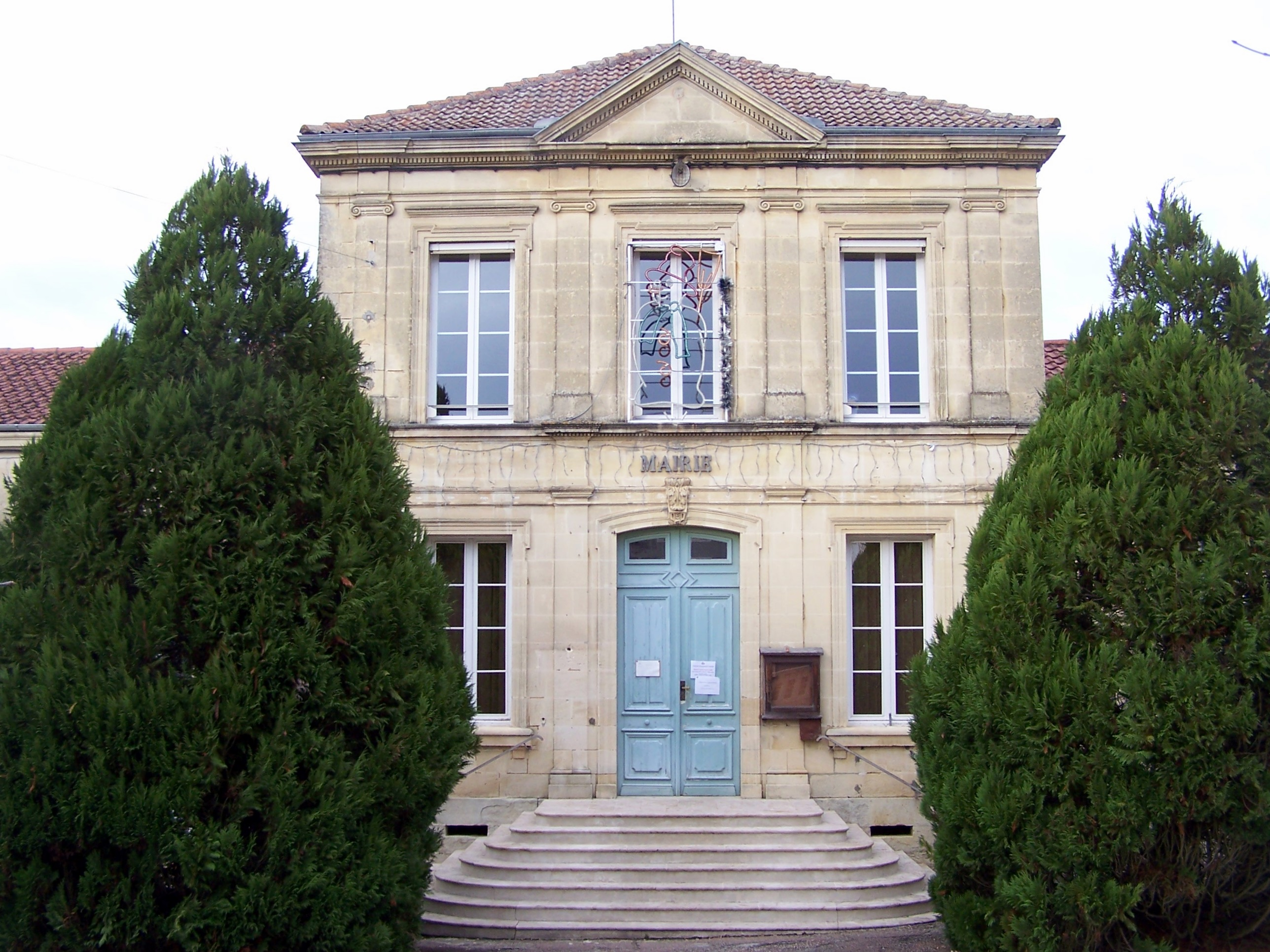
- Aillas Town hall
- Location of Aillas
- Location within France Location within Nouvelle-Aquitaine
- Coordinates: 44°28′30″N 0°04′23″W
- Country: France
- Region: Nouvelle-Aquitaine
- Department: Gironde
- Arrondissement: Langon
- Canton: Le Réolais et Les Bastides
- Intercommunality: Réolais en Sud Gironde

Government
  - Mayor (2020–2026): André-Marc Barnett
- Area^{1}: 35.13 km^{2} (13.56 sq mi)
- Elevation: 64 m (210 ft)
- Highest elevation: 138 m (453 ft)
- Lowest elevation: 29 m (95 ft)
- Population (2023): 786
  - Density: 22.4/km^{2} (57.9/sq mi)
- Time zone: UTC+01:00 (CET)
  - Summer (DST): UTC+02:00 (CEST)
- INSEE/Postal code: 33002 /33124
- ^{1} French Land Register data, which excludes lakes, ponds, glaciers > 1 km^{2} (0.386 sq mi or 247 acres) and river estuaries.

Aillas (French pronunciation: [ajas]; Occitan: Alhats) is a commune of the Gironde department in southwestern France.

== Population ==
Historical population
| Year | Pop. | ±% p.a. |
|---|---|---|
| 1968 | 939 | — |
| 1975 | 790 | −2.44% |
| 1982 | 690 | −1.91% |
| 1990 | 656 | −0.63% |
| 1999 | 668 | +0.20% |
| 2007 | 732 | +1.15% |
| 2012 | 792 | +1.59% |
| 2017 | 822 | +0.75% |
| 2023 | 786 | −0.74% |
Source: INSEE

== See also ==
- Communes of the Gironde department
