= House of Nogaret de La Vallette =

French noble family

The House of Nogaret de La Valette, formerly Nogaret, was a ducal family of French nobility, originally from Lavalette (Haute-Garonne) in the Languedoc region. It died out in the 17th century.. The family was elevated to the ducal title four times (1581, 1611, 1621, 1622) and to the rank of Peer of France as early as 1581..

Jean-Louis de Nogaret de La Valette (1554–1642) was a confidant of King Henry III and a leading figure in the French nobility during the reigns of Henry III, Henry IV and Louis XIII.

The family produced two French admirals, multiple provincial governors, and two prelates.

== History ==
This family should not be confused with several more recent or older noble families of the same name, such as Guillaume de Nogaret (1260–1313).

The family is originally from Lavalette (Haute-Garonne) in the Languedoc region of France.

Its first known member was Jacques Nogaret, seigneur of La Valette (capital of Toulouse in 1366, 1377, and 1385) was recognized as a nobleman by letters of Charles V dated 1372.

Originally from Languedoc, this family settled in Gascony after settling near Lectoure, at the Château de Caumont-Cazaux built for Pierre de Nogaret de La Valette between 1530 and 1535.

The family's reputation at the French court began when Jean-Louis de Nogaret de La Valette was admitted as one of King Henry III's mignons. From then on, the family held a number of high offices, and was elevated to the title of ducal in 1581.

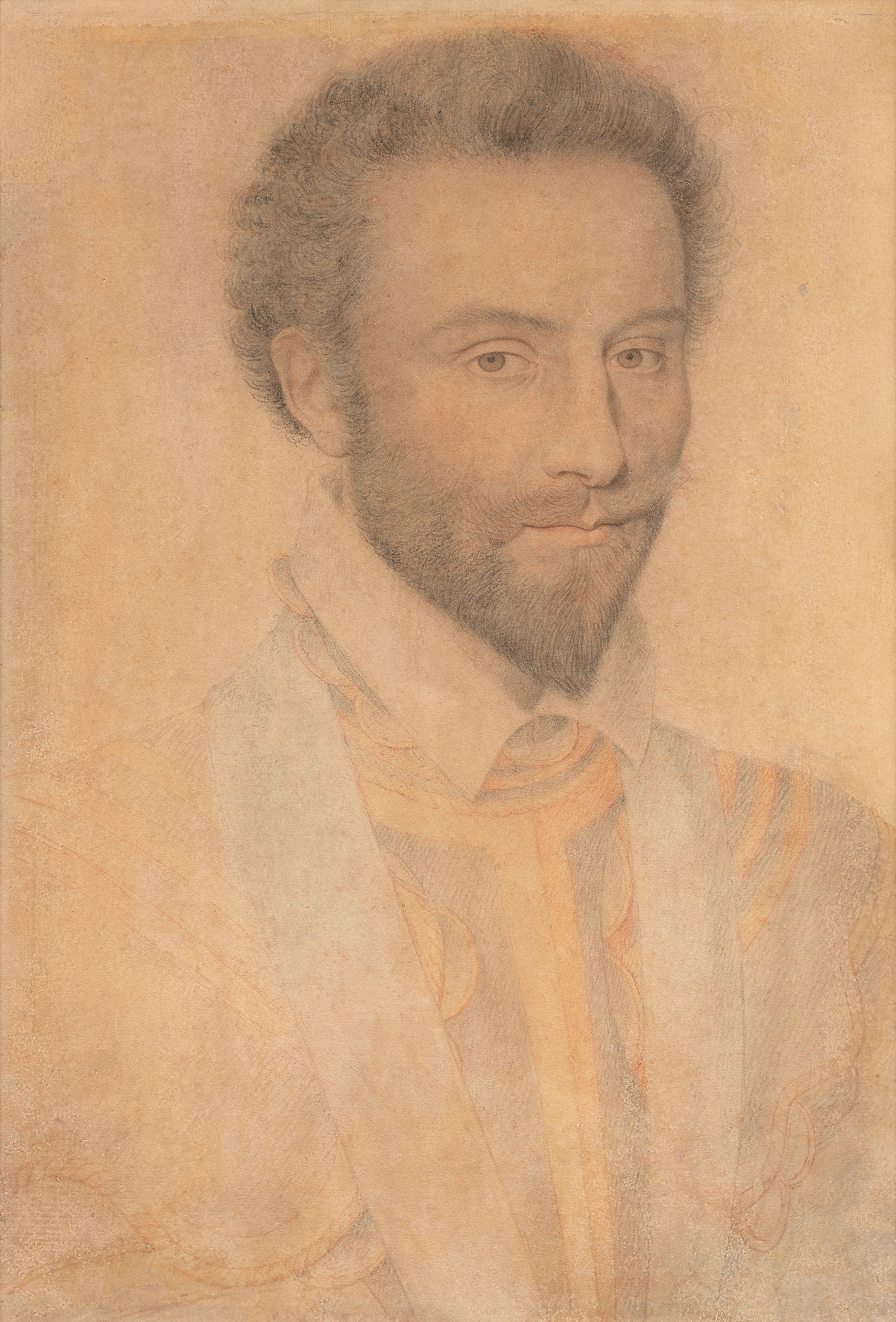
Bernard de Nogaret de La Valette (+ 1592)

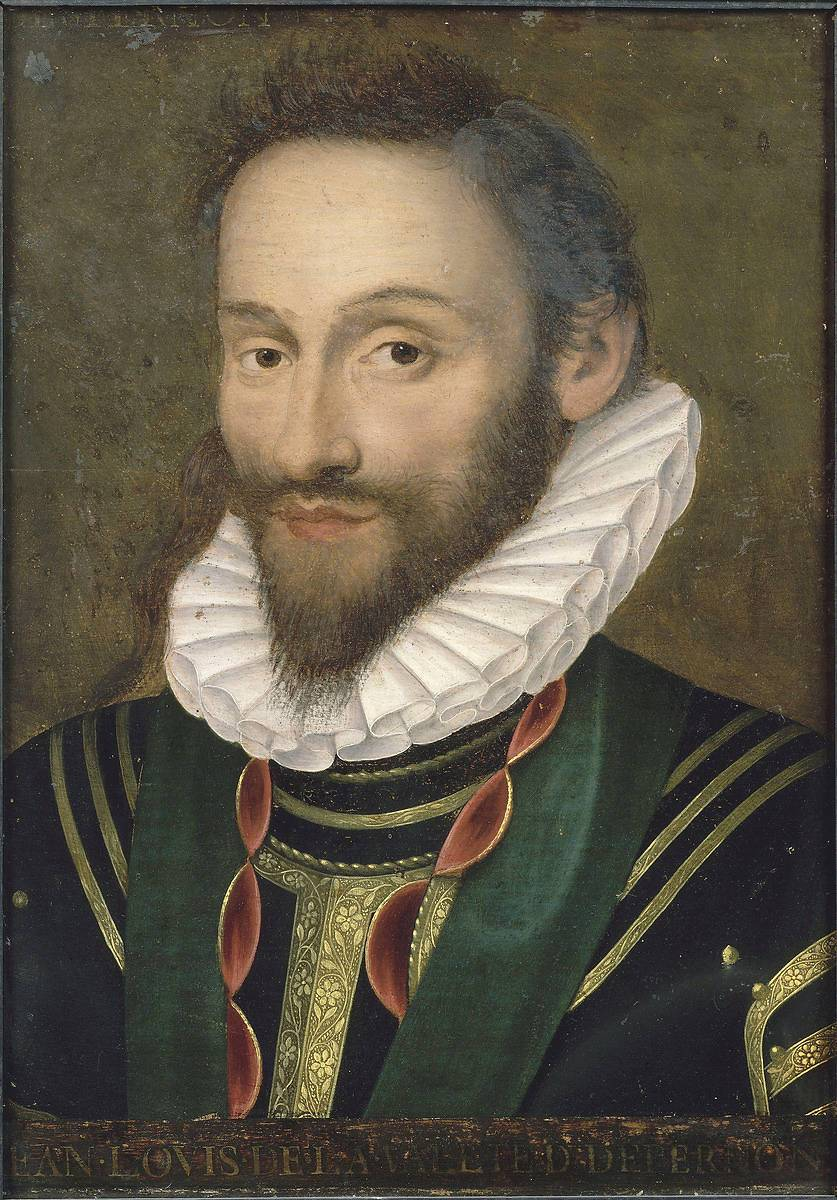
Jean-Louis de Nogaret de La Valette (1554–1642)

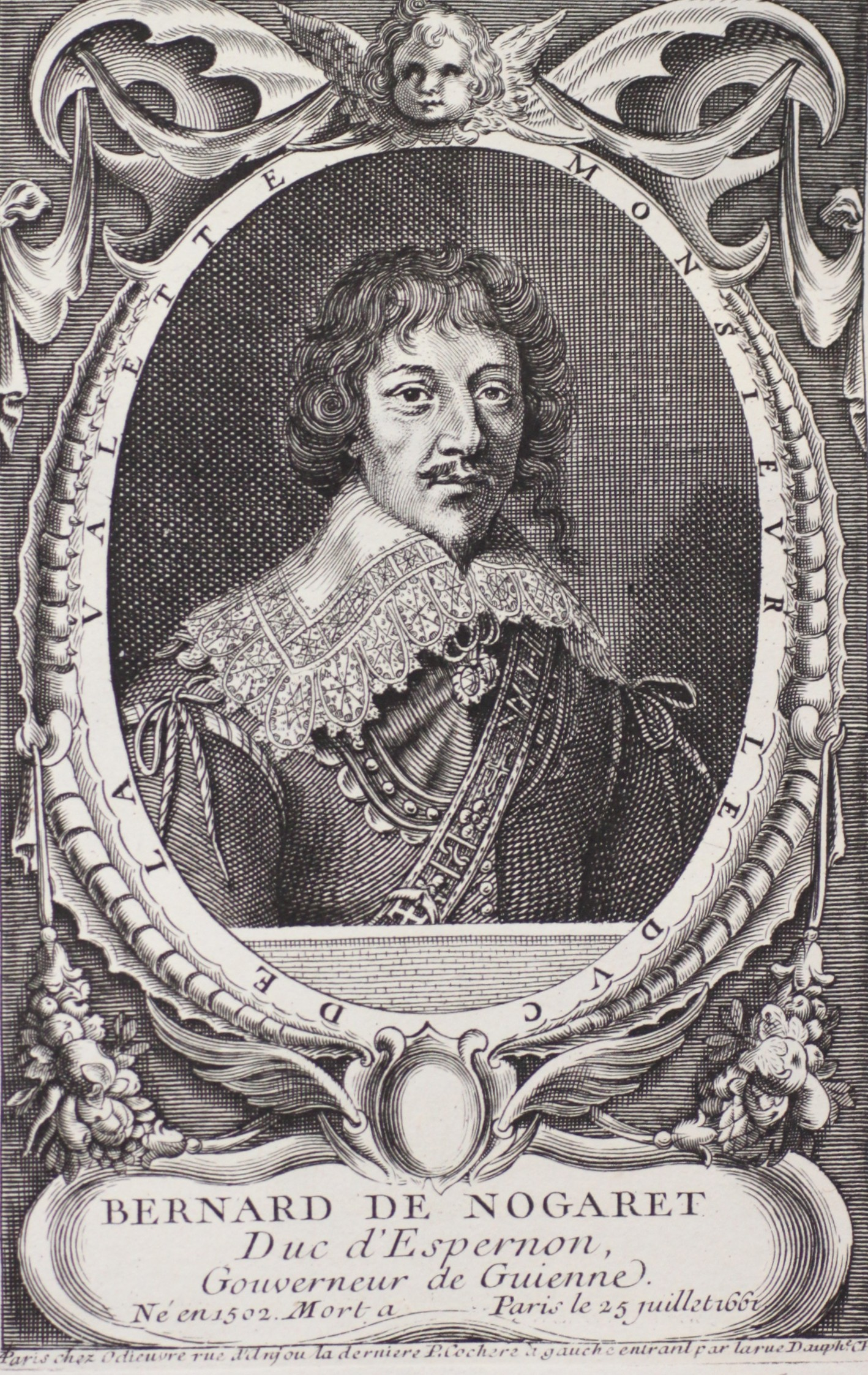
Bernard de Nogaret de La Valette (1592–1661)

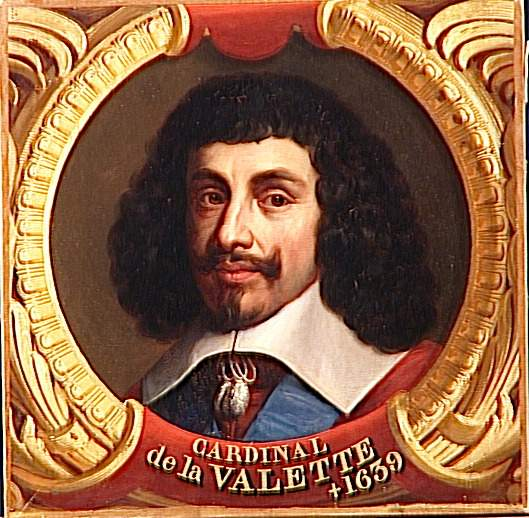
Louis de Nogaret de La Valette d'Épernon, cardinal of La Valette, archbishop of Toulouse (1593–1639)

- Pierre de Nogaret (?–1553), seigneur of La Valette, served in the Italian wars under King Fancis I, and married Marguerite de l'Isle, dame of Cazaux and of Caumont, daughter of Jean, seigneur of Saint-Aignan and Catherine de Galard, on April 21, 1521.; they had the Château de Caumont built by Toulouse architect Pierre Bachelier. Their sons:
  - Jean de Nogaret de La Valette (1527–1575), captain and maître de camp of light cavalry during the reign of King Charles IX and the regency of Catherine de Médicis, married in 1551 to Jeanne de Saint-Lary, with two sons and three daughters:
    - Bernard de Nogaret, seigneur of La Valette (1553 - 1592), knight of the Order of the Holy Spirit (received on December 31, 1583), admiral of France following his brother (in 1590), governor and lieutenant-general for the king in Provence.
    - Jean-Louis de Nogaret (1554–1642), duke of Épernon and of La Valette, colonel general of the infantry and admiral of France, knight of the Order of the Holy Spirit (received on December 31, 1582). Along with the Duke of Joyeuse, he was one of King Henry III's mignons. Governor of La Fère, State Councillor, First Gentleman of the King's Chamber, Governor of Boulonnais and Loches, Metz and Pays messin, Lyon Citadel, Governor of Angoumois, Aunis, Saintonge, and Provence, Military Governor of Guyenne, Governor of Normandy, Caen, and Le Havre. He was feared by Cardinal Richelieu. Every morning at six o'clock, until the French Revolution, a small bell rang out Épernon's cries for the repose of his soul. Married to Marguerite de Foix-Candale, with three legitimate sons and one illegitimate son:
      - Henry de Nogaret de La Valette (1591–1639), duke of Halluin and peer by marriage in 1611, duke of Candale in 1621, knight of the Order of the Garter, no descendants. He was hated by Cardinal Richelieu.
      - Bernard de Nogaret de La Valette (1592–1661), marquis then duke of La Valette, colonel general of the infantry, governor of Guyenne and Burgundy. In 1622, he married Gabrielle-Angélique de Bourbon, natural daughter of King Henry IV and Henriette de Balzac, in Lyon, France:
        - Louis-Charles de Nogaret de Foix (1627–1658), duke of La Valette and of Candale, peer of France, colonel general of infantry, governor and lieutenant general of Burgundy, Bresse, and Auvergne. No marriage.
      - Louis de Nogaret de La Valette d'Épernon (1593–1639), archbishop of Toulouse, created cardinal in 1621, lieutenant-general of the king's armies
      - Louis de Nogaret de La Valette (?–1679) (natural son of Jean-Louis de Nogaret de La Valette), bishop of Mirepoix and Carcassonne

== Alliances ==
The main alliances of the House of Nogaret de La Valette are:

- du Fossat,
- de Bonafos,
- de Saint-Maurice,
- de Villeneuve,
- de Lye,
- de Bertolène,
- de Tournemire,
- de Bérail,
- de La Valette-Cornusson,
- de L'Isle,
- de Saint-Lary de Bellegarde,
- de Montlezun,
- de Foix-Candale,
- de Bourbon,
- de Joyeuse,
- de Moÿ,
- de Goth.

== Possessions, titles ==
- Château de Cadillac
- Château de Villebois-Lavalette
- Seigneur of La Valette, then marquess of La Valette in 1607
- Seigneur of Cazaux-Caumont near Lectoure, built by Pierre de Nogaret de La Valette between 1530 and 1535.
- Duke of Épernon and peer of France in 1581
- Count of Candale then Duke of Candale and peer of France
- Count of Astarac
- Captal de Buch
- Duke of Hallwin and peer of France
- Duke of La Valette and peer of France in 1622
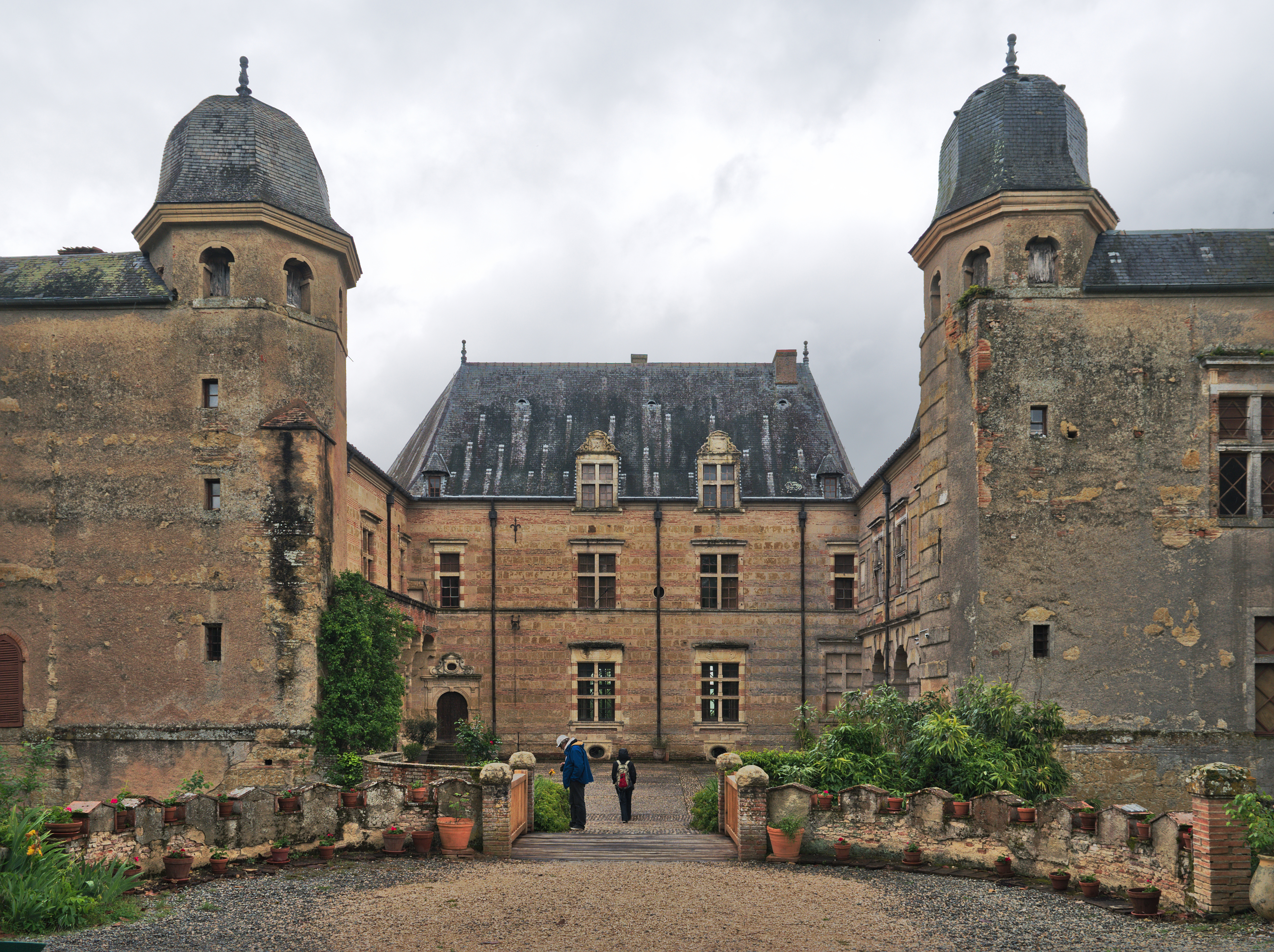
Château de Caumont (Gers).

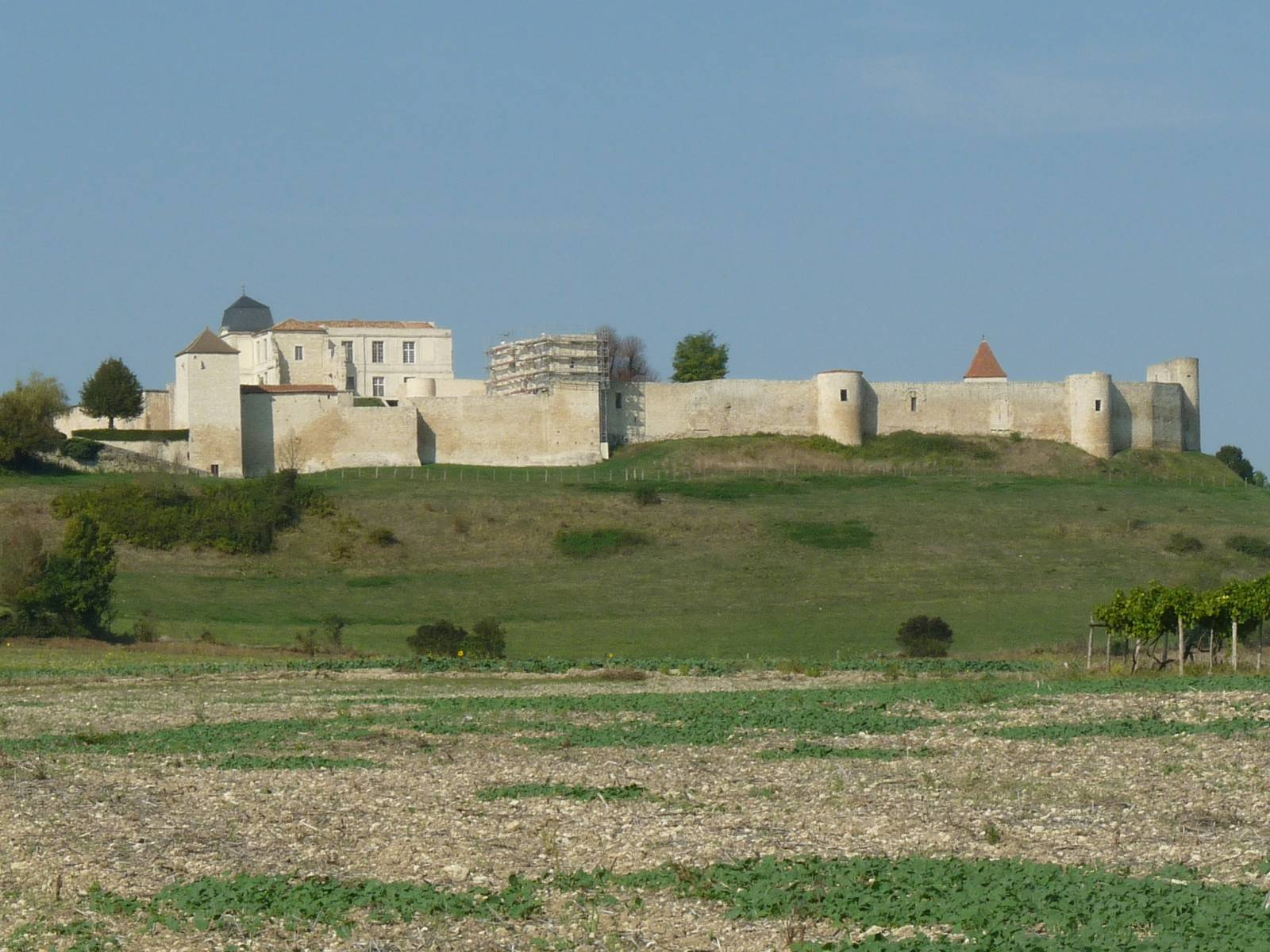
Château de Villebois-Lavalette and the ramparts seen from the southeast (Charente).

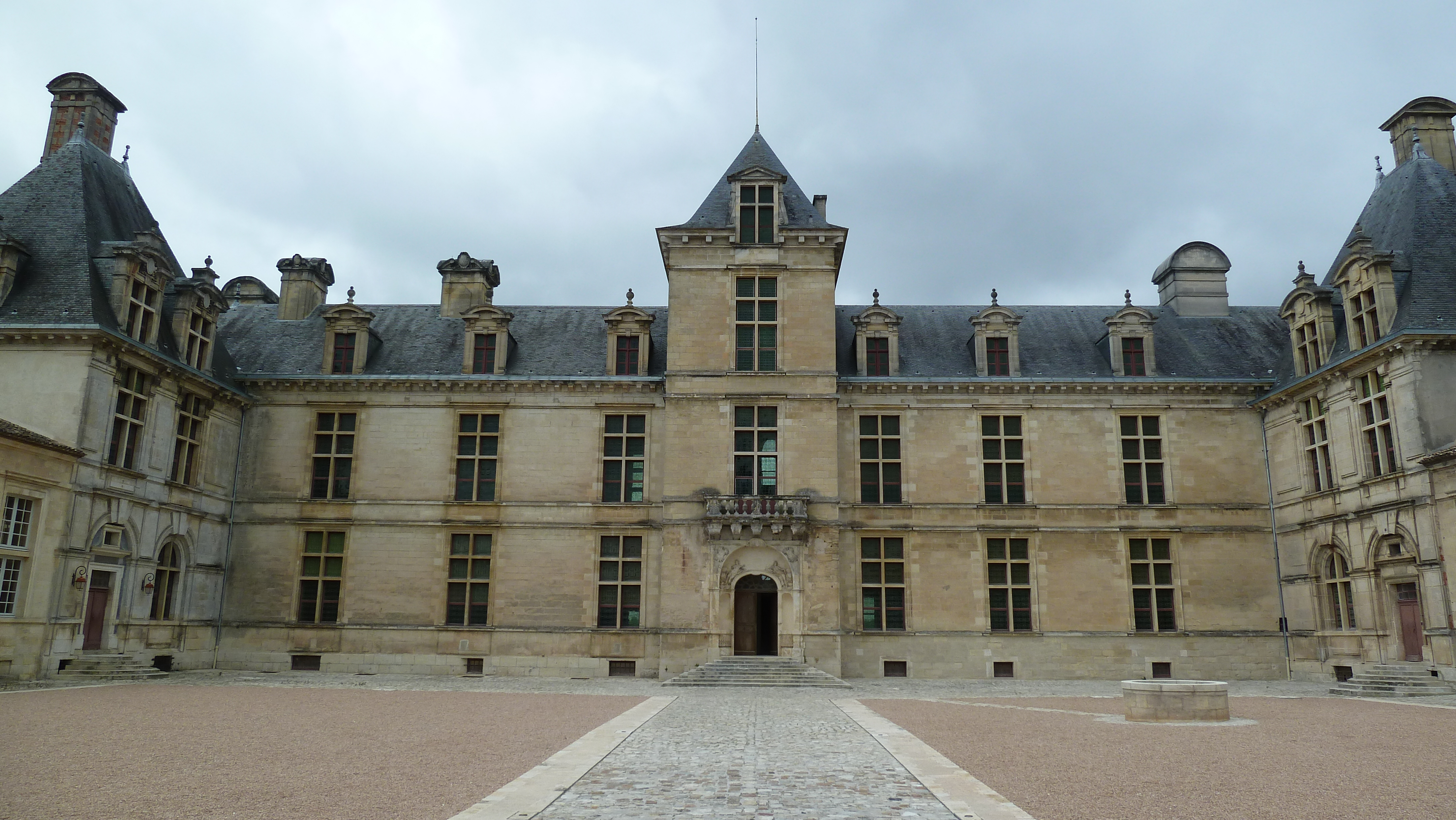
Château de Cadillac, view from the inner courtyard (Gironde).

Image	Armoiries de la maison de Nogaret de La Valette
	Henry de Nogaret de "Foix" (1591–1639), comte de Candale et captal de Buch, puis duc d'Hallwin et pair de France, puis duc de Candale et pair de France, chevalier du Saint-Esprit (reçu le 14 mai 1633) Écartelé : au I, contre-écartelé en 1 et 4, de gueules au château d'or ouvert et ajouré d'azur (de Castille), en 2 et 3 d'argent au lion de pourpre armé, lampassé et couronné d'or (de León) ; au II, écartelé en 1 et 4, de gueules aux chaînes d'or posées en orle, en croix et en sautoir, chargées en cœur d'une émeraude au naturel (de Navarre), en 2 et 3 écartelé en sautoir d'or aux quatre pals de gueules (d'Aragon) et d'argent à l'aigle de sable (Hohenstaufen) (le tout de Sicile) ; au III contre-écartelé en 1 et 4 d'azur aux trois fleurs de lys d'or et en 2 et 3 de gueules (d'Albret) ; au IV parti en a, d'azur semé de fleurs de lys d'or à la bande componée d'argent et de gueules (d'Évreux), en b, parti d'argent à un noyer arraché de sinople et de gueules, à la croix d'or, alaisée, vidée, cléchée et pommetée de douze pièces ; au chef de gueules chargé d'une croix potencée d'argent (de Nogaret) ; sur-le-tout, écartelé en 1 et 4 d'or aux trois pals de gueules (de Foix) en 2 et 3 d'or aux deux vaches de gueules, accornées, colletées et clarinées d'azur, passant l'une sur l'autre (de Béarn). On trouve aussi Écartelé: au 1, contre-écartelé: a. et d. de gueules à un château de trois tours d'or (Castille); b. et c. d'argent au lion de gueules, couronné d'or (Léon); au 2, contre-écartelé: a. et d. de gueules aux chaînes de Navarre d'or (Navarre); b. et c. écartelé en sautoir, d'or à quatre pals de gueules, et d'argent à l'aigle de sable (Aragon-Sicile) ; au 3, de gueules plein (d'Albret) ; au 4, parti: a. d'azur semé de fleurs-de-lis d'or, à la bande componnée d'argent et de gueules, brochant sur les fleurs-de-lis (Evreux); b. à un noyer de sinople, et au chef de gueules, ch. d'une croix potencée d'argent (Nogaret). Sur le tout écartelé: a. et d. d'or à trois pals de gueules (Foix); b. et c. d'or à deux vaches passantes de gueules, l'une sur l'autre, accornées, colletées et clarinées d'azur (Béarn).
	Bernard de Nogaret de La Valette (1592–1661), marquis de La Valette, puis duc de La Valette et pair de France, duc d'Épernon et pair de France, comte de Montfort, comte de Candale, comte d'Astarac, de Benauges et de Loches, vicomte de Castillon, captal de Buch et baron de Cadillac, colonel général de l'infanterie de France, chevalier de la Jarretière en 1645 (brevet № 444) Écartelé: au I. parti: au 1, contre-écartelé : a. et d. de gueules à un château de trois tours d'or (de Castille) ; b. et c. d'argent au lion de gueules (de León) ; au 2, de gueules, aux chaînes de Navarre d'or (de Navarre), au II. parti : au 1, d'or, à quatre pals de gueules (d'Aragon) ; au 2, écartelé en sautoir : a. et d. d'or à quatre pals de gueules (d'Aragon) ; b. et c. d'argent à l'aigle de sable (Hohenstaufen) (le tout de Sicile), au III. parti: au 1, burelé de sable et d'or, au crancelin de sinople, brochant en bande (de Saxe) ; au 2, d'or plein, au IV. parti : au 1, contre-écartelé : a. et d. d'azur à la fasce d'or, acc. de trois têtes de lion ou rencontres de lions (voir de chats ??) du second (de Pole ?) ; b. et c. d'azur à la bande d'argent, ch. de trois vols de sable, posés dans le sens de la bande ; au 2, contre-écartelé : a. et d. d'or à trois pals de gueules (de Foix) ; b. et c. d'or à deux vaches passantes de gueules, l'une sur l'autre, accornées, colletées et clarinées d'azur (de Béarn). Sur le tout parti : a. d'argent à un noyer de sinople, terrassé du même (de Nogaret) ; b. de gueules à la croix cléchée, vidée et pommetée d'or (de L'Isle-Jourdain), et au chef de ce surtout de gueules, ch. d'une croix potencée d'argent. (d'après Rietstap : Sur le tout du tout d'azur à une cloche d'argent, bataillée de sable (Algoursan).
240px	Louis de Nogaret (1593–1639), cardinal de La Valette, archevêque de Toulouse, commandeur du Saint-Esprit (reçu le 14 mai 1633) Écartelé : aux I et IV, parti : au 1, d'argent à un noyer de sinople (de Nogaret), de gueules à la croix de Toulouse d'or (de L'Isle-Jourdain), à un chef de gueules chargé d'une croix potencée d'argent sur le tout ; aux II et III, contre écartelé : aux 1 et 4, d'or, à trois pals de gueules (de Foix), aux 2 et 3, d'or à deux vaches passantes de gueules, l'une sur l'autre, accornées, colletées et clarinées d'azur (de Béarn).

Today's coat of arms for the commune of Fontenay-Trésigny in the Seine-et-Marne region.

Image	Coat of Arms
	Fontenay-Trésigny (Seine-et-Marne) porte : Quarterly: in I, de Melun de la Borde; in II, de Nogaret de La Valette; in III, Le Tonnelier de Breteuil; in IV, de Noailles; overall gules, a silver door.

== See also ==
- Duke of Épernon
- Lavalette (Haute-Garonne)
- Villebois-Lavalette (Charente)
