= Cadillac AOC =

Cadillac
- Wine region
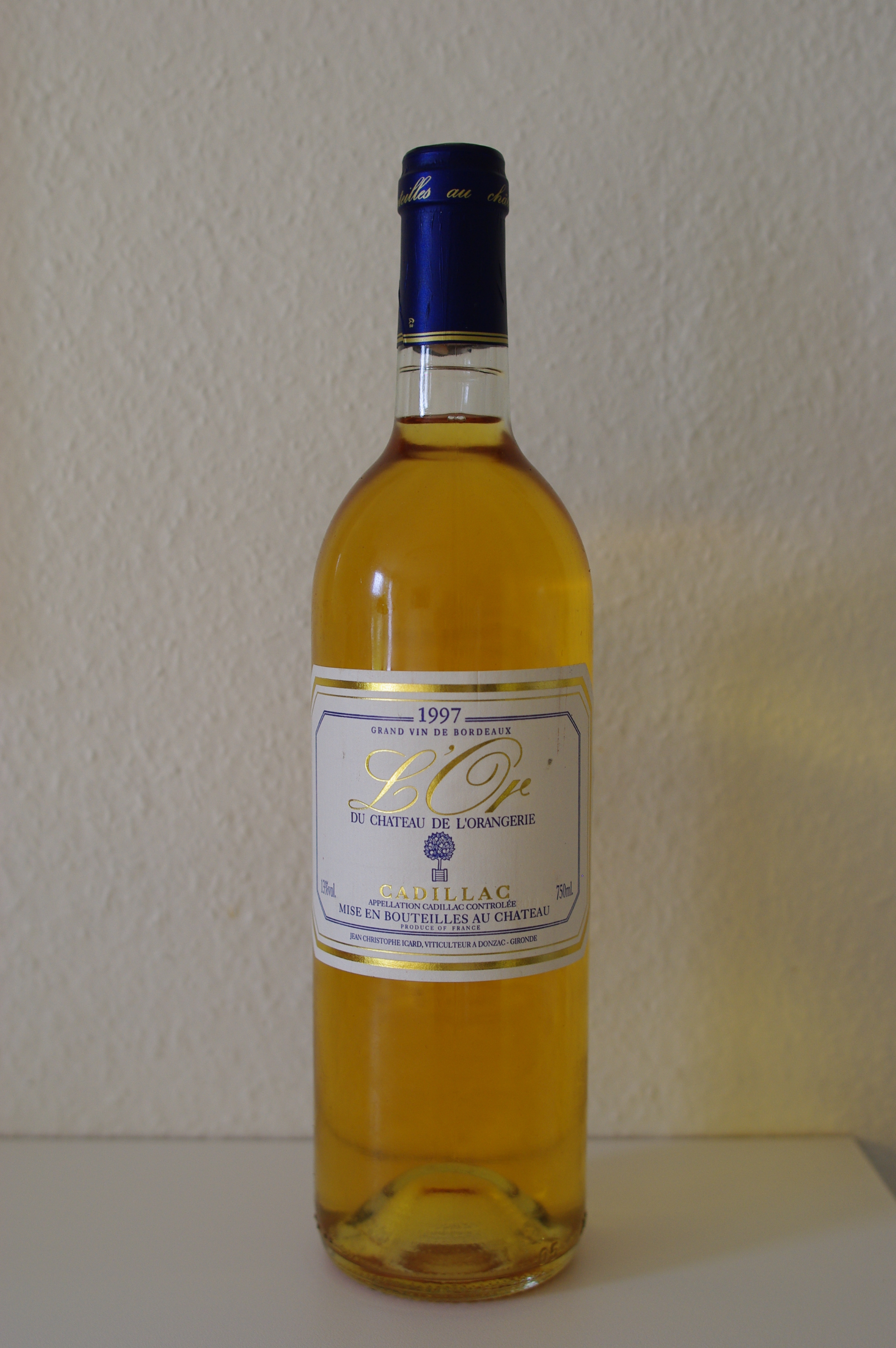
- Type: AOC
- Country: France
- Size of planted vineyards: 128 ha
- Grapes produced: Muscadelle, Sauvignon blanc, Sauvignon gris and Sémillon.

Cadillac (French pronunciation: [kadijak]) is an Appellation d'Origine Contrôlée (AOC) for sweet white wine from the Bordeaux wine region in France. It is located within the Entre-Deux-Mers subregion of Bordeaux. It takes its name from the town of Cadillac-sur-Garonne, formerly known as Cadillac.

In 2008, the area under cultivation was 128 hectares (320 acres), producing 6,000 hectolitres of wine.

== History ==
The history of wine-growing in the Cadillac area parallels that of the wider Bordeaux wine growing region.

Situated within the Premières Côtes de Bordeaux AOC, Cadillac has been a separate AOC since August 10, 1973.

== Location and climate ==
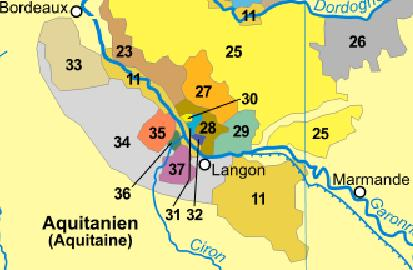
Location of the Cadillac AOC (#30) in relation to other wine districts of Bordeaux including Graves(#34), Pessac-Léognan (#33), Sauternes (#37), Barsac (#36) and Entre-Deux-Mers (#25).

Cadillac-sur-Garonne, formerly known as Cadillac, is a small town tucked between the right bank of the Garonne and the calcareous cliffs of the Entre-Deux-Mers plateau, and is about thirty kilometres from Bordeaux. The appellation area includes the communes of Baurech, Beguey, Cadillac, Capian, Cardan, Donzac, Tabanac, Le Tourne, Verdelais and Villenave-de-Rions.

The Cadillac region enjoys the same moderate oceanic climate as the Mérignac meteorological station.

The proximity of the Garonne, which runs immediately beneath the wine-growing area, creates a local micro-climate. In autumn the river gives rise to early morning humidity, which gradually dries up in the course of the day, conditions that are particularly conducive to the development of moulds that eventually turn into noble rot.

== Grape varieties ==
The appellation area is planted with traditional Bordeaux grape varieties. Sémillon covers 70% of the area. A grape variety with potentially high concentrations of sugar, it has a thin skin which allows the Botrytis cinerea fungus to develop and produce noble rot. The 20% of Sauvignon blanc and Sauvignon gris grapes used add a touch of liveliness to the wine, while the 10% of Muscadelle add a touch of added complexity.

== Viticulture ==
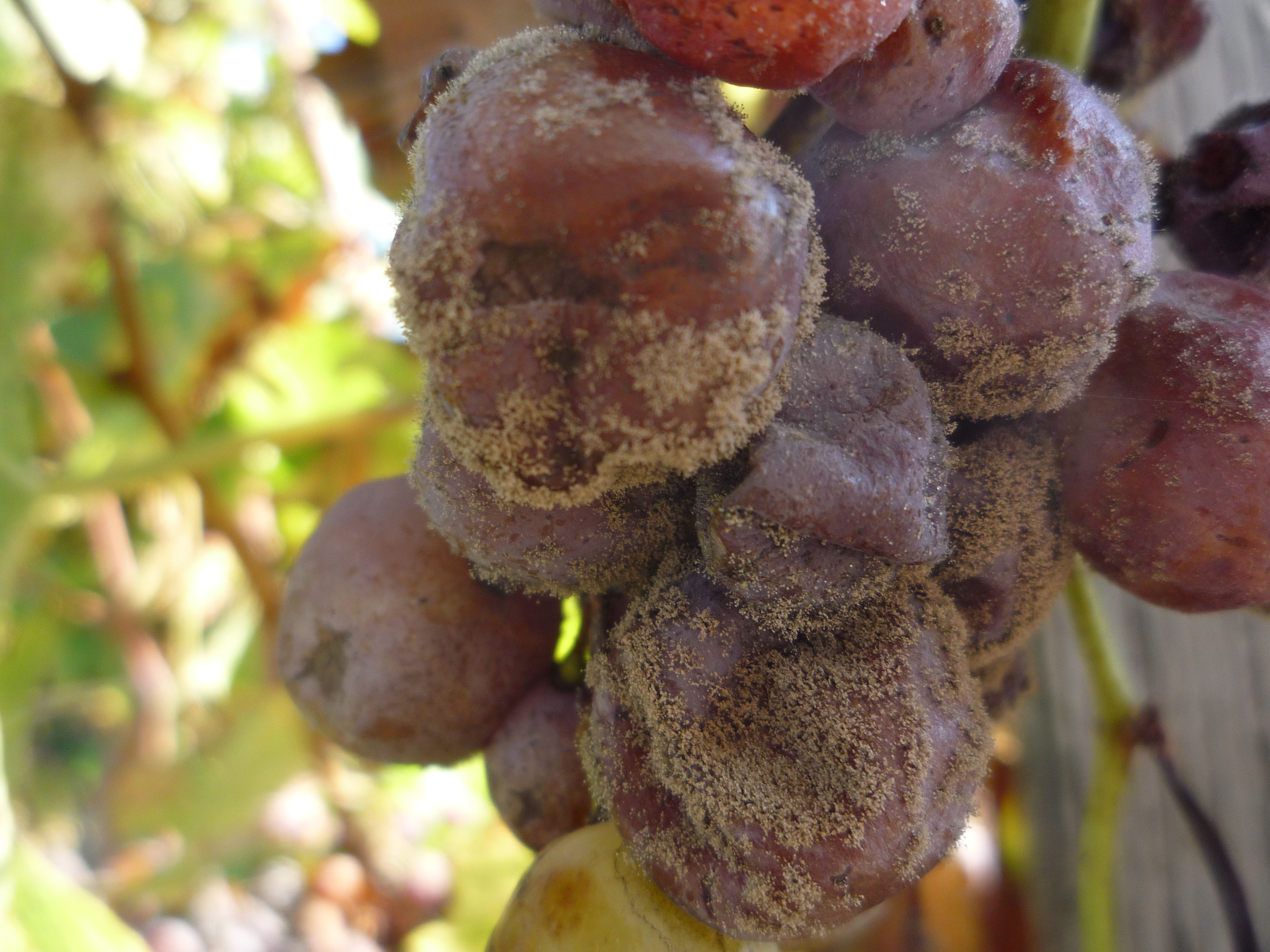
Semillon infected with botrytis.

The density of planting required is at least 4,500 vines per hectare. The distance between rows should be 2.50 metres at most, and the distance between individual vines within the row should be at least 0.85 metres.

Pruning of vines should take place annually, before the first leaves have fully developed. Single and Double Guyot, Cordon de Royat (unilateral cordon), Eventail (Fan) and Gobelet (Goblet) are the permitted pruning methods. The number of buds (that will eventually bear clusters) is limited to a maximum of 12. Once suckering and green harvesting have been completed, the maximum number of clusters allowed per vine is 14.

Plots that have been abandoned can no longer be considered part of the AOC area. Wine-growers must mow or use herbicides to prevent weeds from growing up around the vines, otherwise they could create a humid micro-climate below the leaves that would encourage the development of cryptogamic diseases. They must also carry out treatments to keep the occurrence of diseases such as mildew and oidium below the permitted quality thresholds. The proportion of dead or missing vines may not exceed 20% of the total number. If this percentage is exceeded, the final yield must be cut down proportionately.

=== Harvesting ===
Harvesting is carried out when the grapes are fully ripe. The degree of ripeness is ascertained by the presence of noble rot or signs of over-maturity, i.e. grapes have begun to dry out on the vine and have become shrivelled, golden-coloured berries. It can also be assessed by measuring the sugar content. Before harvesting can begin, it must be shown that the grapes contain at least 255 grams of sugar per litre.

Harvesting is carried out manually over multiple successive pickings, combined with sorting of the grapes. The grape-pickers are ordered to pick only those clusters or part-clusters which are either fully ripe or have heightened sugar content brought about by noble rot. This automatically precludes the use of harvesting machines.

== Winemaking ==
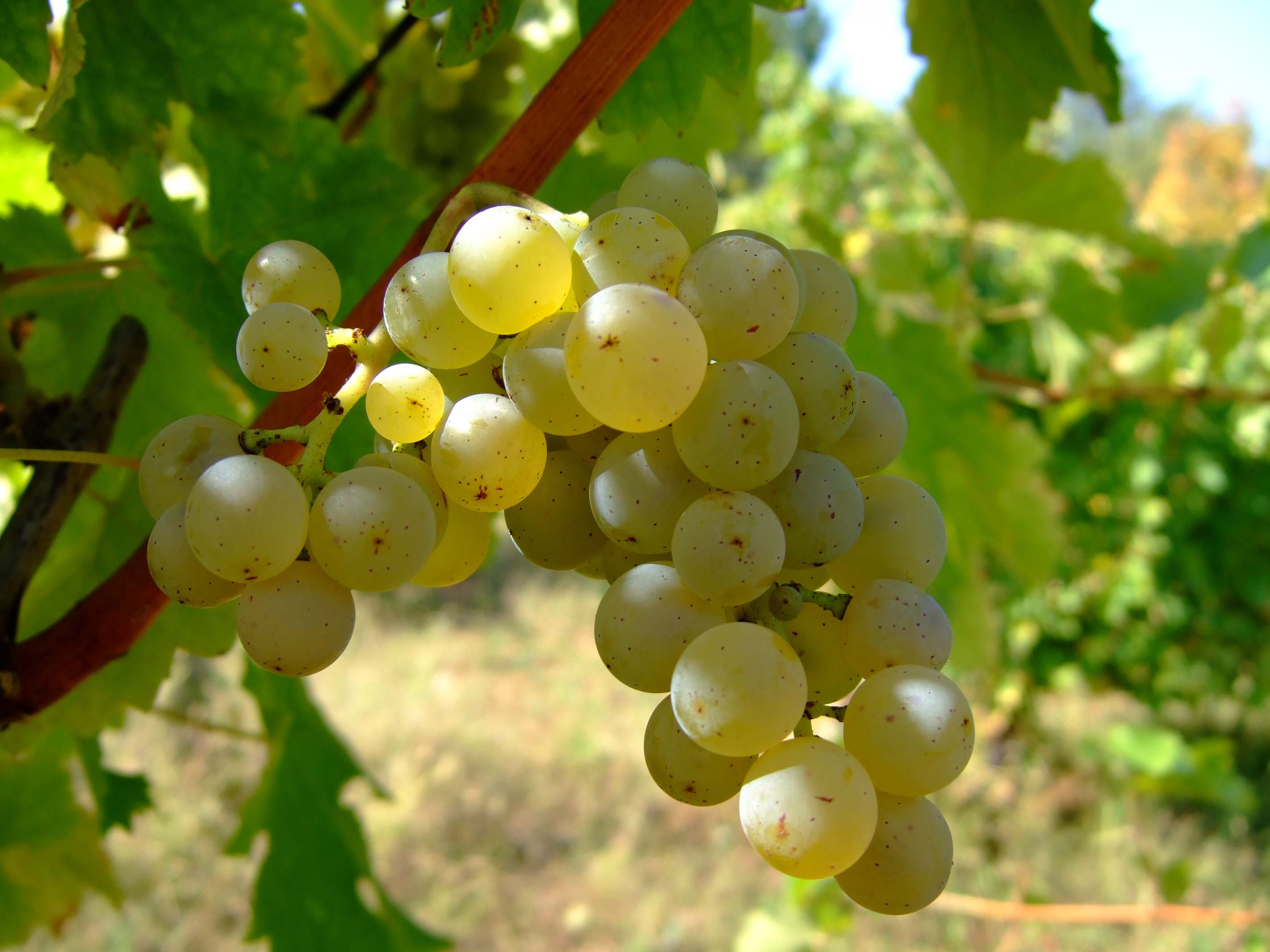
Sauvignon blanc grapes.

Once they arrive in the wine sheds, the grapes are pressed. The process is carried out slowly in order to allow enough time for the must to be extracted from the virtually dried-out fruits. Even so, yields of juice are low. The use of machines which completely break down the grapes is prohibited, i.e. self-emptying tanks with combined rotor crushers and must pumps, continuous screw presses and small diameter screw presses.

The must is placed in tanks and cooled ready for racking. Afterwards, the must is left to ferment, either in vats or in barrels.

The fermentation process is lengthy, since the sugar and alcohol slow down the activity of the yeast. Fermentation either stops naturally or is stopped by the wine-grower using cooling and sterile filtering processes: this kind of filtering uses a very fine mesh to capture the yeasts that have been anesthetized by the cold. At this stage, the wine is stabilized against possible yeast or bacterial contamination by the addition of sulfites.

The wine is left to mature in vats or barrels for several months and is not allowed to leave the wine sheds before 31 March of the year following the harvest. Quarterly rackings ensure that the lees held in suspension in the wine are gradually removed. Before being bottled, the wine is filtered and the sulfite level is adjusted.

== Wine styles and AOC regulations ==
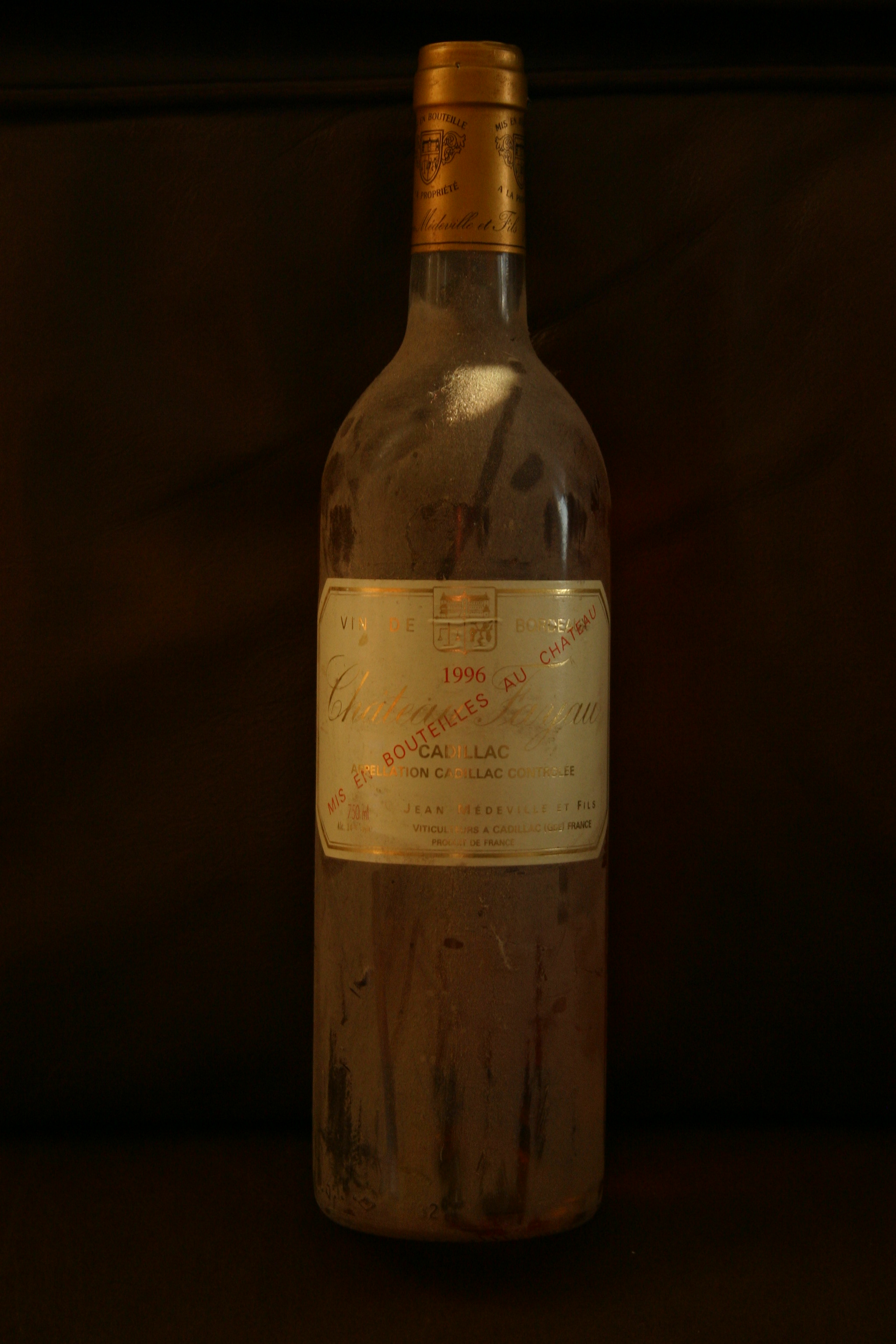
A bottle of Cadillac: Chateau Fayau, 1996

The wine has a golden yellow colour that slowly develops over time to a shade of amber. Aromas are generally fruity (apricot, citrus), floral (honeysuckle, honey, acacia...) and spicy (vanilla). On the palate, sweetness of aroma and sugar content are balanced by the wine's acidity. The wine is suitable for aging.

The wine must have a minimum acquired alcohol content of 12% by volume. The amount of (non-fermented) residual sugar must be at least 51 grams per litre. If the wine has been enriched, the potential alcohol content of the wine may not exceed 19% by volume.
