= Donzac =

Donzac may refer to the following places in France:

- Donzac, Gironde, a commune in the Gironde department
- Donzac, Tarn-et-Garonne, a commune in the Tarn-et-Garonne department
