= Sainte-Croix-du-Mont AOC =

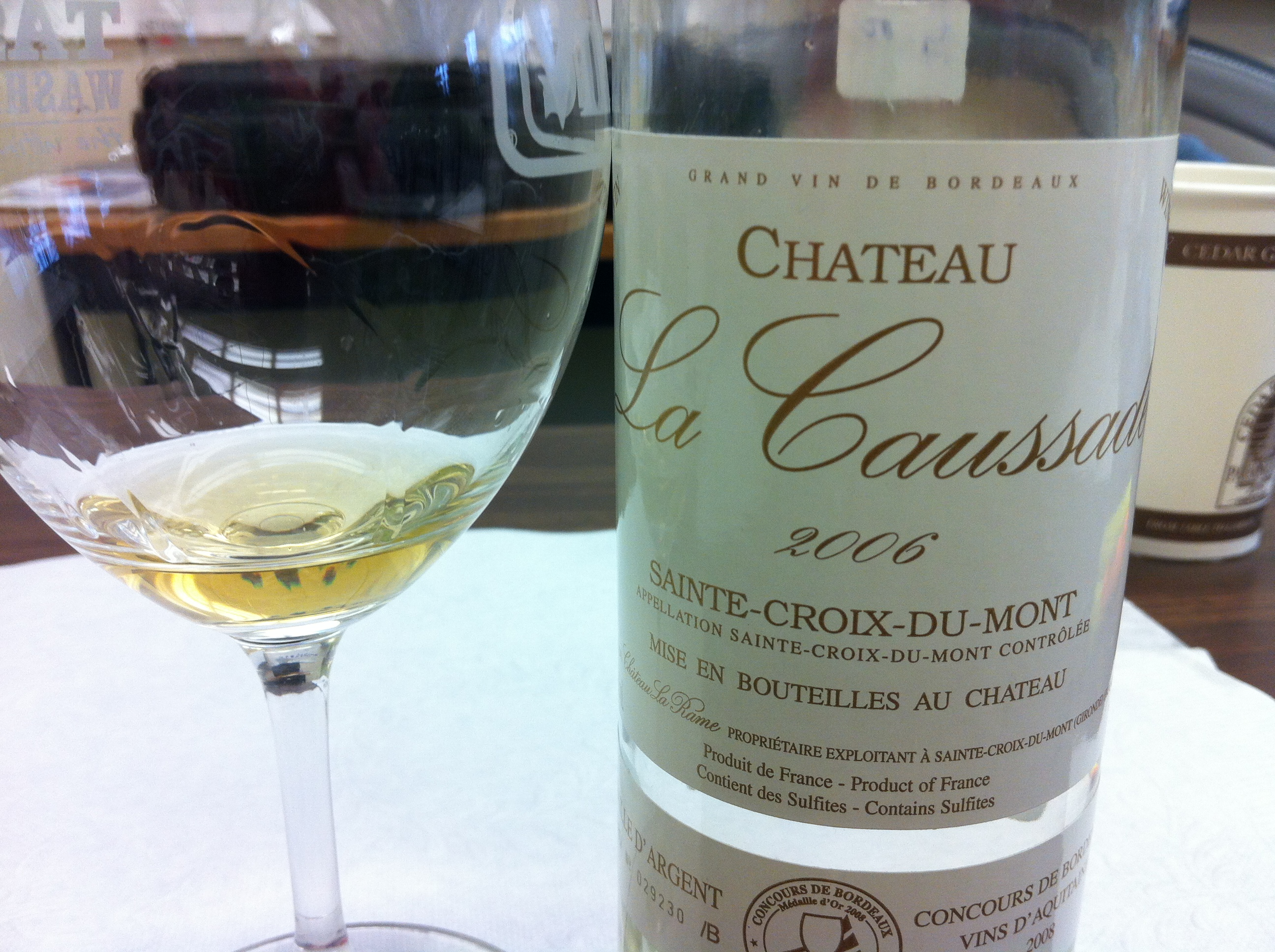
A wine from Sainte-Croix-du-Mont made from grapes infected by Botrytis cinerea.

Sainte-Croix-du-Mont (French pronunciation: [sɛ̃t kʁwa dy mɔ̃]) is an Appellation d'origine contrôlée (AOC) for sweet white wine from the Bordeaux wine region in France.

== Geography ==
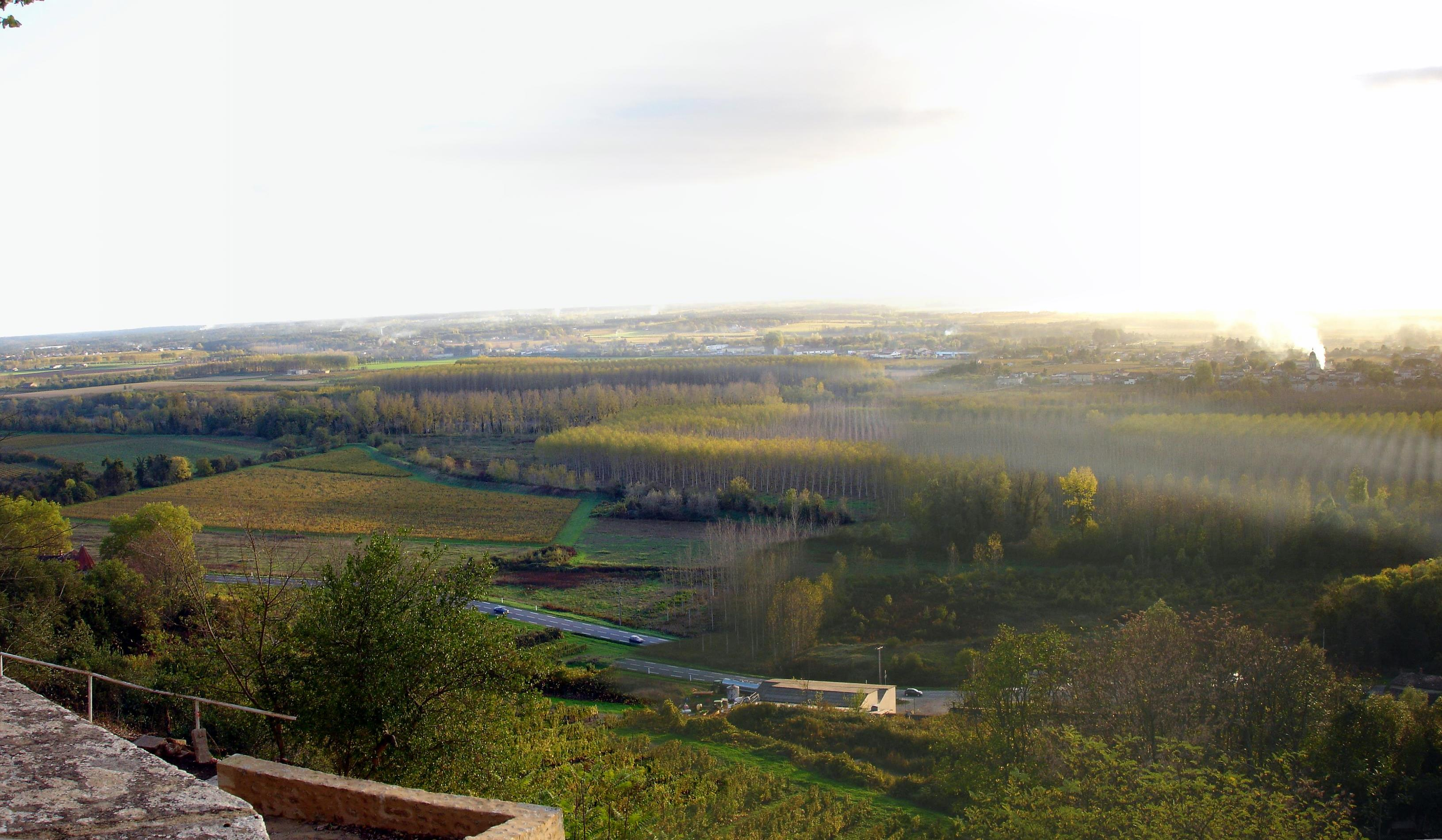
Vineyard seen from church square

The wine-growing area is located in the Aquitaine region of France and surrounds the commune of Sainte-Croix-du-Mont in the Gironde department. It is located on the right bank of the Garonne river, in the Entre-Deux-Mers subregion of Bordeaux.

== Appellation ==
The appellation extends over 500 hectares (1,200 acres) and the grape varieties grown are Sémillon, Sauvignon and Muscadelle. It has a good geographical location for producing wine affected by noble rot as many of the vineyards grow next to rivers and are therefore likely to be affected by the Botrytis cinerea fungus in the autumn. The noble rot increases the sugar content, acidity, and glycerol content of the grape clusters.

The wines from Sainte-Croix-du-Mont are similar in style to the more famous wines from Sauternes on the other side of the Garonne. In similarity to Sauternes, they can be kept for several decades.

The Syndicat Viticole de Sainte-Croix-du-Mont (Wine-growers Union of Sainte-Croix-du-Mont) is responsible for managing the use of the Sainte-Croix-du-Mont AOC and has managed the related internet site since 2007.
