= Louis de Nogaret de La Valette =

His Eminence Louis de Nogaret de La Valette
- Cardinal-Deacon of Sant'Adriano al Foro
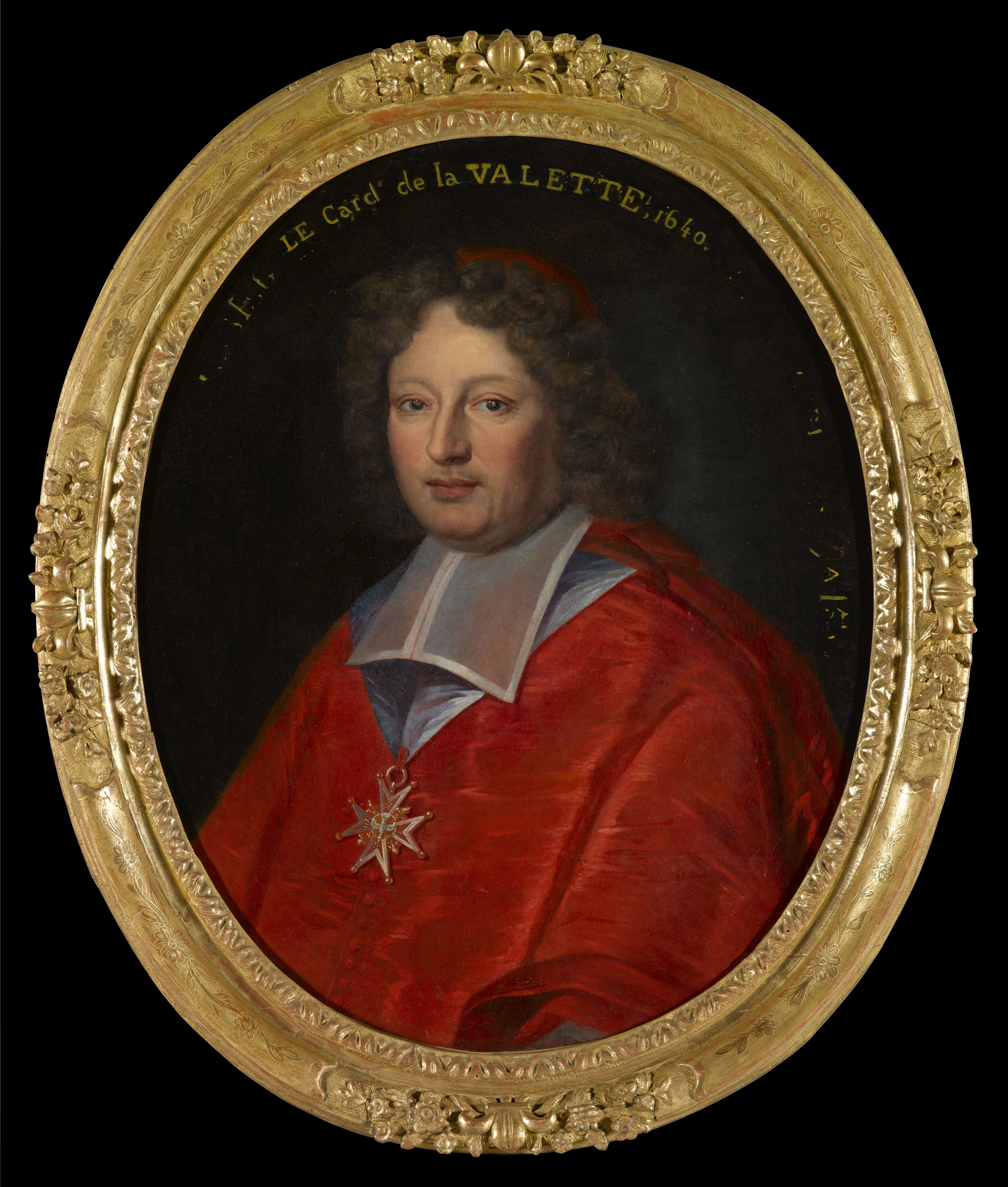
- Church: Roman Catholic
- In office: 1623–1627

Orders
- Created cardinal: 11 January 1621 by Pope Paul V
- Rank: Cardinal-Deacon

Personal details
- Born: 8 February 1593 Angoulême, France
- Died: 27 September 1639 (aged 46) Rivoli

Louis de Nogaret de La Valette (8 February 1593, in Angoulême – 28 September 1639, in Rivoli) was a Roman Catholic cardinal and lieutenant general in the French Army.

== Life ==
Louis was the third son of Jean Louis de Nogaret de La Valette (1554–1642) and Marguerite de Foix-Candale.

As early as age 6, he received the abbey of Grandselve. In 1611, he left this abbey to François de Joyeuse and became Archbishop of Toulouse in his place. He also became Grand Almoner of France of King Louis XIII.

In 1621, Pope Paul V made him cardinal-deacon of Sant'Adriano al Foro.

Louis also was the commander of an army in the Thirty Years' War, commanding a French detachment alongside the army of Bernard of Saxe-Weimar in the summer of 1635. Together, they took Bingen, lifted the Sieges of Zweibrücken and Mainz, and withdrew the army from Mainz back to Lorraine after desertion sapped it of two-thirds of its men.

Cardinal de La Valette served in the war under Cardinal Richelieu, which earned him the nickname of cardinal valet (servant cardinal).
