= Loupiac, Gironde =

Loupiac
- Commune
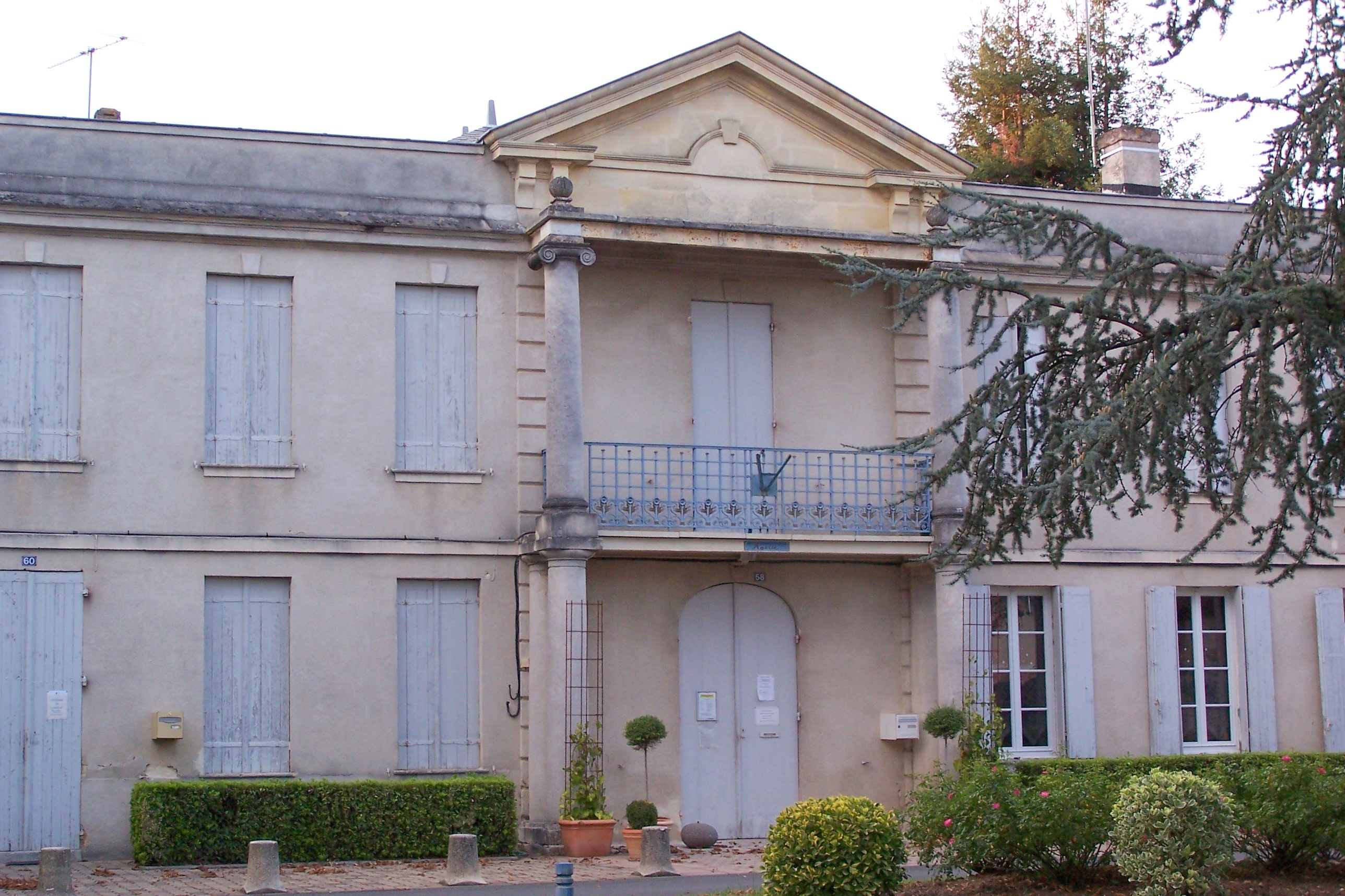
- Town hall
- Location of Loupiac
- Location within France Location within Nouvelle-Aquitaine
- Coordinates: 44°37′30″N 0°17′57″W
- Country: France
- Region: Nouvelle-Aquitaine
- Department: Gironde
- Arrondissement: Langon
- Canton: L'Entre-Deux-Mers

Government
  - Mayor (2023–2026): Patrick Expert
- Area^{1}: 9.57 km^{2} (3.69 sq mi)
- Elevation: 85 m (279 ft)
- Highest elevation: 108 m (354 ft)
- Lowest elevation: 3 m (9.8 ft)
- Population (2023): 1,093
  - Density: 114/km^{2} (296/sq mi)
- Time zone: UTC+01:00 (CET)
  - Summer (DST): UTC+02:00 (CEST)
- INSEE/Postal code: 33253 /33410
- ^{1} French Land Register data, which excludes lakes, ponds, glaciers > 1 km^{2} (0.386 sq mi or 247 acres) and river estuaries.

Loupiac (French pronunciation: [lupjak]; Occitan: Lopiac) is a commune in the Gironde department in Nouvelle-Aquitaine in southwestern France.

== Population ==
Historical population
Year	Pop.	±% p.a.
1968	890	—
1975	966	+1.18%
1982	981	+0.22%
1990	990	+0.11%
1999	939	−0.59%
2007	968	+0.38%
2012	1,151	+3.52%
2017	1,112	−0.69%
2023	1,093	−0.29%
Source: INSEE

== See also ==
- Communes of the Gironde department
