= Cadillac-sur-Garonne =

- Commune
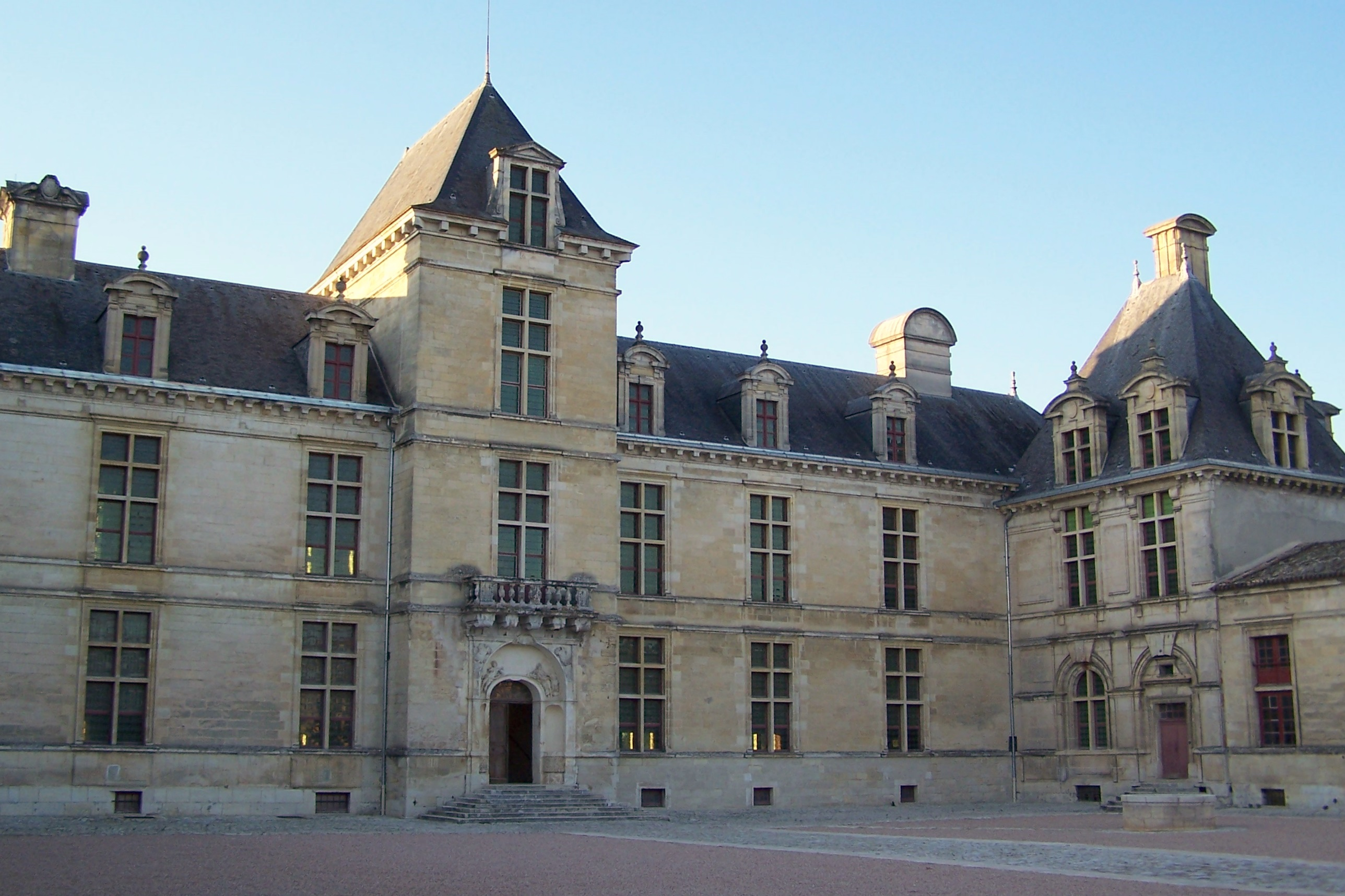
- Château des ducs d'Épernon à Cadillac-sur-Garonne

- Coat of arms
- Location of Cadillac-sur-Garonne
- Location within France Location within Nouvelle-Aquitaine
- Coordinates: 44°38′14″N 0°19′03″W
- Country: France
- Region: Nouvelle-Aquitaine
- Department: Gironde
- Arrondissement: Langon
- Canton: L'Entre-Deux-Mers

Government
  - Mayor (2020–2026): Jocelyn Doré
- Area^{1}: 5.44 km^{2} (2.10 sq mi)
- Elevation: 18 m (59 ft)
- Highest elevation: 92 m (302 ft)
- Lowest elevation: 3 m (9.8 ft)
- Population (2023): 2,670
  - Density: 491/km^{2} (1,270/sq mi)
- Time zone: UTC+01:00 (CET)
  - Summer (DST): UTC+02:00 (CEST)
- INSEE/Postal code: 33081 /33410
- ^{1} French Land Register data, which excludes lakes, ponds, glaciers > 1 km^{2} (0.386 sq mi or 247 acres) and river estuaries.

Cadillac-sur-Garonne (French pronunciation: [kadijak syʁ ɡaʁɔn], literally Cadillac on Garonne; Gascon: Cadilhac, known as Cadillac until 31 December 2022) is a commune in the Gironde department in Nouvelle-Aquitaine in southwestern France.

The town is best known for being the namesake for the title adopted by Antoine Laumet de La Mothe, sieur de Cadillac, the founder of Detroit and Governor of Louisiana, on his arrival to what is now the United States. The Cadillac division of General Motors, and Cadillac, Michigan are named after him.

== History ==
Cadillac-sur-Garonne was founded in 1280 to serve as a river port for the castle of Benauges by the lord of the castle, Jean-Louis de Nogaret de La Valette (1554–1642), made first Duke of Épernon. He was the archetype of a proud, haughty, and quarrelsome Gascon.

This castle embodies the omnipotence of this cadet of Gascony, who became one of the mignons of King Henry III of France, known as the "Half-King," and amassed honors and riches before dying in disgrace at the age of 88 during the reign of Louis XIII, to whom he provided guards to found the first company of the King's Musketeers in 1622.

At his request, a short-lived tapestry workshop was created there, run by the weaver Claude de La Pierre, who produced, among other things, the tapestry "The History of King Henry the Third" (1632–1637), an item of which was part of the collection of Jacqueline Soulard, an art bookseller and later an antique dealer in a château in Haut-Var, whose furnishings were sold at public auction in Cannes on April 23, 2025.

The Duke's study was familiarly called "The Mustard" by his servants, so fearful were his mood swings.

To build it, part of the fortified city was razed. It bears witness to the end of Renaissance Architecture and already heralds the Classicism of the 17th century. Originally, the château, flanked by two monumental wings and four corner pavilions, surrounded the main courtyard enclosed by a perimeter wall. The wings, pavilions, and this perimeter wall were dismantled in the mid-18th century and their stones sold.

Seized during the French Revolution, it served as a prison in the 19th century, which saw the construction of the two current wings and a concierge's lodge; then as a school for the preservation of young women from 1880. It was badly damaged following a fire (1928), became a Public institution for supervised education which finally closed in 1952. The prison administration then returned the castle to the Secretariat of Fine Arts, then to the Ministry of Culture.

== Name ==
Cadillac-sur-Garonne is attested in the form Cadilacum in 1306. Toponymist Ernest Nègre explains the name as made up of personal Roman name -Catilius, with the suffix -acum.

The suffix -acum is of Gauloise origins (in the form -acon). It served to localise persons or the origins of persons before it became to demark the property of some person.

== Geography ==
Cadillac-sur-Garonne is directly across the Garonne river from Sauternes, and is known for producing sweet dessert wines under the Cadillac AOC designation.

== Population ==
Historical population
Year	Pop.	±% p.a.
1968	3,748	—
1975	3,340	−1.63%
1982	2,961	−1.71%
1990	2,582	−1.70%
1999	2,365	−0.97%
2007	2,435	+0.37%
2012	2,713	+2.19%
2017	2,789	+0.55%
2023	2,670	−0.72%
Source: INSEE

== Sights ==
Cadillac-sur-Garonne is the home of the imposing Château des Ducs d'Épernon.

== See also ==
- French wine
- Communes of the Gironde department
