= Verdelais =

- Commune
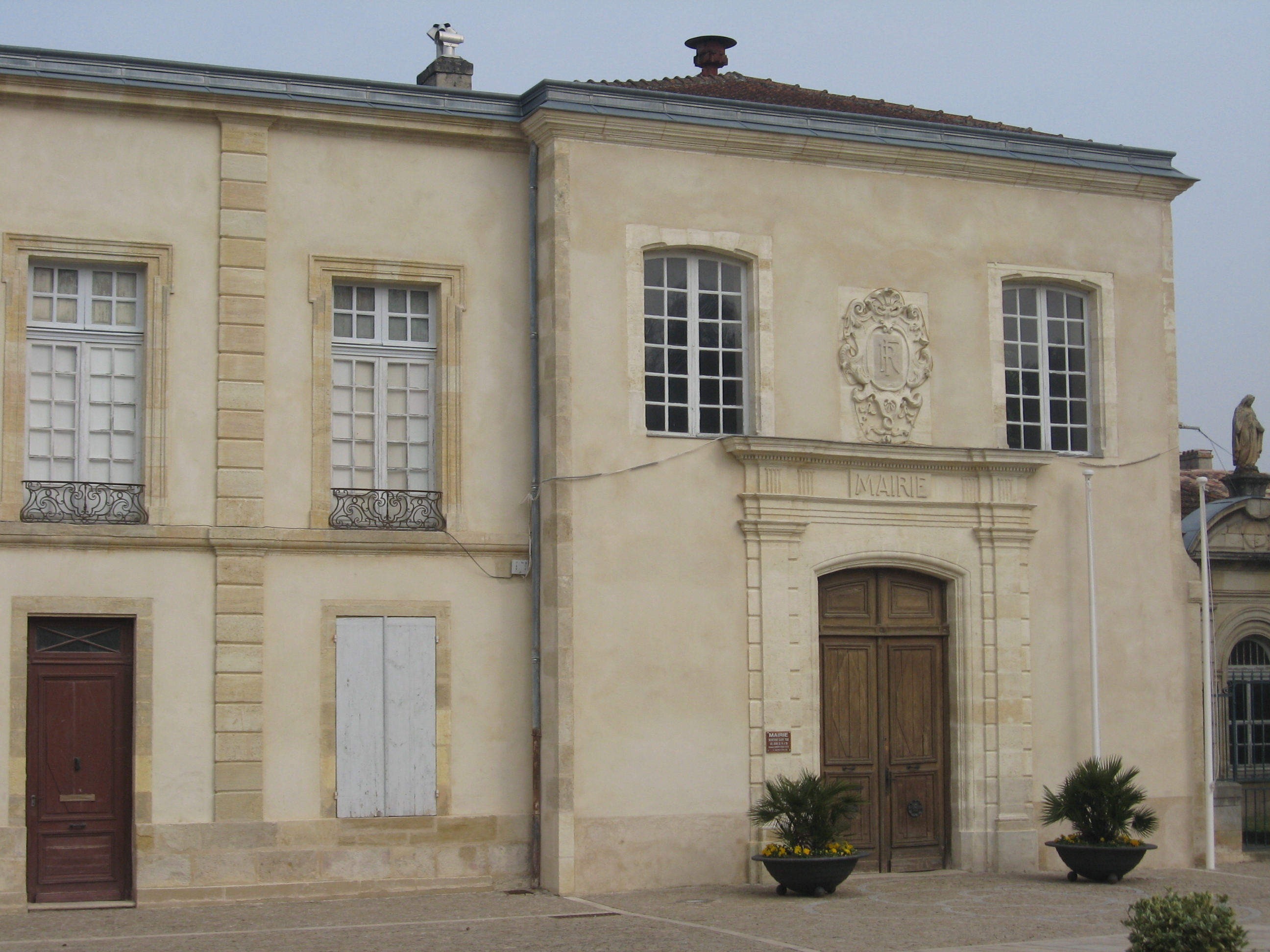
- Town hall
- Location of Verdelais
- Location within France Location within Nouvelle-Aquitaine
- Coordinates: 44°35′19″N 0°15′02″W
- Country: France
- Region: Nouvelle-Aquitaine
- Department: Gironde
- Arrondissement: Langon
- Canton: L'Entre-Deux-Mers
- Intercommunality: Sud Gironde

Government
  - Mayor (2020–2026): Corinne Ribauville
- Area^{1}: 4.75 km^{2} (1.83 sq mi)
- Elevation: 70 m (230 ft)
- Highest elevation: 103 m (338 ft)
- Lowest elevation: 2 m (6.6 ft)
- Population (2023): 1,045
  - Density: 220/km^{2} (570/sq mi)
- Time zone: UTC+01:00 (CET)
  - Summer (DST): UTC+02:00 (CEST)
- INSEE/Postal code: 33543 /33490
- ^{1} French Land Register data, which excludes lakes, ponds, glaciers > 1 km^{2} (0.386 sq mi or 247 acres) and river estuaries.

Verdelais (French pronunciation: [vɛʁdəlɛ]) is a commune in the Gironde department in Nouvelle-Aquitaine in southwestern France.

== Population ==
Historical population
Year	Pop.	±% p.a.
1968	831	—
1975	923	+1.51%
1982	880	−0.68%
1990	869	−0.16%
1999	869	+0.00%
2007	862	−0.10%
2012	961	+2.20%
2017	1,031	+1.42%
2023	1,045	+0.23%
Source: INSEE

== See also ==
- Communes of the Gironde department
