= Lavalette, Haute-Garonne =

Lavalette
- Commune
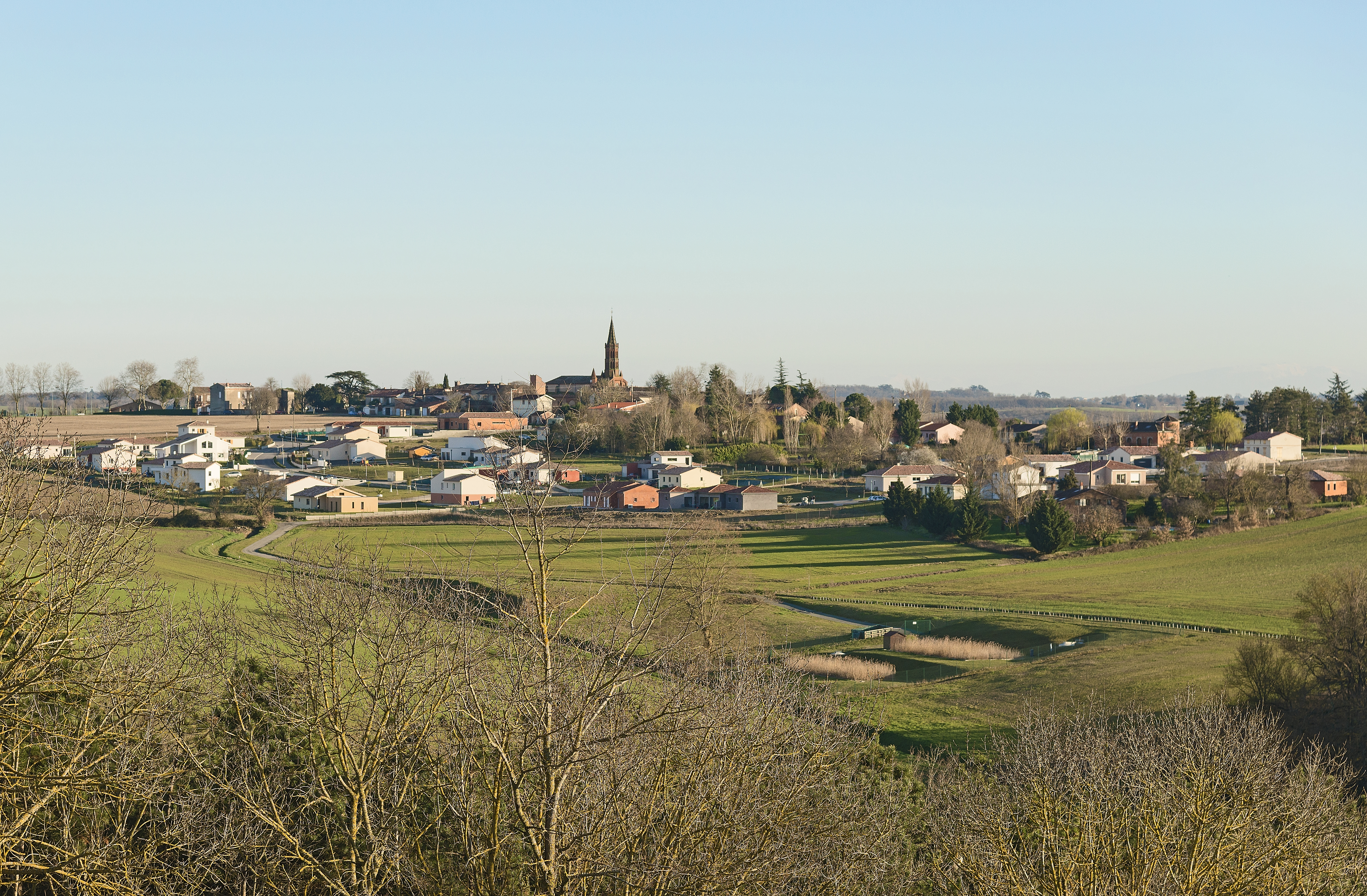
- A general view of Lavalette

- Coat of arms
- Location of Lavalette
- Location within France Location within Occitanie
- Coordinates: 43°38′19″N 1°35′48″E
- Country: France
- Region: Occitania
- Department: Haute-Garonne
- Arrondissement: Toulouse
- Canton: Pechbonnieu

Government
  - Mayor (2020–2026): André Fontés
- Area^{1}: 13.75 km^{2} (5.31 sq mi)
- Elevation: 221 m (725 ft)
- Highest elevation: 233 m (764 ft)
- Lowest elevation: 155 m (509 ft)
- Population (2023): 793
  - Density: 57.7/km^{2} (149/sq mi)
- Time zone: UTC+01:00 (CET)
  - Summer (DST): UTC+02:00 (CEST)
- INSEE/Postal code: 31285 /31590
- ^{1} French Land Register data, which excludes lakes, ponds, glaciers > 1 km^{2} (0.386 sq mi or 247 acres) and river estuaries.

Lavalette (French pronunciation: [lavalɛt]; Occitan: La Valeta) is a commune in the Haute-Garonne department in southwestern France.

== Population ==
Historical population
Year	Pop.	±% p.a.
1968	355	—
1975	406	+1.94%
1982	503	+3.11%
1990	531	+0.68%
1999	602	+1.40%
2007	621	+0.39%
2012	665	+1.38%
2017	738	+2.10%
2023	793	+1.21%
Source: INSEE

The inhabitants of the commune are known as Lavalettois in French.

== Monument ==
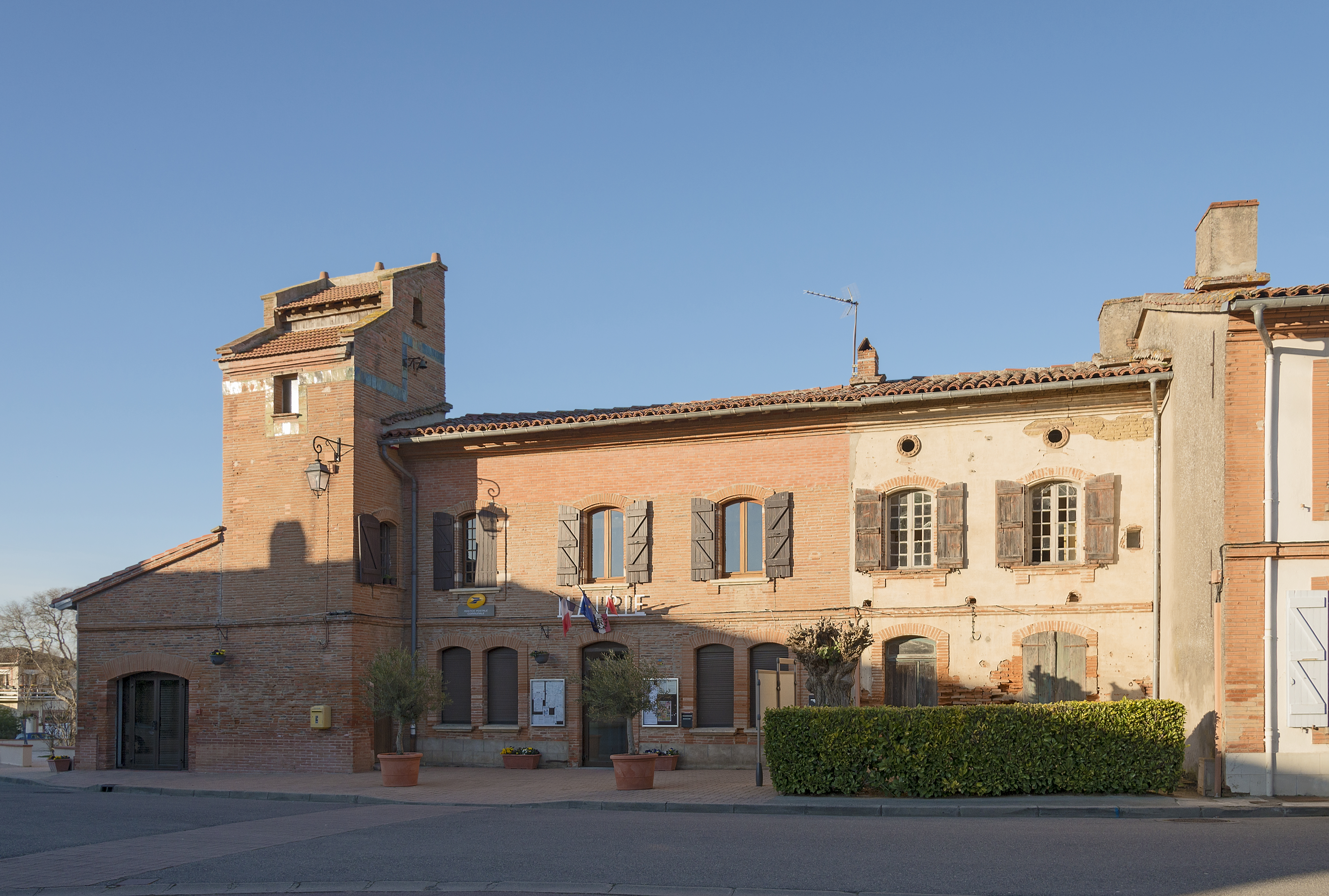
Town hall

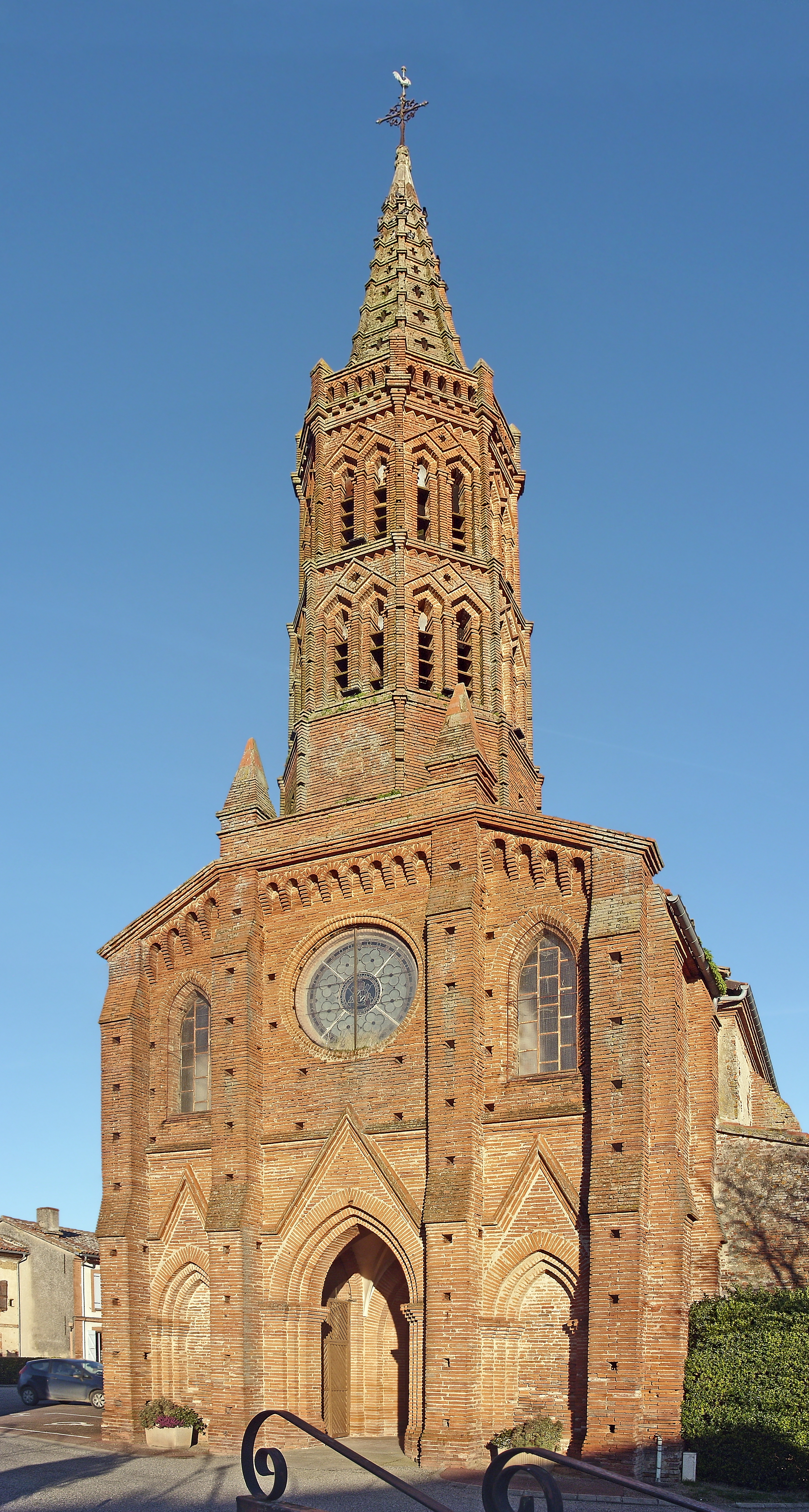
Church Saint-Laurent

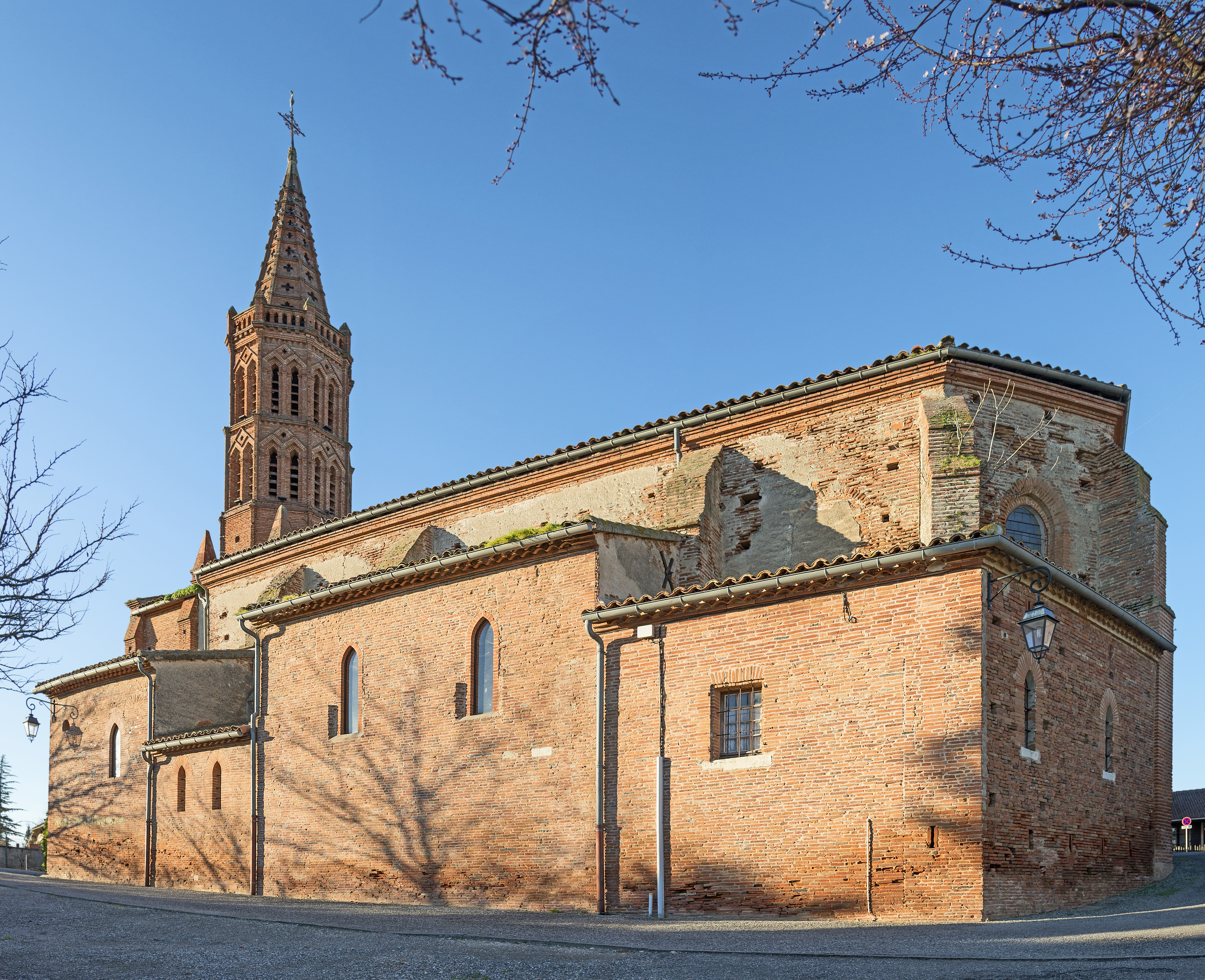
Church Saint-Laurent

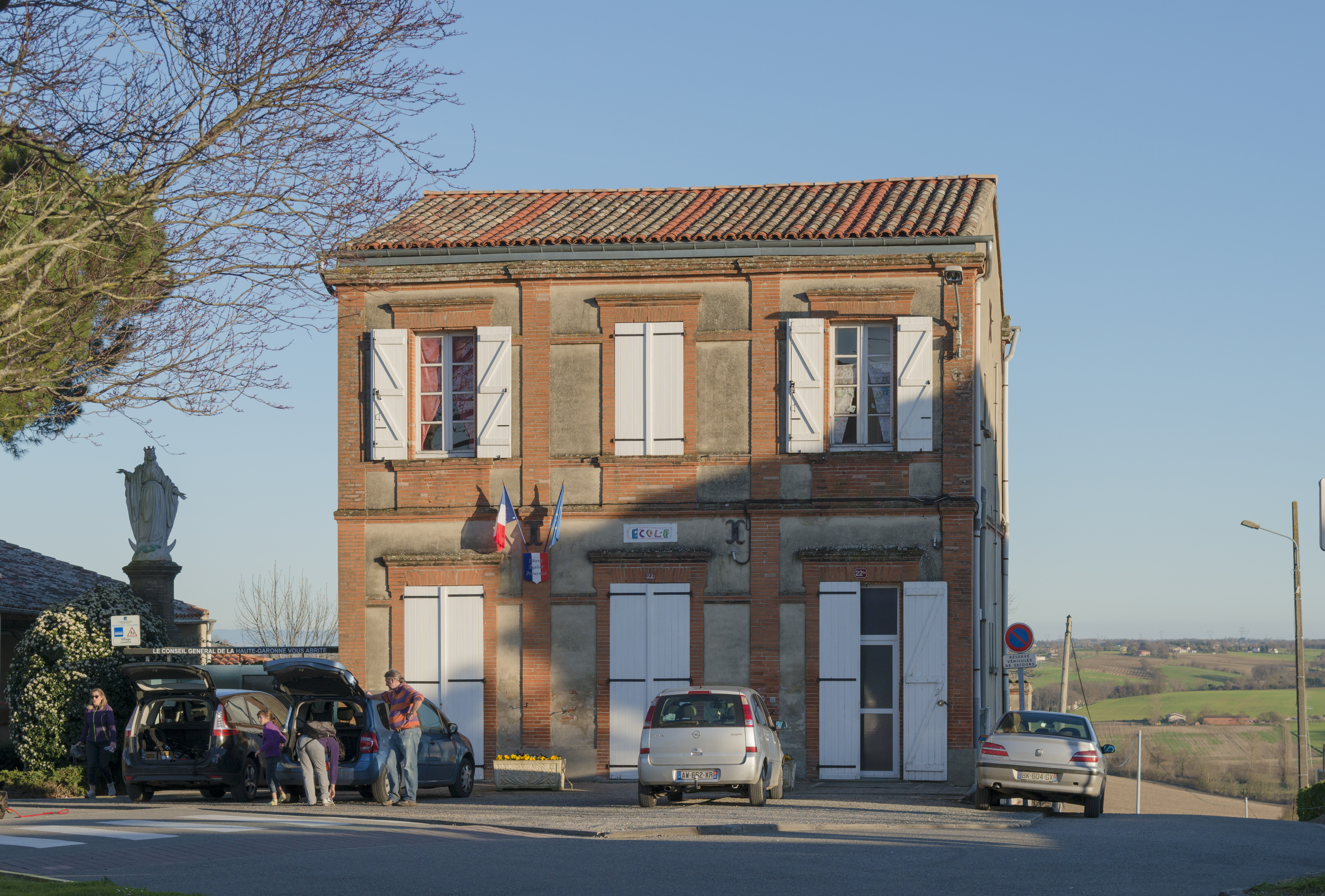
School

== See also ==
Communes of the Haute-Garonne department
