= Donzac, Gironde =

Donzac
- Commune
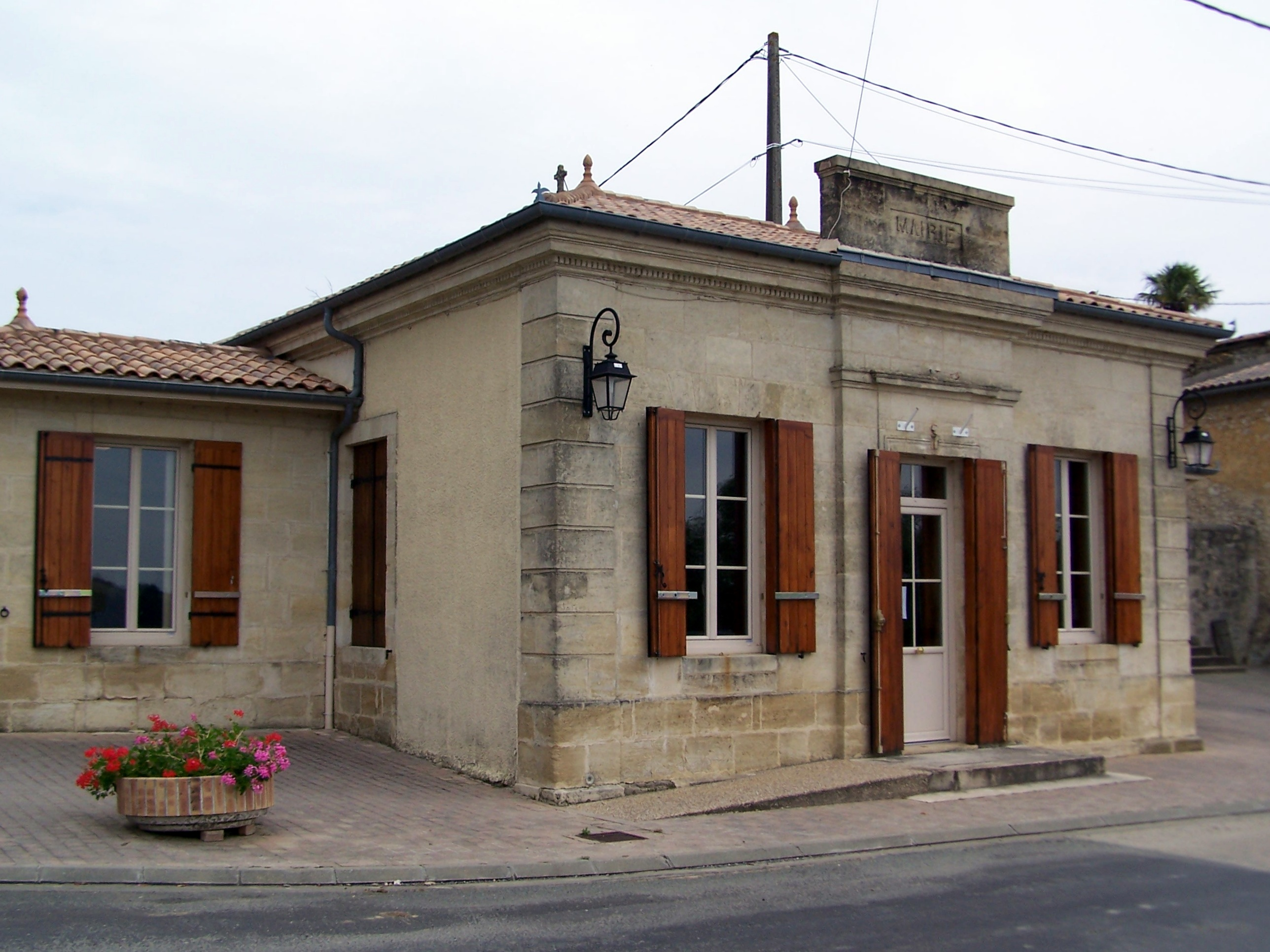
- Town hall
- Location of Donzac
- Location within France Location within Nouvelle-Aquitaine
- Coordinates: 44°39′11″N 0°16′02″W
- Country: France
- Region: Nouvelle-Aquitaine
- Department: Gironde
- Arrondissement: Langon
- Canton: L'Entre-Deux-Mers

Government
  - Mayor (2020–2026): Alain Queyrens
- Area^{1}: 4.41 km^{2} (1.70 sq mi)
- Elevation: 125 m (410 ft)
- Highest elevation: 121 m (397 ft)
- Lowest elevation: 35 m (115 ft)
- Population (2023): 122
  - Density: 27.7/km^{2} (71.7/sq mi)
- Time zone: UTC+01:00 (CET)
  - Summer (DST): UTC+02:00 (CEST)
- INSEE/Postal code: 33152 /33410
- ^{1} French Land Register data, which excludes lakes, ponds, glaciers > 1 km^{2} (0.386 sq mi or 247 acres) and river estuaries.

Donzac (French pronunciation: [dɔ̃zak]) is a commune in the Gironde department in southwestern France.

== Population ==
Historical population
Year	Pop.	±% p.a.
1968	152	—
1975	144	−0.77%
1982	143	−0.10%
1990	124	−1.77%
1999	124	+0.00%
2007	114	−1.05%
2012	156	+6.47%
2017	118	−5.43%
2023	122	+0.56%
Source: INSEE

== See also ==
- Communes of the Gironde department
