= Brouqueyran =

- Commune
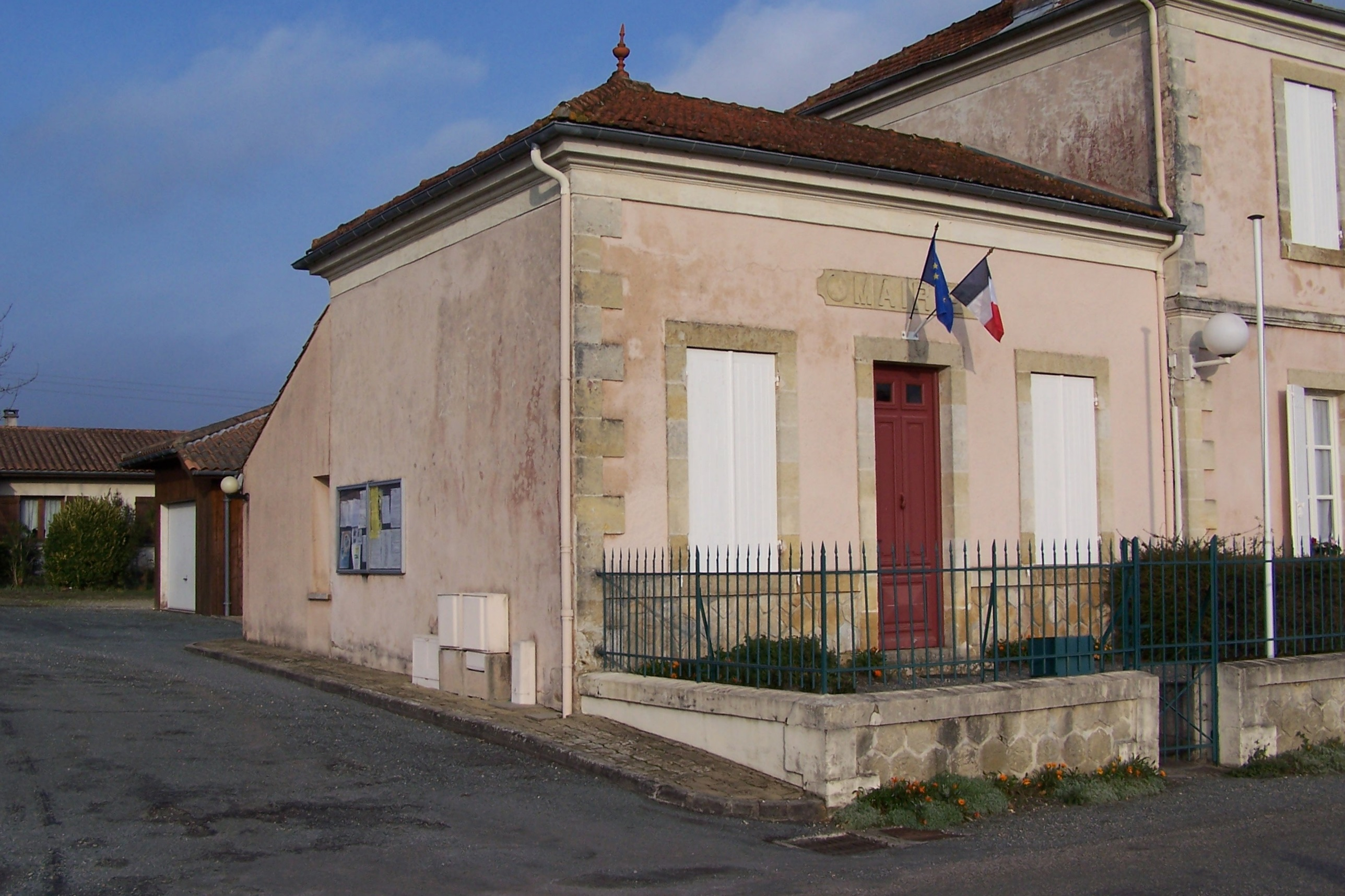
- Town hall

- Coat of arms
- Location of Brouqueyran
- Location within France Location within Nouvelle-Aquitaine
- Coordinates: 44°29′05″N 0°10′26″W
- Country: France
- Region: Nouvelle-Aquitaine
- Department: Gironde
- Arrondissement: Langon
- Canton: Le Réolais et Les Bastides

Government
  - Mayor (2020–2026): Jean-Louis Saumon
- Area^{1}: 5.66 km^{2} (2.19 sq mi)
- Elevation: 105 m (344 ft)
- Highest elevation: 114 m (374 ft)
- Lowest elevation: 30 m (98 ft)
- Population (2023): 196
  - Density: 34.6/km^{2} (89.7/sq mi)
- Time zone: UTC+01:00 (CET)
  - Summer (DST): UTC+02:00 (CEST)
- INSEE/Postal code: 33074 /33124
- ^{1} French Land Register data, which excludes lakes, ponds, glaciers > 1 km^{2} (0.386 sq mi or 247 acres) and river estuaries.

Brouqueyran (French pronunciation: [bʁukejʁɑ̃]; Occitan: Broqueiran) is a commune in the Gironde department in Nouvelle-Aquitaine in southwestern France.

== Geography ==
=== Location ===
The commune of Brouqueyran is located in the Haute-Lande-Girondine, on the Beuve, 56 km southeast of Bordeaux, the capital of the department, 12 km southeast of Langon the capital of the district and 3.5 km southwest of Auros, the former capital of the canton.

=== Neighboring communes ===
The neighbouring communes are Auros to the north-northeast, Berthez to the east, Lados to the southeast, Bazas to the south, Cazats to the southwest and Coimères to the west-northwest.

== Urban planning ==
=== Typology ===
As of 1 January 2024, Brouqueyran is categorized as a rural commune with very dispersed housing, according to the new seven-level municipal density grid defined by INSEE in 2022. It is located outside urban units and outside the influence of cities.

=== Land use ===
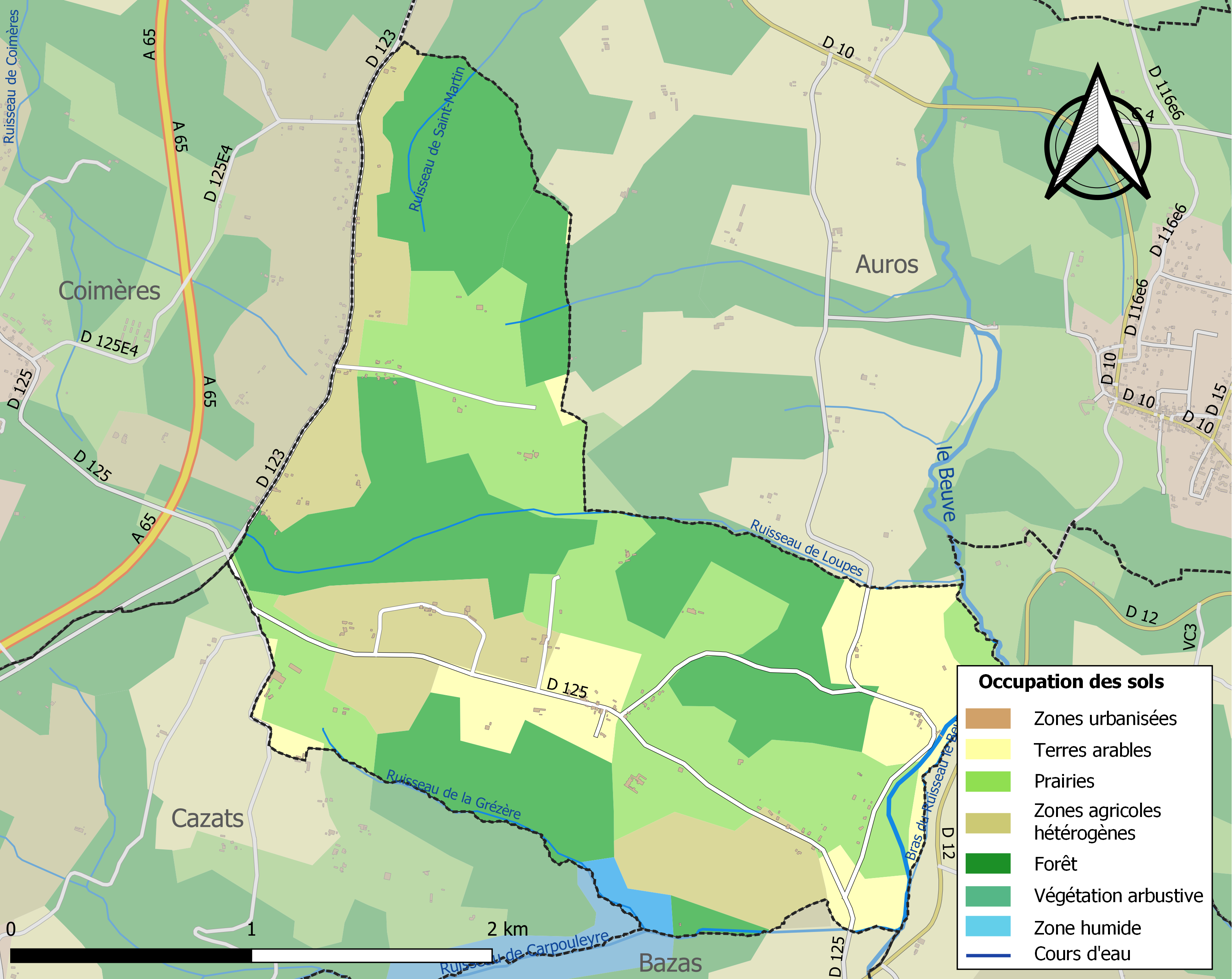
Map of infrastructure and land use in the commune in 2018 (CLC).

Land cover in the municipality, as shown in the European biophysical land cover database Corine Land Cover (CLC), is characterized by the significant presence of agricultural land (61.1% in 2018), a decrease compared to 1990 (62.7%). The detailed breakdown in 2018 is as follows: forests (38%), grasslands (29.2%), heterogeneous agricultural areas (18.5%), arable land (8.9%), permanent crops (4.4%), inland waters (0.9%). The evolution of land cover in the municipality and its infrastructure can be observed on various cartographic representations of the territory: the Cassini map (18th century), the General Staff map (1820-1866), and IGN maps or aerial photographs for the current period (1950 to the present).

=== Major risks ===
The territory of the commune of Brouqueyran is vulnerable to various natural hazards: weather-related events (storms, thunderstorms, snow, extreme cold, heat waves, or droughts), floods, and earthquakes (very low seismicity). A website published by the BRGM (French Geological Survey) allows for a simple and quick assessment of the risks to a property located either by its address or by its plot number.

The commune has been recognized as being in a state of natural disaster due to the damage caused by floods and mudslides that occurred in 1982, 1999, 2009, and 2020.

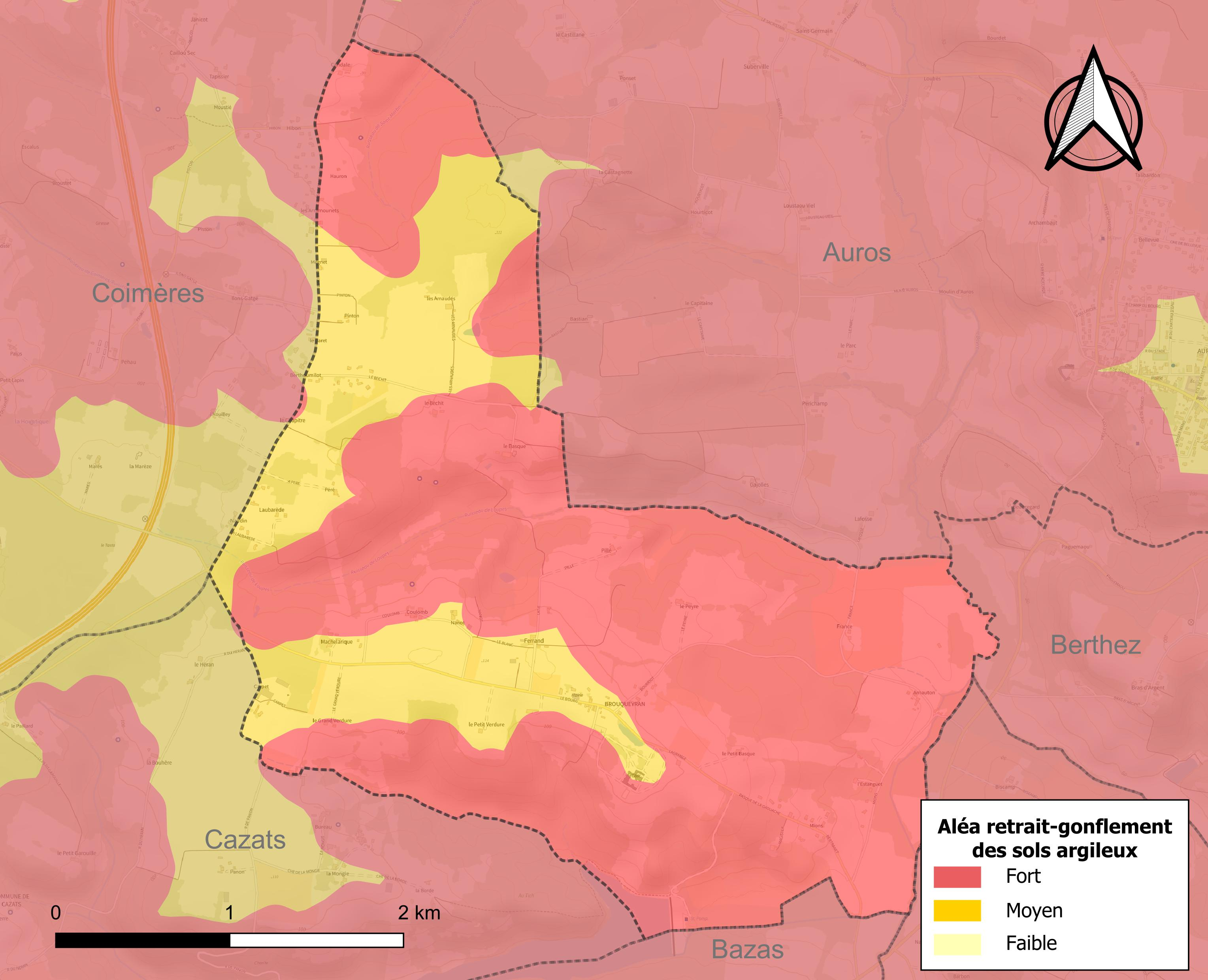
Map of the shrink-swell hazard zones of clay soils in Brouqueyran.

The shrinkage and swelling of clay soils can cause significant damage to buildings in the event of alternating periods of drought and rain. The commune is at medium or high risk (67.4% at the departmental level and 48.5% at the national level). Of the 86 buildings surveyed in the commune in 2019, all 100% are at medium or high risk, compared to 84% at the departmental level and 54% at the national level. A map of the national territory's exposure to clay soil shrinkage and swelling is available on the BRGM website.

Furthermore, to better understand the risk of ground subsidence, the national inventory of underground cavities allows for the identification of those located within the commune.

Regarding landslides, the commune was recognized as being in a state of natural disaster due to damage caused by drought in 2011, 2015 and 2017 and by landslides in 1999.

== Etymology ==
For Dauzat, Brouqueyran comes from a Gallo-Roman name of man, *Broccarius, from the Welsh broccos, "taish", with the suffix -anum. Jacques Astor, quoted by Bénédicte Boyrie-Fénié, also thinks that the name comes from *Broccarius, with another meaning (the Welsh broccos also has the meaning or connotation of "prominent").

Bénédicte Boyrie-Fénié, part of testimonies that are once by Brouqueyran, once by Beucoiran, in Moulis-en-Médoc: Becoiran (Petrus de ~), in 1242-1255 (Beucoiran), Brouqueyran (ecclesiam de ~), in 1261 (Broqueiran), Bolcayran, dates (Beucoiran), Belcorano, undated (Beucoiran), Bolqueran / Bolqueyran, undated (Beucoiran). The sense of broc (cf. Welsh broccos, "taish" and Latin brochus, "the one with the prominent teeth or the prominent mouth, that exceed" and the one of beak, word only medoquin, is first "thorn" and the derivatives of the first designate bartàs, places full of white broc or white broc. By adding the collective suffix (set of...) Latin -ariu(m) and the locative suffix (the place where there is...) -anu(m), Brouqueyran, like Beucoiran and also like Espiet (< Espinet-), were, according to B. Boyrie-Fénié, places full of bushes, when they arrived.

== History ==
In 1763, Abbot Expilly described the village as follows:

"Brouqueyran, in the Condomois region of Gascony, Diocese and Election of Condom, Parliament and Intendancy of Bordeaux, Jurisdiction of the Provostship of Condom. It has 56 households. This parish is situated in a fairly fertile area, primarily for grain.” It is not certain that Abbot Jean-Joseph Expilly always verified his statements, if indeed the aforementioned mention refers to this Brouqueyran. The geographical location suggests this, as the Diocese of Condom notably begins beyond Bouglon, and Brouqueyran is actually in the Diocese of Bazas, more precisely in the archpriestship of Cuilleron.

During the French Revolution, the parish of Saint-Pierre de Brouqueyran became the commune of Brouqueyran.

== Population ==
Historical population
Year	Pop.	±% p.a.
1968	140	—
1975	144	+0.40%
1982	122	−2.34%
1990	136	+1.37%
1999	148	+0.94%
2007	191	+3.24%
2012	214	+2.30%
2017	194	−1.94%
2023	196	+0.17%
Source: INSEE

== Culture ==
=== Places and monuments ===
The Château de Mirail is privately owned and not open to the public. Its southwest tower houses a chapel with remarkable facades, roofs, and decoration, as well as a fireplace adorned with a sculpted relief depicting the Denial of Saint Peter. The entire complex was listed as a monument historique by decree in 1990.

- The Church of Saint-Pierre-ès-Liens, in the town center, dates from the 12th century.
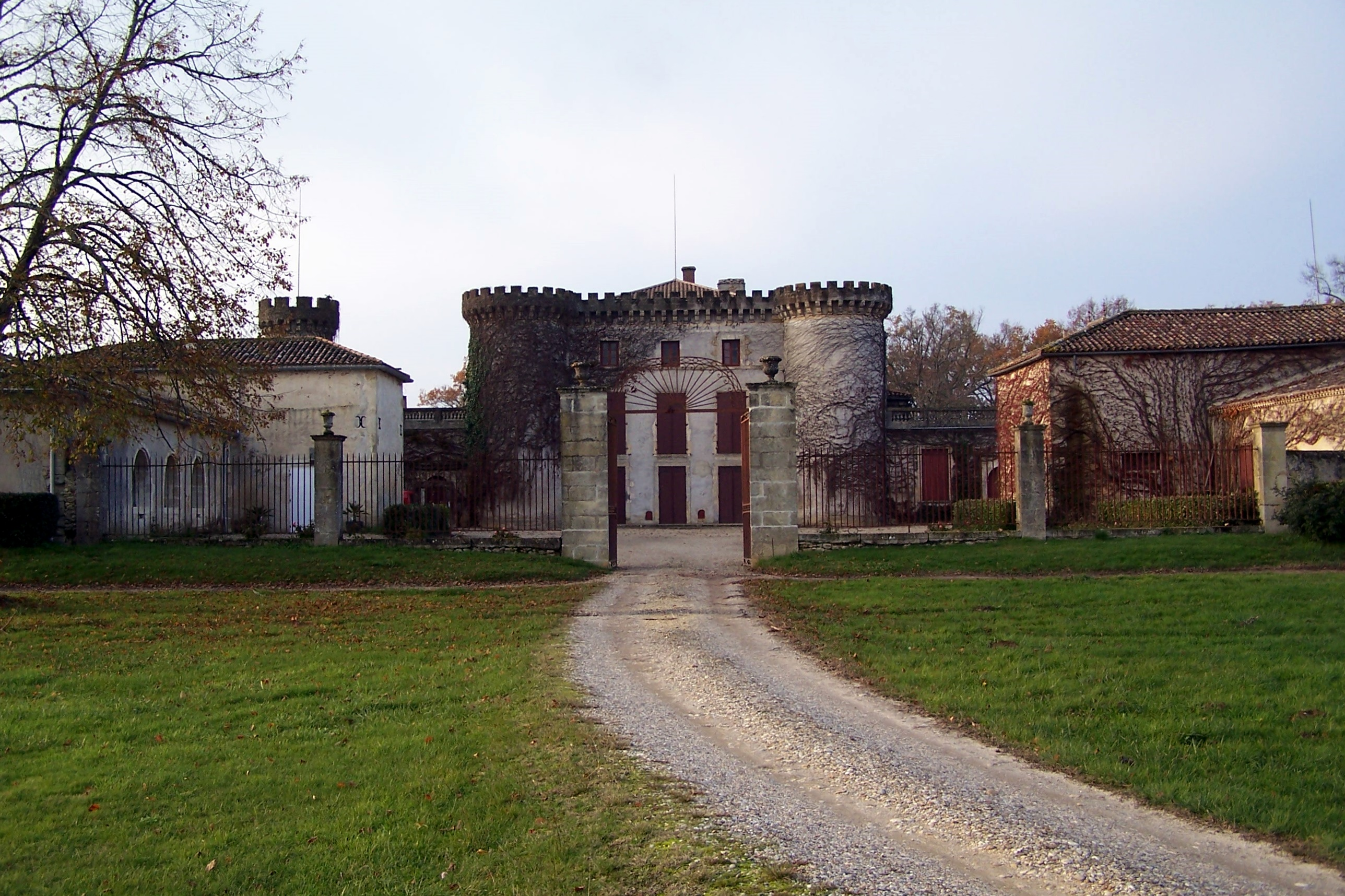
The Mirail Castle (Dec. 2010).

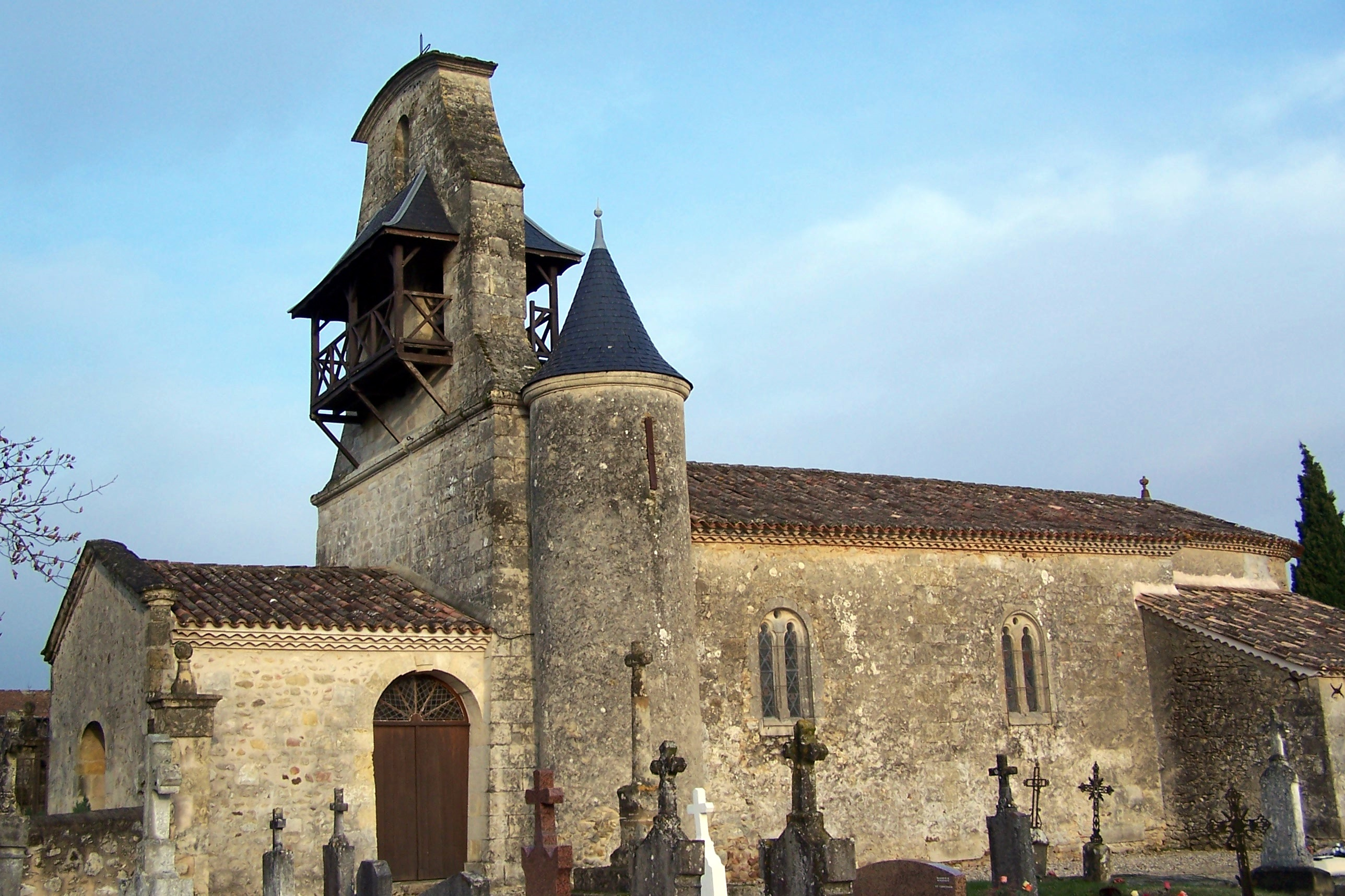
The Church of Saint Peter in Chains (Dec. 2010).

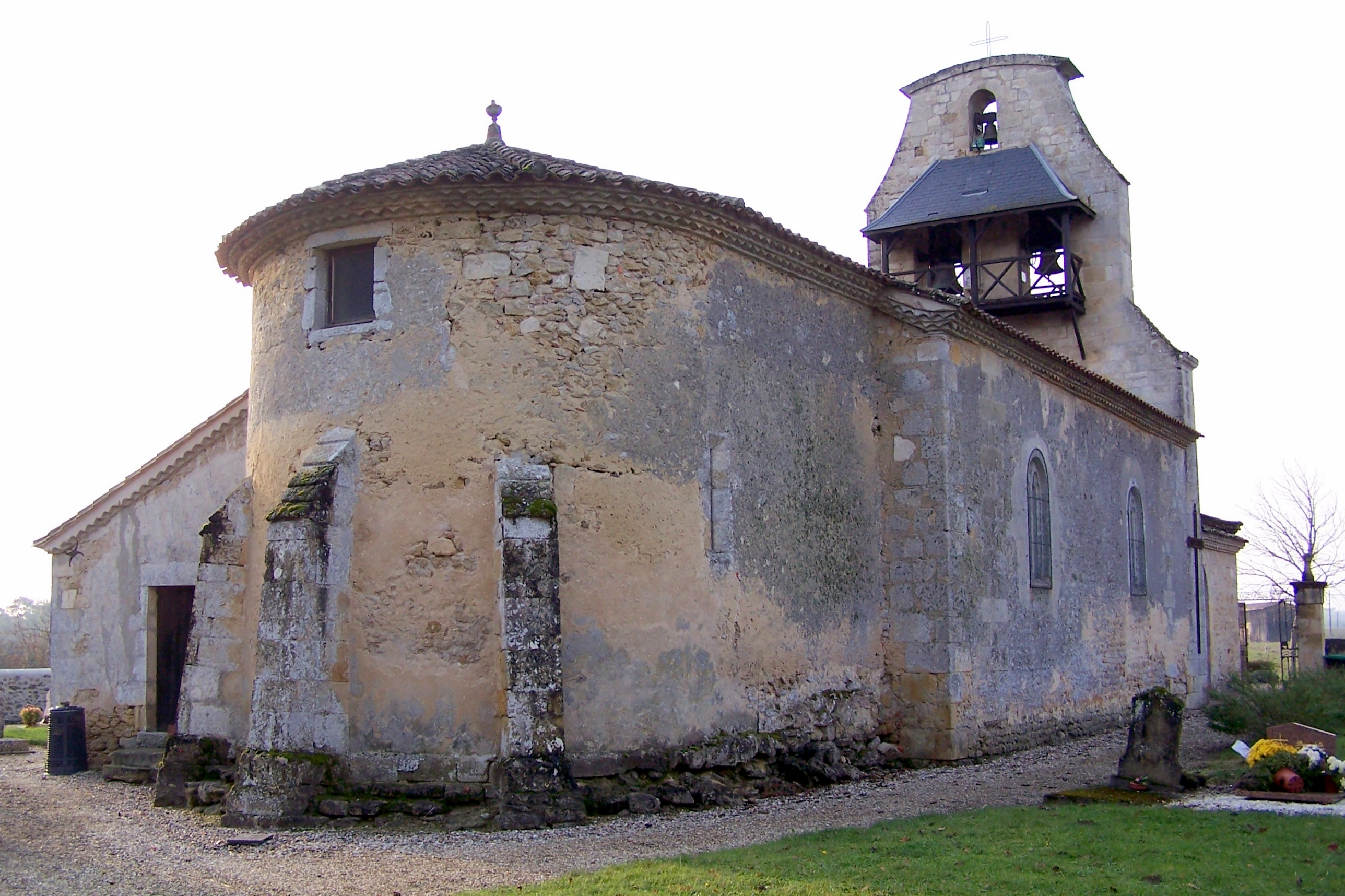
The apse of the church (Dec. 2010).

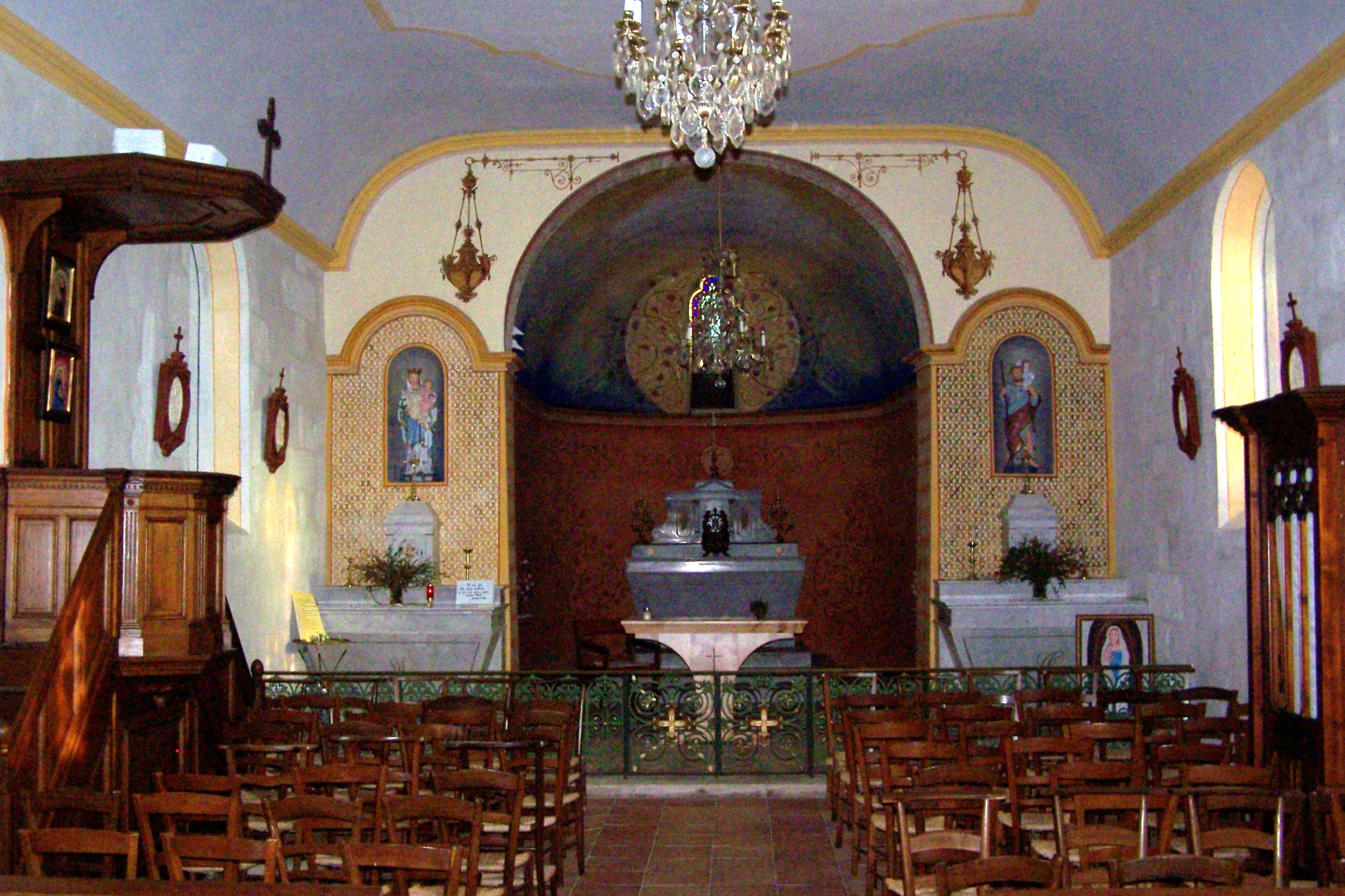
The church choir (Dec. 2010).

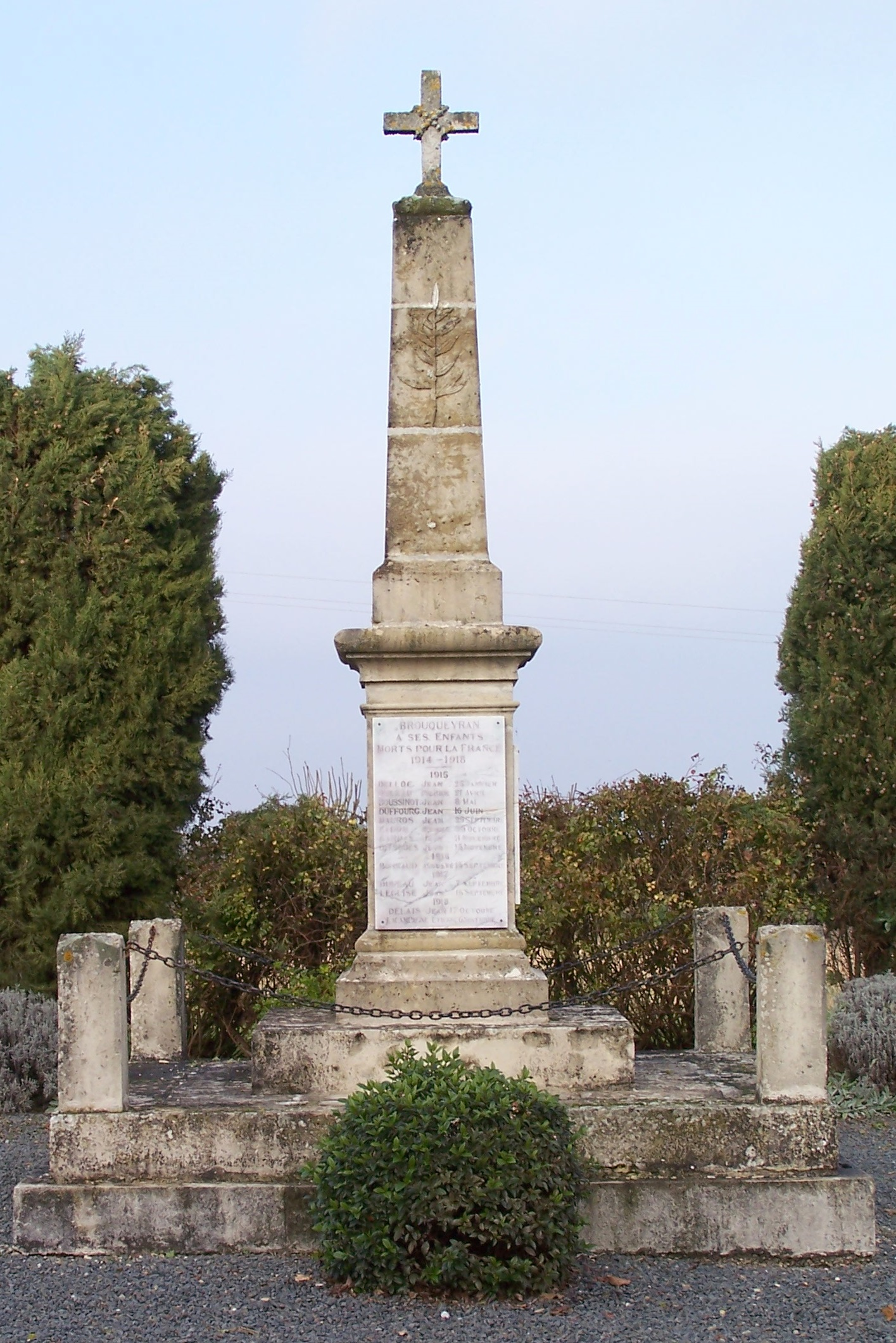
The war memorial (Dec. 2010).

=== Heraldry ===
Arms of Brouqueyran	Tierced in reversed pairle: 1st gules with two gold keys in saltire, the rings linked by a chain of the same, 2nd argent with a heather branch proper, 3rd azure with a gold lion; all surmounted by a gold field charged with the inscription “BROUQUEYRAN” in capital letters sable. The keys are attributes of Saint Peter, patron saint of the parish. Heather, in Gascon bruquèra, is said to have given its name to the town. Finally, the lion is the emblem of Gascony but also appears on the coat of arms of the Marbotin family, former lords of the Château du Mirail. Adopted on July 12, 2023

== See also ==
- Communes of the Gironde department
