= Château du Mirail =

Château du Mirail may refer to:

- Château du Mirail (Brouqueyran)
- Château du Mirail (Toulouse)
