= Auros =

- Commune
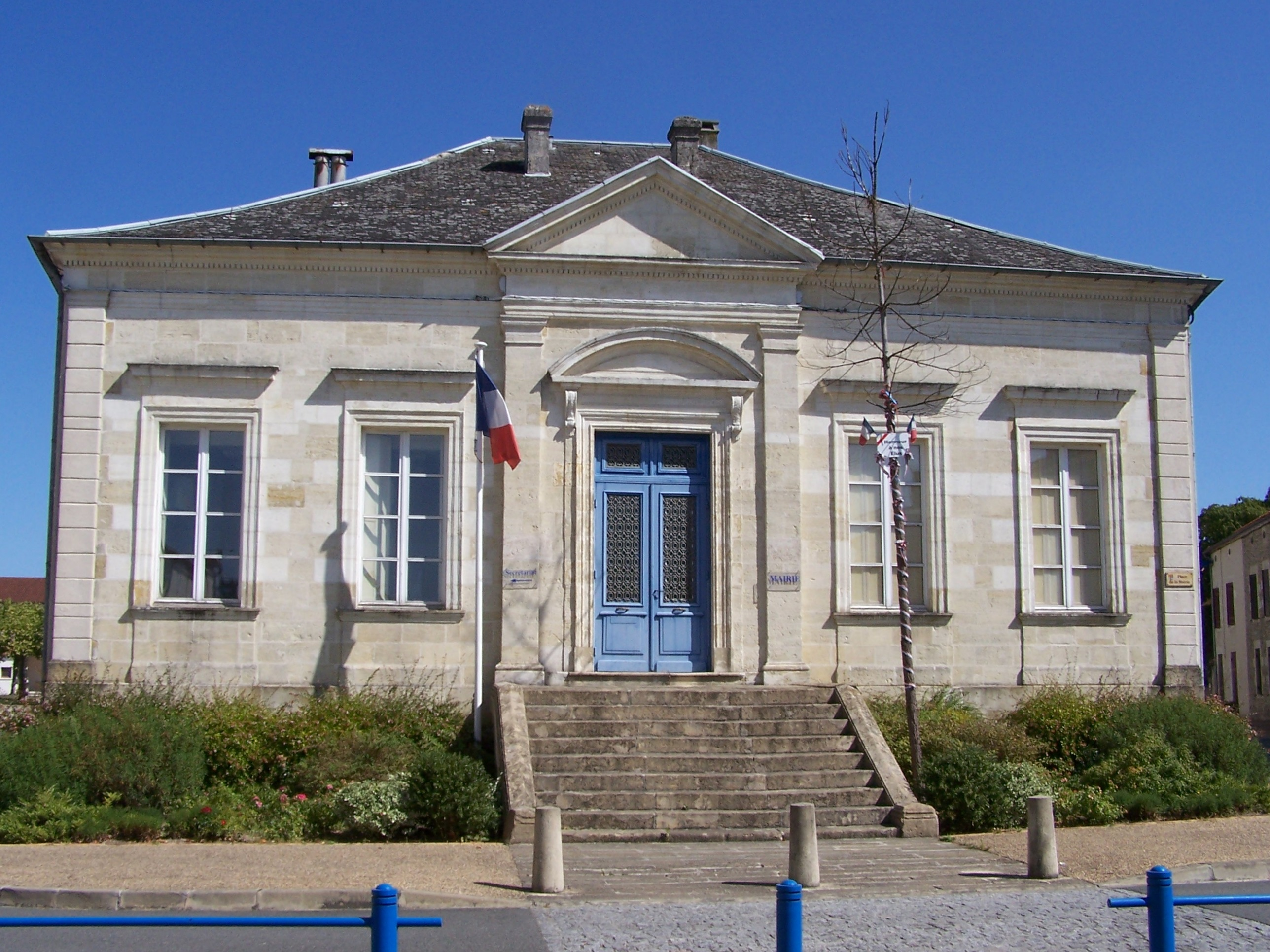
- Town hall

- Coat of arms
- Location of Auros
- Location within France Location within Nouvelle-Aquitaine
- Coordinates: 44°29′47″N 0°08′39″W
- Country: France
- Region: Nouvelle-Aquitaine
- Department: Gironde
- Arrondissement: Langon
- Canton: Le Réolais et Les Bastides
- Intercommunality: CC Réolais Sud Gironde

Government
  - Mayor (2020–2026): Philippe Camon-Golya
- Area^{1}: 15.32 km^{2} (5.92 sq mi)
- Elevation: 104 m (341 ft)
- Highest elevation: 113 m (371 ft)
- Lowest elevation: 24 m (79 ft)
- Population (2023): 1,072
  - Density: 69.97/km^{2} (181.2/sq mi)
- Time zone: UTC+01:00 (CET)
  - Summer (DST): UTC+02:00 (CEST)
- INSEE/Postal code: 33021 /33124
- ^{1} French Land Register data, which excludes lakes, ponds, glaciers > 1 km^{2} (0.386 sq mi or 247 acres) and river estuaries.

Auros (French pronunciation: [oʁɔs]; Gascon: Auròs) is a commune in the Gironde department in southwestern France.

== Population ==
Historical population
Year	Pop.	±% p.a.
1968	623	—
1975	609	−0.32%
1982	645	+0.82%
1990	669	+0.46%
1999	662	−0.12%
2007	838	+2.99%
2012	988	+3.35%
2017	1,020	+0.64%
2023	1,072	+0.83%
Source: INSEE

== See also ==
- Communes of the Gironde department
