= Lados =

- Commune
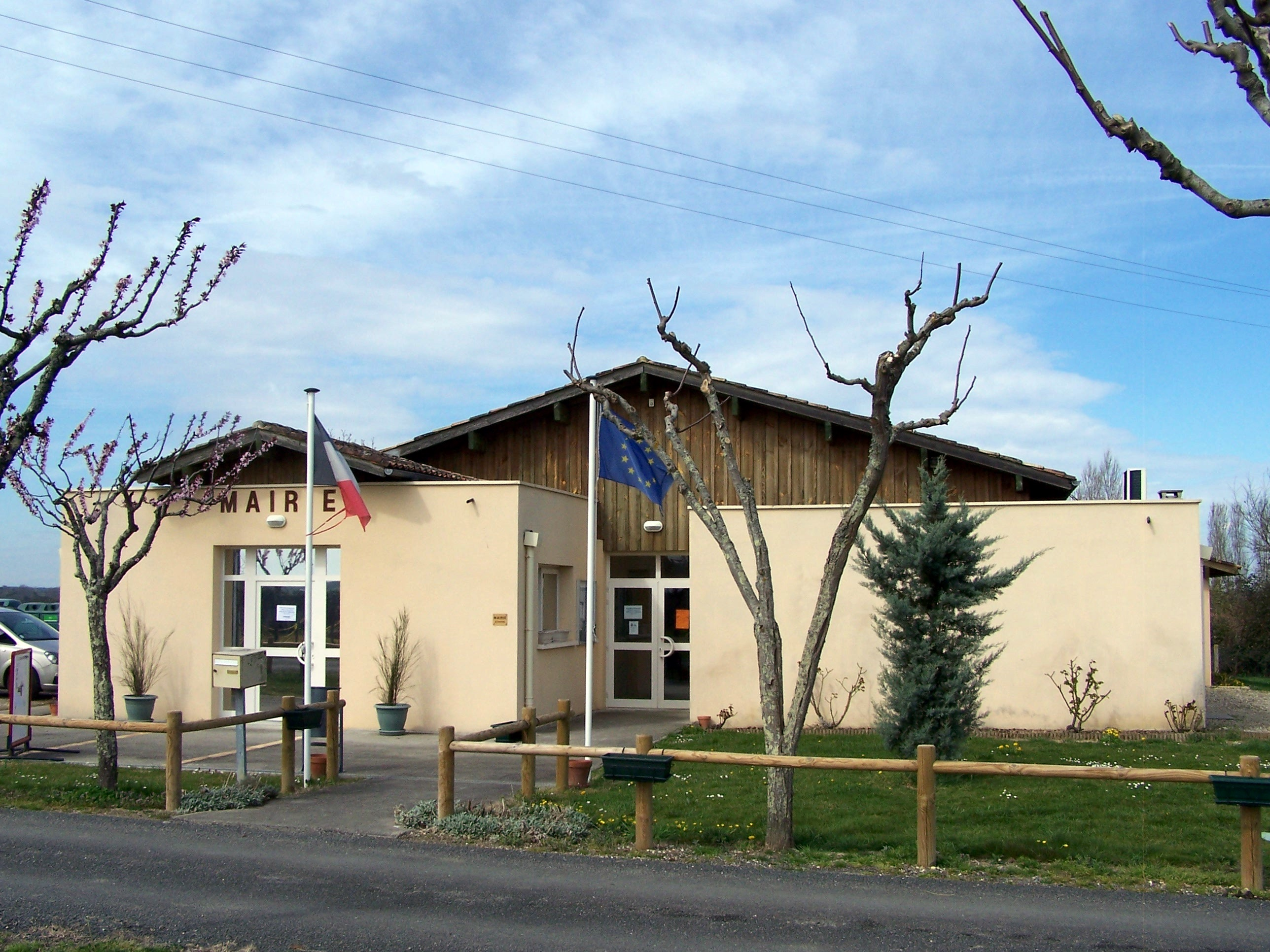
- Town hall
- Location of Lados
- Location within France Location within Nouvelle-Aquitaine
- Coordinates: 44°28′06″N 0°08′47″W
- Country: France
- Region: Nouvelle-Aquitaine
- Department: Gironde
- Arrondissement: Langon
- Canton: Le Réolais et Les Bastides
- Intercommunality: Bazadais

Government
  - Mayor (2020–2026): Martine Francelin
- Area^{1}: 6.49 km^{2} (2.51 sq mi)
- Elevation: 113 m (371 ft)
- Highest elevation: 130 m (430 ft)
- Lowest elevation: 35 m (115 ft)
- Population (2023): 180
  - Density: 28/km^{2} (72/sq mi)
- Time zone: UTC+01:00 (CET)
  - Summer (DST): UTC+02:00 (CEST)
- INSEE/Postal code: 33216 /33124
- ^{1} French Land Register data, which excludes lakes, ponds, glaciers > 1 km^{2} (0.386 sq mi or 247 acres) and river estuaries.

Lados is a commune in the Gironde department in Nouvelle-Aquitaine in southwestern France.

== Population ==
Historical population
Year	Pop.	±% p.a.
1968	114	—
1975	111	−0.38%
1982	106	−0.66%
1990	115	+1.02%
1999	115	+0.00%
2007	134	+1.93%
2012	163	+4.00%
2017	174	+1.31%
2023	180	+0.57%
Source: INSEE

== See also ==
- Communes of the Gironde department
