= Château du Mirail (Toulouse) =

French castle

Coordinates: 43°34′37″N 1°23′54″E

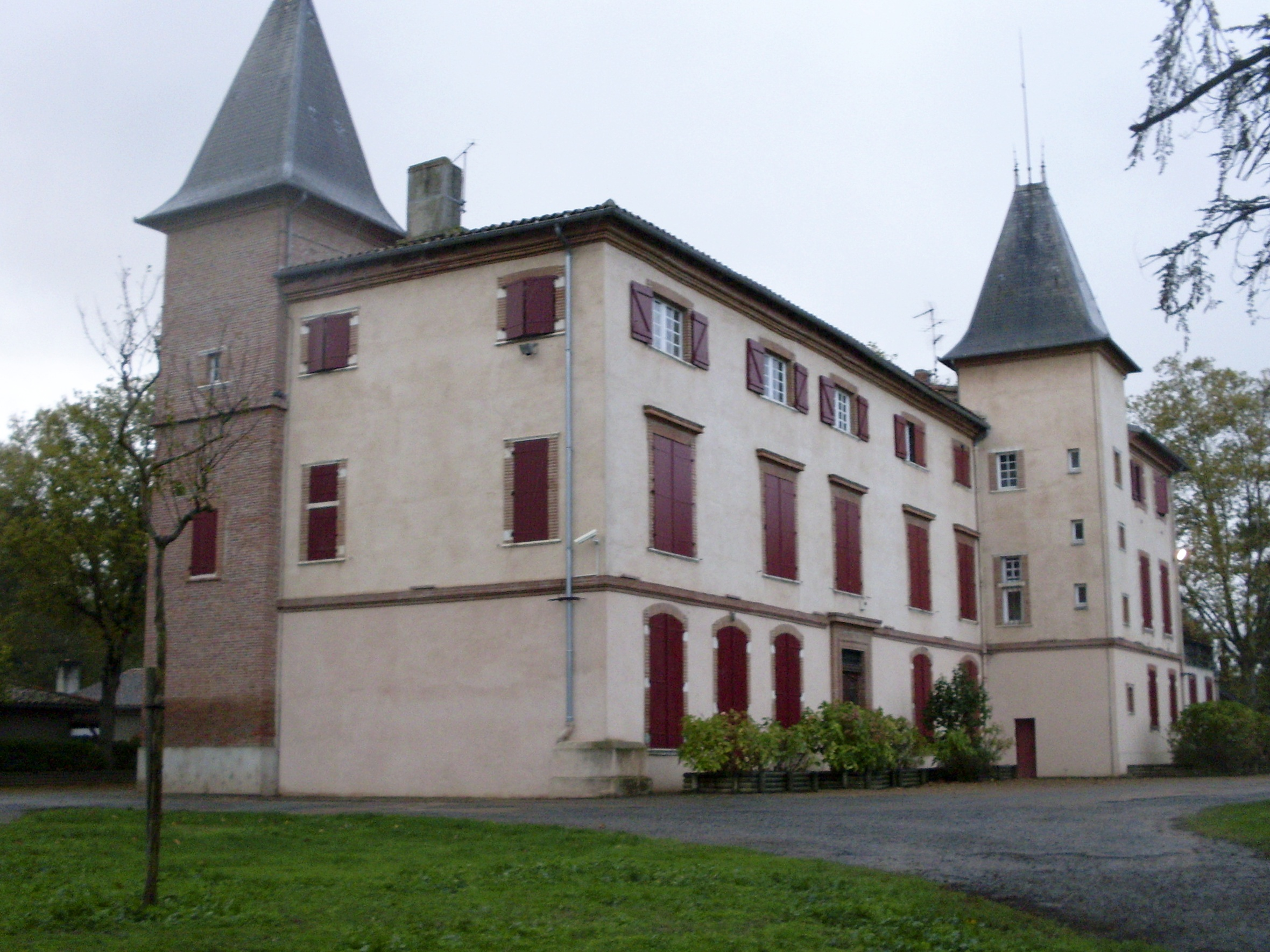

The Château du Mirail is a castle in Toulouse.

The Château du Mirail was commissioned by Guillaume de Mondran and built in 1680. The 52-hectare surrounding park was landscaped between 1700 and 1720. In 1740, the castle was sold to Jesuit novitiates. In 1763, the Jesuit cult was banned in France. Monsieur Verse and Henri de Melier successively owned the castle. Monsieur de Saint Quentin became the new owner in 1777 and renovated the park, creating the small pond, the main stairs and a long canal. In 1829, the Sabatier family, new owners, built the dovecote. In 1898, the Lapersonne family bought the Château du Mirail.
