= Espiet =

- Commune
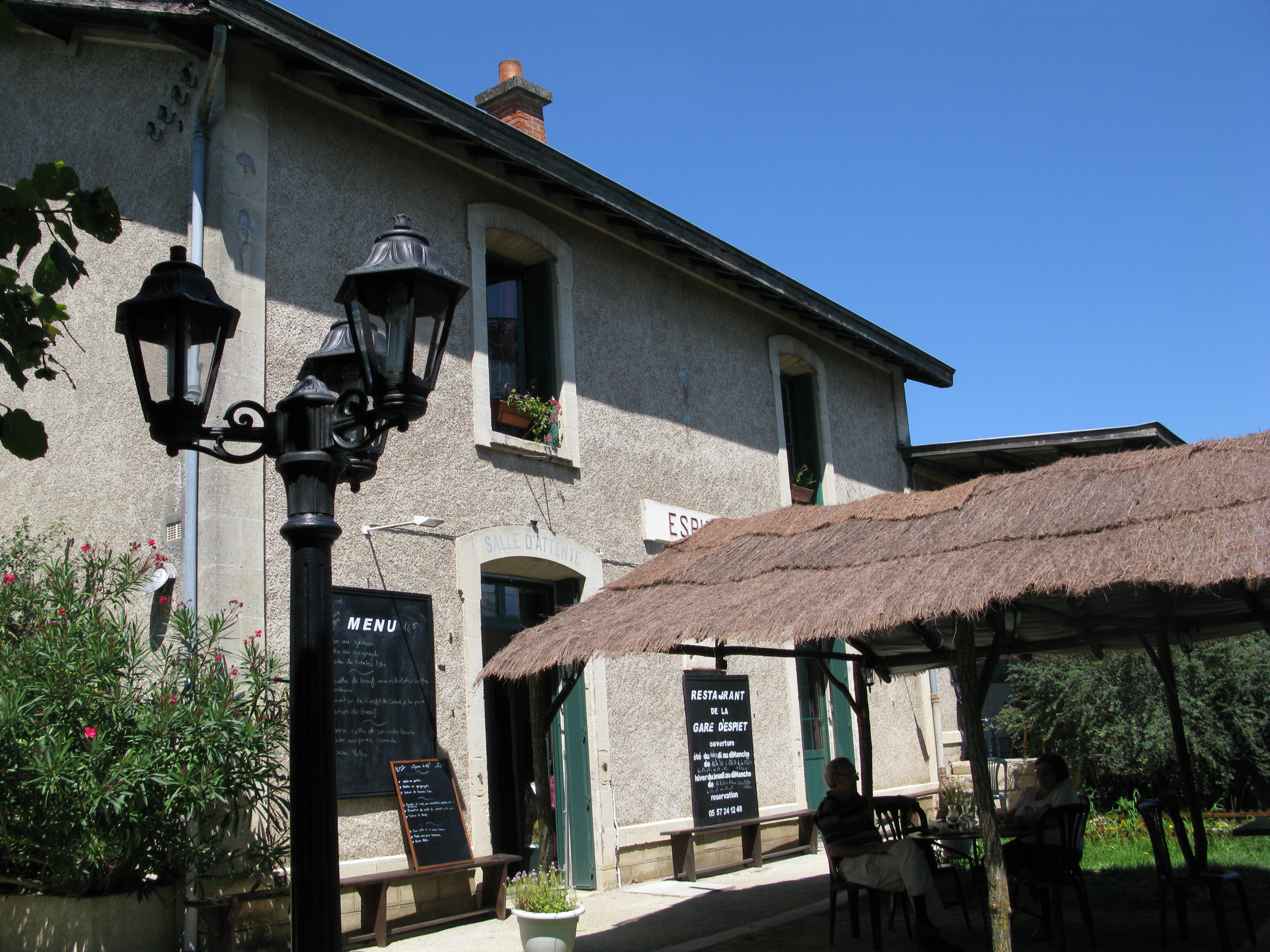
- Former train station, now a restaurant

- Coat of arms
- Location of Espiet
- Location within France Location within Nouvelle-Aquitaine
- Coordinates: 44°48′27″N 0°15′55″W
- Country: France
- Region: Nouvelle-Aquitaine
- Department: Gironde
- Arrondissement: Libourne
- Canton: Les Coteaux de Dordogne
- Intercommunality: CA Libournais

Government
  - Mayor (2020–2026): Didier Cazenave
- Area^{1}: 6.79 km^{2} (2.62 sq mi)
- Elevation: 55 m (180 ft)
- Highest elevation: 75 m (246 ft)
- Lowest elevation: 14 m (46 ft)
- Population (2023): 741
  - Density: 109/km^{2} (283/sq mi)
- Time zone: UTC+01:00 (CET)
  - Summer (DST): UTC+02:00 (CEST)
- INSEE/Postal code: 33157 /33420
- ^{1} French Land Register data, which excludes lakes, ponds, glaciers > 1 km^{2} (0.386 sq mi or 247 acres) and river estuaries.

Espiet is a commune in the Gironde department in southwestern France.

== Population ==
Historical population
Year	Pop.	±% p.a.
1968	429	—
1975	388	−1.42%
1982	395	+0.26%
1990	435	+1.21%
1999	532	+2.26%
2007	672	+2.96%
2012	735	+1.81%
2017	776	+1.09%
2023	741	−0.77%
Source: INSEE

== See also ==
- Communes of the Gironde department
