= Cazats =

- Commune
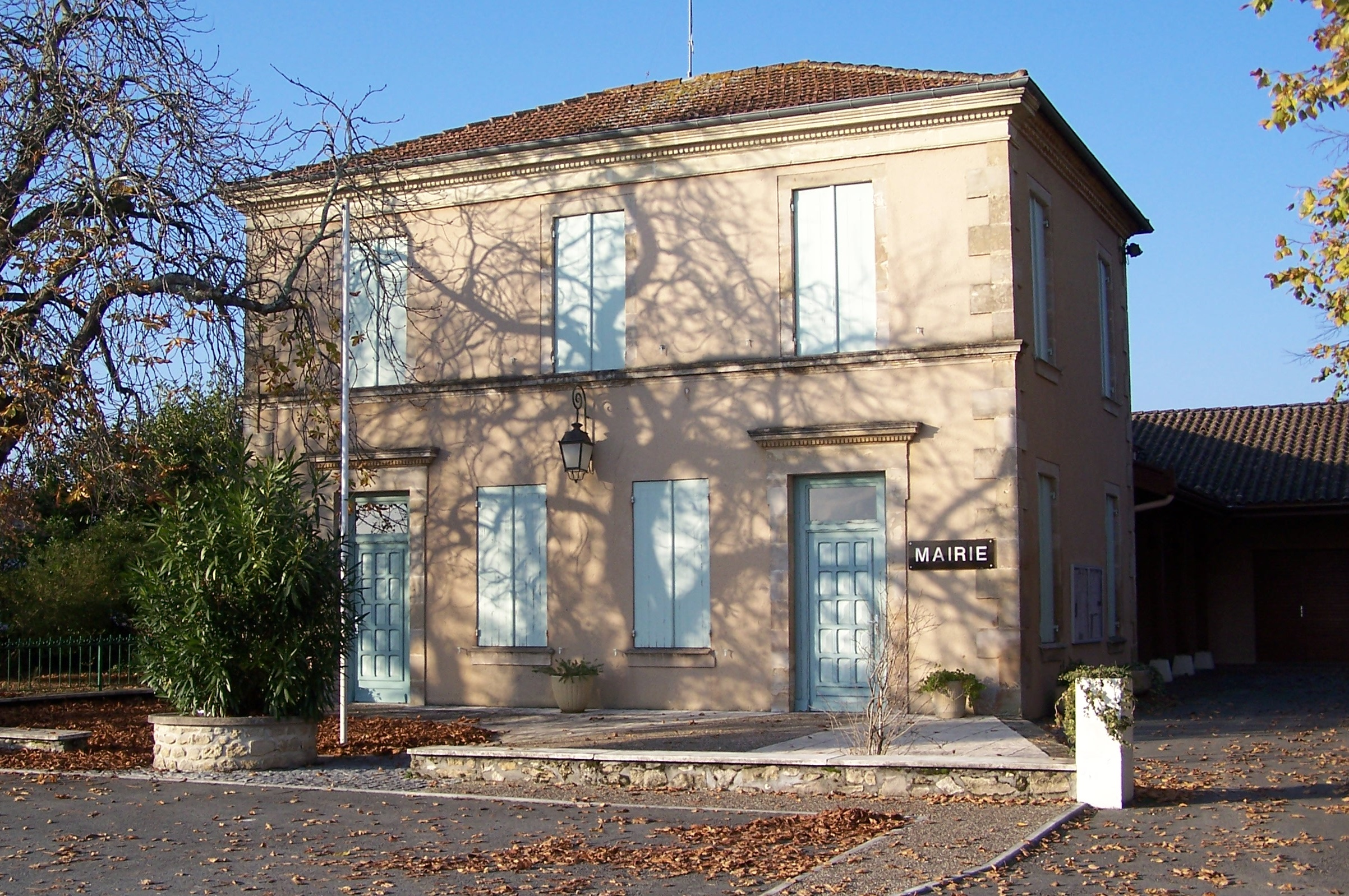
- Town hall
- Location of Cazats
- Location within France Location within Nouvelle-Aquitaine
- Coordinates: 44°28′21″N 0°12′24″W
- Country: France
- Region: Nouvelle-Aquitaine
- Department: Gironde
- Arrondissement: Langon
- Canton: Le Sud-Gironde
- Intercommunality: Bazadais

Government
  - Mayor (2020–2026): David Attimont
- Area^{1}: 7.48 km^{2} (2.89 sq mi)
- Elevation: 109 m (358 ft)
- Highest elevation: 124 m (407 ft)
- Lowest elevation: 38 m (125 ft)
- Population (2023): 400
  - Density: 53/km^{2} (140/sq mi)
- Time zone: UTC+01:00 (CET)
  - Summer (DST): UTC+02:00 (CEST)
- INSEE/Postal code: 33116 /33430
- ^{1} French Land Register data, which excludes lakes, ponds, glaciers > 1 km^{2} (0.386 sq mi or 247 acres) and river estuaries.

Cazats (French pronunciation: [kazats]; Gascon: Casats) is a commune in the Gironde department in Nouvelle-Aquitaine in southwestern France.

== Population ==
Historical population
Year	Pop.	±% p.a.
1968	225	—
1975	197	−1.88%
1982	213	+1.12%
1990	211	−0.12%
1999	224	+0.67%
2007	314	+4.31%
2012	315	+0.06%
2017	426	+6.22%
2023	400	−1.04%
Source: INSEE

== See also ==
- Communes of the Gironde department
