= Château du Mirail (Brouqueyran) =

Château in Nouvelle-Aquitaine, France

Coordinates: 44°28′52″N 0°10′27″W

Château du Mirail is a château in Gironde, Nouvelle-Aquitaine, France.

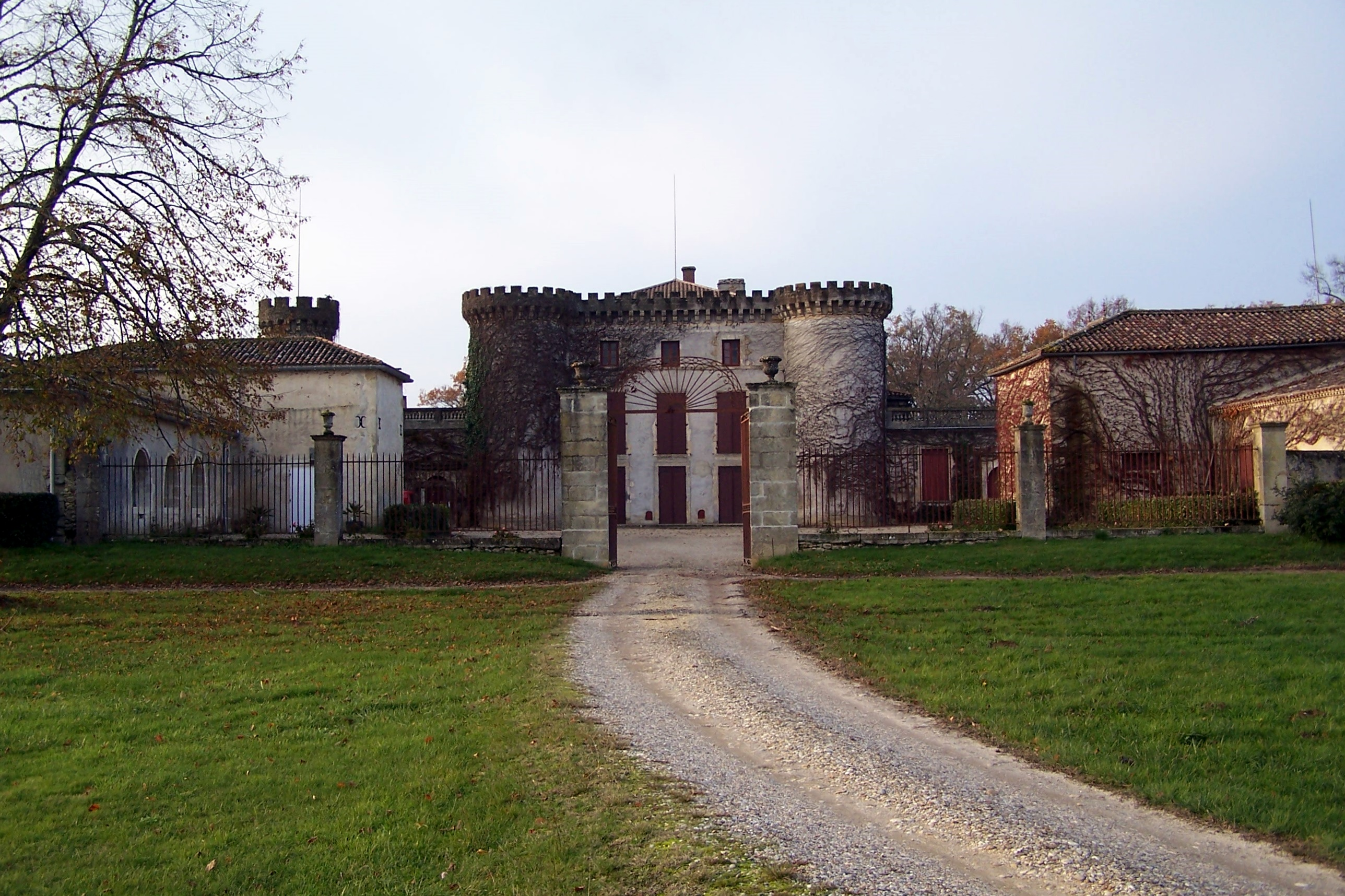
