= 2026 Landes forest wildfire =

Wildfire in France

- Mobilisation of European civil protection resources in France and Spain on 28 July 2026.
- Date: 22 July 2026 – 17 August 2026
- Location: Gironde and Landes, Nouvelle-Aquitaine, France

Statistics
- Burned area: 42,000 ha (100,000 acres)+ in Gironde

Impacts
- Deaths: 0 civilians
- Injuries: 330+ firefighters in Gironde; 5 firefighters in Landes
- Evacuated: 220,000+ in Gironde; 31,000+ in Landes
- Structures destroyed: 140 houses in Gironde; 198 buildings in Landes

Ignition
- Cause: Accidental

The 2026 Landes forest fires, in France, are a series of wildfires affecting several areas of the Landes de Gascogne forest massif, in the departments of Gironde and Landes, beginning on 22 July 2026.

As of 17 August 2026, a total of 47,004 hectares (116,150 acres) of forest has been destroyed, 88 firefighters have been injured, and more than 240 buildings have been destroyed by the flames.

Smoke from the Saumos fire reached the Bordeaux urban area and, farther north, was seen in Royan, in the department of Charente-Maritime, and as far as the departments of Vienne and Deux-Sèvres.

These fires are considered the most devastating in France in more than 50 years, although they have not surpassed the 1949 fires, which killed 82 people and burned 52,000 hectares (130,000 acres).

They occurred in the context of a drought episode and heat waves in France and Europe, whose high intensity was made significantly more likely by climate change caused by human activities, particularly the burning of coal, oil and natural gas. Through these weather conditions, global warming has increased wildfire risk in the Landes and Gironde region where the fires broke out.

In Landes, the communes of Biscarrosse, Sanguinet and Parentis-en-Born were also affected by a fire. 3,500 hectares (8,600 acres) burned, resulting in the evacuation of 40,000 people from the communes of Biscarrosse, Parentis-en-Born and Sanguinet. Five firefighters were injured in this area.

In Gironde, the fires resulted in the evacuation of 220,000 people from the communes of Saumos, Arès, Marcheprime, Le Temple, Audenge, Andernos-les-Bains, Biganos, Cestas, Mios, Le Barp, Saint-Jean-d'Illac, Martignas-sur-Jalle, Saint-Médard-en-Jalles, Saint-Aubin-de-Médoc, Eysines (outside the ring road) and Mérignac (outside the ring road).

Residents and tourists were evacuated by land, either by buses chartered by the Nouvelle-Aquitaine region or by their own means, and also by sea from the Cap Ferret peninsula north to Lacanau and east to Lanton.

The fires spread in several phases and required the intervention of more than 2,750 firefighters from Nouvelle-Aquitaine, other regions of France and other countries. More than 2,940 members of the National Gendarmerie, Mobile Gendarmerie, National Police and French Armed Forces were also mobilized to support population-protection operations and limit the spread of the fires eastward, particularly toward the Bordeaux metropolitan area. Police and gendarmerie forces were also deployed in evacuated communes to prevent looting.

The wildfires in Gironde caused a significant deterioration in air quality across a broad northwest–southeast band extending as far as the Mediterranean Sea, due to the large quantity of particulate matter carried by the smoke. Public debate has focused on climate change adaptation, efforts to contain climate change, greenhouse gas emissions-reduction pathways, the availability of aerial firefighting resources, as well as forest management involving monocultures of pine.

== Background ==
=== Role of climate change ===
Although wildfires may be caused by human activity, whether accidental or deliberate, or by natural causes such as lightning, climate change increases wildfire risk in France, particularly through the increasing frequency and intensity of heat waves and droughts, which constitute two of the three parameters of the 30-30-30 rule.

The first half of 2026 was marked, particularly in Western Europe, by soil drought caused by a precipitation deficit and high temperatures. An attribution study by World Weather Attribution (WWA), published in July 2026, concluded that climate change had increased the severity of the drought through higher temperatures. The heat wave that occurred in June 2026, whose intensity was itself amplified by climate change, contributed to the drying of soils and vegetation in France, thereby increasing the risk of wildfires.

A rapid attribution study published by WWA on 30 July 2026 concluded, by comparison with past observations, that the wildfire risk observed during the seven days when it was at its highest (6–12 July) in the departments of Gironde and Landes would have been at least twice as low in the absence of climate change.

=== Firefighting resources ===
The deputy general secretary of the National Union of Civil Aviation Flight Personnel explained that only seven of France's twelve Canadair aircraft were available to fight fires in France, because the other aircraft were undergoing maintenance, despite warnings at the beginning of the summer. Several media outlets have also pointed for several years to the fact that public services have been deprived of resources, with the National Forestry Office having seen its staffing cut over the previous twenty years, falling from 15,000 in 1985 to 8,055 in 2025.

== Progression ==
Mobilization of European civil protection resources in France and Spain on 28 July 2026.

Progression of the Gironde fire, with the evacuated area shown in red.

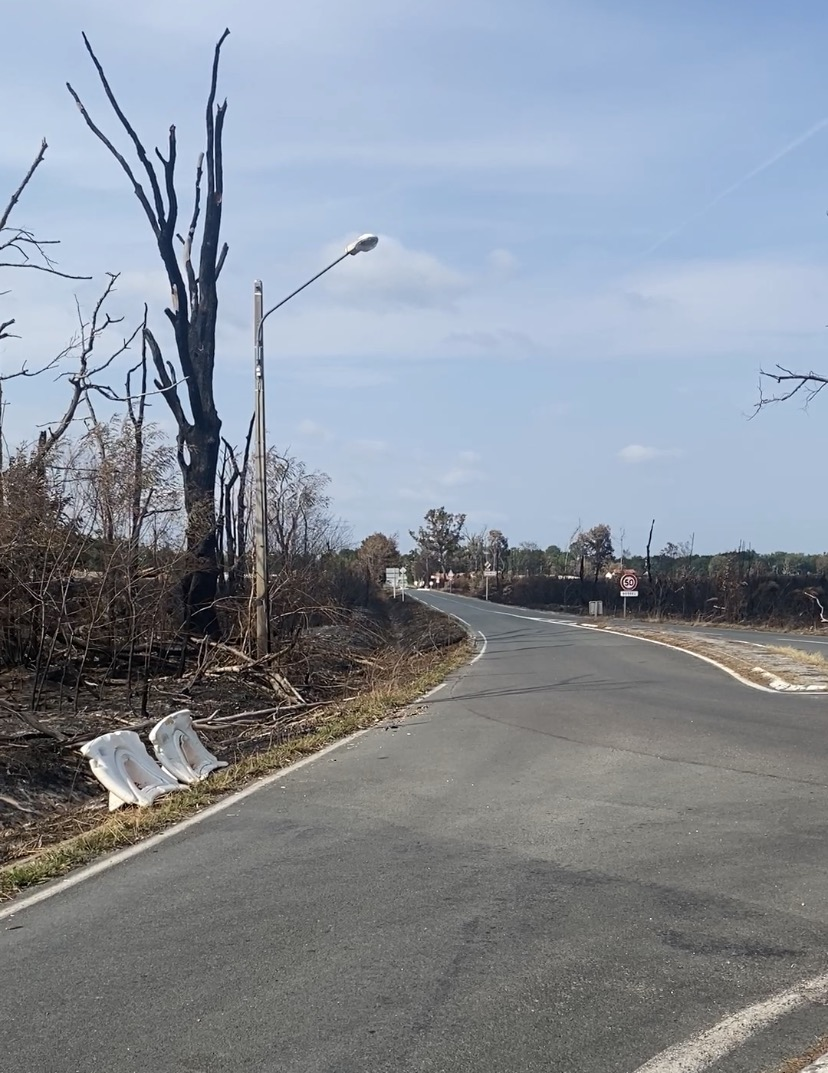
Vegetation burned by the flames at the entrance to the town of Saumos, where the fire started.

On the afternoon of 22 July 2026, a fire was reported in the commune of Saumos, beginning to ravage the monocultures of maritime pine that make up the local forest massif. According to initial findings, the fire was accidentally caused by brush-clearing work commissioned by Enedis, despite unfavourable conditions, although such work was authorized until 13:00. By the end of the day, 1,400 hectares (3,500 acres) had burned. The rapid spread of the fire was favoured by the drought affecting Europe.

=== Gironde fire ===
On 23 July 2026, the fire had burned 4,800 hectares (12,000 acres) and caused the evacuation of 20,000 people. With the wind blowing towards the southwest, the fire reached the town of Lège-Cap-Ferret, where houses were burned. As the fire reached some houses in Lège, authorities and firefighters feared that it could cross and cut the RD106, the only road providing access to and from the Cap Ferret peninsula, which at that time contained many residents and tourists. A preventive evacuation of the entire peninsula was therefore decided during the night of 23–24 July. More than 1,200 people were evacuated by sea to Arcachon, while the remainder were evacuated by land, by bus or by their own means. In total, 36,000 people were evacuated from the Cap Ferret peninsula.

On 24 July 2026, the fire had burned 19,000 hectares (47,000 acres), and 110,000 people were evacuated by land or sea, from the Cap Ferret peninsula northwards to Lacanau or eastwards to Lanton. The fire had covered 30,000 hectares (74,000 acres), and 42 firefighters had been injured. Driven by westerly winds, the fire threatened the Bordeaux metropolitan area and exposed the population to toxic smoke. Military resources were deployed to protect the metropolitan area and its sensitive sites from the spread of the fire. At 18:00, a pyrocumulonimbus developed, capable of producing ember attacks, posing a major risk to the metropolitan area. Preventive evacuations on an unprecedented scale were organized in the most exposed areas of communes outside the ring road: Saint-Médard-en-Jalles (33,000 people), Le Haillan (11,400), Saint-Jean-d'Illac (9,600), Martignas-sur-Jalle (8,000), Saint-Aubin-de-Médoc (7,800), as well as Mérignac (78,000) and Eysines (24,800), with only populations living outside the ring road concerned in the latter two communes. In total, 167,000 people were displaced. The fire destroyed 140 houses in Gironde. Smartphone notifications through the FR-Alert system were issued to warn the population and carry out evacuations ordered by the prefectures. President Emmanuel Macron activated the European Union Civil Protection Mechanism, allowing the forces engaged in firefighting to receive reinforcements consisting of two Croatian Canadair CL-415 aircraft, two Portuguese Air Tractor aircraft, and two Czech and Slovak Sikorsky UH-60 Black Hawk helicopters.

During the night of 24–25 July in Gironde, the threat diminished because of increased humidity and winds shifting northward, particularly exposing the communes of Lacanau and Sainte-Hélène. At midday on 25 July 2026, the official assessment for the Saumos fire in Gironde was more than 32,000 hectares (79,000 acres) burned and 167,000 people evacuated. The fire was no longer convective but remained dangerous. In Le Porge, 183 houses burned. The department was placed under Météo-France's black wildfire warning level. Holidaymakers were advised to postpone their arrival in Gironde, while affected train tickets were postponed or refunded. An initial drop of fire retardant was carried out by an A400M of the French Air and Space Force. This was part of a major military reinforcement involving 1,500 personnel, supported by a Reaper drone, an Airbus A330 MRTT and an NH90 helicopter.

On the morning of 26 July, the wind pushed the fire southeastward. An area between Blagon and Croix d'Hins was ablaze. Sophie Brocas, prefect of Gironde and of the Nouvelle-Aquitaine region, ordered the preventive evacuation of an additional 55,000 people in Marcheprime, Le Barp, Biganos, Mios and Cestas, bringing the total number of evacuees to 220,000, making it the largest evacuation since the war. She stated that 42,000 hectares (100,000 acres) had burned, including 10,000 hectares (25,000 acres) in 24 hours.

Satellite animation of Sentinel-2 imagery between 21 and 26 July.

During the preceding night, the A63 motorway was closed for nearly 70 kilometres (43 mi), from interchange 15 of the Bordeaux ring road to exit 23 at Marcheprime in the Bordeaux–Spain direction, and from exit 17 at Liposthey to interchange 15 of the ring road in the Spain–Bordeaux direction.

Rail services operated by TER Nouvelle-Aquitaine and TGV Sud from Bordeaux towards Dax and Hendaye, Arcachon, Mont-de-Marsan, and Pau and Tarbes were suspended that morning.

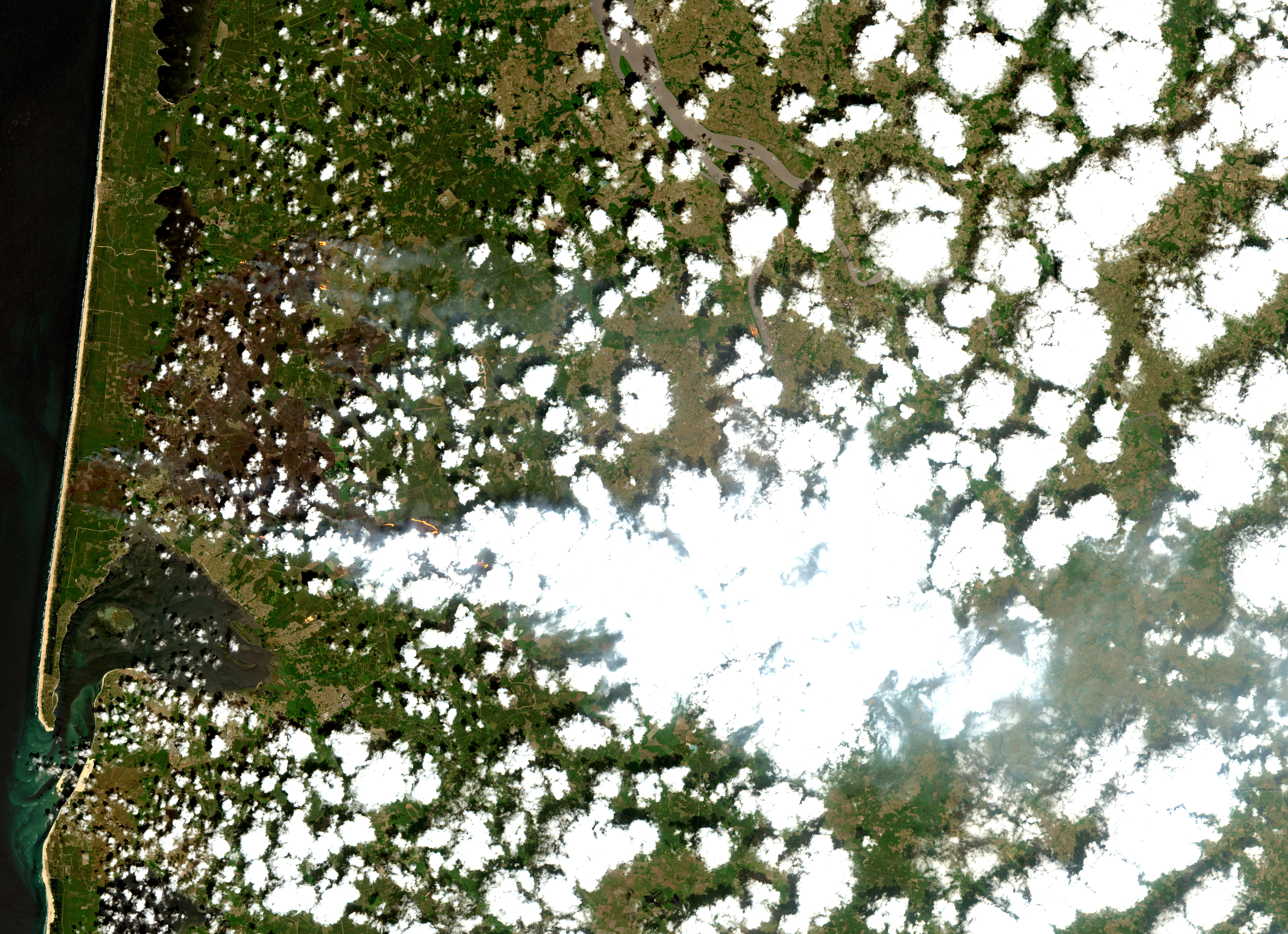
Satellite image of the fire taken on 26 July by Sentinel-2.

On the morning of 27 July, on the eve of another forecast heat wave, weather conditions were favourable in terms of humidity, temperature and wind speed, with light northerly winds. Security forces took advantage of the conditions to widen or create appropriate firebreaks. Municipalities also took initiatives to do so.

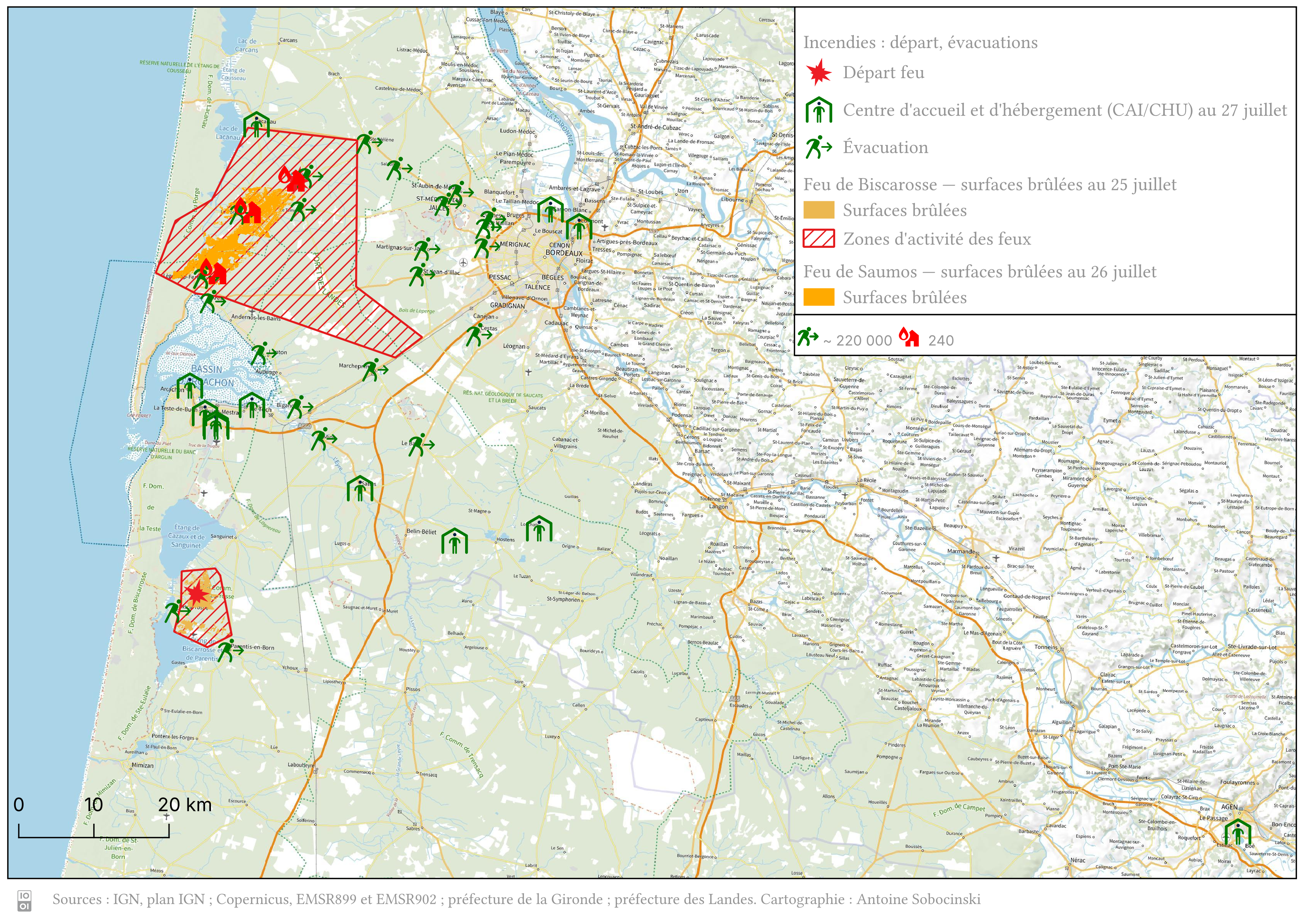
Evacuations and accommodation centres on 27 July.

On the morning of 28 July, the fire was stable, but the forecast of westerly/northwesterly winds led authorities to evacuate 4,000 tourists from holiday accommodation in Lacanau. At the same time, 60,000 of the 222,000 evacuees were allowed to return home in Mérignac, Le Haillan and Eysines, while remaining prepared in case the threat worsened.

By 29 July, 121 kilometres (75 mi) of firebreaks had been constructed, while the winds shifted eastward. The fire no longer advanced geographically, but firefighters continued to tackle several flare-ups.

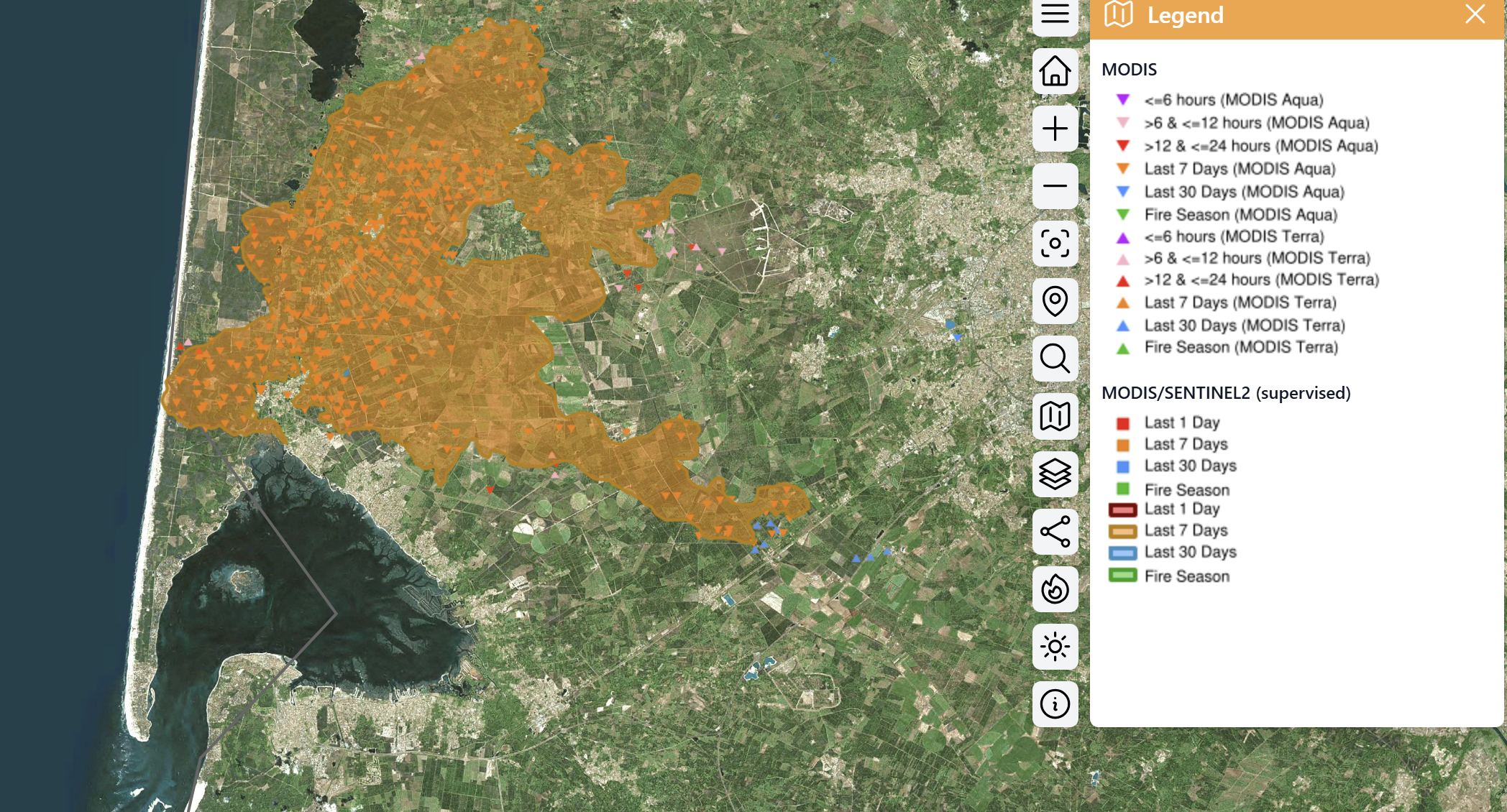
Situation on 29 July 2026 showing burned areas and fire starts, as mapped by EFFIS.

On 30 July, 84,000 residents of nine communes were authorized to return home: Mios, Le Barp, Cestas, Saint-Jean-d'Illac, Martignas-sur-Jalle, Saint-Médard-en-Jalles, Saint-Aubin-de-Médoc, Salaunes and Sainte-Hélène, bringing the total to 144,000 people. In the evening, the fire was considered "stabilized".

On 31 July, residents of Biganos, Lanton, Andernos-les-Bains and Audenge were allowed to return home, followed the next day by residents of Arès, Marcheprime, Le Temple and Saumos.

On 1 August 2026, the fire was "contained", meaning that it continued to burn but was no longer spreading to new areas.

On 2 August, Gironde prefect Sophie Brocas announced that residents of Lège-Cap-Ferret, the entire peninsula, and Le Porge were authorized to return to their homes.

On 3 August, reintegration was authorized for the last communes still under evacuation: from 14:00 for the town of Lège and Le Porge (except for two neighbourhoods), and from 19:00 for the peninsula (excluding campsites). The Le Ferron and Plein Soleil neighbourhoods of Le Porge were allowed to return on 4 August, after the fire revealed the presence of buried artillery shells in fields near residential areas.

=== Landes fires ===
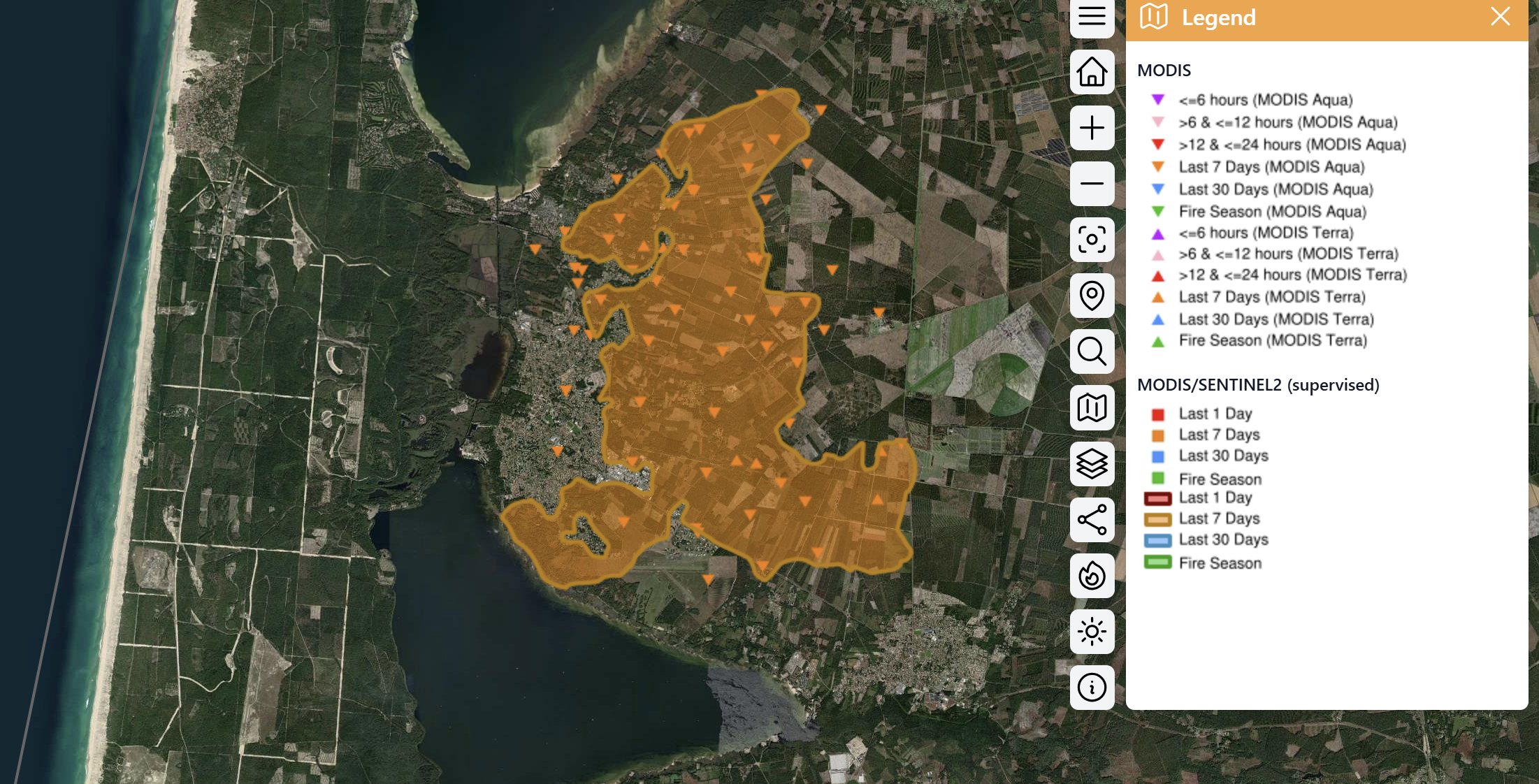
Map of burned areas near Biscarrosse on 29 July 2026, as mapped by the European Forest Fire Information System (EFFIS).

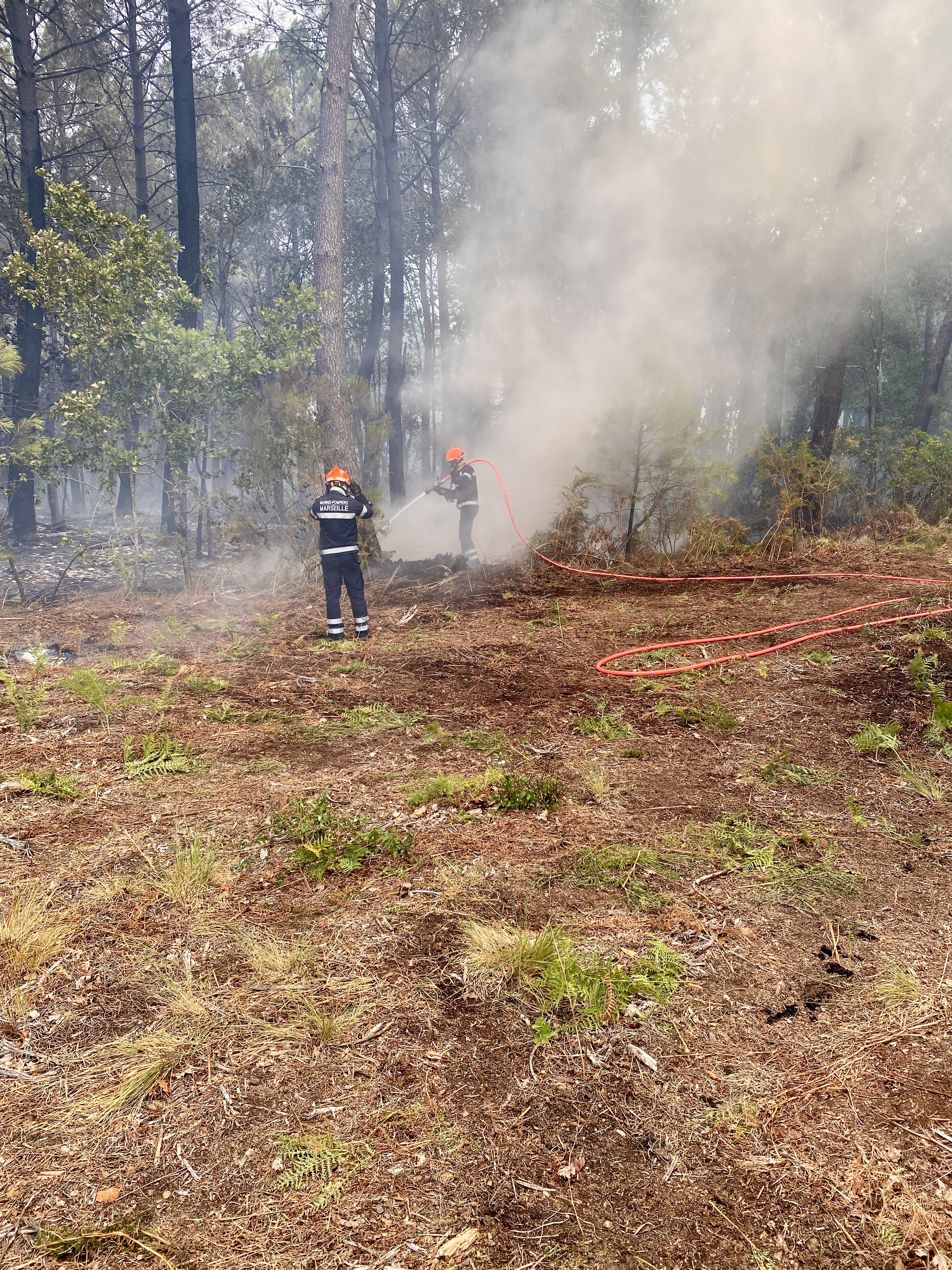
The Marseille naval firefighters, deployed as reinforcements to extinguish smouldering areas in Biscarrosse in July 2026.

On 23 July, a fire started at around 15:45 in Landes on departmental road 652 at Biscarrosse, caused by a van catching fire accidentally and the flames spreading to the surrounding vegetation.

By 24 July, 2,600 hectares (6,400 acres) had burned in Biscarrosse and Parentis-en-Born, and 23,000 people had been evacuated. Five firefighters were injured.

On the morning of 25 July, the fire had covered 3,500 hectares (8,600 acres) and 31,000 people had been evacuated from the two Landes communes. A preventive evacuation of Sanguinet was ordered. A total of 198 buildings, including houses and commercial and industrial premises, burned. The fire was not yet contained, but was better controlled, and the first residents were authorized to return.

The fire was declared contained on the evening of 27 July and brought under control on 30 July.

On 13 August, a new fire began near Luglon and Garein. After burning 1,700 hectares (4,200 acres), it was declared contained on 17 August.

== Firefighting ==
Fighting the fires in southwestern France required the mobilization of 3,300 firefighters and 1,500 military personnel. More than 330 firefighters were injured in Gironde. Eighteen aerial firefighting assets were deployed.

=== International assistance ===
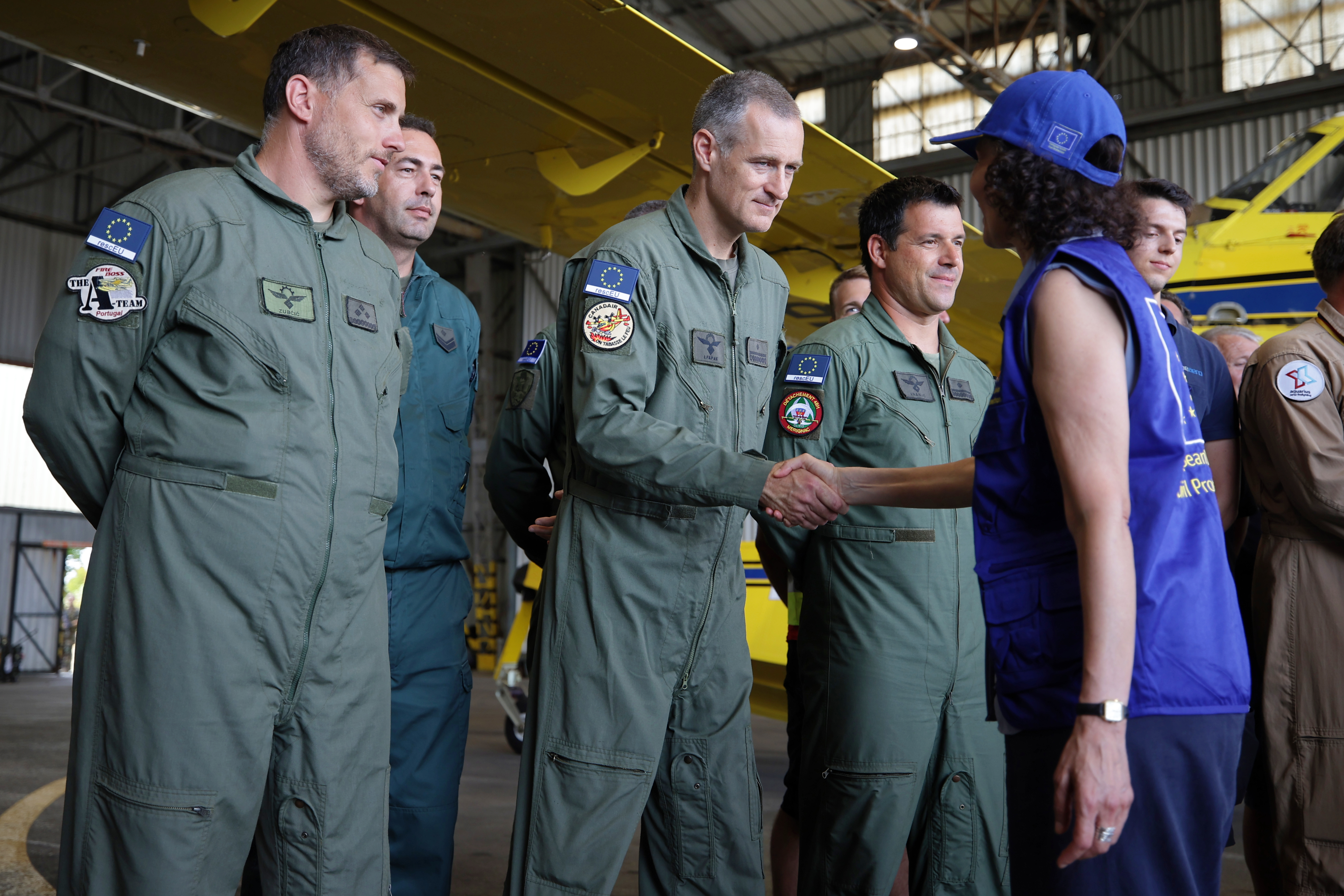
Pilots from the European rescEU mechanism deployed against the fires in Gironde, greeted by European Commissioner Hadja Lahbib.

France received assistance from numerous countries, from Portugal to Turkey, as well as Ukraine, Romania, Slovakia, the Czech Republic, Croatia, Sweden, Germany and Switzerland.

=== Civilian assistance ===
Unprecedented support was provided by farmers, private individuals, entrepreneurs and others, who took turns assisting firefighters by providing water tankers, earthmoving equipment or helping extinguish fire lines.

Animal protection measures were also undertaken by animal welfare associations active on the outskirts of the affected areas, such as the FUTUR association, which opened a crisis unit to recover domestic animals lost during evacuations and to transport wildlife requiring emergency care.

=== Medical and social assistance ===
An emergency shelter was established at the Bordeaux Exhibition Centre.

The Regional Health Agency (ARS) issued recommendations in response to the fires.

FFP2 masks were made available to healthcare professionals and vulnerable people in pharmacies.

== Assessment ==
According to researcher Sylvain Delzon of the National Research Institute for Agriculture, Food and Environment (INRAE), a distinction must be made between understory fires and crown fires when quantifying the damage.

=== Ecological and health consequences ===
The combustion of pine trees produces toxic smoke that requires protective measures (sheltering indoors, switching off mechanical ventilation systems, etc.), as well as ash containing trace metals that can be washed into waterways by rain and pollute them. The smoke contains fine particles smaller than 1 μm, volatile organic compounds that are carcinogenic, including acrolein, formaldehyde and benzene, polycyclic aromatic hydrocarbons (PAHs), carbon oxides (CO and CO_{2}) and nitrogen oxides (NOx).

Toxic ash should be cleaned with water rather than blown away.

==== Forest research ====
The fire destroyed 80 hectares devoted to forest research, including research into species and varieties adapted to climate change and resistance to biological threats.

=== Economic consequences ===
Thirteen thousand businesses had to cease operations because of the evacuations. The government introduced provisions for partial unemployment, while insurers extended deadlines for filing claims.

Insurers are expected to pay hundreds of millions of euros in compensation in Gironde and the Landes.

The tourism sector was heavily affected during the peak season. Following authorities' calls not to travel to Gironde at the height of the fire, many tourists cancelled their trips, including to sites not directly affected by the fire. In early August, the government, tourism professionals and public figures called on tourists to return "out of solidarity".

== Reactions ==
In the media, the scientific community called for more than simply demanding additional firefighting resources or replanting the same species after the disaster. It called for recommendations from specialists in biodiversity, urban sprawl, land artificialisation, land-use zoning and related fields to be taken into account and implemented. Concern was also raised about the small number of municipalities equipped with fire defence plans for classified facilities for environmental protection (ICPE) and the short-termism of political and economic circles.

According to ecologist Philippe Grandcolas, "the diversity of landscapes must be restored". In his view, "what is punitive is failing to make decisions based on scientific knowledge and ultimately suffering serious consequences".

A controversy arose over the failure to maintain production capacity for aerial firefighting aircraft, which the European Union needs in the face of the ageing Canadair fleet, as well as concerns over their maintenance and operational readiness. In 2024, Prime Minister Gabriel Attal, under President Emmanuel Macron, cancelled an order for two Canadairs intended for firefighting. This sparked controversy over the relationship between the scale of the Gironde fires and the insufficient resources available to fight them. The fires also revived interest in establishing a permanent air base for Civil Security at Mont-de-Marsan in the Landes, as had been promised after the 2022 megafire.

Candidates in the presidential election challenged the government over the Beauvau report on civil protection, which was still awaiting legislation.

Residents of Le Porge, which suffered heavily from the fire, claimed that they had been sacrificed as the fire spread from Saumos towards Lège-Cap-Ferret, and called for compensation. The departmental director of the Gironde Fire and Rescue Service (SDIS 33) criticized what he called an "unfair trial", stating that the movement of "doctors and fuel trucks" "towards Lacanau and Lège" may have caused misunderstanding.

The Landes fire, caused by a burning vehicle, reignited debate over the presence of fire extinguishers in private vehicles.

== Lessons ==
Among the lessons that can be drawn from the fire are:

- numerous and widened firebreaks, as constructed urgently during the fire, to ensure sectorization of the forest massif;
- control of urbanization, with greater distances between pine trees and buildings;
- appropriate brush clearing around buildings and infrastructure;
- lower tree density to adapt to available water resources;
- monoculture creates problems with pests such as the pine wood nematode.

The benefits of species diversity are debated. Although maritime pine is a species well adapted to this environment and supplies the paper industry, a mixed forest of pine and suitable broadleaf species would be more beneficial in terms of cooling, soil quality and fire resistance.

== See also ==
- 1949 Landes forest fire
