= Wildfires in France =

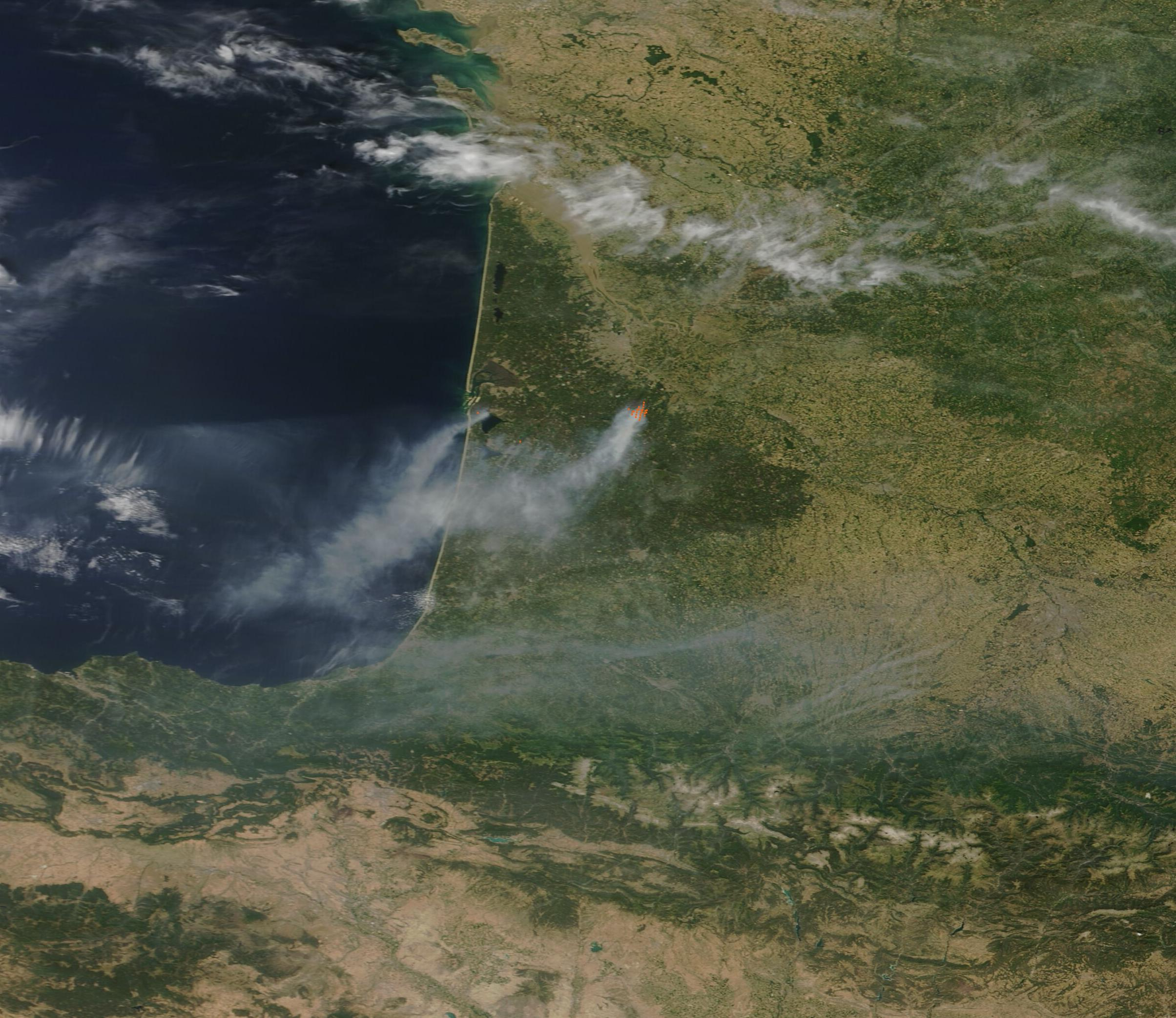
Satellite image of the 2022 Gironde wildfires.

Wildfires in France are a recurring phenomenon, particularly in southwestern and southeastern France. The number of wildfires and the extent of burned areas have decreased since the end of the 20th century, owing to effective fire-prevention and firefighting techniques. However, climate change is increasing, and is expected to continue increasing, the conditions conducive to wildfire ignition and their severity throughout the country.

== Causes ==
=== Causes of wildfires ===
The majority of wildfires in France whose cause is known are of human origin, either accidental or deliberate.

The distribution of known wildfire causes in France between 1996 and 2006, according to data from the Prométhée database, was as follows:

- 39%: arson or malicious acts (including pyromania and land-use conflicts);
- 23%: recreational activities (fireworks, barbecues, camping stoves, cigarette butts discarded by walkers or from vehicles);
- 21%: forestry or agricultural work;
- 9%: accidental causes (waste disposal, power lines, vehicle fires, etc.);
- 8%: natural causes (lightning).

Since 2006, the distribution of known wildfire causes (representing approximately half of all fires) has been as follows, according to data from the Base de données des incendies de forêt (BDIFF).

Share of wildfire causes in France, according to data from the Base de données des incendies de forêt (BDIFF), among fires whose origin is known. View chart definition.

=== Effects of climate change ===
==== Observed effects ====
Globally, the Working Group I contribution to the IPCC Sixth Assessment Report, published from 2021 to 2023, states with medium confidence that

weather conditions that favour wildfires have become more likely in southern Europe, northern Eurasia, the United States and Australia

over the past century.

In France, an 18% increase in the Forest Weather Index (FWI), which measures wildfire risk, was observed between the periods 1961–1980 and 1989–2008. Burned areas nevertheless decreased over the same period as a result of improvements in prevention and firefighting techniques. According to Météo-France, between the periods 1961–1990 and 2016–2025, the area of France subject to conditions conducive to wildfire development increased by a factor of 2.5, reaching 55% of the territory.

==== Projected effects ====
The IPCC Sixth Assessment Report projects with high confidence that weather conditions favourable to wildfires will become more frequent in some regions of the world if warming continues. The IPCC Working Group II also projects an increase in burned areas and in the frequency of wildfires.

A 2023 report by the French National Research Institute for Agriculture, Food and Environment (INRAE) considers two emissions scenarios for the 21st century: RCP 4.5, corresponding to relative stabilization of greenhouse gas emissions (resulting in warming similar to that projected by France's Reference Trajectory for Climate Change (TRACC), i.e. +4 °C in France by 2100), and RCP 8.5, the IPCC's most pessimistic scenario, corresponding to continued growth in greenhouse gas emissions. Under the first scenario, the number of fires larger than 20 ha (49 acres) would increase by 80% by 2100 compared with 2000–2020, while under the second scenario it would triple by the same date. Under both scenarios, and as early as 2050, France's two main wildfire-risk regions, the southeast and southwest, would experience increases in the number of large fires (larger than 100 ha (247 acres)) and in the areas at risk; the wildfire season would lengthen and burned areas would increase.

A 2025 report by Météo-France, projecting climate conditions at the end of the 21st century in a France experiencing +4 °C warming under the TRACC, predicts a geographical and temporal expansion of wildfire risk. The wildfire season will lengthen, by up to two additional months in some regions, beginning earlier and ending later. Regions that were formerly unaffected or only lightly affected by wildfires, particularly northern France, will increasingly experience them. The average number of days per year with a FWI above 40 is projected to increase eightfold, from one to eight days.

== History ==
=== Burned areas ===
Estimates of the area burned annually in France according to two distinct datasets.
Warning: the two series cover different geographical areas and use different methodologies.
The data for the Mediterranean region are based on reports from field agencies and come from the BDIFF; they cover only the following departments: Alpes-de-Haute-Provence, Hautes-Alpes, Alpes-Maritimes, Ardèche, Aude, Bouches-du-Rhône, Corse-du-Sud, Haute-Corse, Drôme, Gard, Hérault, Lozère, Pyrénées-Orientales, Var, and Vaucluse. The data for metropolitan France as a whole are derived from satellite measurements and come from the European Forest Fire Information System (EFFIS) of Copernicus; only fires larger than 30 ha (74 acres) are included. View chart definition.

=== Notable wildfires ===
==== Nouvelle-Aquitaine ====
- On 19 August 1949, the Landes forest fire burned 52,000 ha (128,495 acres). It was the deadliest wildfire in French history, killing 82 people, including forestry officials responsible for fire prevention and firefighting who were supervising military personnel sent to assist;
- On 20 August 1976, the La Palmyre fire, at Les Mathes (Charente-Maritime), burned 1,000 ha (2,471 acres) of the La Palmyre forest.
- In July 2022, in Gironde.
- In July 2026, in Gironde.

==== Occitania ====
- In late August 2010, east of Pic Saint-Loup, between Saint-Mathieu-de-Tréviers and Castries (Hérault), hundreds of hectares burned, requiring firefighting resources from three departments. The fire was probably deliberately started, but the investigation was closed without further action;
- In July 2025, in the Narbonne metropolitan area (Aude);
- In August 2025, at Ribaute, Aude: the fire began on 5 August and had burned 16,000 ha (39,537 acres) by the following day. This exceeded the 15,000 ha (37,066 acres) burned nationwide in approximately 9,000 fire outbreaks since the beginning of the summer. A resident of Saint-Laurent-de-la-Cabrerisse died after the ceiling of her house collapsed; she had refused to evacuate.

==== Provence-Alpes-Côte d'Azur ====
According to historical chronicles and archival records, although major wildfires were formerly less frequent than today, forests in the region have always burned. Dry areas are particularly susceptible; the examples of the Maures Mountains and Esterel Massif are illustrative:

- In 1271, an inadequately supervised grass fire spread into the forest and burned all the buildings of the Chartreuse de la Verne;
- In the 16th century, the Maures forest was burned during fighting between the armies of Charles V and Francis I;
- From 4 to 9 August 1854, 4,000 ha (9,884 acres);
- From 1 to 5 September 1877, 10,000 ha (24,711 acres);
- From 20 to 29 July 1918, 10,000 ha (24,711 acres) from Saint-Raphaël to Mandelieu, with two deaths;
- From 26 to 30 July 1921, 10,000 ha (24,711 acres);
- On 19 August 1923, eight deaths;
- On 15 August 1927, 10,000 ha (24,711 acres);
- On 7 July 1943, 13,000 ha (32,124 acres);
- On 3 October 1970, a fire devastated the forest of Auribeau-sur-Siagne, killing the wife and four children of Martin Gray;

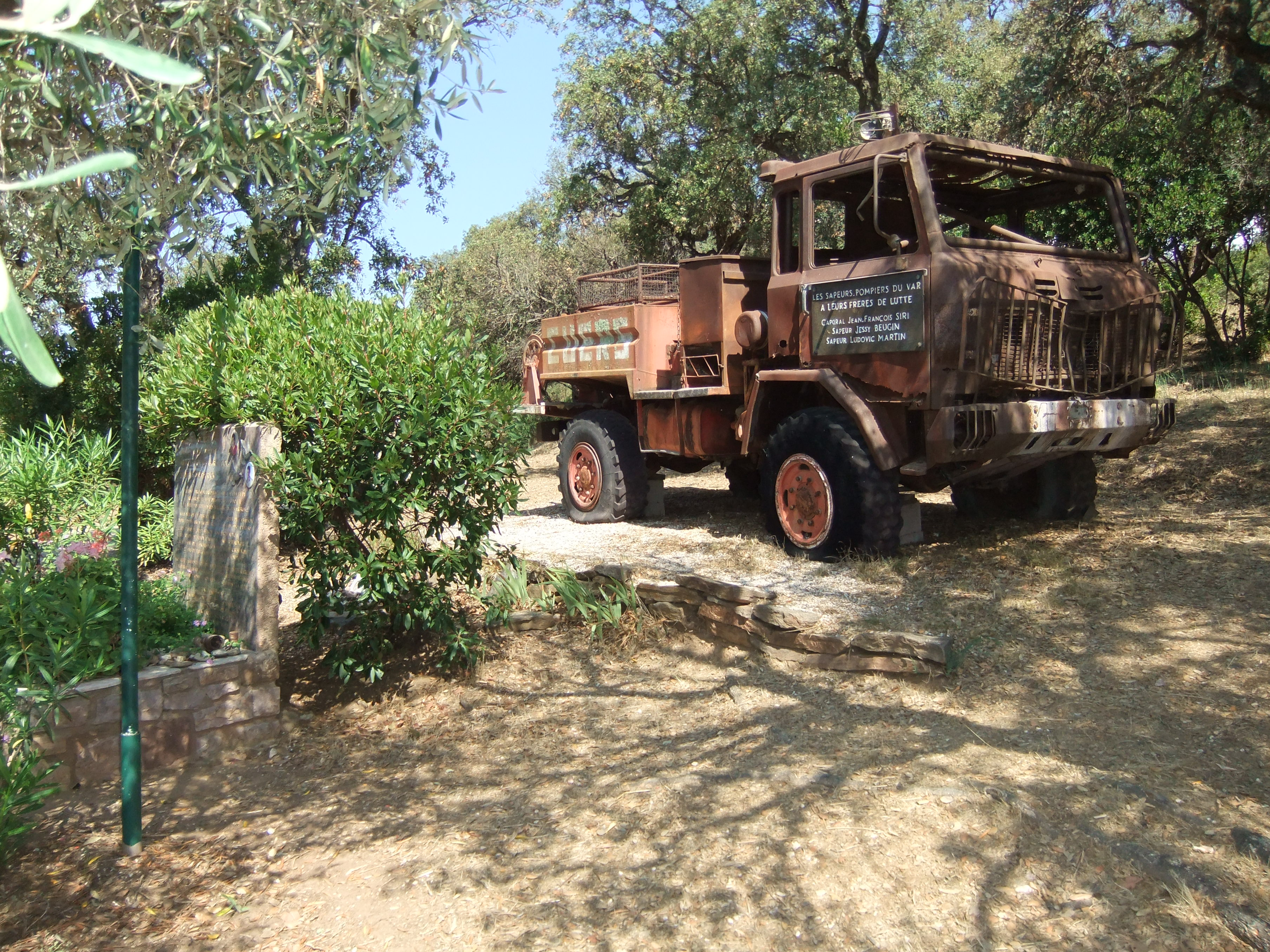
Memorial to firefighters killed in the 1990 Cabasson fire (Bormes-les-Mimosas, Var).

- In the summer of 1990, 10,000 ha (24,711 acres) were destroyed at Collobrières;
- In the summer of 2003, there were 387 fire outbreaks in the Var department. Seven of them destroyed 18,437 ha (45,559 acres) out of 21,000 ha (51,892 acres) burned in total. Major fires advanced at speeds of 4, 5, or even 6 km/h (4 mph), with flames 20 m (66 ft) high. Fire could jump distances of 400 to 500 m (1,640 ft), or more. Nevertheless, 5,000 ha (12,355 acres) of this ecosystem, in the municipalities of Les Mayons, Gonfaron, Le Cannet-des-Maures, La Garde-Freinet and Vidauban, had been classified as a Natural Area of Ecological, Faunal and Floristic Interest (ZNIEFF), and is home to the Hermann's tortoise;
- In April 2004, 600 ha (1,483 acres) burned in the Var near Brignoles;
- In August 2021, in the Var; see 2021 France wildfires;
- On 8 July 2025, at Les Pennes-Mirabeau and in the 16th arrondissement of Marseille, 750 ha (1,853 acres) were destroyed, with the fire threatening heavily urbanized areas.

==== Île-de-France ====
- 2026 Fontainebleau forest fire

== Prevention and firefighting ==
=== Prevention ===
90% of wildfires are caused by human activity, and 50% are caused by carelessness. France's wildfire prevention and forest-fire defence measures reduced the area destroyed by 80% between 1978 and 2017. Firefighting and prevention measures involve 35,000 people across the country at various stages.

The National Forests Office (ONF) identifies four main missions for forestry personnel: prevention (mobile patrols, access tracks to forest areas and brush clearance), intervention (assistance to firefighters), securing sites, and supporting ecological restoration.

=== Firefighting ===
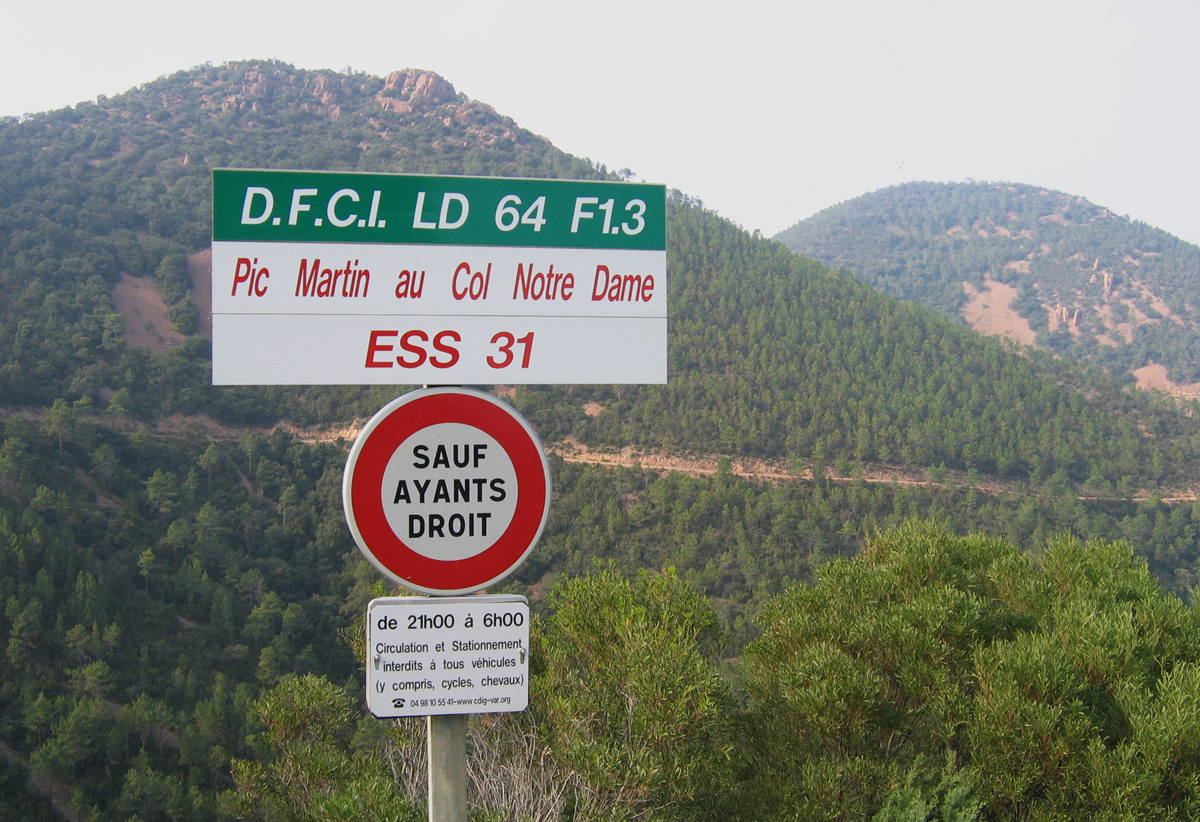
DFCI coordinates in the Esterel Massif.

The term Défense de la forêt contre les incendies (DFCI, "forest fire defence") is used in France. The term "DFCI coordinates" is used to locate forest areas, while "DFCI tracks" refer to roads providing access to those areas.

During the summer, 300 personnel are assigned to wildfire prevention and firefighting. Their preventive work includes reducing combustible vegetation, maintaining access tracks for emergency services, and creating breaks in vegetation cover to reduce the spread of fires.

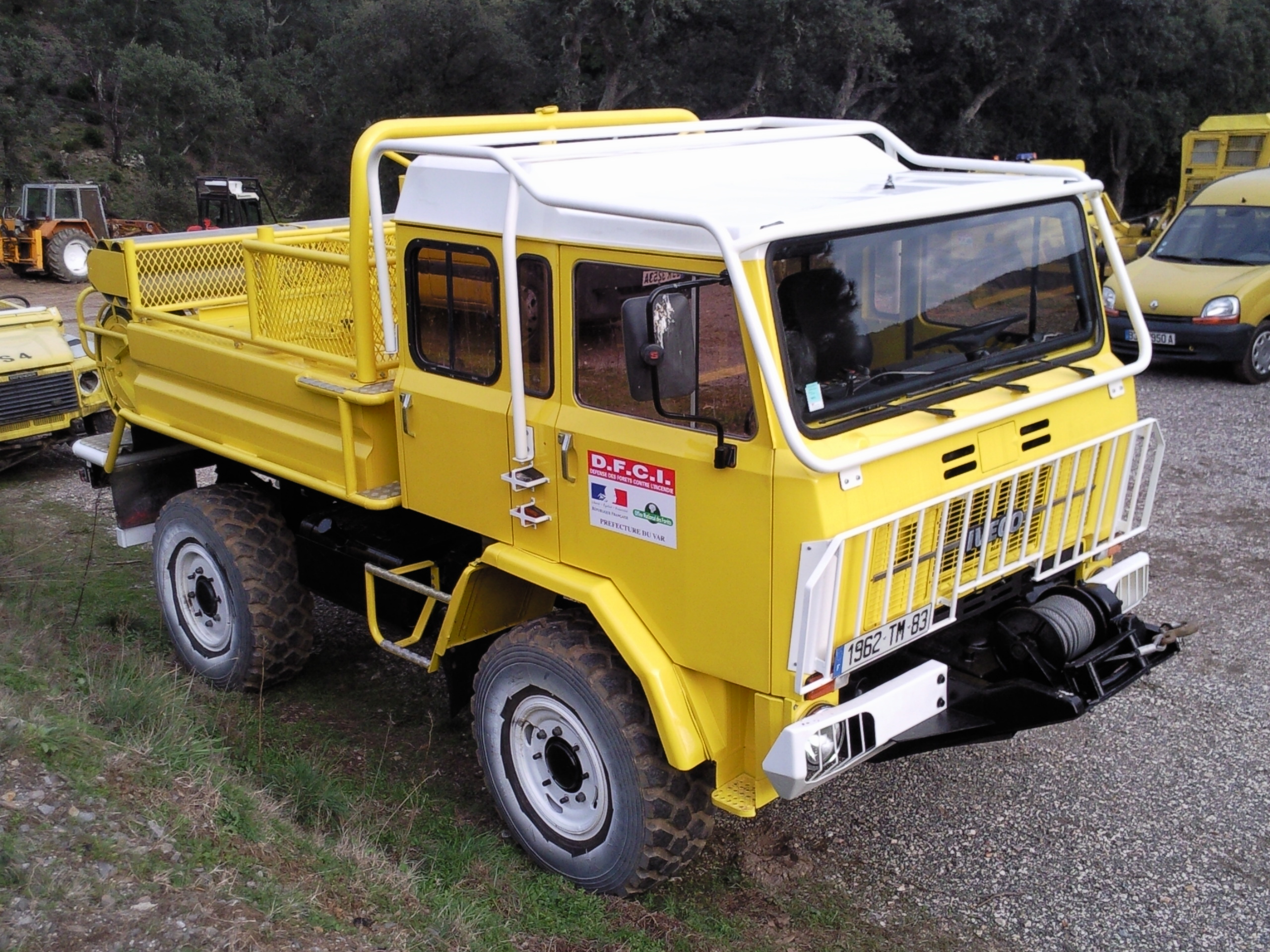
IVECO 2,000-litre medium wildfire water tanker operated by the Mediterranean Forest Protection Prevention Auxiliaries, National Forests Office of Var, 2011.

In addition to firefighters, the French state employs forestry workers specializing in DFCI (including forestry workers repatriated from North Africa and Mediterranean forest protection auxiliaries), supervised by non-commissioned officers of the National Forests Office (ONF). They use yellow water-carrying vehicles, command and enforcement vehicles, lookout towers at elevated locations and specialized teams.

Forestry personnel maintain and develop forest-fire defence infrastructure. In addition to assessing vegetation dryness to prevent fire outbreaks, forestry personnel conduct patrols and may intervene when fires start. They also help enforce brush clearance requirements.

The ONF provides various services in different departments at the request of the state's forestry services within the departmental directorates for agriculture and forests (DDAF): a Forest Support Unit for Major Fires (computerized real-time fire mapping and forecasting assistance), teams for guiding resources and reconnaissance, a multidisciplinary investigation team for determining the origin of forest fires (a joint forestry and gendarmerie investigative team), tactical-fire teams, and others. Local authorities also employ territorial forestry firefighters, known as forestiers-sapeurs (using yellow vehicles), originally trained by the ONF but subsequently transferred to departmental authorities following the state's withdrawal from the service, as well as volunteers organized into Municipal Forest Fire Committees (CCFF, using orange vehicles).

Ground vehicles specifically used for fighting wildfires include:

- wildland fire tankers (CCF): all-terrain vehicles (4×4) equipped with a self-protection system for situations in which the vehicle is surrounded by flames, including a pressurized cab and a water-spraying system;
- high-capacity water tankers (CCGC): heavy articulated trucks used as water reserves to supply CCF vehicles.

Firefighters have a "retreat kit" allowing them a minimum level of protection if they become trapped outside their vehicle. It consists of a hood with a filter cartridge (similar to a gas mask)—wildfire operations are conducted without self-contained breathing apparatus—and a metallized poncho to protect against radiant heat.

During the summer, firefighting units in high-risk departments (forested departments of southern France), as well as the Marseille Naval Fire Battalion, are reinforced by firefighters from other departments, military personnel from the Civil Security Training and Response Units, and reserve naval firefighters.

- Wildfire Intervention Groups (GIFF) are columns of vehicles. In addition to CCF vehicles, GIFFs include logistical vehicles—usually two or three multipurpose vehicles (VTU) carrying replacement equipment, mechanical supplies, food and drink—and ideally a VSAV staffed by a firefighter-paramedic, potentially a medical radio vehicle (VRM) with a firefighter physician, and a mobile command post (PCM).

All firefighting aircraft operating in southern France are placed under the authority of the COZ (Zone Operational Centre), which was initially established at Valabre in Bouches-du-Rhône in 1979 and has been located at Marseille Saint-Loup since 2016. The centre monitors and assesses risks and deploys and coordinates aerial and ground forces. It operates under the authority of the prefect of the southern defence and security zone (Provence-Alpes-Côte d'Azur, Occitania, and Corsica).

== Legislation ==
In France, the 1669 Ordinance on Waters and Forests specified that

all persons are forbidden from bringing or lighting fire, in any season whatsoever, in forests, heathlands and heaths, under penalty of corporal punishment and discretionary fines, in addition to compensation for any damage the fire may have caused

. In 1706, the Chamber of Waters and Forests of the Parlement of Provence decreed: "All herdsmen are forbidden from setting fire to woods, under penalty of corporal punishment." The General Council of the Var and the prefects continued the fight against forest fires, assisted by the Penal Code (Article 458) and the Forest Code (1827), whose Article 148 maintained the prohibition established by the 1669 ordinance and extended it to a zone 200 m (656 ft) wide from the edge of the forest.
