= 1949 Landes forest fire =

1949 wildfire in France

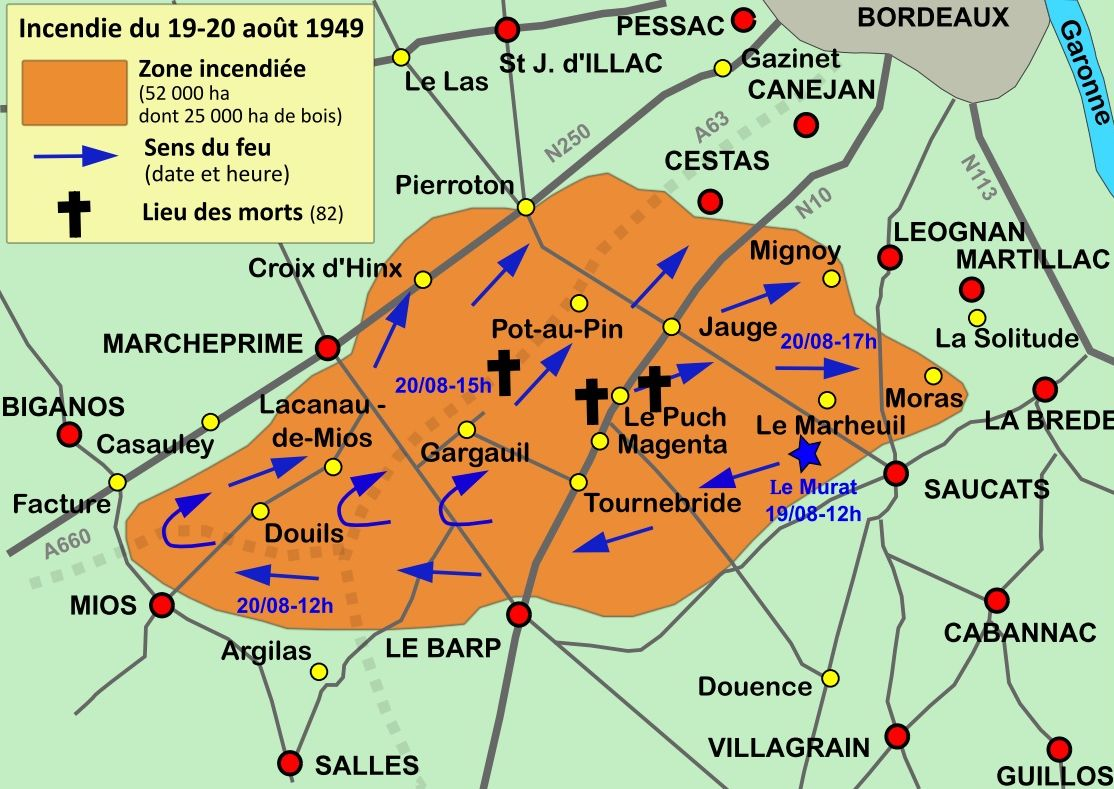
- Map of the progression of the fire. Orange marks area burnt; blue arrow the directional of travel; and the crosses locations of deaths
- Date: August 19–25, 1949
- Location: France: Landes forest

Statistics
- Status: Extinguished
- Burned area: 50,000 hectares (500 km^{2})

Impacts
- Deaths: 82

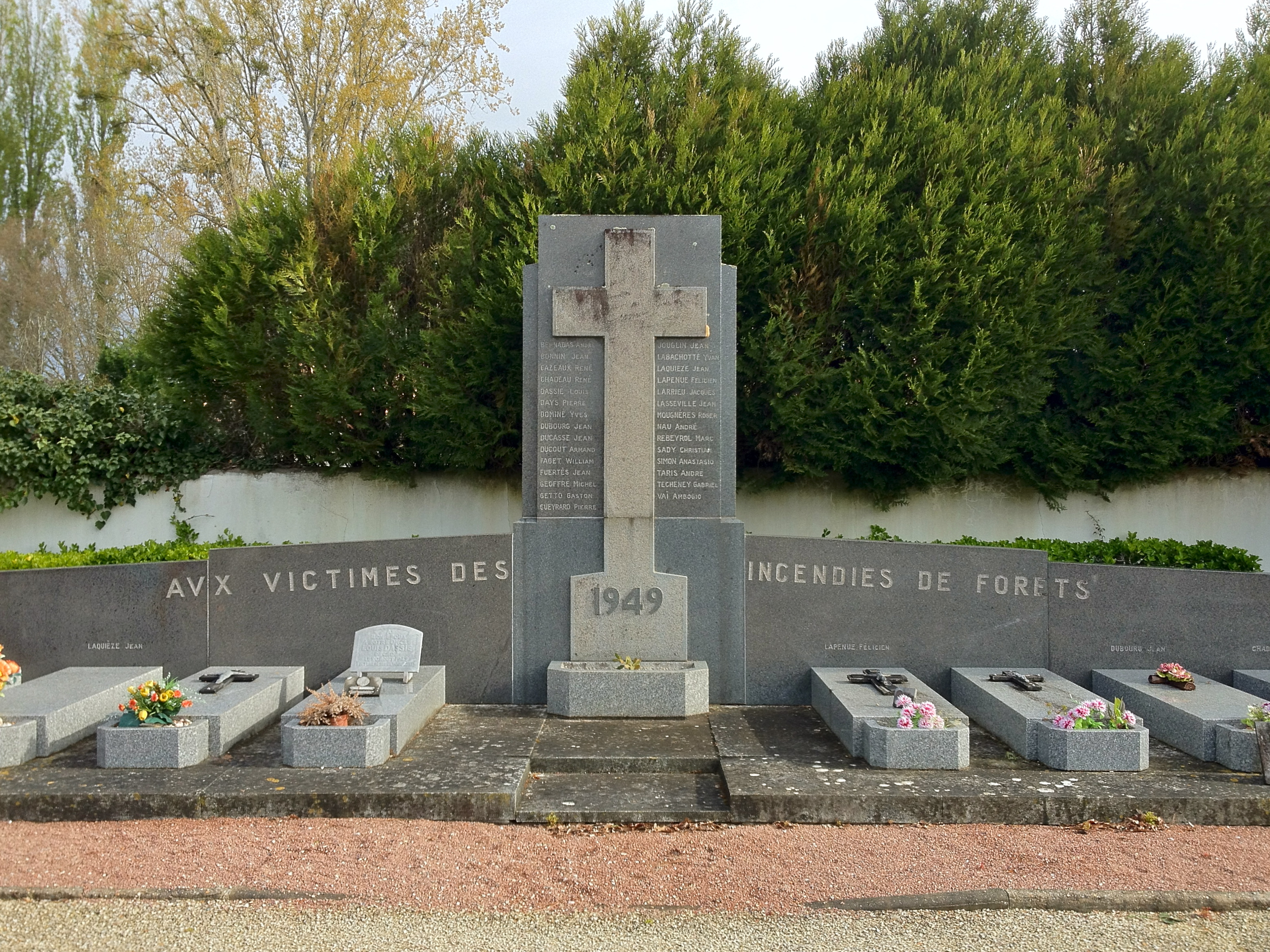
Monument to victims of the 1949 fires, at Canéjan

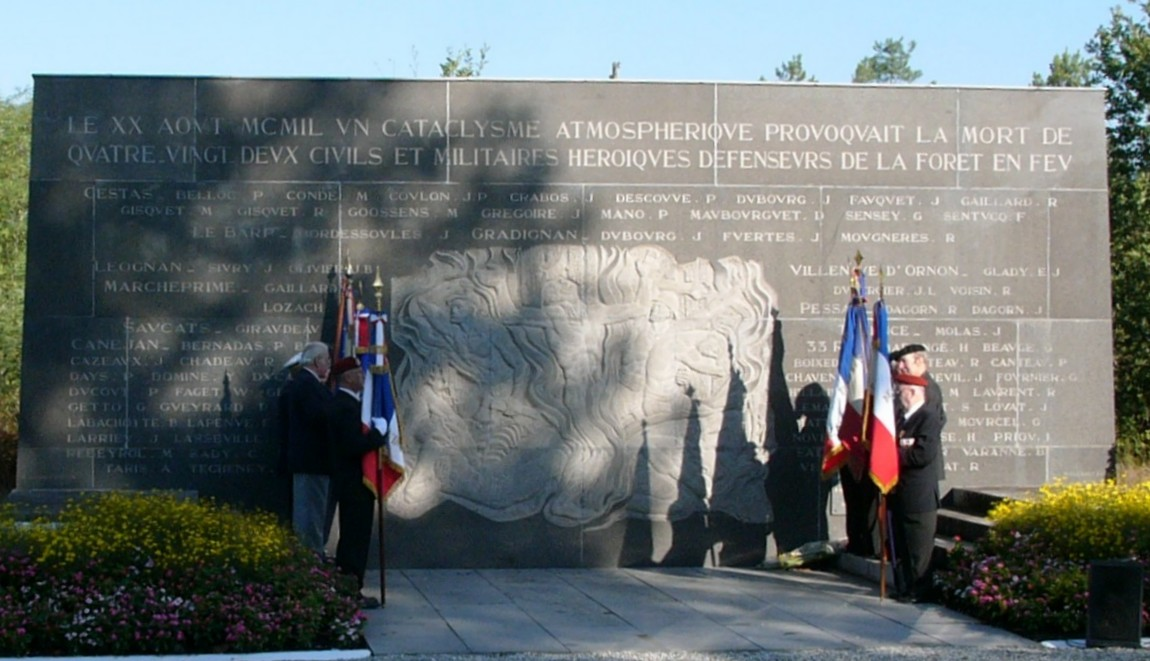
Monument to victims of the 1949 fires, at Cestas

A major wildfire occurred from 19 August 1949 to 25 August 1949 in the Landes forest in France. 50,000 hectares (500 km^{2}) of forest land were burnt - and 82 people killed. It was considered the most deadly forest fire in Europe until the 2007 wildfires and the 2018 wildfires occurred in Greece, which killed 84 and 99 people, respectively. Since both events in Greece can be distinguished as multiple fire events, the Landes fire still ranks as the deadliest wildfire in Europe since record-keeping began. The municipalities of Cestas, Saucats, Marcheprime and Mios in the Gironde department were devastated by the forest fire. The very high death toll from the fire shocked the country – and marked the starting point for the construction of the “Défense de la forêt contre les incendies” System ("Defending Forest against Wildfires" System).

== Bibliography and further reading ==
- Joan Deville, L'Incendie meurtrier dans la forêt des Landes en août 1949, Les Éd. des Pompiers de France, 15 mai 2009, 160 p. (ISBN 978-2916079202) (in French)

== See also ==
- 2026 Landes forest wildfire
