= Canadian Forest Fire Weather Index System =

Weather-based wildfire danger rating system

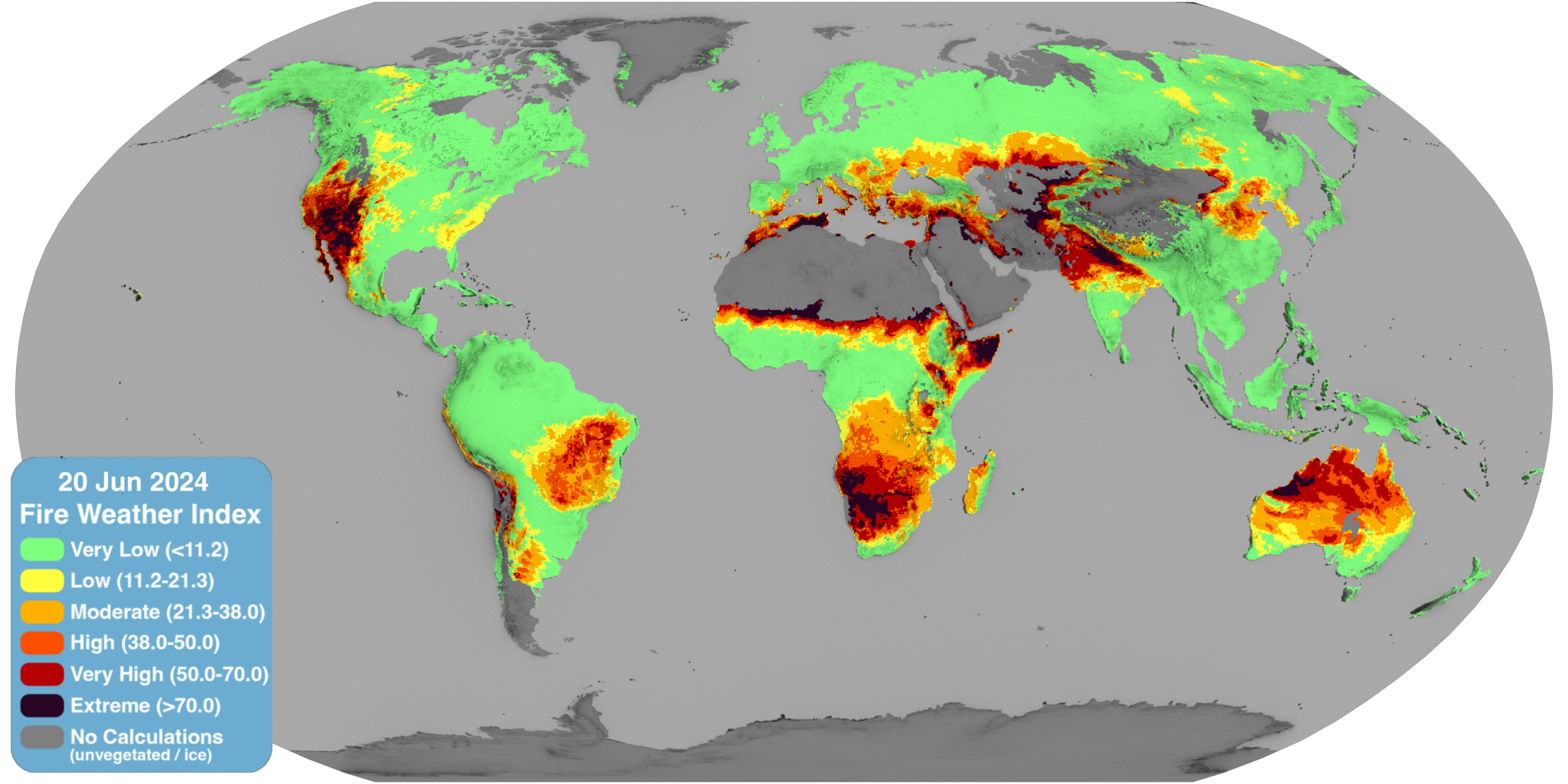
Daily Fire Weather Index forecast

The Canadian Forest Fire Weather Index System (FWI System) is a weather-based fire danger rating system developed by the Canadian Forest Service. It is a component of the Canadian Forest Fire Danger Rating System (CFFDRS) and is used to assess the effects of weather on fuel moisture and potential fire behaviour. The system uses air temperature, relative humidity, wind speed and precipitation to calculate three fuel moisture codes—the Fine Fuel Moisture Code (FFMC), Duff Moisture Code (DMC) and Drought Code (DC)—and three fire behaviour indices: the Initial Spread Index (ISI), Buildup Index (BUI) and Fire Weather Index (FWI). The FWI itself is a numerical rating of potential fire intensity and is used as an indicator of fire danger.

The FWI System was first issued in 1970 after several years of development by the Canadian Forestry Service. It is used by wildland fire agencies throughout Canada and is also used internationally.

== History and development ==
Canadian federal research into forest fire danger rating began in the 1920s. Early work used field ignition tests and fuel sampling to examine the relationship between fuel moisture and ignition. During the 1930s, fuel moisture and fire hazard rating tables were developed and later adapted for different regions of Canada.

The FWI System was first issued in 1970 after several years of development by researchers in the Canadian Forestry Service. Revised versions were issued in 1976 and 1984. The 1976 revision changed equations used for the Fine Fuel Moisture Code and Drought Code and altered the calculation of the Fire Weather Index under extreme drought. It also expressed the system in metric units. The 1984 revision made further refinements to the Fine Fuel Moisture Code. The system described by Van Wagner in 1987 remained largely unchanged for decades.

In 2025, the Canadian Forest Service Fire Danger Group published an updated formulation, known as FWI2025, as part of an update to the CFFDRS. FWI2025 keeps the existing components and adds hourly calculations and optional components for grassland fuels. The report distinguishes the two formulations as FWI1987 and FWI2025, while retaining FWI System as the general name.

== Description ==
How the components of the FWI System work together

In the FWI1987 formulation, the system is calculated from weather observations taken once each day at noon local standard time. The four weather inputs are air temperature, relative humidity, wind speed and precipitation accumulated over the previous 24 hours. The system first calculates three fuel moisture codes: the Fine Fuel Moisture Code (FFMC), Duff Moisture Code (DMC) and Drought Code (DC). These are numerical ratings that track changes in the moisture of different forest-floor fuel layers from day to day. Higher values indicate drier conditions.

The three moisture codes are used to calculate the fire behaviour indices. The FFMC is combined with wind speed to produce the Initial Spread Index (ISI), while the DMC and DC are combined to produce the Buildup Index (BUI). The ISI and BUI are then combined to produce the Fire Weather Index (FWI), a numerical rating of potential fire intensity.

The standard FWI System uses a generalized mature pine forest as its reference fuel type, allowing fire danger to be compared using a consistent fuel model rather than the vegetation at each location. Fuel-specific fire behaviour is treated separately in the Canadian Forest Fire Behaviour Prediction System (FBP System). For the DMC and DC, the month of the year is used to apply seasonal day-length adjustments.

Components and principal inputs of the FWI System
Component	Principal inputs
Fine Fuel Moisture Code (FFMC)	Previous FFMC, temperature, relative humidity, wind speed and rain
Duff Moisture Code (DMC)	Previous DMC, temperature, relative humidity, rain and month of the year
Drought Code (DC)	Previous DC, temperature, rain and month of the year
Initial Spread Index (ISI)	FFMC and wind speed
Buildup Index (BUI)	DMC and DC
Fire Weather Index (FWI)	ISI and BUI

Wang, Anderson and Suddaby (2015) published the complete equations and calculation procedures for FWI1987.

In FWI2025, the calculations are performed at hourly intervals using the same pine reference fuel type. FWI2025 also provides optional codes and indices for grassland fuels.

=== Individual components ===
Fine Fuel Moisture Code (FFMC) is a numerical rating of the moisture content of litter and other cured fine fuels. It responds to temperature, relative humidity, wind and rain, and indicates the relative ease of ignition and flammability of fine fuels.

Duff Moisture Code (DMC) is a numerical rating of the average moisture content of loosely compacted organic layers of moderate depth. It responds to temperature, relative humidity and rain, and provides an indication of fuel consumption in moderate duff layers and medium-sized woody material.

Drought Code (DC) is a numerical rating of the average moisture content of deep, compact organic layers. It responds to temperature and rain and indicates the effects of seasonal drought on forest fuels and the potential for smouldering in deep duff layers and large logs.

Initial Spread Index (ISI) is a numerical rating of the expected rate of fire spread. It combines wind speed with the FFMC without accounting for the quantity of fuel available for combustion.

Buildup Index (BUI) is a numerical rating of the total amount of fuel available for combustion. It combines the DMC and DC.

Fire Weather Index (FWI) combines the ISI and BUI to provide a numerical rating of potential fire intensity and a general indicator of fire danger.

== Interpretation ==
The numerical outputs of the FWI System are relative indicators of fire potential rather than direct measurements of fire behaviour. The Fire Weather Index itself is a unitless rating of potential fire intensity, with higher values indicating greater fire danger. The system provides a standardized assessment of weather and fuel-moisture conditions, but its operational interpretation also depends on local fuels and seasonal conditions.

Fire management agencies commonly convert FWI System values into descriptive fire-danger classes such as low, moderate, high, very high and extreme. In Canada, these classifications developed independently among jurisdictions, and the numerical thresholds separating the classes can differ between agencies. Similar regional calibration is used outside Canada. A study in the United Kingdom found that 99th-percentile FWI values varied by more than an order of magnitude across the country.

The 2025 FWI System report proposes a set of physically based national fire-danger classes, but the thresholds are not intended to be definitive and may be modified by agencies for local operational needs. Predictions for specific fuel types, including ignition probability, spread rate and fire intensity, are made with the Canadian Forest Fire Behaviour Prediction System.

== Usage ==
The FWI System is used operationally throughout Canada and has been adopted or applied internationally, including through the European Forest Fire Information System (EFFIS) and the Global Wildfire Information System (GWIS).

=== Canada ===
The FWI System is a principal component of the Canadian Forest Fire Danger Rating System used by wildland fire management agencies across Canada. Provincial and territorial wildland fire agencies calculate FWI System values at weather stations within their jurisdictions and use the resulting codes and indices in fire management decisions. The Canadian Wildland Fire Information System (CWFIS) combines these and other fire information to provide national fire-danger maps and reports.

=== United States ===
The National Fire Danger Rating System (NFDRS) is the national fire-danger rating system of the United States. Alaska's interagency fire community uses the Canadian system in lieu of NFDRS for local fire-danger assessment. Alaska adopted the CFFDRS in 1992 because its indices more closely represented fluctuations in the state's fire season than comparable NFDRS indices. Current Alaska interagency guidance states that the CFFDRS is used because Alaska's boreal forest and tundra fuels are more precisely represented by the Canadian system. Some national products based on NFDRS are still used in Alaska.

=== Europe ===
EFFIS uses the Canadian FWI System as a common measure of meteorological fire danger across Europe and neighbouring countries. This provides a consistent basis for comparing fire danger across national boundaries. The system was initially used by EFFIS primarily for the Mediterranean region before coverage was extended to the rest of Europe and parts of North Africa and the Middle East. Studies of European applications have found that locally meaningful danger classes may require regional calibration rather than applying the same FWI thresholds in all climates.

=== France ===
In France, the FWI is known as the indice forêt météo (IFM). Météo-France uses the IFM to characterize weather conditions that favour the intensification and spread of forest fires. Fire danger has historically been greatest in Mediterranean France, where summer drought, low humidity and strong winds favour wildfire development.

=== Croatia ===
The Canadian FWI System has been used for fire-danger assessment along the Croatian Adriatic coast since the 1980s. The system was calibrated for the Croatian Adriatic and divided into five local fire-danger classes. Along the Adriatic coast, summer drought and strong winds can produce severe fire-weather conditions. During the 2017 Split wildfire, the FWI reached its highest value of the year while strong northeasterly bura winds and local topography contributed to rapid fire spread.

=== New Caledonia ===
Météo-France in New Caledonia uses the Canadian FWI method as the basis for its operational forest-fire danger assessment. Danger levels are not assigned directly from fixed FWI values. Instead, the FWI at each weather station is compared with percentile thresholds specific to that station.

=== Australia ===
In Australia, the Canadian FWI is used mainly for research and comparison with Australian fire-danger systems. It is not the country's operational fire-danger rating system. Australian researchers have compared the FWI with the McArthur Forest Fire Danger Index (FFDI), including their sensitivity to temperature, humidity, wind and rainfall. The CSIRO National Bushfire Intelligence Capability also includes the Canadian FWI among the fire-weather indices used for research and analysis. Australia's operational fire-danger ratings are instead produced through the Australian Fire Danger Rating System, which uses fuel-specific fire-behaviour models.

== See also ==
- Haines Index (US, no longer used)
- Hot-Dry-Windy Index
