= Le Barp =

- Commune
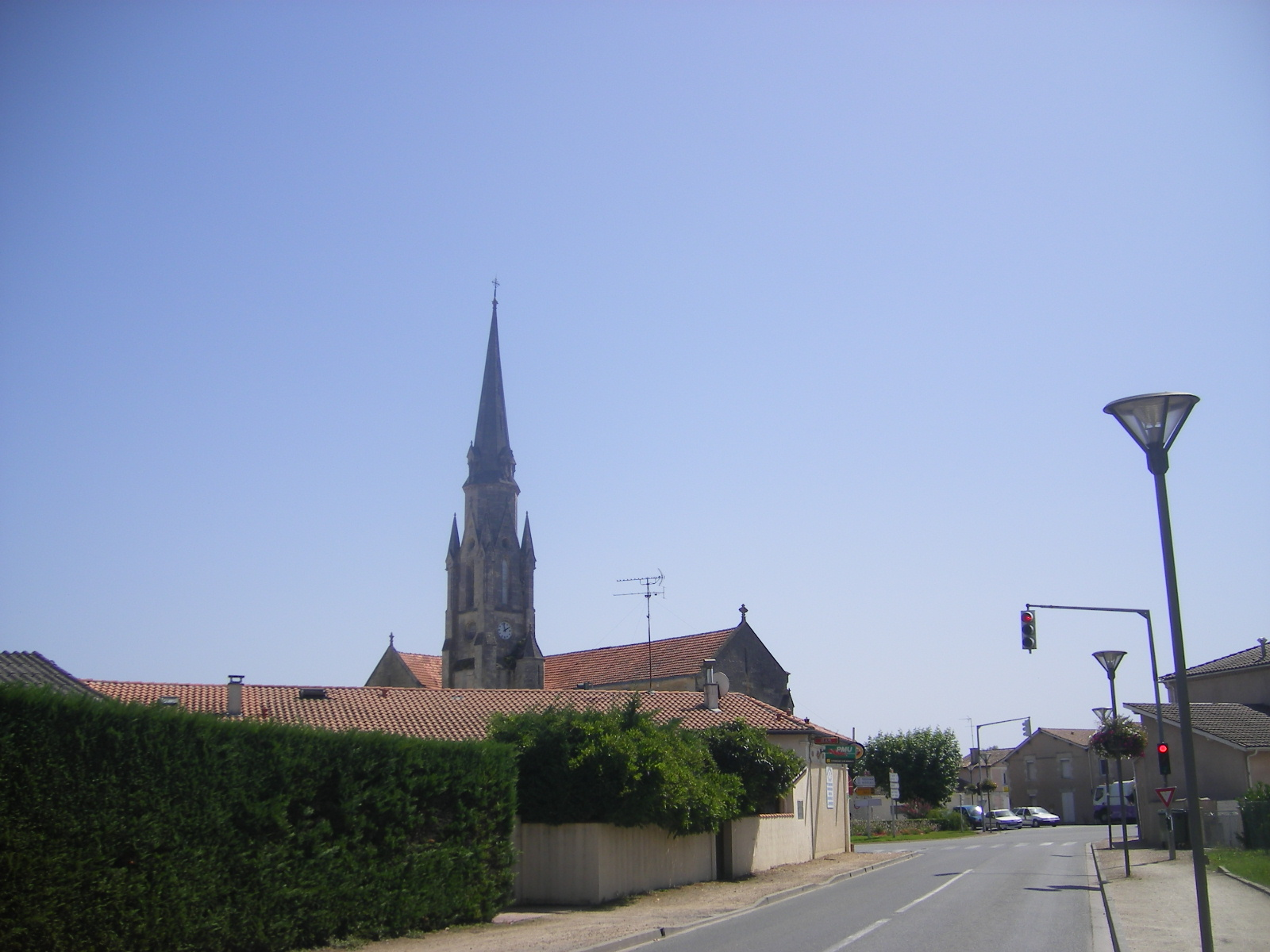
- The church and surroundings in Le Barp

- Coat of arms
- Location of Le Barp
- Location within France Location within Nouvelle-Aquitaine
- Coordinates: 44°36′25″N 0°46′00″W
- Country: France
- Region: Nouvelle-Aquitaine
- Department: Gironde
- Arrondissement: Arcachon
- Canton: Les Landes des Graves
- Intercommunality: Val de l'Eyre

Government
  - Mayor (2020–2026): Blandine Sarrazin
- Area^{1}: 107.32 km^{2} (41.44 sq mi)
- Elevation: 72 m (236 ft)
- Highest elevation: 84 m (276 ft)
- Lowest elevation: 40 m (130 ft)
- Population (2023): 5,806
  - Density: 54.10/km^{2} (140.1/sq mi)
- Time zone: UTC+01:00 (CET)
  - Summer (DST): UTC+02:00 (CEST)
- INSEE/Postal code: 33029 /33114
- ^{1} French Land Register data, which excludes lakes, ponds, glaciers > 1 km^{2} (0.386 sq mi or 247 acres) and river estuaries.

Le Barp (French pronunciation: [lə baʁp]; Gascon: Lo Barp) is a municipality in the Southwest of France. It is located in the Department of Gironde in the Region of Nouvelle-Aquitaine. It is also located in the Landes Forest, on the territory of the Landes de Gascogne Regional Nature Park. Le Barp has a special geographic situation because it is located between Bordeaux and Arcachon Bay which are two highly tourist destinations. The inhabitants are called the Barpais in French.

== Population ==
Historical population
Year	Pop.	±% p.a.
1968	958	—
1975	1,303	+4.49%
1982	2,238	+8.03%
1990	2,584	+1.81%
1999	3,242	+2.55%
2007	4,374	+3.81%
2012	4,908	+2.33%
2017	5,506	+2.33%
2023	5,806	+0.89%
Source: INSEE

== Geography ==
Le Barp is located on the territory of the Landes de Gascogne Regional Nature Park, near the Val de l'Eyre. The adjacent municipalities of Le Barp are Cestas in the North, Saucats in the North East, Saint-Magne in the South East, Belin-Béliet In the South, Salles in the South West and Mios in the West. Le Barp is also located on the D1010 national road and close to the A63 motorway.

== History ==
The town was founded around the hospital that already existed in the thirteenth century instead of the current church and which did not survive the abandonment of the pilgrimage. Le Barp is on the way from Tours to Santiago de Compostela and many pilgrims go through Le Barp every year. It is a part of its history. This former hospital was an important stop for pilgrims. To the Revolution, the Saint-Jacques parish formed the commune of Le Barp.

== Economy ==
=== Agriculture ===
Most of the primary activity is oriented towards the exploitation of the forest that covers a large part of the municipal territory. The company Planasa (Darbonne Pépinière) produces strawberries and small red fruits and also exports and markets plants. Le Barp is famous for its production of Sables des Landes asparagus and its cooking recipes.

=== Industry ===
The Aquitaine Scientific and Technical Design Centre (CESTA) of the French Alternative Energies and Atomic Energy Commission is located in the north of the municipal territory.

== Local culture and heritage ==
=== Places and monuments ===
The Saint-Jacques Church was completely rebuilt during the second part of the 19th century. It has a bell tower dating from the 18th century.

Le Barp, situated on the territory of the Landes de Gascogne Regional Park, participates in the Contemporary Art Forest Project (Forêt d'Art Contemporain in French). It hosts a contemporary work of art like several other neighbouring municipalities.

== See also ==
- Communes of the Gironde department
- Parc naturel régional des Landes de Gascogne
