= Canéjan =

- Commune
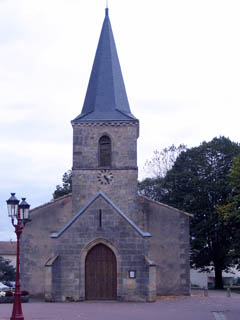
- The church in Canéjan

- Coat of arms
- Location of Canéjan
- Location within France Location within Nouvelle-Aquitaine
- Coordinates: 44°45′50″N 0°39′13″W
- Country: France
- Region: Nouvelle-Aquitaine
- Department: Gironde
- Arrondissement: Bordeaux
- Canton: Pessac-1

Government
  - Mayor (2020–2026): Bernard Garrigou
- Area^{1}: 12 km^{2} (4.6 sq mi)
- Elevation: 40 m (130 ft)
- Highest elevation: 56 m (184 ft)
- Lowest elevation: 23 m (75 ft)
- Population (2023): 5,756
  - Density: 480/km^{2} (1,200/sq mi)
- Time zone: UTC+01:00 (CET)
  - Summer (DST): UTC+02:00 (CEST)
- INSEE/Postal code: 33090 /33610
- ^{1} French Land Register data, which excludes lakes, ponds, glaciers > 1 km^{2} (0.386 sq mi or 247 acres) and river estuaries.

Canéjan (French pronunciation: [kaneʒɑ̃]; Gascon: Canejan, before 1987: Canéjean) is a commune in the Gironde department in Nouvelle-Aquitaine in southwestern France.

== Geography ==
Canéjan is located 11.4 km southwest of Bordeaux. It is on the A63 autoroute, as well as the Route nationale 10.

The commune borders Cestas (southwest), Gradignan (northeast), Pessac (north), and Léognan (southeast).

== History ==
Gallo-Romans' relics has been discovered which attest human presence around the end of the 1st century and the beginning of the 2nd century.

On 20 August 1949, 29 people from Canéjan died at Le Puch (Cestas), while fighting a fire which killed 82 and burned 28,000 hectares (69,000 acres). In September 1949, General Charles de Gaulle came in Canéjan to visit firefighters' graves.

== Name ==
There used to be two different ways of spelling the name of the city, Canéjean or Canéjan, in July 1987 it has been decided to keep only one: Canéjan.

== Population ==
Historical population

Year	Pop.	±% p.a.
1793	312	—
1800	275	−1.79%
1806	274	−0.06%
1821	355	+1.74%
1831	324	−0.91%
1836	334	+0.61%
1841	417	+4.54%
1846	403	−0.68%
1851	362	−2.12%
1856	416	+2.82%
1861	416	+0.00%
1866	477	+2.77%
1872	413	−2.37%
1876	475	+3.56%
1881	465	−0.42%
1886	581	+4.55%
1891	506	−2.73%
1896	484	−0.89%
1901	511	+1.09%

Year	Pop.	±% p.a.
1906	478	−1.33%
1911	470	−0.34%
1921	534	+1.28%
1926	449	−3.41%
1931	453	+0.18%
1936	408	−2.07%
1946	382	−0.66%
1954	462	+2.41%
1962	510	+1.24%
1968	594	+2.57%
1975	3,257	+27.52%
1982	3,380	+0.53%
1990	4,976	+4.95%
1999	5,114	+0.30%
2007	5,086	−0.07%
2012	5,187	+0.39%
2017	5,539	+1.32%
2023	5,756	+0.64%

Source: EHESS and INSEE (1968-2023)

== See also ==
- Communes of the Gironde department
