= Beauvau =

Beauvau may refer to:

== Places ==
- Beauvau, Maine-et-Loire, France
- Place Beauvau, site of the Ministry of the Interior in Paris

== Names ==
- House of Beauvau, a historic noble family from Anjou
  - Marc de Beauvau, Prince of Craon (1679–1754), viceroy, administrator of the Grand Duchy of Tuscany
  - Marie Françoise Catherine de Beauvau-Craon (1711–1787), marquise de Boufflers, mistress of King Stanislas I
  - Charles Juste de Beauvau, Prince of Craon (1720–1793), marshal of France
