= 2026 European drought =

2026 European drought.

In 2026, Europe experienced drought-like conditions amid heatwaves. Climate change is a key factor in the creation of the drought, making it 80 times more likely in western Europe and 40 times in eastern Europe. Many countries have restricted water use, wildfires spread across Europe and agriculture was hit hard. The drought reduced the flow of water in the rivers, cutting the generation of hydropower and reducing the movement of ships, which can increase food and energy prices. Dr Mariam Zachariah, at Imperial College London and also part of the study team, said: “What’s most alarming is that these conditions are occurring at 1.4C of warming. If global emissions push temperatures up to 2.8C as predicted, these intense evaporative conditions could double in likelihood. Without rapid, aggressive emissions cuts, Europe is heading for a future where these scorching, dry summers happen time and time again.”

== Austria ==
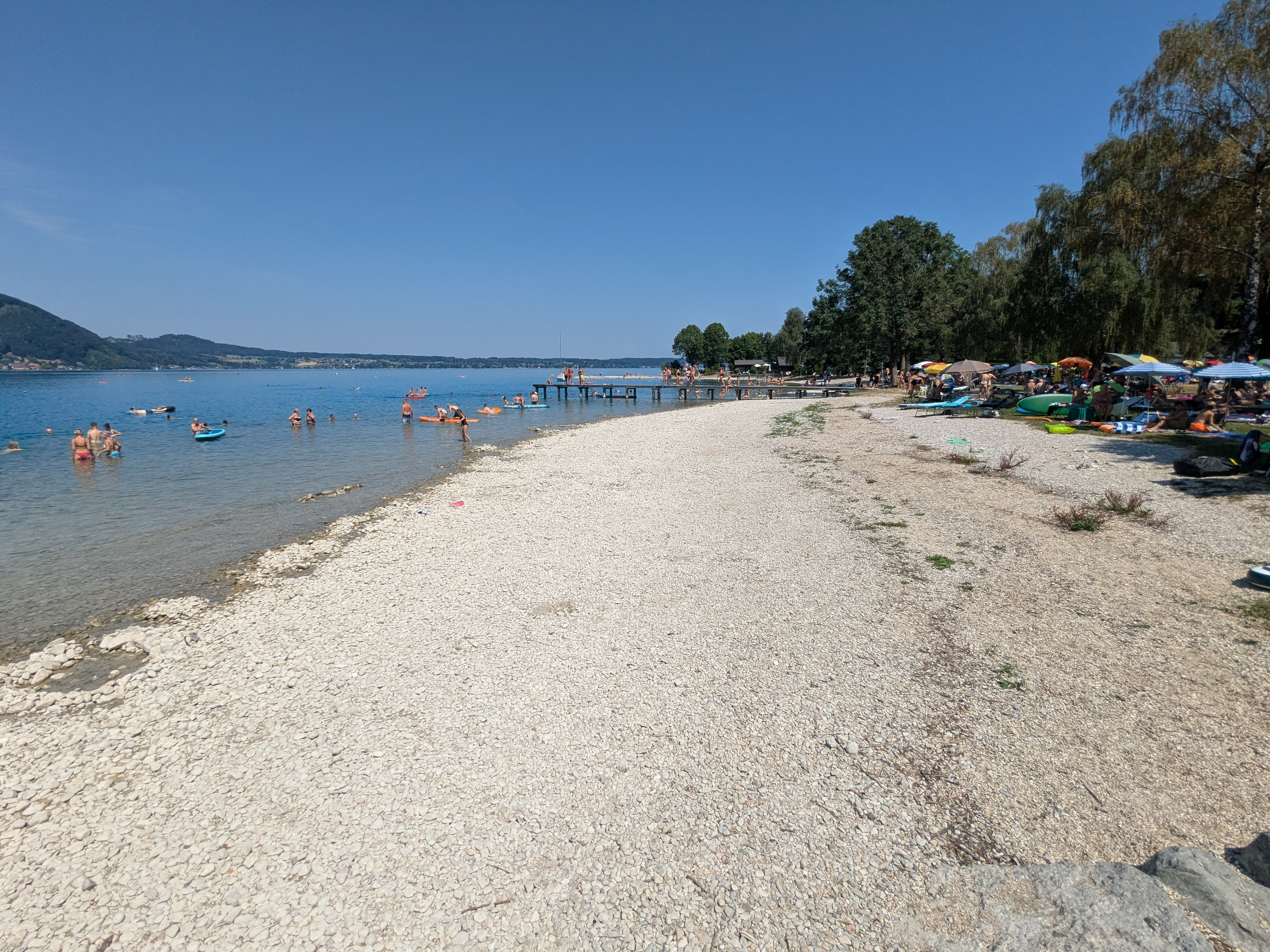
Low water at the Attersee

By late July, large parts of Austria were affected by drought as the country experienced one of the worst lacks of precipitation in decades, with the amount of precipitation since December 2025 being reported as approximately 30 percent lower than the levels needed to prevent drought.

On 11 August, it was reported that the climate data since 1961, available to GeoSphere Austria, indicated the longest and most consistent yearly deficits in precipitation for eastern Austria in the last 65 years.

At the same time, water levels in the Danube measured at a station in Hainburg an der Donau were reported to be the lowest since the station began operations in 1976, with the lowest values for both July and August being significantly lower than those recorded both during the 2003 European heatwave and on multiple occasions during autumn and winter, when water levels in the Danube in Austria typically reach their yearly lows.

By 29 August, 49 GeoSphere Austria stations had recorded the lowest summer precipitation levels since they began operations. The dry conditions were particularly severe in western and northeastern Austria, with some locations reporting precipitation levels that were approximately 50 percent lower than the levels needed to prevent drought, whilst the nationwide precipitation levels were around 31 percent below the 1991–2020 average.

== Belgium ==
Belgium has been affected by drought. Wallonia brought in drought-related restrictions to resolve water shortages. Flanders has suffered water scarcity. Authorities in the Brussels-Capital Region extended a code yellow drought alert. On 14 August, a bush fire started in the High Fens, burning at least 900 hectares.

== Croatia ==
On 7 August, it was reported that, due to a combination of long-standing heat and a lack of precipitation, the waters in the Drava and the Danube in eastern Croatia had fallen to the lowest levels for years. The drought in the region had significantly reduced harvests.

== France ==
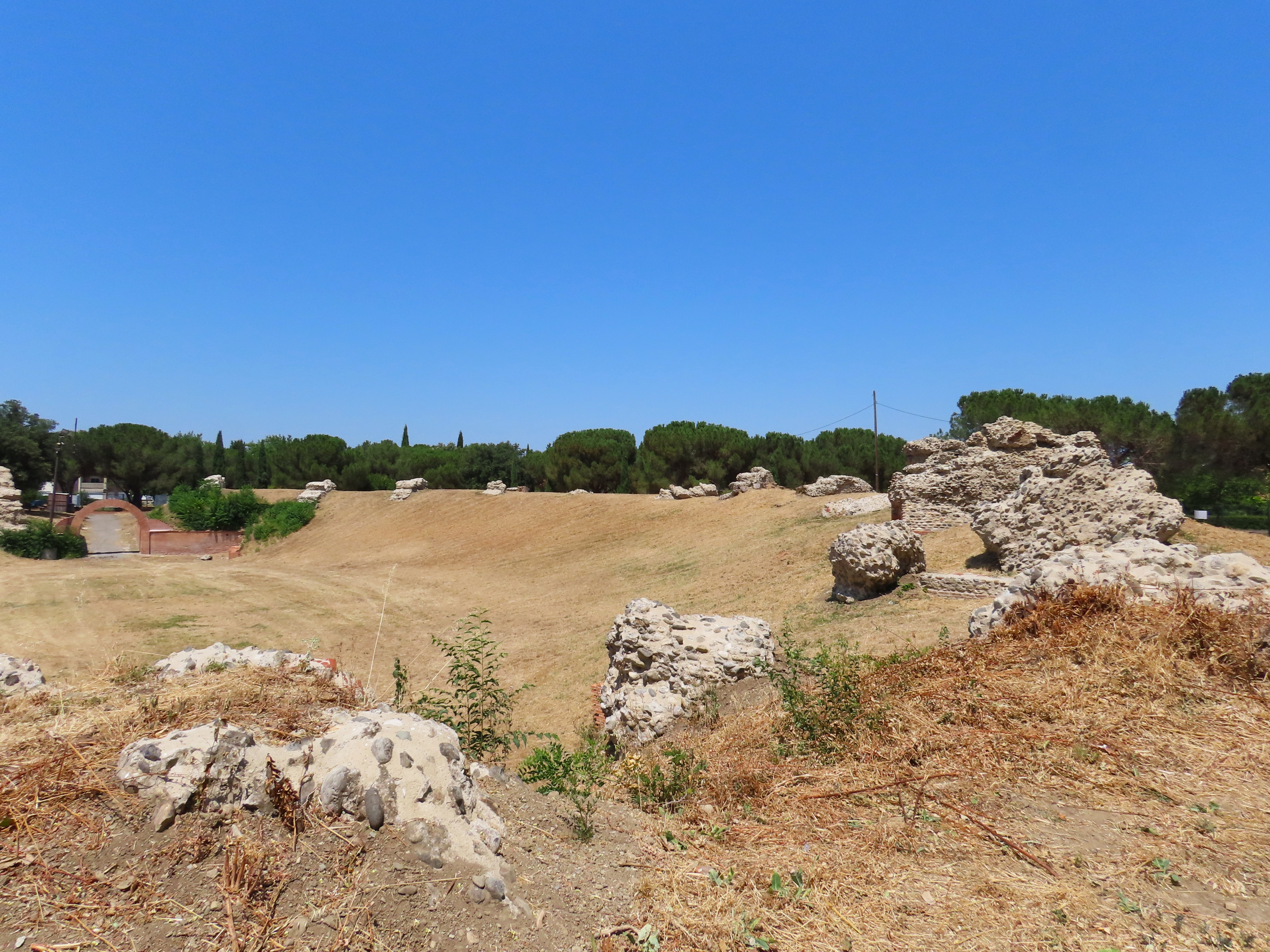
Dry grass at the Roman amphitheatre in Toulouse

Droughts have affected France. Water restrictions were implemented in 99 of France's 101 departments as of 15 July. Crop yields are expected to plummet. The grape harvest has been affected. Climate change in France has been reportedly a major cause.

== Germany ==
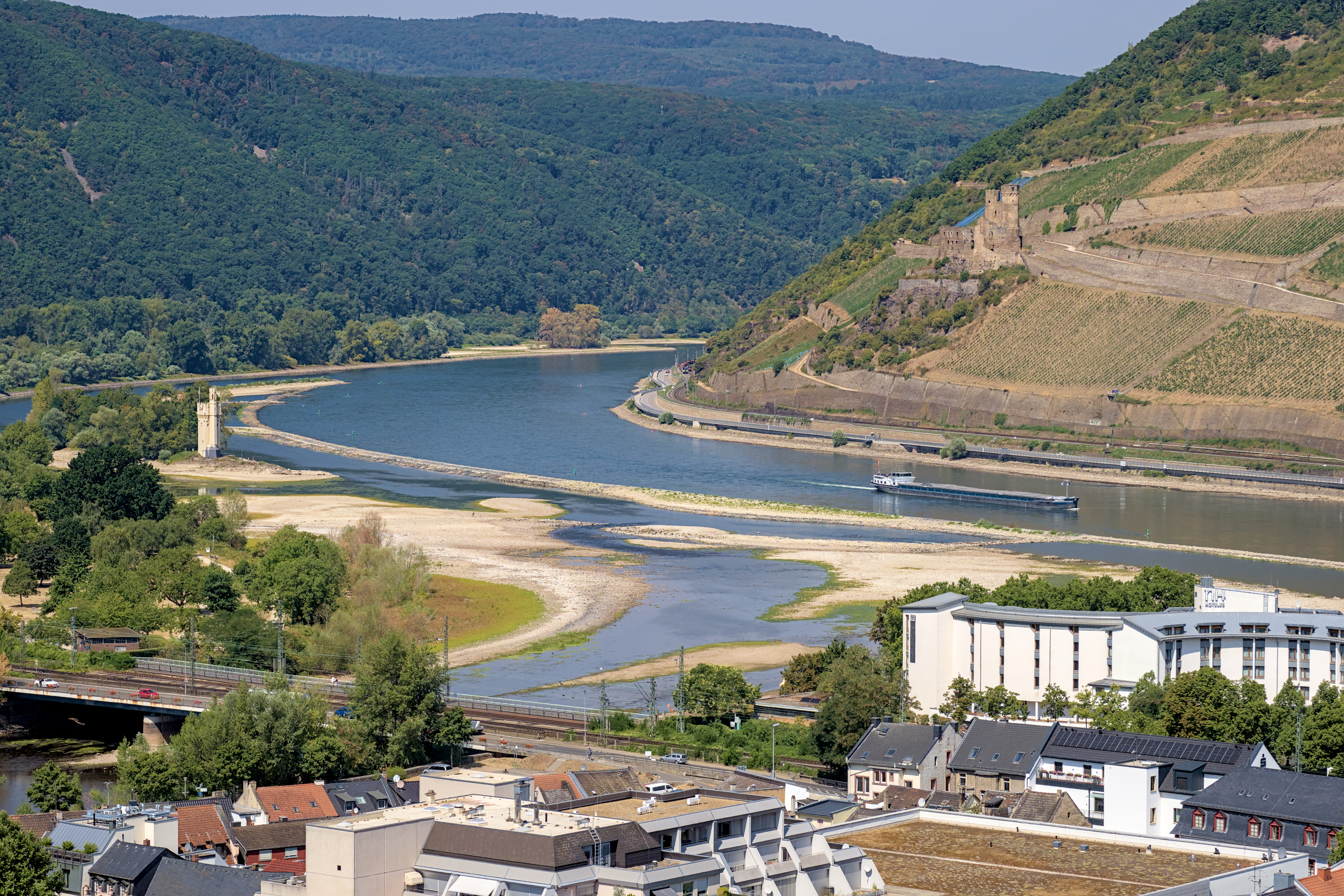
Low water levels in August 2026 near Bingen, at the confluence of the Rhine and Nahe rivers.

The Rhine near Koblenz; by September yachts were lying largely on dry land.

Germany has been affected by droughts.

Record low water levels at the Rhine have disrupted supply chains.

== Hungary ==
Copernicus Sentinel-2 images show a stretch of the Danube river about 45 km north of the Hungarian capital Budapest, comparing the river in August 2025 to the drought conditions of August 2026.

Hungary's only nuclear power plant nearly had to be completely shut down for the first time, due to record low water levels of the River Danube. Shipwrecks have been exposed. War relics including a German military motorcycle were exposed in Budapest.

== Italy ==
The Po river has reportedly dried up. Seawater has drained into the river.

== Netherlands ==
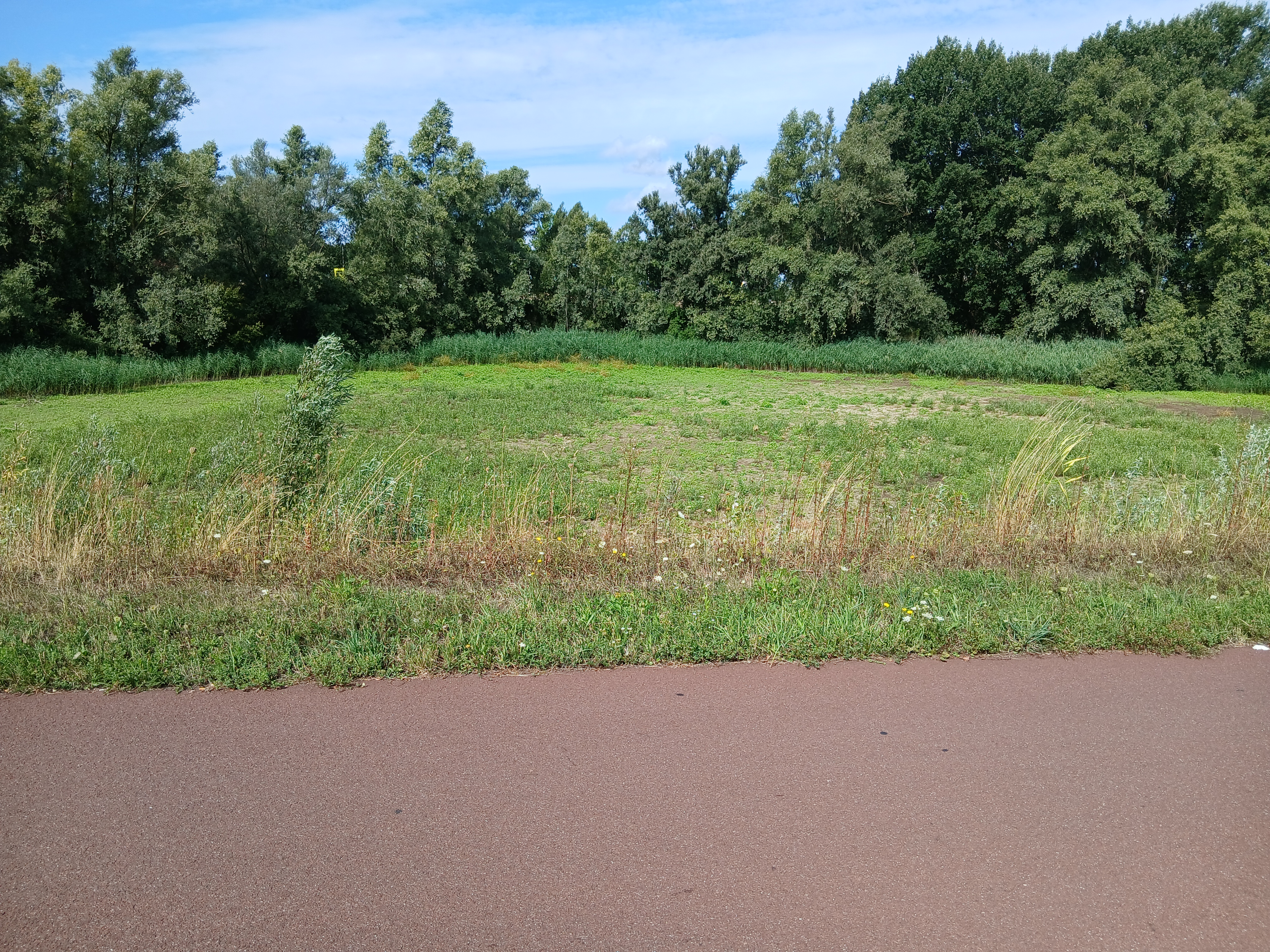
Effects of lowest recorded water levels of the Rhine

Water shortages have been reported in the Netherlands. Ships and houseboats have been grounded.

The Rhine had its lowest recorded water levels at Arnhem.

== Serbia ==
A sunken German warship from World War II was exposed, due to low water levels in the Danube River in Prahovo.

== Slovakia ==
In Slovakia, drought revealed unexploded ordinance in the Danube in the form of a 700 kg (1,500 lb) naval mine from the Royal Air Force in World War II. The mine was recovered and safely detonated.

== Slovenia ==
On 10 July, it was reported that most of Slovenia had been affected by drought due to a nationwide lack of precipitation over the preceding 30 days, with the drought having a particularly negative influence on the quality of agricultural land. The drought continued into August, leading to the implementation of restrictions on the use of water for non-essential purposes in some parts of the country.

== Switzerland ==
The drought has affected Switzerland despite some rain. This was 50 years after another major drought. Neuchâtel and Schwyz have enacted emergency measures for farmers.

In Switzerland, August was the driest since measurements began in 1864. Also September 2026 has been very dry, writes MeteoSwiss. In 2012, the 'European Drought Observatory' has begun taking measurements.

== United Kingdom ==
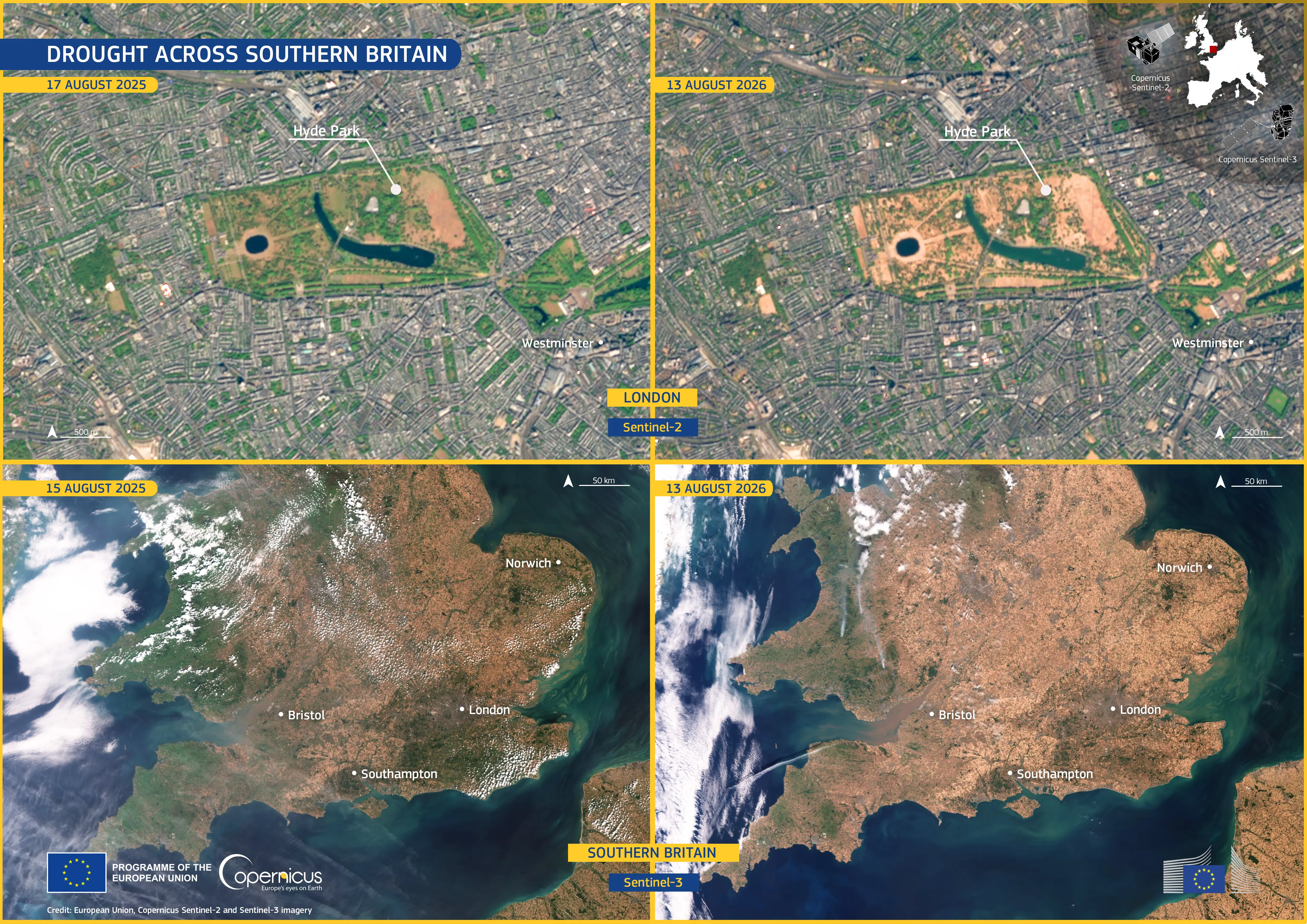
August drought in Hyde Park in central London and Southern England.

In June 2026, the Environment Agency (EA) convened its National Drought Group to discuss the dry spring and recent heatwave. It assessed that the dry weather put England at risk of a ‘flash drought’ similar to the 2022 drought in the United Kingdom, with reducing river flows, low rainfall and increased water use during hot weather.

On 29 July 2026, the EA declared that most of England was in a drought, for the third time in five years. Southern England saw its driest month ever recorded since 1836.

It was the driest July on record for nearly 200 years. As of August 2026, the entirety of Wales was in drought. There have been record periods without rain. There have been hosepipe bans. Drought status was extended to four more regions in August amid another potential heatwave.

At the start of September, the EA announced "provisionally" that the summer of 2026 was the hottest on record for the United Kingdom. As of 17 September 2026 the EA has assessed ten of its operational areas in England were experiencing drought, while other areas are experiencing a period of ‘prolonged dry weather’. Extreme heat has contributed to a decrease in the volume of water stored, with depleted groundwater storage and below average reservoir storage.

== See also ==
- Drought in the United Kingdom
- Climate change in Europe
- 1540 European drought
- 2022 heat waves
- 2022 European heat waves
- 2022 European drought
- 2023 European heat waves
- 2020–2023 North American drought
- 2023 European drought
