= Sainte-Hélène, Gironde =

Sainte-Hélène
- Commune
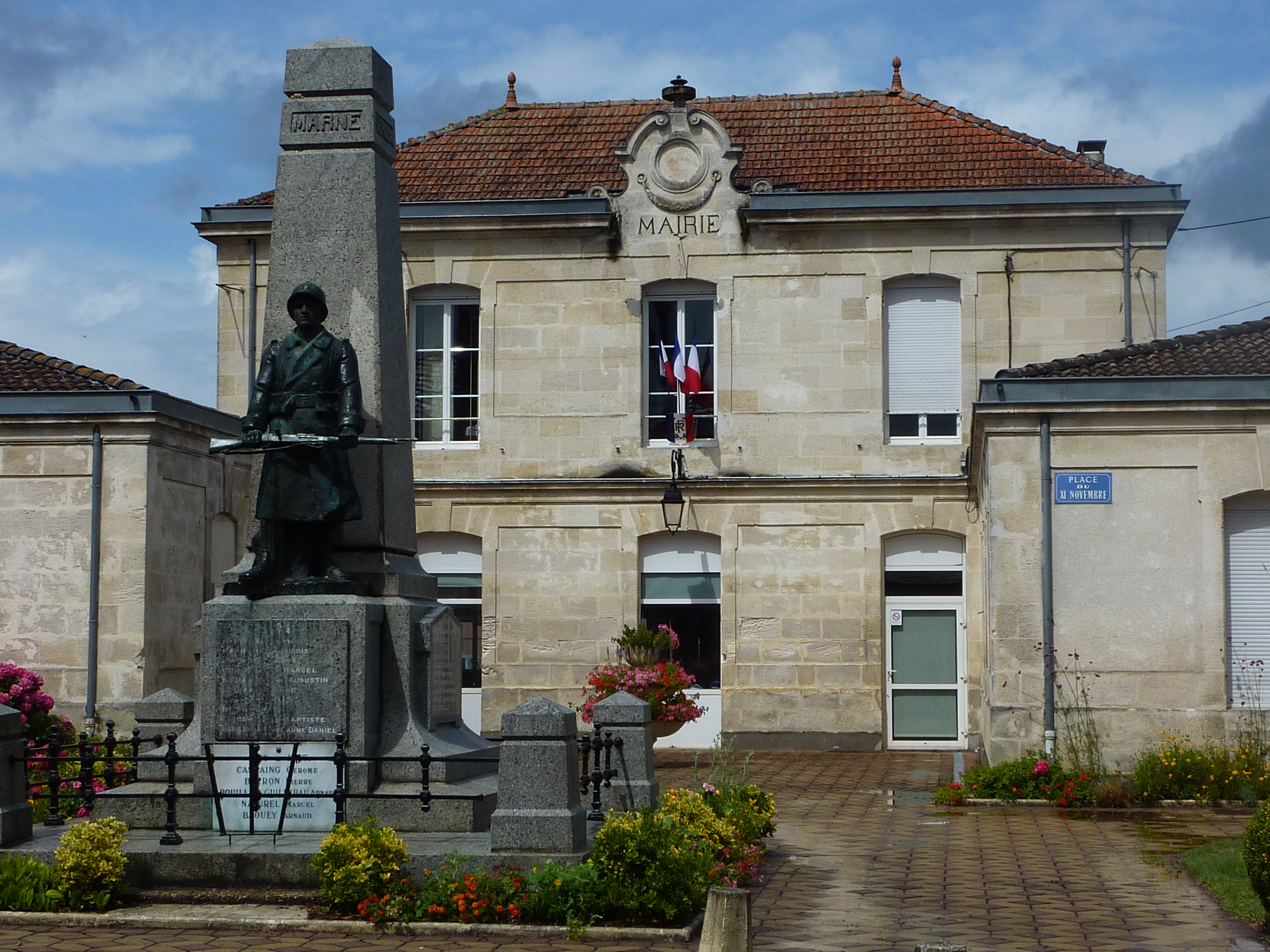
- Town hall
- Location of Sainte-Hélène
- Location within France Location within Nouvelle-Aquitaine
- Coordinates: 44°57′59″N 0°52′59″W
- Country: France
- Region: Nouvelle-Aquitaine
- Department: Gironde
- Arrondissement: Lesparre-Médoc
- Canton: Le Sud-Médoc
- Intercommunality: Médullienne

Government
  - Mayor (2020–2026): Lionel Montillaud
- Area^{1}: 127.87 km^{2} (49.37 sq mi)
- Elevation: 43 m (141 ft)
- Highest elevation: 47 m (154 ft)
- Lowest elevation: 28 m (92 ft)
- Population (2023): 3,091
  - Density: 24.17/km^{2} (62.61/sq mi)
- Time zone: UTC+01:00 (CET)
  - Summer (DST): UTC+02:00 (CEST)
- INSEE/Postal code: 33417 /33480
- ^{1} French Land Register data, which excludes lakes, ponds, glaciers > 1 km^{2} (0.386 sq mi or 247 acres) and river estuaries.

Sainte-Hélène (French pronunciation: [sɛ̃t elɛn]; Gascon: Senta Elena) is a commune in the Gironde department in Nouvelle-Aquitaine in southwestern France.

== Population ==
Historical population
Year	Pop.	±% p.a.
1968	1,052	—
1975	1,107	+0.73%
1982	1,436	+3.79%
1990	1,608	+1.42%
1999	1,776	+1.11%
2007	2,414	+3.91%
2012	2,643	+1.83%
2017	2,797	+1.14%
2023	3,091	+1.68%
Source: INSEE

== See also ==
- Communes of the Gironde department
