= Saumos =

- Commune
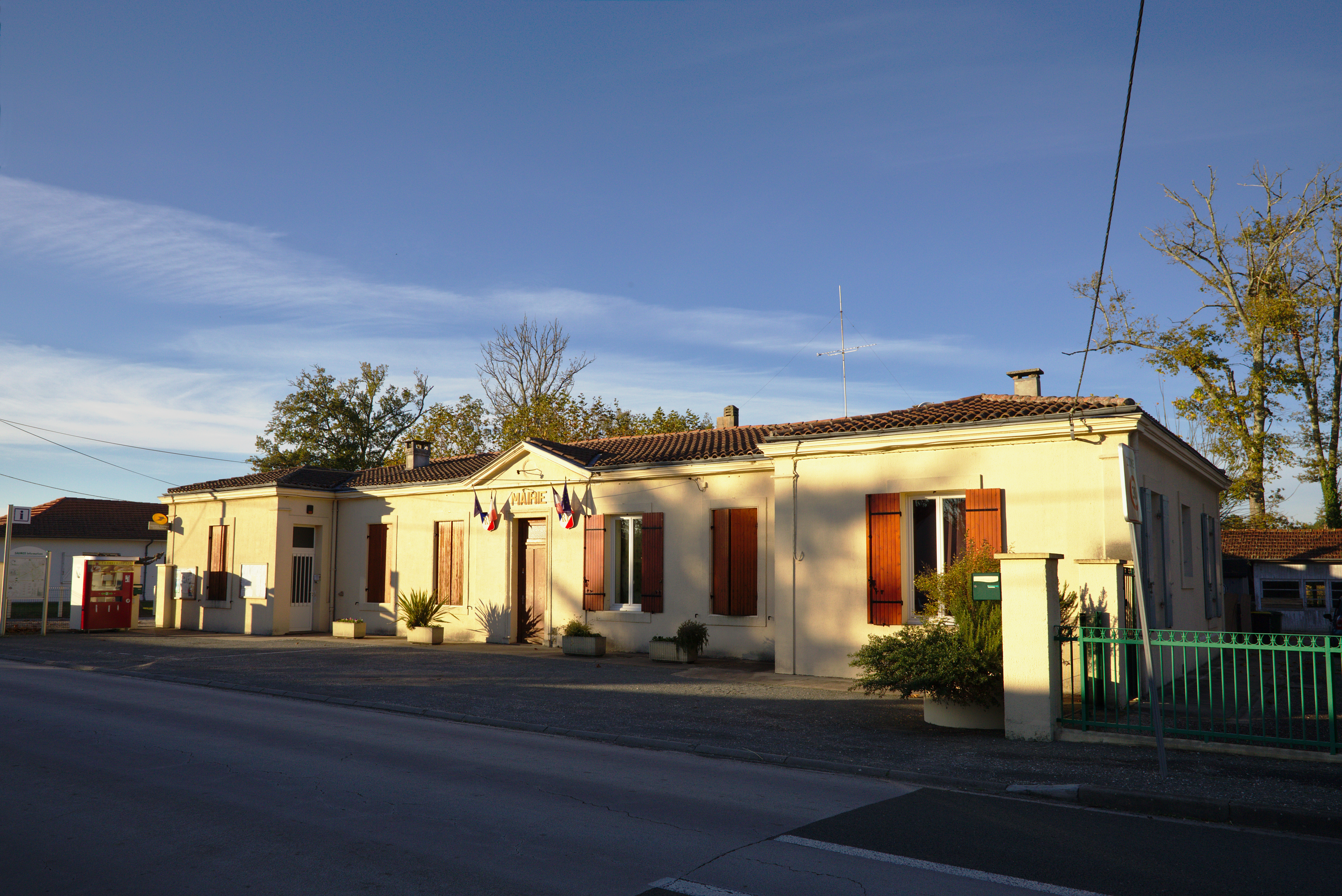
- The town hall in Saumos
- Location of Saumos
- Location within France Location within Nouvelle-Aquitaine
- Coordinates: 44°55′12″N 0°59′17″W
- Country: France
- Region: Nouvelle-Aquitaine
- Department: Gironde
- Arrondissement: Lesparre-Médoc
- Canton: Le Sud-Médoc
- Intercommunality: Médullienne

Government
  - Mayor (2020–2026): Didier Chautard
- Area^{1}: 57.65 km^{2} (22.26 sq mi)
- Elevation: 32 m (105 ft)
- Highest elevation: 41 m (135 ft)
- Lowest elevation: 21 m (69 ft)
- Population (2023): 550
  - Density: 9.5/km^{2} (25/sq mi)
- Time zone: UTC+01:00 (CET)
  - Summer (DST): UTC+02:00 (CEST)
- INSEE/Postal code: 33503 /33680
- ^{1} French Land Register data, which excludes lakes, ponds, glaciers > 1 km^{2} (0.386 sq mi or 247 acres) and river estuaries.

Saumos (French pronunciation: [somɔs]; Occitan: Saumòs) is a commune in the Gironde department in Nouvelle-Aquitaine in southwestern France.

== Population ==
Historical population
Year	Pop.	±% p.a.
1968	276	—
1975	285	+0.46%
1982	296	+0.54%
1990	346	+1.97%
1999	339	−0.23%
2007	489	+4.69%
2012	553	+2.49%
2017	532	−0.77%
2023	550	+0.56%
Source: INSEE

== See also ==
- Communes of the Gironde department
