= Le Temple, Gironde =

Le Temple
- Commune
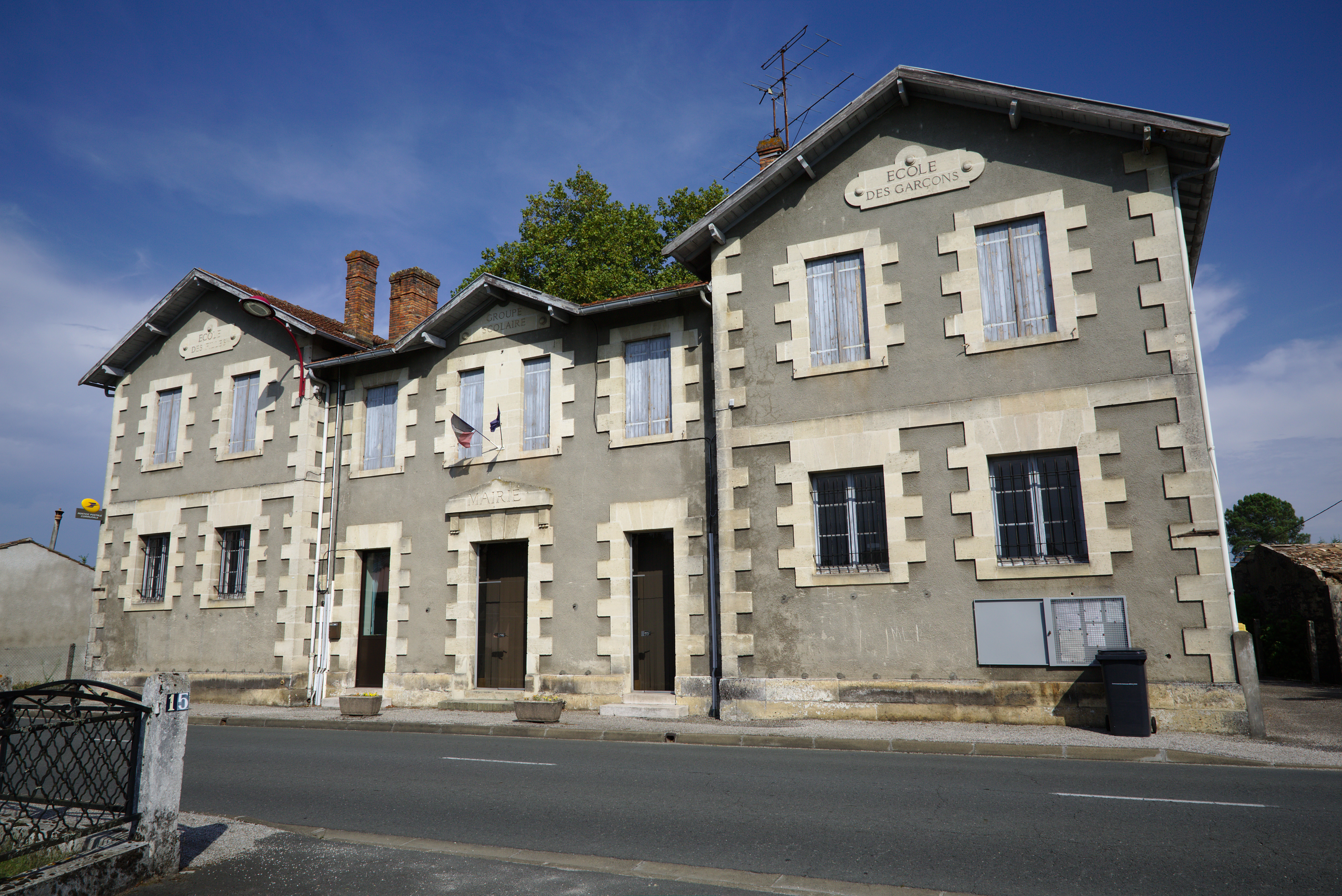
- The town hall in Le Temple

- Coat of arms
- Location of Le Temple
- Location within France Location within Nouvelle-Aquitaine
- Coordinates: 44°52′47″N 0°59′21″W
- Country: France
- Region: Nouvelle-Aquitaine
- Department: Gironde
- Arrondissement: Lesparre-Médoc
- Canton: Le Sud-Médoc
- Intercommunality: Médulienne

Government
  - Mayor (2021–2026): Karine Nouette-Gaulain
- Area^{1}: 71.83 km^{2} (27.73 sq mi)
- Elevation: 30 m (98 ft)
- Highest elevation: 47 m (154 ft)
- Lowest elevation: 29 m (95 ft)
- Population (2023): 652
  - Density: 9.08/km^{2} (23.5/sq mi)
- Time zone: UTC+01:00 (CET)
  - Summer (DST): UTC+02:00 (CEST)
- INSEE/Postal code: 33528 /33680
- ^{1} French Land Register data, which excludes lakes, ponds, glaciers > 1 km^{2} (0.386 sq mi or 247 acres) and river estuaries.

Le Temple (French pronunciation: [lə tɑ̃pl]; lit. 'The Temple'; Occitan: Lo Temple) is a commune in the Gironde department in Nouvelle-Aquitaine in southwestern France.

== Population ==
Historical population
| Year | Pop. | ±% p.a. |
|---|---|---|
| 1968 | 344 | — |
| 1975 | 403 | +2.29% |
| 1982 | 467 | +2.13% |
| 1990 | 431 | −1.00% |
| 1999 | 498 | +1.62% |
| 2007 | 517 | +0.47% |
| 2012 | 508 | −0.35% |
| 2017 | 615 | +3.90% |
| 2023 | 652 | +0.98% |
Source: INSEE

== See also ==
- Communes of the Gironde department
