= European Forest Fire Information System =

The European Forest Fire Information System (EFFIS) supports the services in charge of the protection of forests against fires in the EU and neighbor countries and provides the European Commission services and the European Parliament with updated and reliable information on wildland fires in Europe. The EFFIS started recording data in 2000.

Since 1998, EFFIS is supported by a network of experts from the countries in what is called the Expert Group on Forest Fires, which is registered under the Secretariat General of the European Commission. Currently, this group consists of experts from 43 countries in European, Middle East and North African countries. In 2015, EFFIS became one of the components of the Emergency Management Services in the EU Copernicus program.

== See also ==
- List of wildfires#Europe
