= Cestas =

- Commune
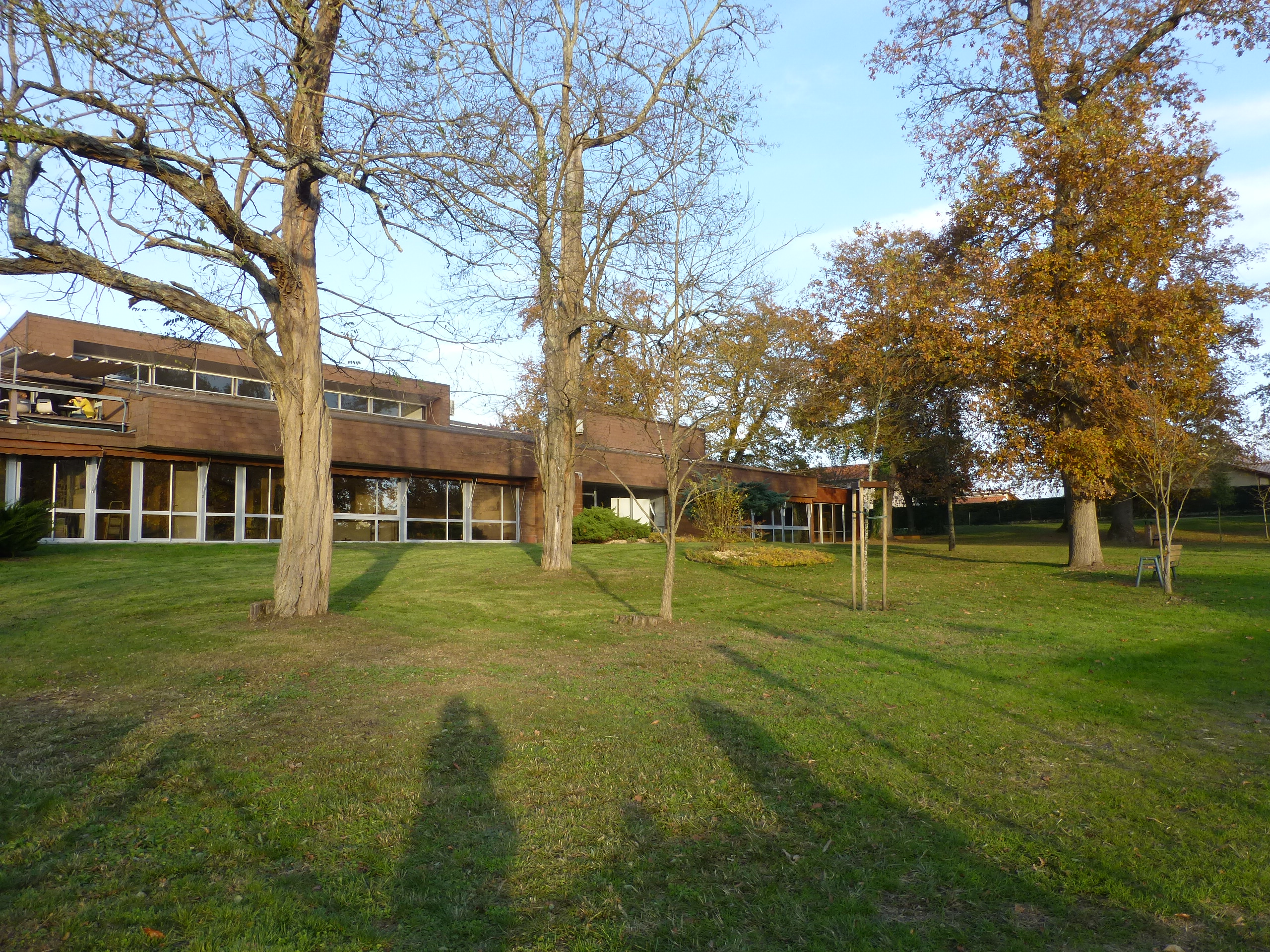
- The town hall in Cestas

- Coat of arms
- Location of Cestas
- Location within France Location within Nouvelle-Aquitaine
- Coordinates: 44°44′43″N 0°40′52″W
- Country: France
- Region: Nouvelle-Aquitaine
- Department: Gironde
- Arrondissement: Bordeaux
- Canton: Pessac-1

Government
  - Mayor (2020–2026): Pierre Ducout
- Area^{1}: 99.57 km^{2} (38.44 sq mi)
- Elevation: 67 m (220 ft)
- Highest elevation: 80 m (260 ft)
- Lowest elevation: 33 m (108 ft)
- Population (2023): 16,666
  - Density: 167.4/km^{2} (433.5/sq mi)
- Time zone: UTC+01:00 (CET)
  - Summer (DST): UTC+02:00 (CEST)
- INSEE/Postal code: 33122 /33610
- ^{1} French Land Register data, which excludes lakes, ponds, glaciers > 1 km^{2} (0.386 sq mi or 247 acres) and river estuaries.

Cestas (French pronunciation: [sɛstas]; Gascon: Cestàs) is a commune in the Gironde department in Nouvelle-Aquitaine in southwestern France.

== Population ==
Historical population
| Year | Pop. | ±% p.a. |
|---|---|---|
| 1968 | 3,548 | — |
| 1975 | 6,445 | +8.90% |
| 1982 | 13,730 | +11.41% |
| 1990 | 16,768 | +2.53% |
| 1999 | 16,927 | +0.10% |
| 2007 | 16,658 | −0.20% |
| 2012 | 16,379 | −0.34% |
| 2017 | 16,922 | +0.65% |
| 2023 | 16,666 | −0.25% |
Source: INSEE

== Economy ==
Cestas Solar Park was the biggest solar park in Europe when Neoen opened it in December 2015.

== See also ==
- Communes of the Gironde department
