= Félix Arnaudin =

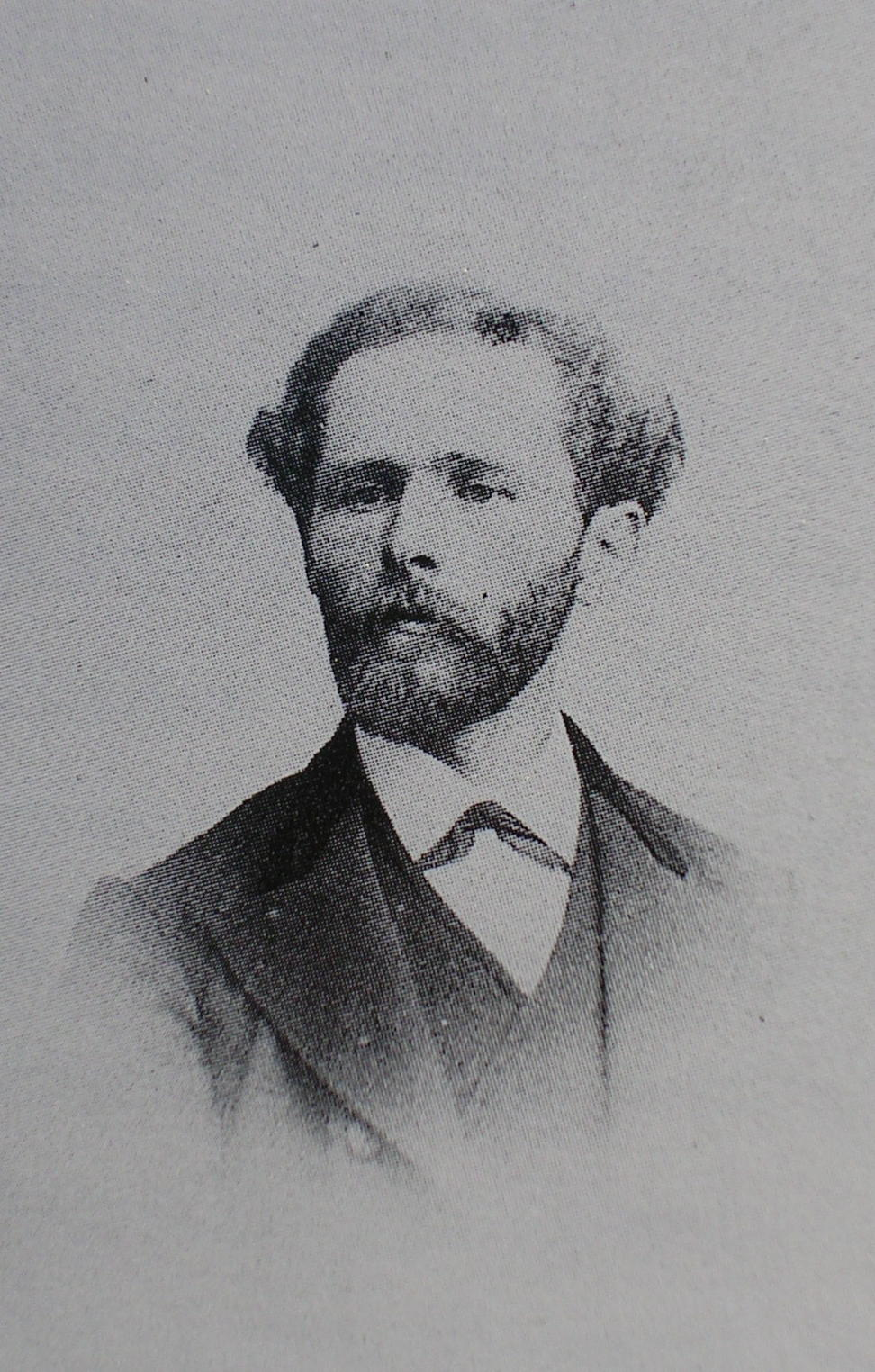
- Félix Arnaudin, C.1870; Picture by Adolphe Terpereau
- Born: Simon Arnaudin; 30 May 1844; Labouheyre, France
- Died: 6 December 1921 (aged 77); Labouheyre, France
- Occupations: Poet and photographer
- Writing career
- Language: French

Félix Arnaudin (born Simon Arnaudin; 30 May 1844 – 6 December 1921) was a French poet, photographer, and specialist in Haute-Lande folklore. In Gascony, M. Arnaudin created his collection of tales by attending gatherings, as well as eddings nd various agricultural festivals. He left 3,000 photos to the Musée d'Aquitaine in Bordeaux.

Félix Arnaudin was the first to observe Haute-Lande as a native person. He was said to be a linguist, folklorist, historian, ethnologist, photographer and writer. He became famous for studying the folklore of the Landes of Gascony, at that time in full economical and social transition. His work is centered on recording Gascon language fairy tales and songs; on land, habitations, shepherd and peasant photography. He, thus, consecrated his life to save this heritage from fading into oblivion. His natal house became a photo exhibit managed by the Labouheyre commune.

== Biography ==
His family of poor landowners settled at Labouheyre, in the Landes département, Monge district, where he was born and would die seventy-seven years later. His education at the Mont-de-Marsan college was the foundation of his later work. After earning his diploma and coming back to Labouheyre, he could not find any work related to his knowledge and interests. Living from the wages of a few métairies, he did not hold any job for long. At the age of thirty and still single, he decided to focus on his passion: to witness the shepherd culture of the Haute Lande, which would eventually be destroyed by economic changes. Being considered an eccentric by his fellow, he was called Lou Pèc (the madman, in Gascon).

Driven by the love of his country, he applied a rational and scientific approach to his research. He traveled Haute Lande from end to end, often on bicycle, to interview its inhabitants using forms. He applied the same thoroughness to making inquiry notes and photo directories.

He was a pioneer in documenting the Haute Lande in photographs. His collection is unique for its size (several thousand glass plates) and its diversity.

He focused on collecting the entirety of the culture of "the real Lande", recording tales, proverbs, songs, words of the gascon language, notes on the history, archaeology and ecology of this territory. He only managed to publish a few fragments of this large body of work during his lifetime in the form of three low audience publications:

- Contes Populaires (Popular Tales, 1887)
- Chants Populaires (Popular Songs, 1912)
- Choses de l’Ancienne Grande-Lande, (Things from the Ancient Grand Lande, printed a few days before his death)

However, those collections are only the result of an immense body of work, witnessed by several dozens of manuscripts and numerous photos (Landes' shepherd on stilts, peasants in a farm, etc.).

On 30 January 1921, a few months before his own death, he wrote the following:

"In my poor life as a savage dreamer, however anxious of our local past, I received few encouragements; indifference and mockery, a bit on all sides, willingly took their place".

== Notoriety ==
At the beginning of the 1960s, his descendants and a few fans began to take an interest in his legacy. They made new volumes of his tales, the Gascon dictionary of the Grand Landes, and two volumes of songs and proverbs. His work was testimony to a disappeared world. In 1979, all of Félix Arnaudin's manuscripts were donated by his heirs to the Parc naturel régional des Landes de Gascogne. His complete works were published by the éditions Confluences in nine volumes of Gascon/French, including an index and Gascon/French dictionary, by the scientific council of the Parc naturel régional des Landes de Gascogne.

"On 6 December 1921 died, in his house at Monge in Labouheyre, a desperate man. Félix Arnaudin was sure to have failed his mission which justified his existence. We know now that he succeeded. He gave back its honour to a slandered country which without him would have been despoiled of its memory. He saved, of this country, much more than is ordinarily possible to steal from time. He won the majority of his impossible fight against death. Death would have only won the last victory: Félix Arnaudin won, but we cannot tell him."

== Historical context ==
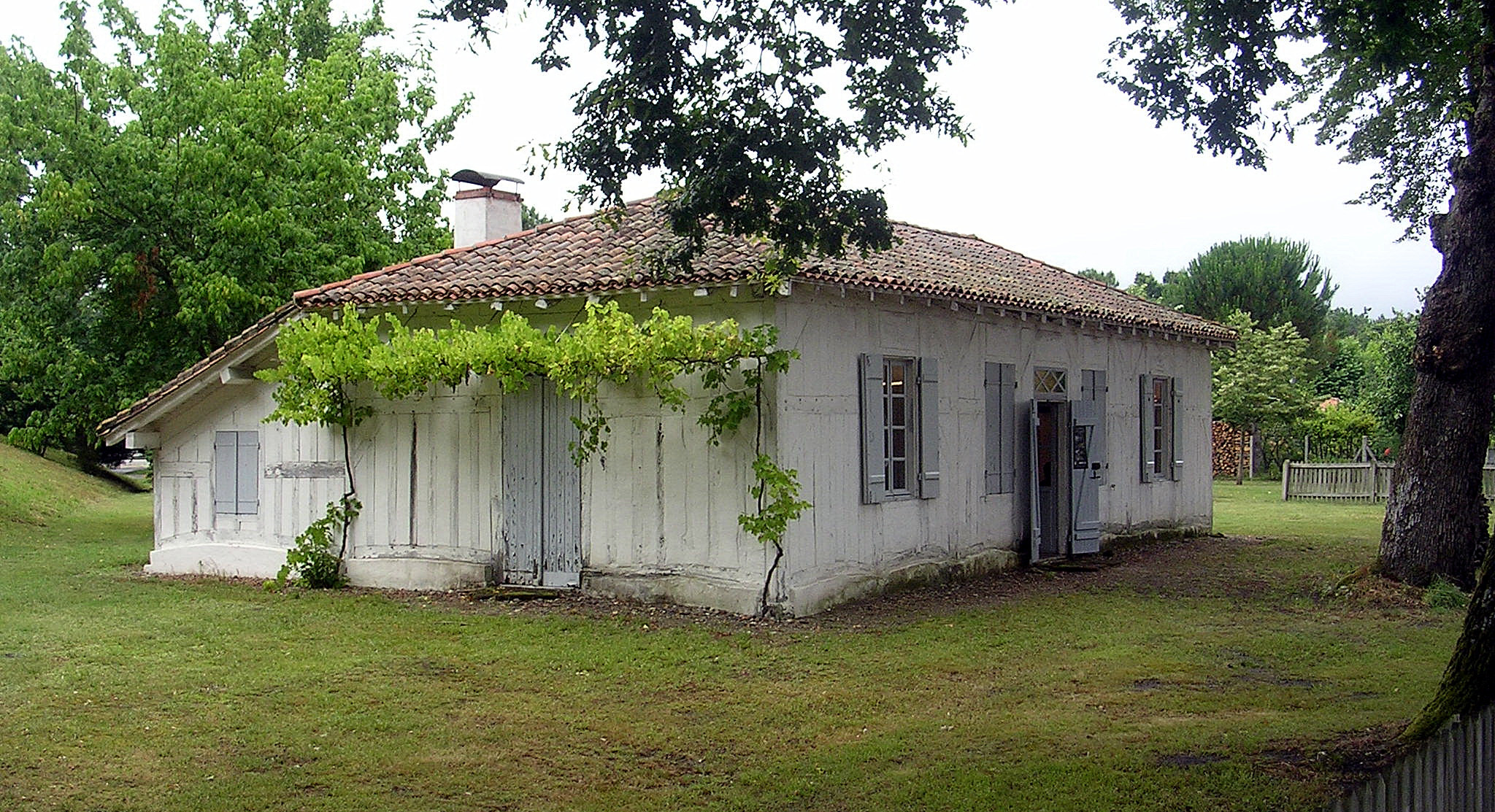
Birth house of Félix Arnaudin, at Labouheyre

Félix Arnaudin came from what is now the Landes forest but, in his time, was a mosaic of forest (of oak trees and pine trees), fields, and bare moors, on which some 650,000 sheep grazed. This country was then living under a pastoralism system, which would be broken in the middle of the 19th century by forestry. The symbolic date of this revolution is the 19 June 1857 law, on the improvement of the Landes, which stimulated communes to sell or plant trees on the Common land, and ultimately signified the end of the old pastoral system in that area.
