= Landes de Gascogne =

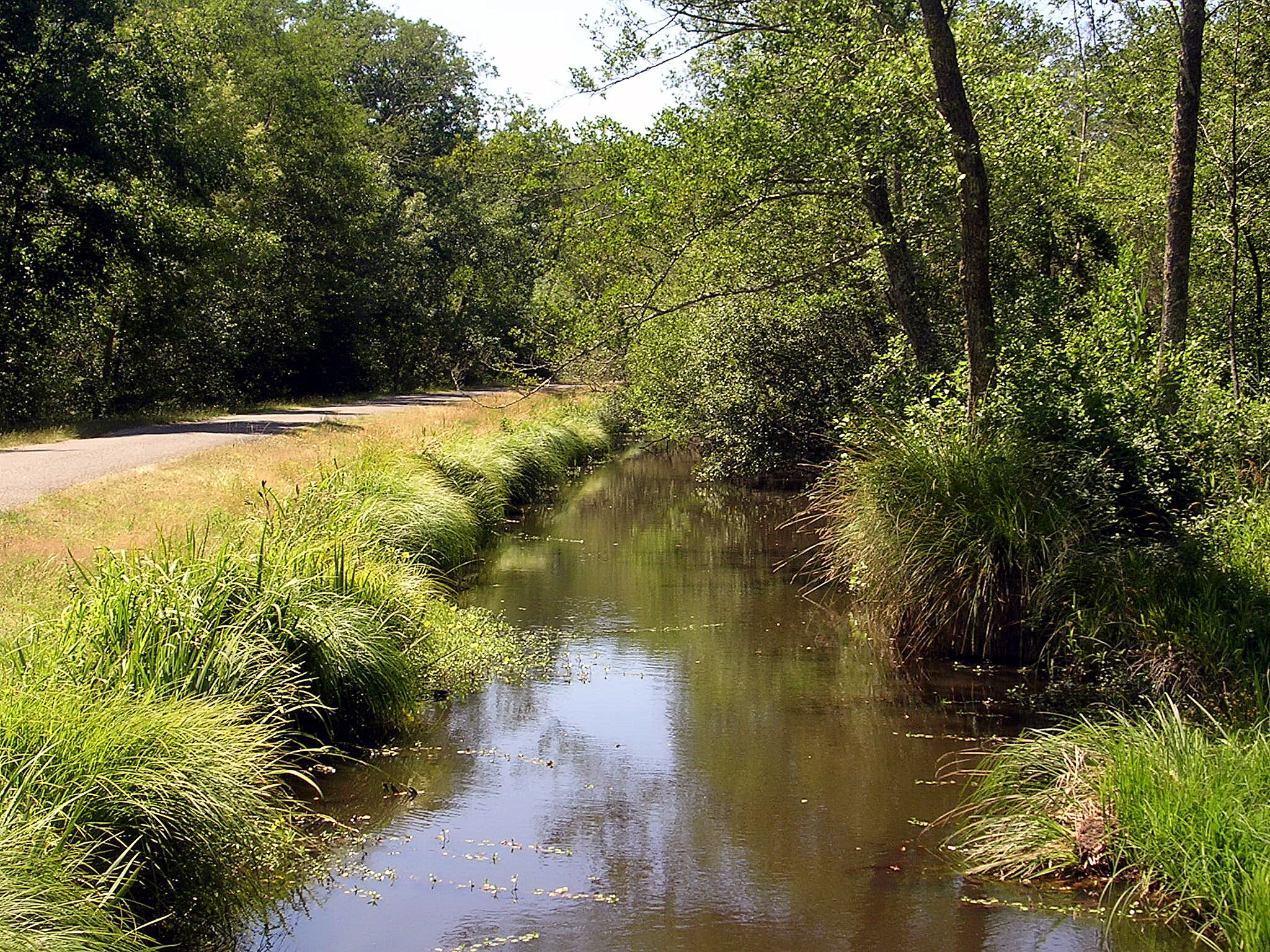
- Craste (drainage ditch) in Pays de Born

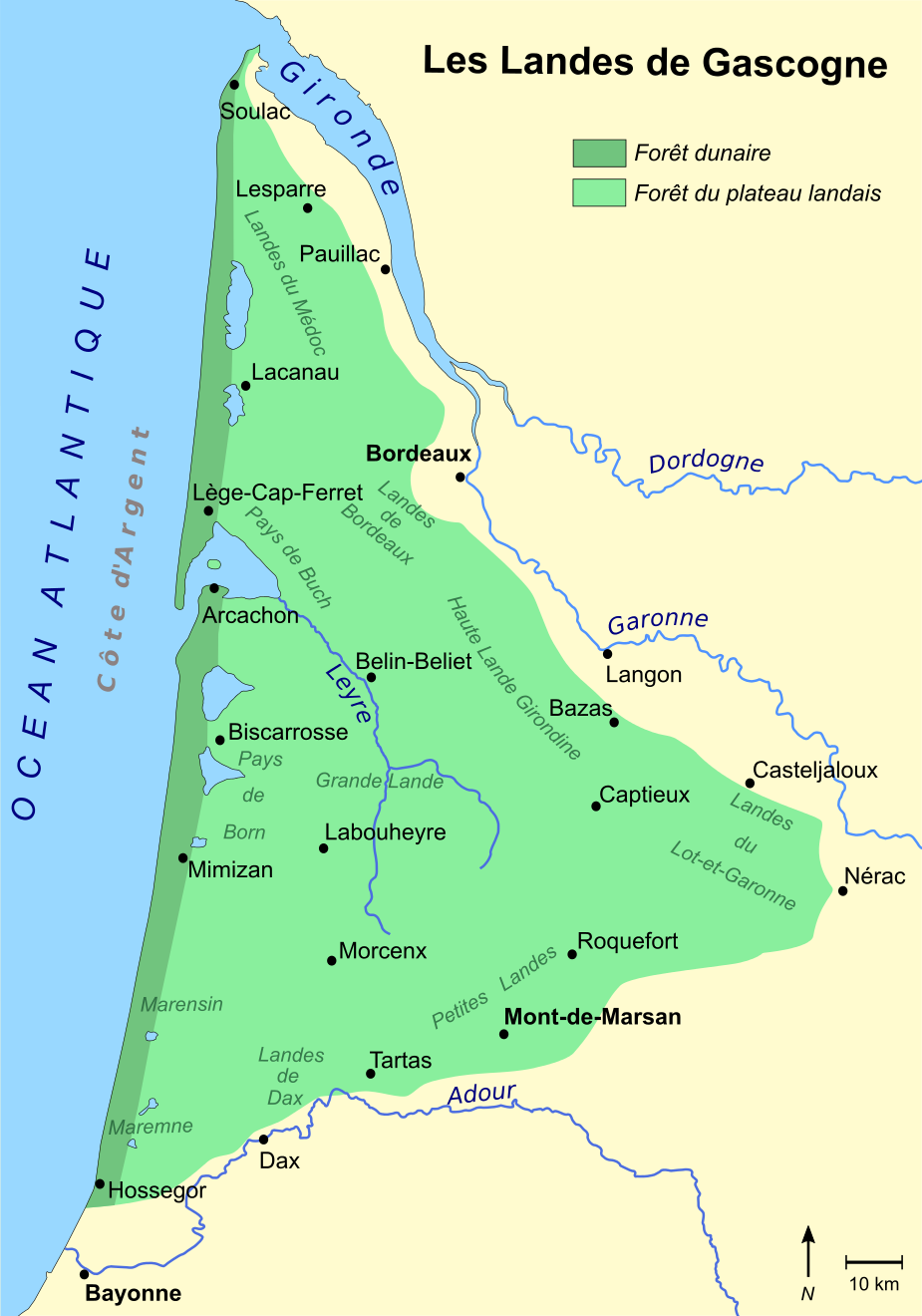

- Map of the Landes de Gascogne
- Coordinates: 44.09°N 0.917°W
- Country: France
- Region: Nouvelle-Aquitaine
- Department: Gironde; Landes; Lot-et-Garonne
- Towns: Mont-de-Marsan, Arcachon

Area
  - Total: 14,000 km^{2} (5,400 sq mi)

The Landes de Gascogne (French pronunciation: [lɑ̃d də ɡaskɔɲ]; in Gascon, classic spelling las Lanas de Gasconha, Fébusienne spelling leus Lanes de Gascougne), or Gascony Moors, is a natural region of France of nearly 14000 km². It extends over three departments: Gironde, Landes and Lot-et-Garonne, and includes 386 communes. The region is a flat, sandy plain in the west of the Aquitaine Basin beside the Atlantic Ocean. The interior is cut off from the sea by a barrier of dunes. It is dominated by pine forests that cover 66% of the territory, with islets of agriculture over 18% of the territory.

A periglacial desert during the Last Glacial Period, the Landes de Gascogne was later covered by a mixed forest of deciduous and coniferous trees as the climate warmed in the Holocene. This was largely cleared by humans around 600 AD and replaced by moorland (landes). Both sheep and cattle grazed here, but an epizootic in 1775 destroyed the cows and only sheep remained. The popular image of the Landes was that of a Gascon shepherd standing on stilts to watch over his flock. In the early 19th century the dunes were stabilized, and in the second half of the 19th century an intensive plantation program replaced much of the heathland with stands of maritime pine. Today the economy is dominated by tourism along the coast and forestry for the paper industry in the interior.

== Description ==
=== General ===
The region is a sloping and generally flat sedimentary plateau characterized by poor, sandy soil.

It is this flatness, with the coastal dune barrier preventing the easy flow of fresh water towards the sea, which gave the region its character of wetland, at least before the major drainage works, the fixing of dunes and pine plantation from the end of the 18th century and throughout the 19th century. The landscape of wet moors, surveyed by Landes shepherds on stilts, gave way in the mid-nineteenth century to the first forest in France: the Landes de Gascogne forest which extends over the “triangle of the Landes” (Soulac, Nérac, Hossegor). On the occasion of certain folk festivals, the shepherds once again become the waders of the Landes of yesteryear, who guarded their flocks, dressed in sheepskins, perched high on their stilts.

The region has undergone a profound transformation as a result of these works which in less than a century have completely changed an economy and a culture that was thousands of years old. The agro-pastoral system has given way to industrial sap tapping (previously practiced only in natural coastal forests), and gradually to the timber industry. Industrial and commercial agriculture trials were unsuccessful until the arrival of corn in the 1960s. It is a region that is becoming urbanized and peri-urbanized (+ 2.3% per year in urban sprawl from 2006 to 2009).

The coastline took on more importance with the development of seaside and resort tourism from the mid-nineteenth century (notably with the arrival of the train from 1841 to La Teste-de-Buch, then to Bayonne and Lacanau). Tourism remains an important source of seasonal jobs. The population is rising sharply, with around 839,200 people in 2006 (i.e. + 60% in forty years, + 0.9% / year from 1990 to 1999, + 1.4% per year from 1999 to 2006, 2/3 of the new residents coming from other regions).

International competition and technological developments have hit the forest economy hard, but it remains one of the main sources of wealth in Nouvelle-Aquitaine.

=== Location ===
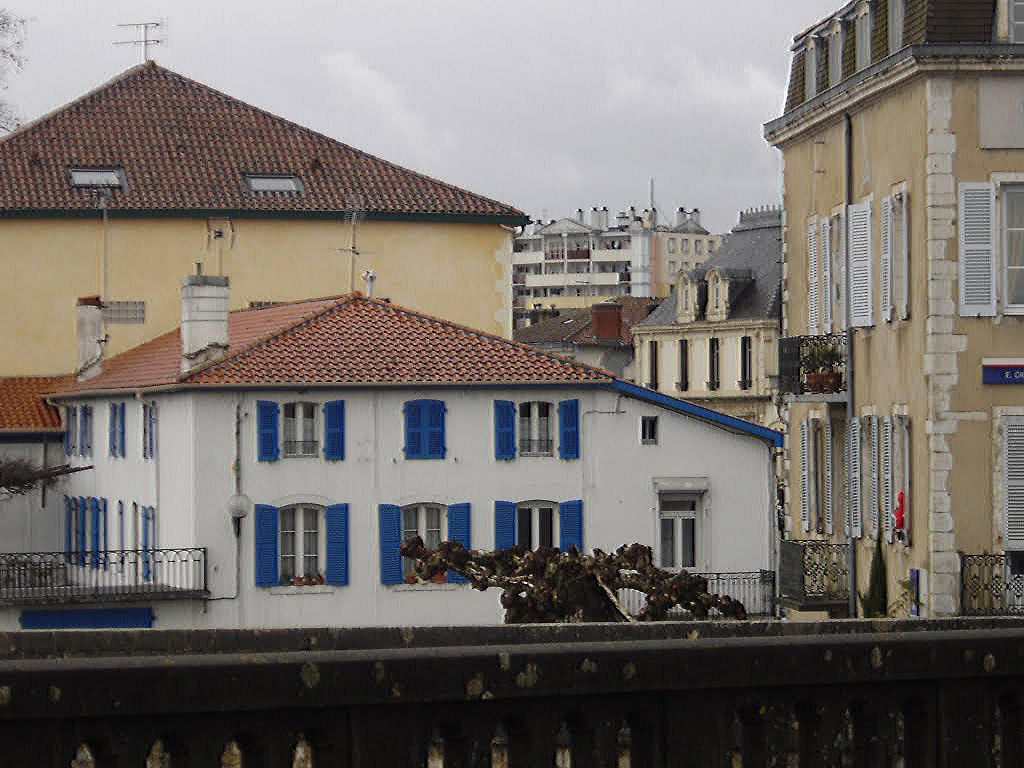
Old buildings in Dax, Landes

The Landes de Gascogne are bordered to the west by the Atlantic Ocean and to the north-east by the wine-growing fringe of the Médoc, the Bordelais, the Bazadais and the Queyran. To the south-east they are bordered by the Pays d'Albret and the Ténarèze, with the course of the Gélise as boundary, Armagnac, Tursan, Chalosse, the Pays d'Orthe and the Seignanx.

=== Main towns ===
- Gironde : La Teste-de-Buch, Arcachon.
- Landes : Dax, Mont-de-Marsan.

=== Resorts ===
The Landes de Gascogne coastline is part of the Côte d'Argent. Seaside resorts include:

- Gironde : Soulac, Montalivet, Hourtin, Carcans-Maubuisson, Lacanau, Le Porge, Lège-Cap-Ferret, Arcachon, Pyla-sur-Mer;
- Landes : Biscarrosse, Mimizan, Contis, Lit-et-Mixe, Saint-Girons, Moliets, Vieux-Boucau-les-Bains, Soustons, Seignosse, Hossegor, Capbreton.

=== Landes forest ===
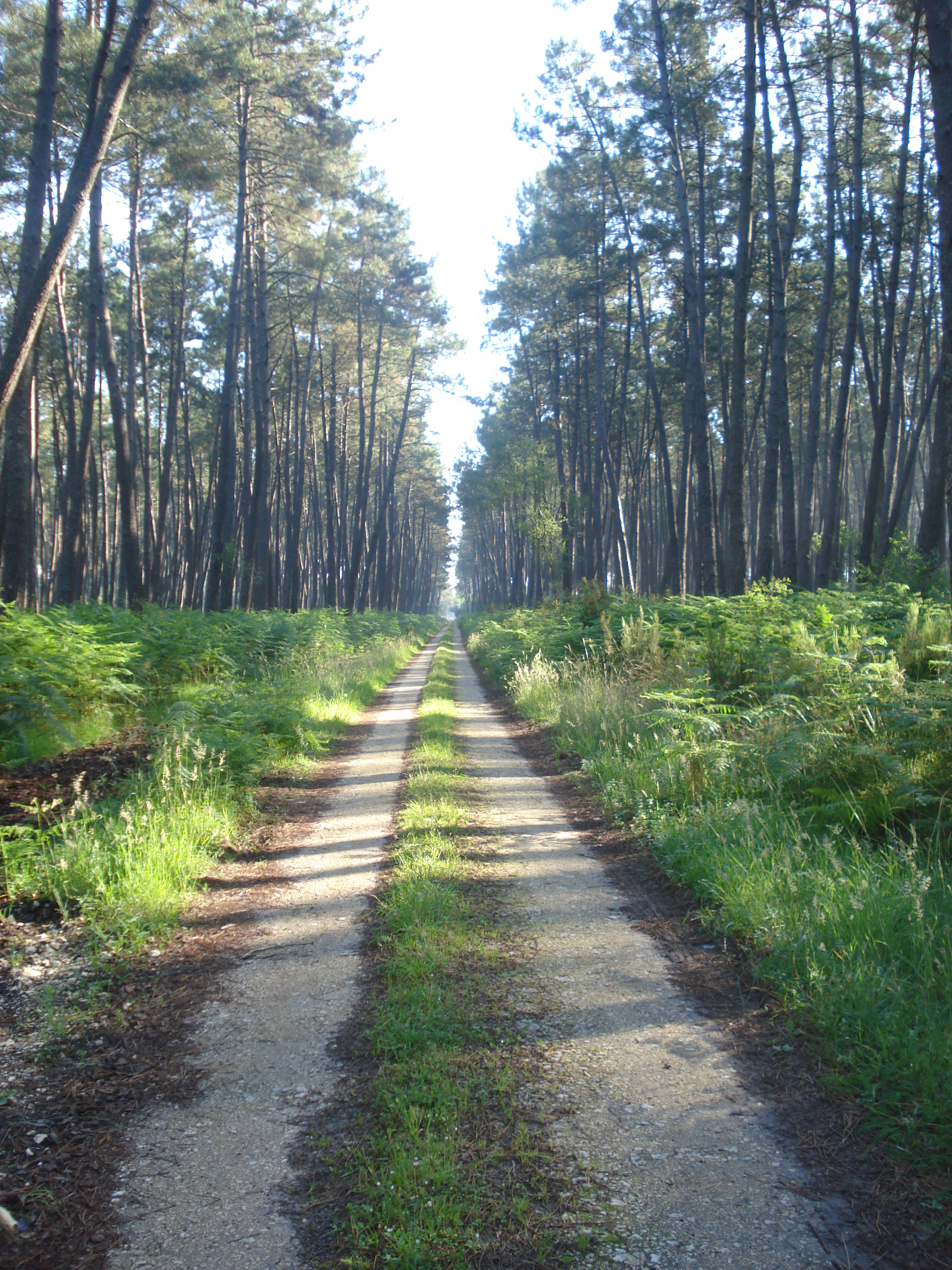
Forest path in Retjons

The Landes forest covers 9,740 square kilometres (3,760 sq mi). It is a vast triangle stretching from Soulac to Hossegor and as far as Nérac. It covers most of the departments of Gironde and Landes as well as the west of Lot-et-Garonne. About 9% of the forest area is on the coastal dunes and about 91% is inland on the sandy plain of the Landes plateau.

The pine forest covered only 2,000 square kilometres (770 sq mi) before systematic afforestation of the dunes and the Landes plateau modified this landscape. Nowadays maritime pine (Pinus pinaster), the predominant species, represents 80% of the trees that make up the forest. The remaining 20% is made up of oaks, elms, lime trees, chestnut trees, alders, laurels, strawberry trees, plum trees, apple trees, cherry trees, etc. Maritime pines were 85% of trees on over 8,030 square kilometres (3,100 sq mi) at the start of the 21st century. The composition of the massif is changing, with an increasing proportion of deciduous trees, natural or introduced, which has risen from 8% to 15% in the ten years from 2000 to 2010.

The Landes forest includes diverse landscapes. To the north, the proximity of the Bordeaux vineyards offers landscapes of mixed pine and vines, where Échoppes and traditional Landes houses rub shoulders. To the south, the pines gradually give way to the green hills of the Chalosse in the foothills of the Pyrenees. The Côte d'Argent is home to forests with a different undergrowth from that of the interior of the Landes. Strawberry trees (Arbutus unedo), holm oaks (Quercus ilex) and cork oaks (Quercus suber) share the light that is not captured by the pines. At the heart of the forest massif, the presence of a few streams, and in particular the Leyre, is conducive to the development of a forest made up of deciduous trees often hiding the river: the gallery forest.

The wooded area was affected by two major storms, Cyclone Martin (1999) and Cyclone Klaus (2009), during which 26% of the Landes forest by area suffered more than 40% damage to the maritime pines. Especially since the 1976 drought, the massif has also been a regular victim of attacks by pine processionary caterpillars, bark beetles and other pests to which monospecific stands are particularly sensitive, and has been periodically threatened by forest fires.

Evolution of forest cover in the Landes de Gascogne

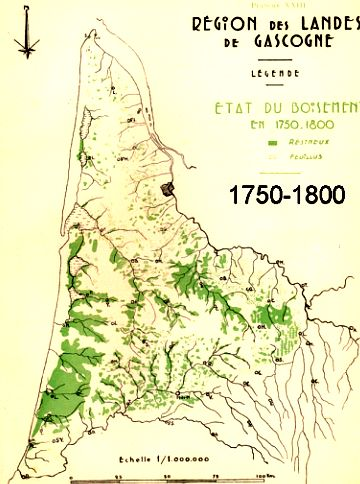

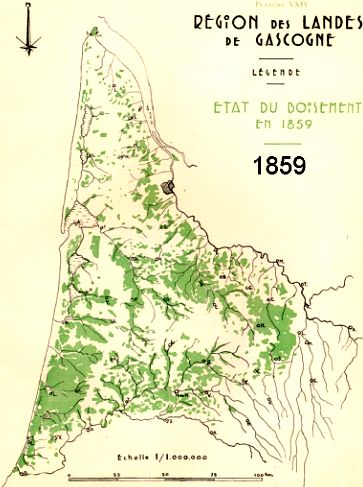

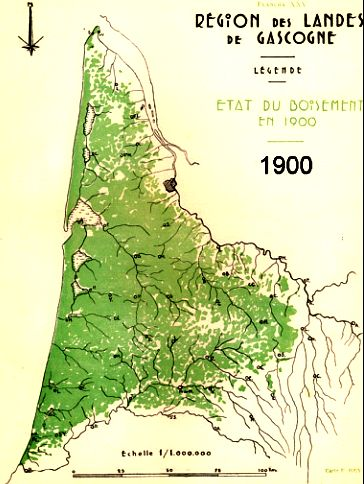

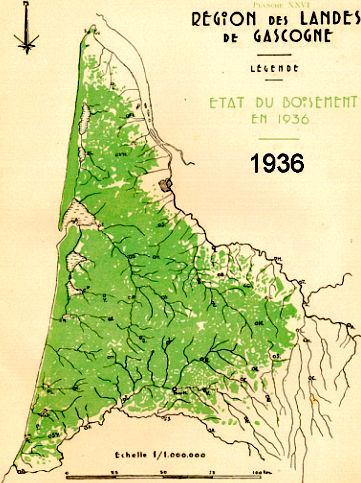

=== Etymology ===
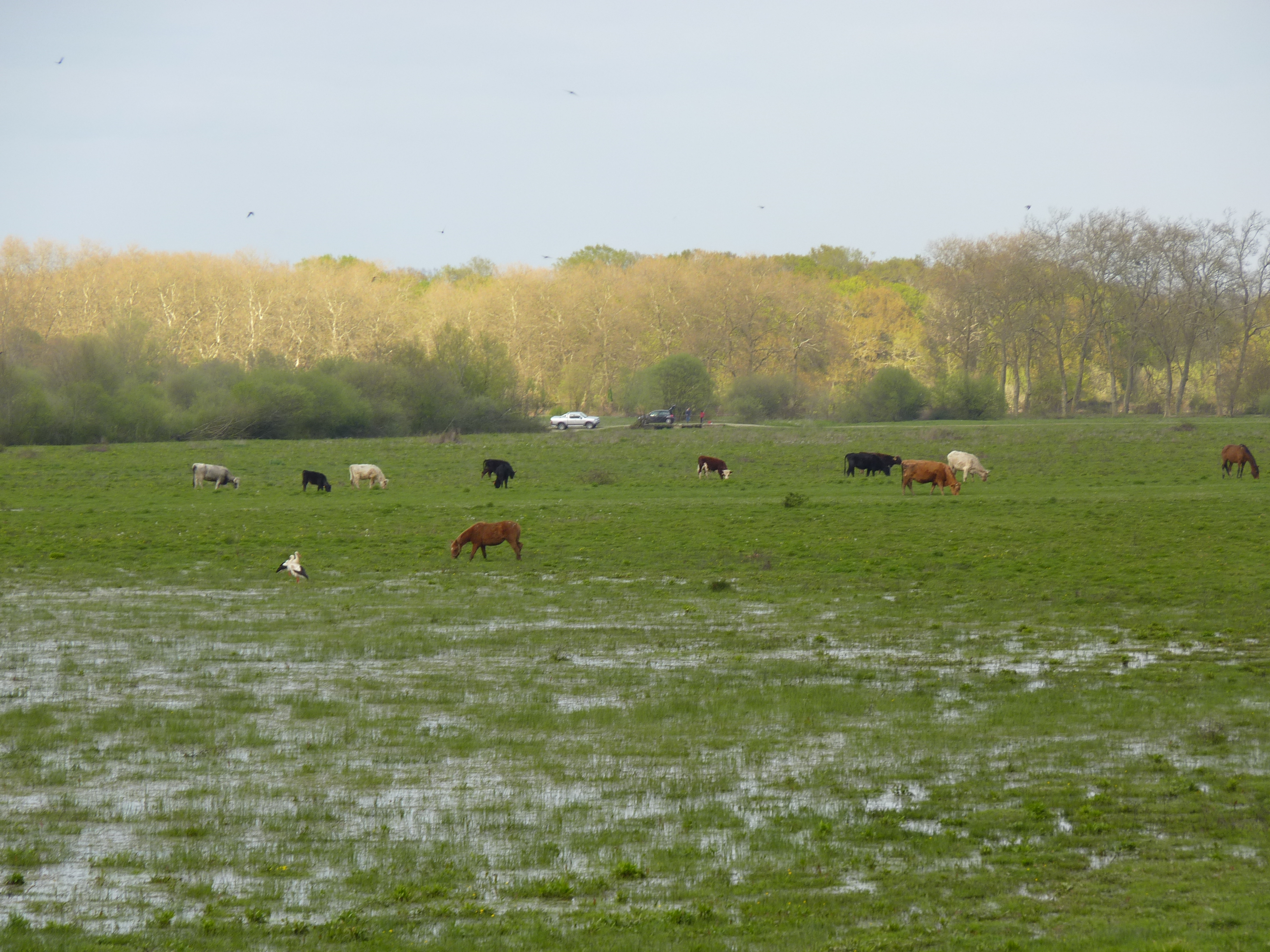
Marshy meadows of the Adour river, Seignanx

The common word lande (moor) (in Gascon lana / lanne) comes from the Celtic landa alteration of lann enda, that is to say the ends of the land (flat) or the plain, here the great Aquitaine plain. It is a common allusion to maritime borders as well as to their characteristic vegetation, this last vegetal meaning being later and specific to peasant traditions.

The Latin term ager syrticus is another name that recalls that it is about a vast maritime shore, sometimes inundated and marshy, which the ancient cultivators of the Landes sands literally translated as "land worked by the intrusions of the sea or by invasion of waters blocked by dunes and which cannot thus freely access the maritime shores, lands also shaped by the sand-carrying winds, sometimes destroying all life in the wind and which blow in grapeshot, sometimes tens of leagues from the sea, not refraining from bursting into the good countries with a bang". It is this last term ager syrticus passed in medieval Latin which appears on the sketches of the first Carolingian maps, above a white space between Bordeaux and Adour, as in the Universal Geography of Anton Friedrich Büsching in the Age of Enlightenment.

The appellation "Landes de Gascogne" only appears in the 19th century, the region being designated before that by "Landes de Bordeaux", which has a more restrictive meaning today.

== Geology ==
The Cenozoic limestone and molassic substratum of the Aquitaine Basin was affected by tectonic movements which produced an open trench on the Atlantic platform near Biscarrosse. At the end of the Miocene, sediments of oceanic and detrital origin from the Pyrenees accumulated. Subsequently, several processes would result in what is called the "sands of the Landes":

- At the base, a siliceous clay-sand complex of fluvial and lacustrine origin, 20 to 100 metres (66 to 328 ft) thick (kaolinite clays from Luxey-Pissos, Pliocene lignites from Lamothe and Arjuzanx)
- At the top, fine quartz sands of aeolian origin, a few meters thick;
- Between the two, siliceous sandstones colored with organic matter and sandstones with ferruginous cement (alios, garluche) in leached podzols.

== Geography ==
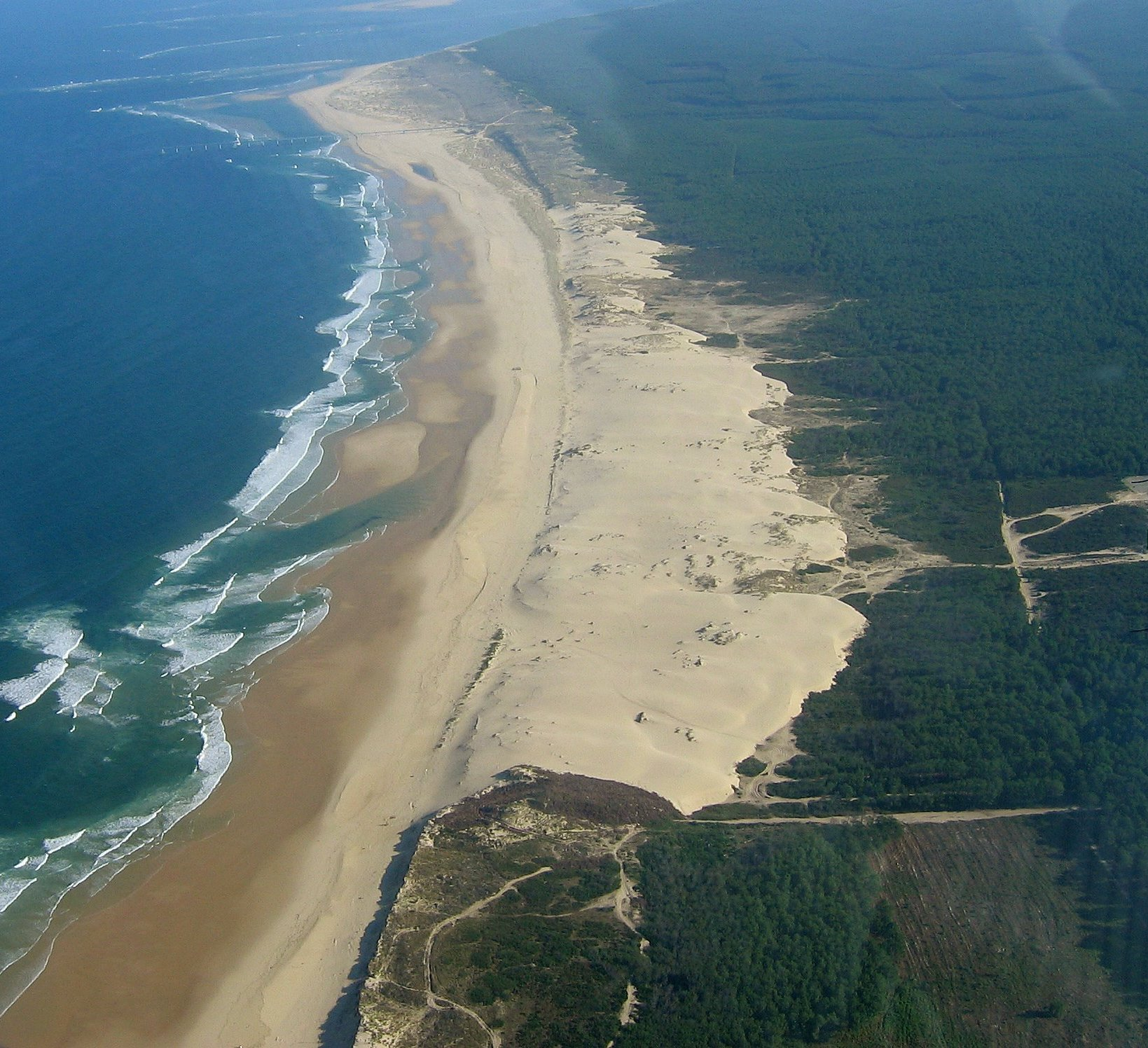
The Trencat dune in the Teste de Buch, an example of an unstabilized dune

The coast is protected by dunes, with unique vegetation, which deprive many small coastal rivers of access to the ocean and lead to the formation of a string of lakes. Arcachon Bay is the only breach in the Landes dune cordon, which is 200 kilometres (120 mi) long.

== History ==
=== Before the "Landes desert" ===
The Landes to Gascogne was a periglacial desert between 21,000 BC and 16,000 BC. Loess, fine sediment produced by glaciation, was blown into the Aquitanian Basin forming a sandy desert. During the Magdalenian period of the Upper Paleolithic, the Landes de Gascogne was uninhabited (but not uncrossable). It formed a "quasi-cultural barrier" between the people living on either side of it.

Concerning the history of the vegetation, based on pollen data, the Landes de Gascogne territory was covered by an important diversified forest (oak, elm, lime, ash, beech, pine, etc.) during the first half of the Holocene (9,700 to 3,900 BC). At the start of the Holocene the forest cover was characterized by a large pine forest, replaced around 6000–5500 BC by an oak grove rich in heliophyte trees and shrubs (birch, hazel, alder, etc.). Although it was subject to regular deforestation from the late Neolithic (around 3500 BC) this forest persisted until the beginning of the Middle Ages (around 600 AD), from which time the intensification of human activities leads in certain sectors to its disappearance and replacement by moorland.

Concerning human occupation, pollen data indicate anthropization dating back to the first half of the Early Neolithic (5,500–6,000 years BC), without archaeological remains to confirm this. The occupation is perennial from the late Neolithic (3500 BC), intensifies during Protohistory (from 3500 BC) and reaches a peak during the Middle Ages. The traditional image of the Grande-Lande is of a marginal or inhospitable space, caricatured under the term "Landes desert". However, this space should be reconsidered as previously densely populated and exploited from the end of the Neolithic period.

=== Agro-pastoral system ===
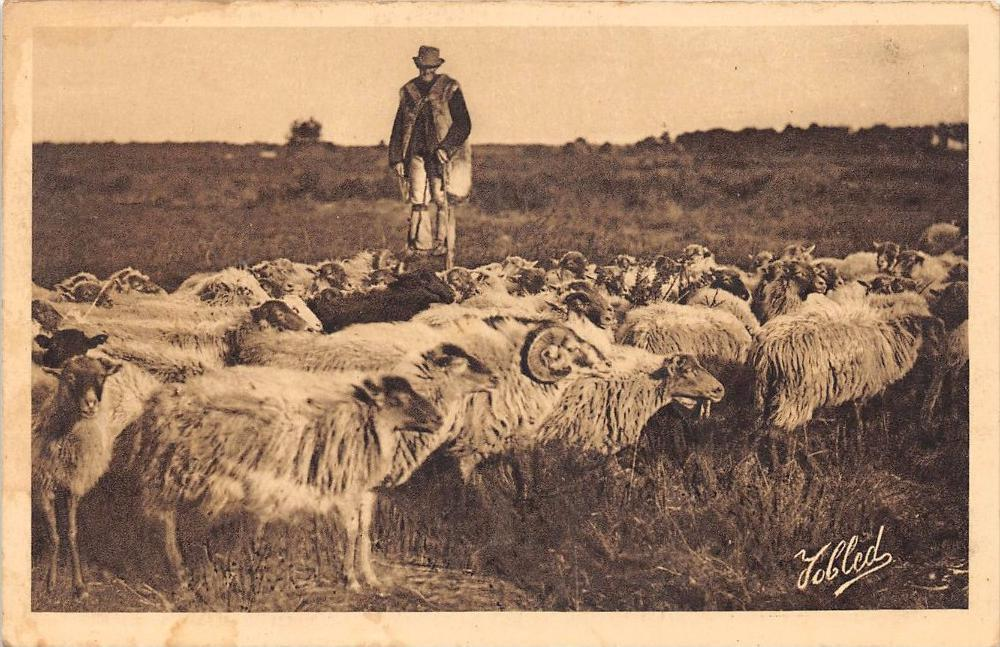
Landes shepherd

(For more information on the Gironde Landes in the 18th century, see Jacques Baurein, Variétés Bordeloises, article XXXIX, pages 412–422.)

Until the middle of the 19th century, the inhabitants of the Landes had to contend with the extreme poverty of the soils of their communes. The moor consisted of vast expanses of bare, swampy, flat and unhealthy land. The Landais lived by the agro-pastoral system. Grouped together in "airials" (small isolated hamlets), they cultivated rye and millet, the basis of their meager diet, and raised sheep whose role was to fertilize the land. The image of Landes shepherds perched on their stilts comes from this period. This means of locomotion was perfectly adapted to monitor the herds, and to move quickly over long distances.

According to historians cows were numerous before the classic image emerged of the Landes shepherd watching from the top of his stilts as his sheep grazed the short heath. The great epizootic of 1775 destroyed the cows and sheep prevailed. Likewise, it was only after the disappearance of a large part of the forest, decimated in the 17th century by frost, fires and deforestation, that short heath emerged at the end of the 18th century.

On the initiative of the "Captaux de Buch", local lords in the Pays de Buch, Nicolas Brémontier undertook to fix the moving sands of the coast which threatened the neighboring dwellings. Later François Jules Hilaire Chambrelent drained the moor by digging ditches, locally called crastes. Indeed, the situation had become difficult in the moors, where all agricultural experiments (rice, mulberry trees, peanuts, tobacco, etc.) had so far failed. Sandy and soggy soils did not allow crops to grow, and malaria epidemics decimated the population.

Pine was, and remains, the only species that could grow in the poor soils of the moors. This work resulted in the law of 19 June 1857, which required all the municipalities of the Landes de Gascogne to drain their wet moors to enhance them, in particular by afforestation with maritime pine (Pinus pinaster). Due to lack of financial means, most municipalities were forced to sell their moors to individuals, thus privatizing the municipalities. Until then, the region had 200,000 hectares (490,000 acres) of natural forests, which would be extended throughout the Landes de Gascogne. The face of the region was profoundly transformed and the pine became the "golden tree" for its resin.

=== Fixation of the dunes ===
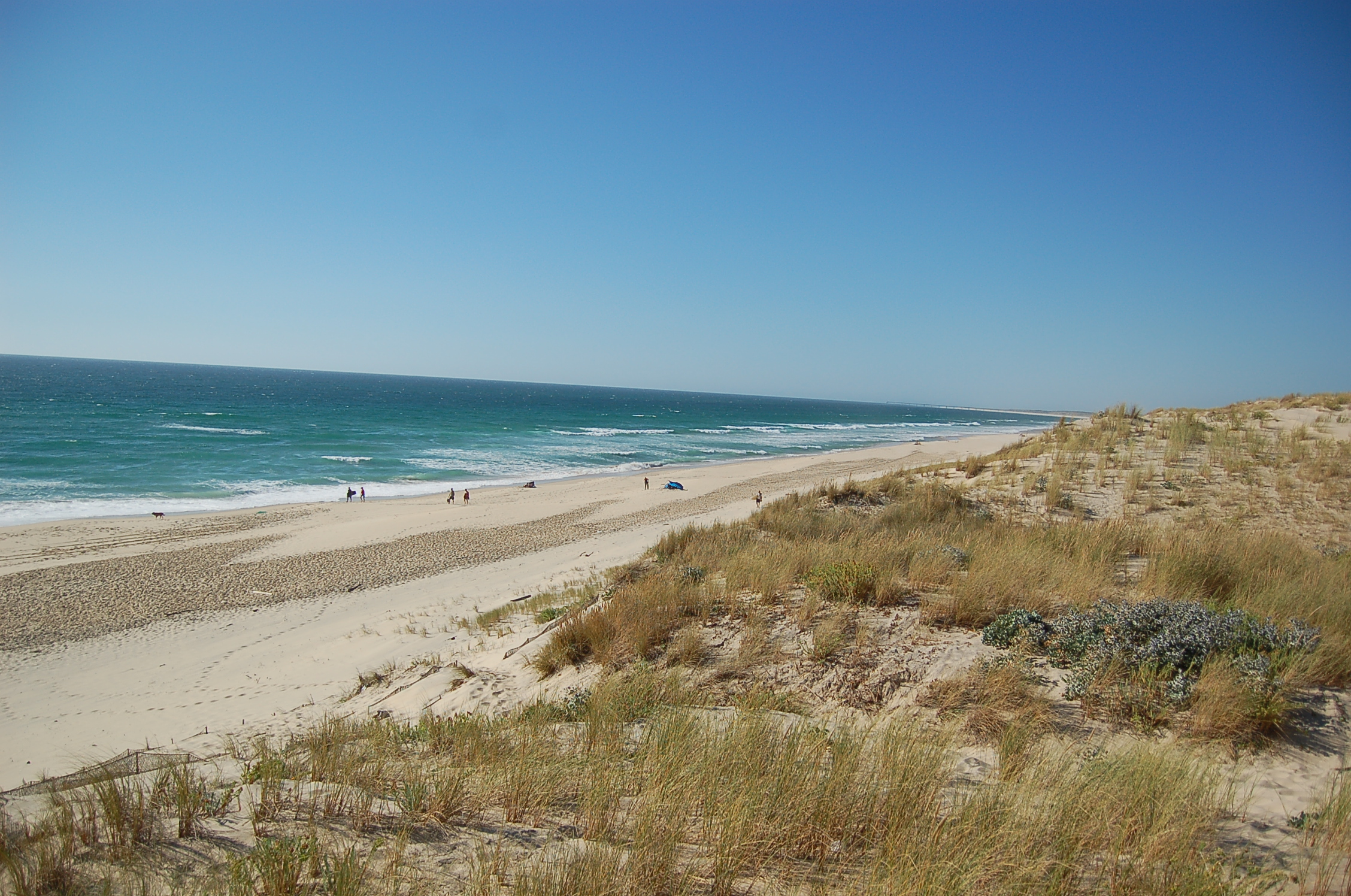
Coast at Biscarrosse

Until the shifting dunes of the Aquitaine coast were fixed, the wind regularly carried large amounts of sand inland. Many villages had to be moved or rebuilt. The pioneers of the fixation include the Captaux of the de Ruat family who carried out conclusive tests at La Teste-de-Buch at the end of the 18th century. This work was extended to the entire coast by men like Guillaume Desbiey, Baron Charlevoix de Villiers, François Jules Hilaire Chambrelent, Toussaint Catros and Nicolas Brémontier. The French state took charge of building a stabilized coastal barrier during the nineteenth century: in 1876 88,000 hectares (220,000 acres) were fixed. During the twentieth century, the National Forestry Office (ONF) managed and maintained these dunes.

=== Tapping ===
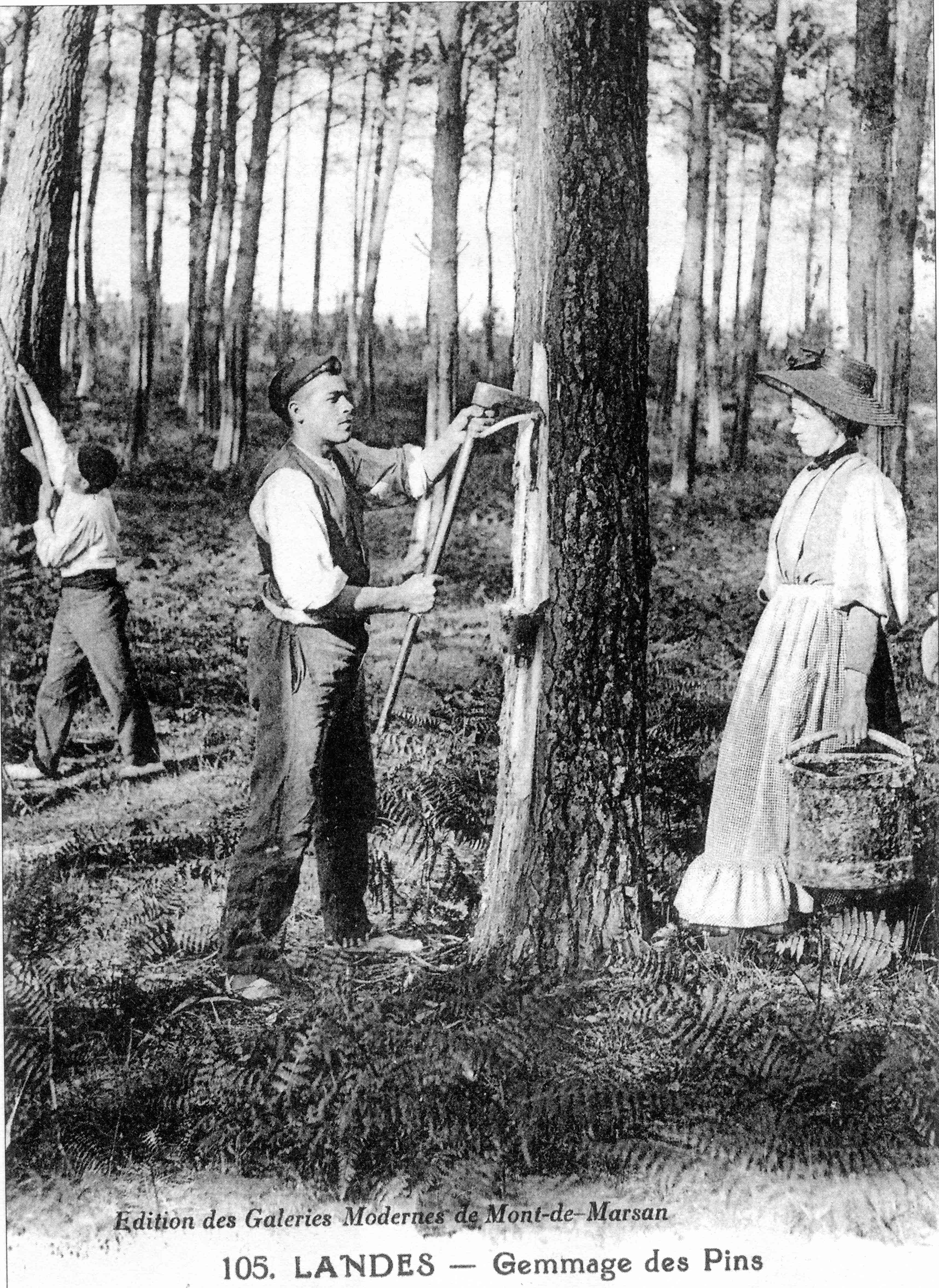
A resin harvester using the "pike".

Tapping trees is a thousand-year-old activity in the Landes de Gascogne. The first tappers exploited the embryos of what would become the largest forest in Europe to make a sort of tar used for caulking boats. They were found near the coast, in Lacanau, La Teste-de-Buch, Arcachon, Biscarrosse and Hossegor. With the disappearance of pastoralism and the massive plantations of maritime pines, the tapping process spread throughout the forest and became a flagship industrial activity of the region until the 1950s. After distillation of the harvested resin, two compounds are obtained that are useful for industry: rosin (70%) and turpentine (20%). The outlets were mainly in the chemical industry. Tapping disappeared at the end of the 1980s, and nowadays the Landes Forest feeds the paper industry. Tourism has also been one of the region's main sources of income since the beginning of the 20th century.

=== 1945 Ordinance and its extensions ===
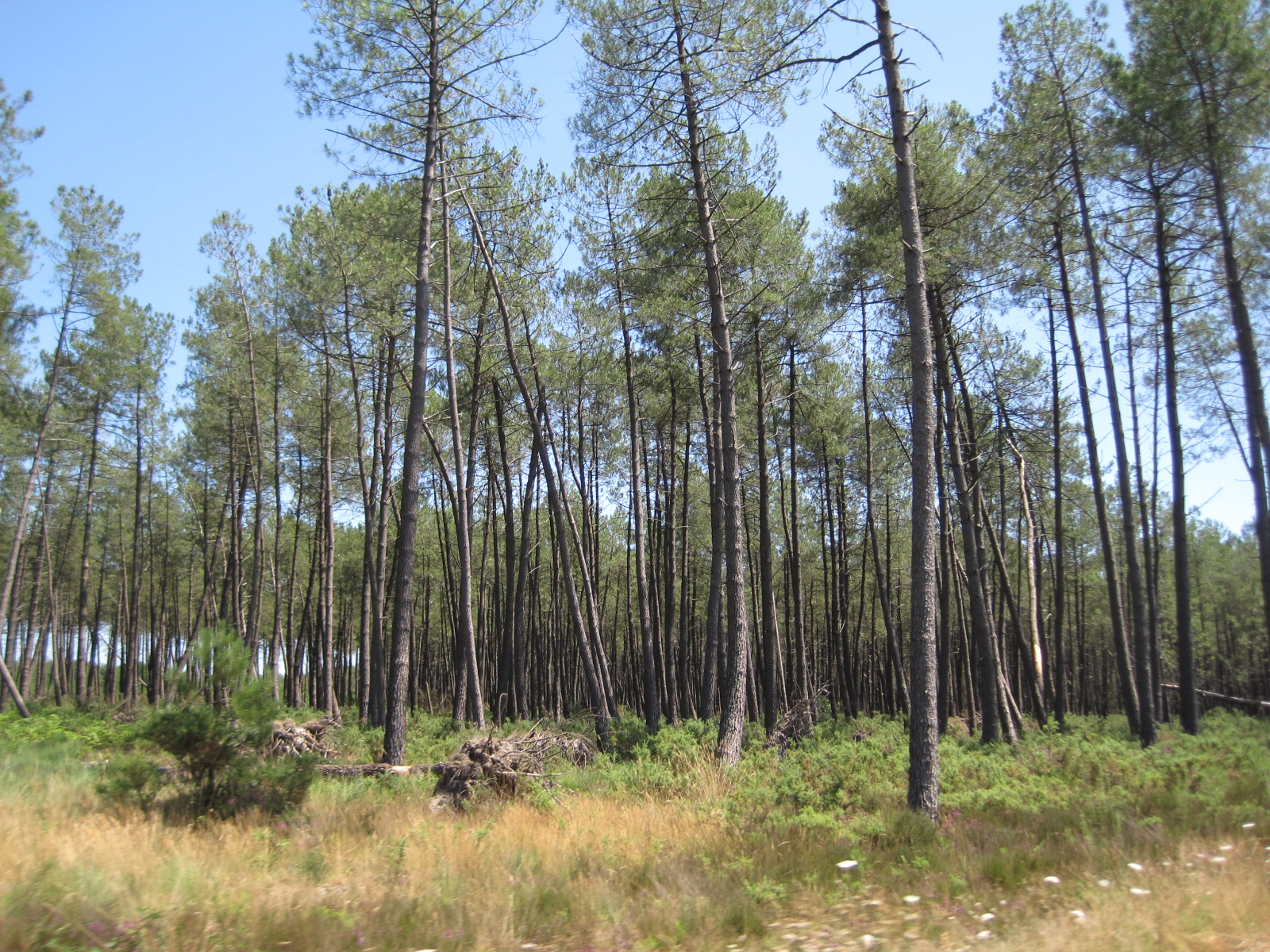
Landes forest

In the nineteenth century, after the great reforestation of the 1850–1880 period that followed the law of 1857, wildfires became more serious, especially during the years of great droughts such as 1871, 1893, 1922 and 1937. During World War II, the usual causes of fires in peacetime such as lightning and carelessness were supplemented by causes linked to hostilities such as guerrillas of the French Resistance, plane crashes, landmines in the coastal dunes and scarcity of firefighters. It is estimated that between 1942 and 1945 over 300,000 hectares (740,000 acres) were destroyed.

Faced with the scale of the disasters, at the Liberation of France the Provisional Government of the French Republic issued the Ordinance of 28 April 1945 relating to the development of the Landes de Gascogne region. The explanatory memorandum states that,

The Landes forest is in the process of declining ... The existence of these desert expanses of tens of thousands of hectares practically abandoned by their owners following fires or unregenerated logging resulting from faulty sanitation, is unworthy of a large country like France. ... The State must immediately compensate for the powerlessness of the Landes owners by considerable and very urgent works of construction of roads, digging of canals, defense against fires, electrification of the villages and supply of drinking water of the rural populations.

A first credit of four hundred million old francs was committed from the state budget.

There followed the regional decree of the Commissioner of the Republic in Bordeaux of 26 March 1946, which required the creation of organizations, voluntary or official, for defense of forests against fire in all the municipalities of the forest massif. Next the decree of 25 March 1947 created in each of the three departments of the Landes de Gascogne (Gironde, Landes and Lot-et-Garonne) a corps of professional forest firefighters. As early as 1948, large credits from the National Forest Fund recently created in 1946 were granted to reforest disaster areas and to equip the massif with preventive means and active control.

After the 1949 Landes forest fire claimed 82 lives, a backup plan called the "Plan de Labouheyre" was drawn up. A Regional Commission of Landes de Gascogne was immediately constituted which met for the first time on 16 November 1949 in Labouheyre, Landes. It concluded an agreement between public services and forest owners for organization of a fire defense. A Central Commission replaced the regional one by ministerial decree of 17 December 1949. A network of firebreaks, tracks and drainage ditches was built.

== The Landes, what definition? ==
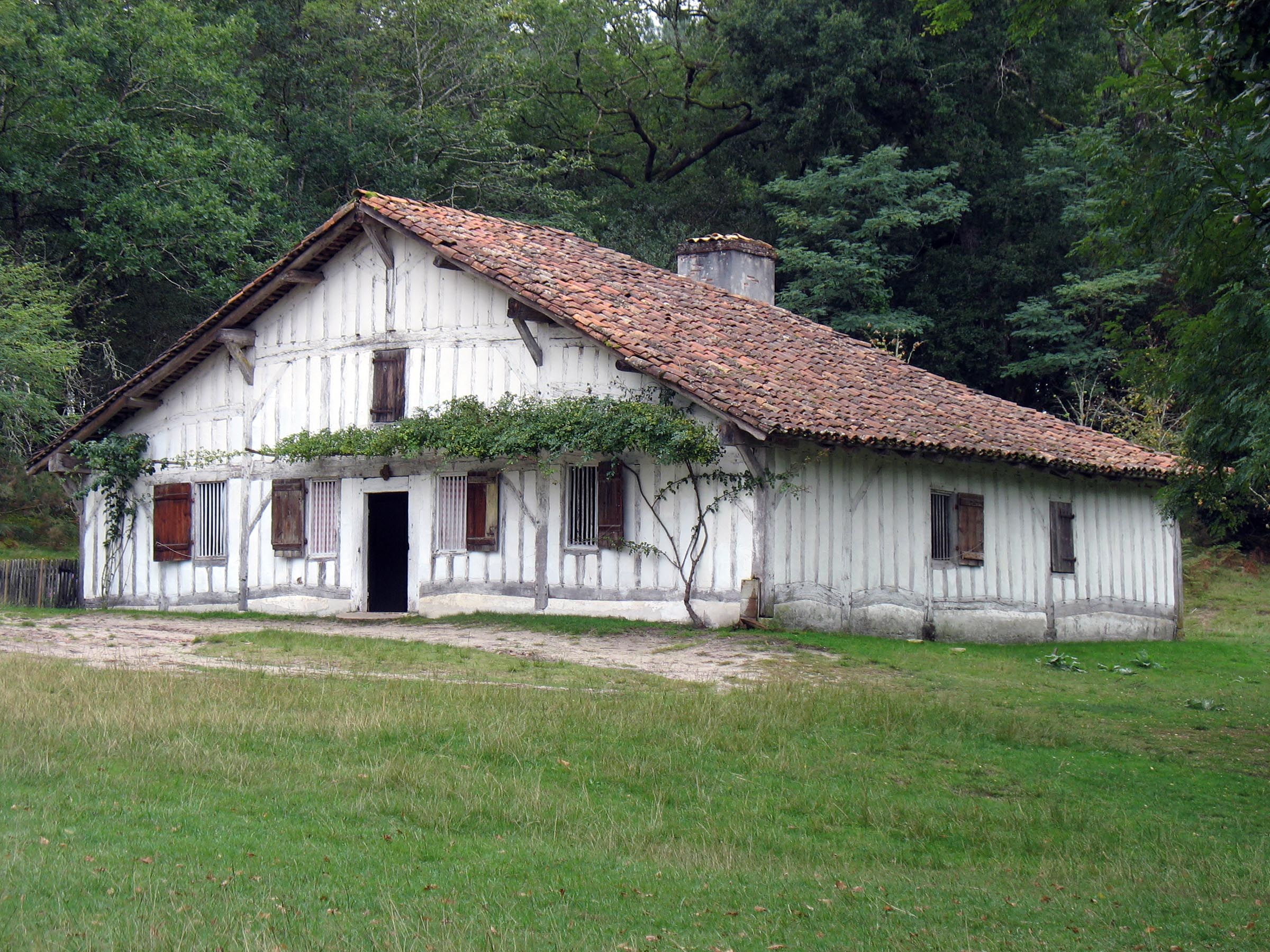
Miller's house at the Écomusée de Marquèze in Sabres, Landes

A distinction should be made between the Landes department and the Landes de Gascogne region. The first corresponds to an administrative entity and the second to a natural and cultural region. For example, Chalosse, Tursan and Marsan are part of the Landes department, while they are excluded from the Landes de Gascogne. Conversely, the Landes forest extends in the east as far as Lot-et-Garonne, reaches the Adour river in the south and extends north to Soulac in the Médoc.

The Landes de Gascogne, a natural region united by historical, geological, biological, linguistic and cultural links, are divided into three administrative entities: the departments of Gironde, Landes and Lot-et-Garonne.

When the departments were created during the French Revolution, they did not listen to the wishes of a certain Simon (Elder), a surveyor, who wanted to form a homogeneous department that respected several centuries of history, which would have been baptized Leyre. The prefecture would have been based in Lugos, renamed "Lugôville" for the occasion. Simon (Elder) defended this idea for decades. In addition, no attention was paid to the future bishop of Bayonne, François Gieure, when he demanded that the "odious appellation" be changed from the "Landes department" to the fairer "Adour department". Yet it was a strange marriage that the French Revolution celebrated: the marriage of the Chalosse hills with the Landes desert.

Soon the dividing line between Landais and non-Landais no longer passed as it had always done between the plain and the hills, the black sand and the fertile soil, it simply followed the dotted lines of the departmental maps. While the peasants of the south of Adour were transformed into Landais, the inhabitants of Salles and Saint-Symphorien became unnamed individuals, pale Girondins.

== Sub-regions of the Landes de Gascogne ==
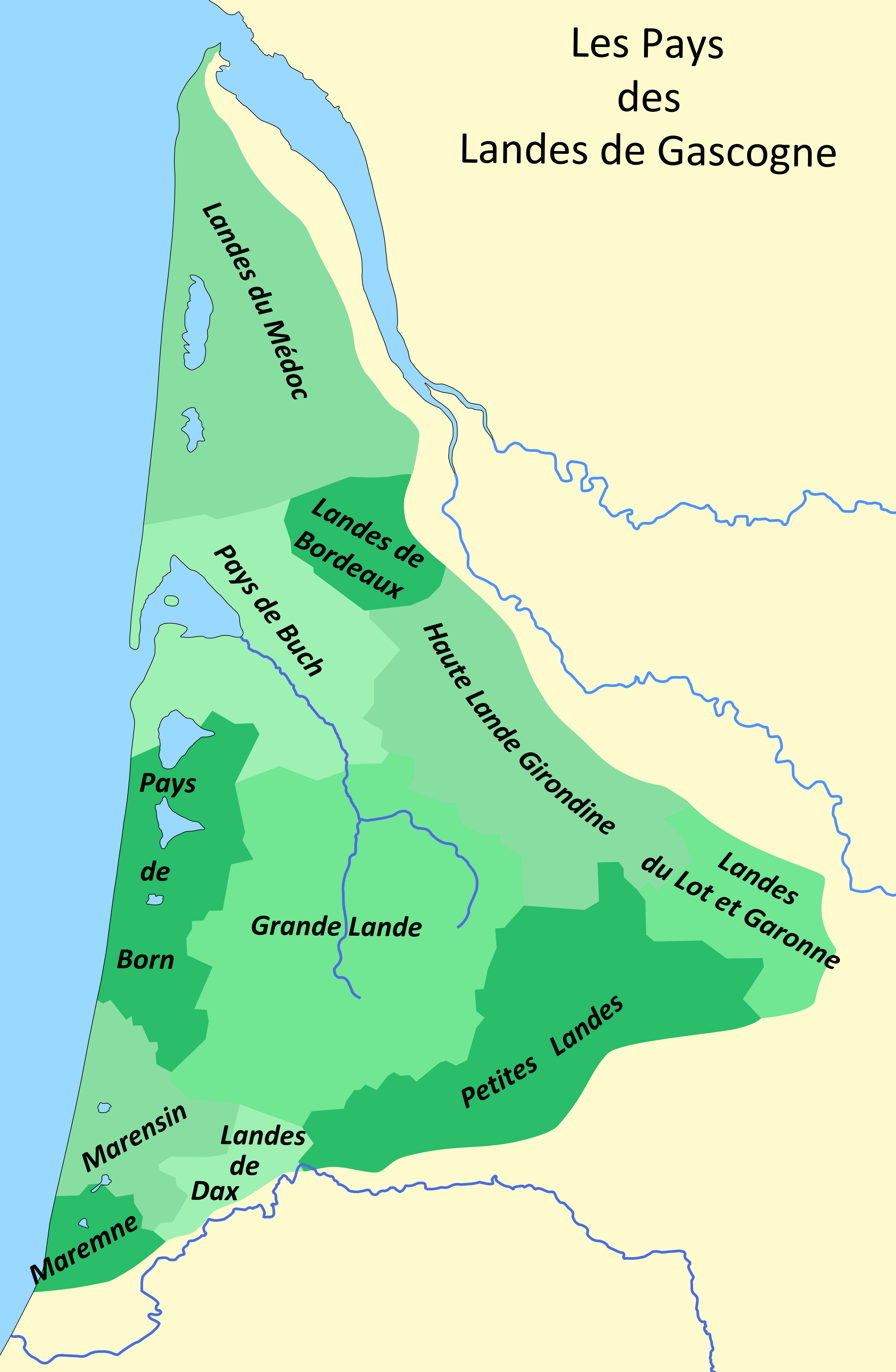
Map of sub-regions of the Landes de Gascogne

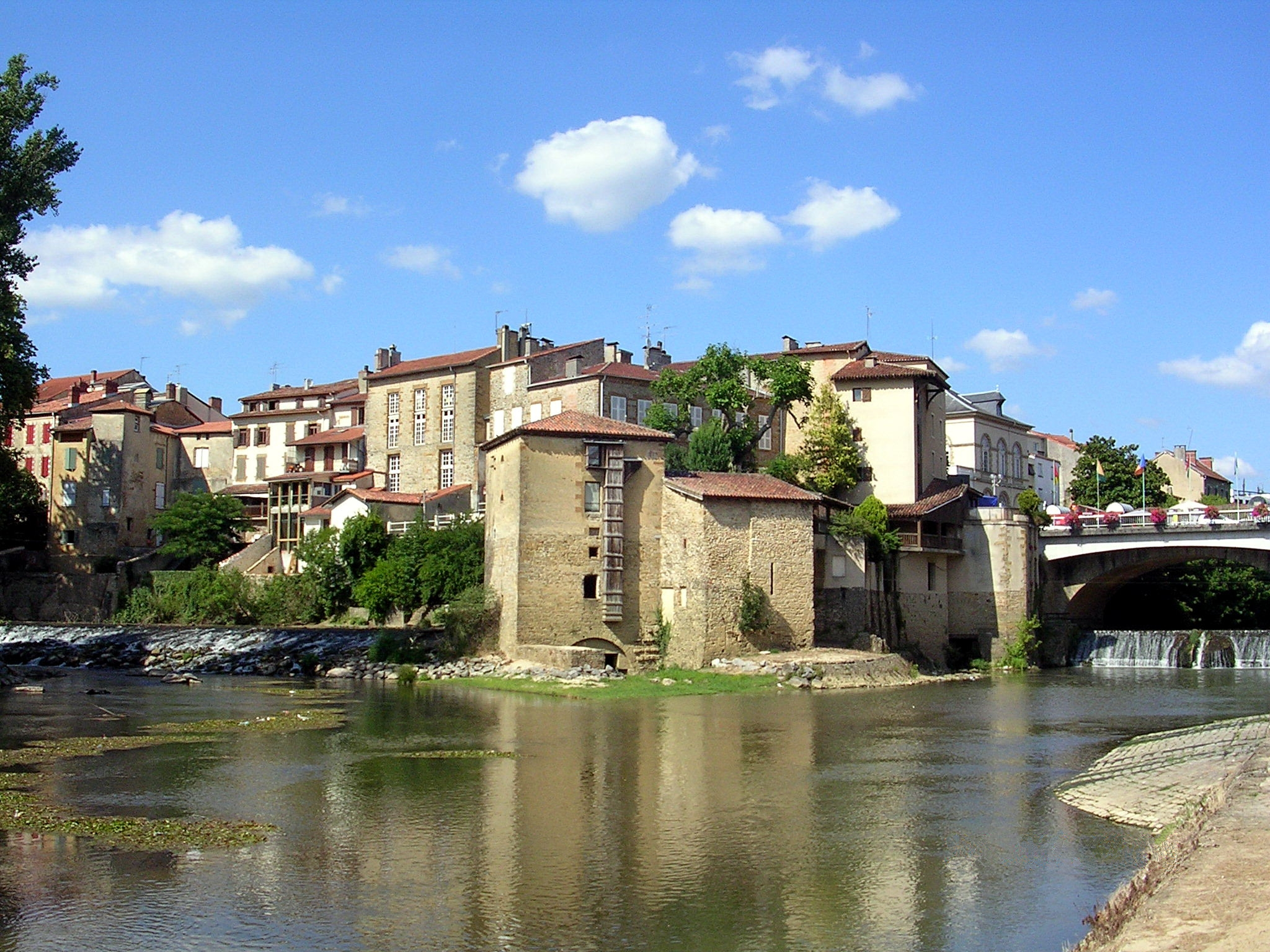
Confluence of the rivers Douze and Midou in Mont-de-Marsan

The vast triangle from Soulac-sur-Mer (Gironde) to Capbreton (Landes department) via Nérac (Lot-et-Garonne) that constitutes the Landes de Gascogne territory, is divided into several small "pays", or sub-regions. These are united by historical and geographical links, and also geological because they all belong to the sandy plain of the Landes, biological through the Landes Forest, linguistic (the vernacular is the Gascon language) and cultural (they all belong to Gascony).

When the departments of France were created on 4 March 1790 in application of the law of 22 December 1789, the Landes de Gascogne were divided into three departments:

- Gironde (Landes de Bordeaux, Landes du Médoc...)
- Landes
- Lot-et-Garonne (Landes de Lot-et-Garonne)

This new division brought together heterogeneous groups that before had no common link, such as the south of the Landes forest and Chalosse in the Landes department, and the north of the Landes forest and the Entre-Deux-Mers in Gironde. The consequences of this separation are the origin of much confusion over the presence of the Landes forest in Gironde. Landes traditions tend to disappear and people tend to associate, wrongly, the Landes de Gascogne with the Landes department.

Enhancement of the local heritage in this western part of the Gironde has focused for many years on seaside activities and the wine-growing activity of the eastern fringe of the Médoc. However, we are witnessing a gradual reversal of this tendency to forget, and more and more tourist books and maps are integrating this Landes cultural heritage into the Landes Girondines. It is nonetheless true that the pays of the Landes de Gascogne countries are united in terms of cultural heritage. They are:

- Médoc, outside the wine region;
- Landes de Bordeaux, in contact with the Bordeaux agglomeration;
- Pays de Buch, around the Arcachon basin and the Val de l'Eyre;
- Bazadais;
- Haute-Lande-Girondine;
- Landes de Lot-et-Garonne;
- Grande Lande (or Haute Lande) divided into:
  - Albret to the east,
  - Brassenx between Maremne and Marsan;
- Petites Landes transition country between Haute-Lande and Armagnac, divided into:
  - Pays de Marsan (course of the Midouze),
  - Gabardan further east;
- Pays de Born (from Lévignacq to Sanguinet);
- Marensin (from Soustons to Linxe);
- Maremne (from the marshes of Orx to Seignosse).

== Landes de Gascogne Regional Natural Park ==
The Landes de Gascogne Regional Natural Park was created in 1976 and comprises 51 municipalities in Gironde and in the Landes department. Its missions are preservation of heritage, balanced development of economic activities, and promoting public awareness of their environment by arousing the curiosity of guests and residents. It thus supports discovery tourism. Each of its facilities offers a path to enter the history of this country and understand the charm of the Landes de Gascogne.

Located between the departments of Landes and Gironde, the park extends from Arcachon Bay to Pays de Buch, follows the valleys of the Grande Leyre and the Petite Leyre, and borders the Grande Lande. The park lodge is located in Belin-Béliet.

== Culture ==
Spoken languages:

- French: official language, spoken and understood by the entire population
- Gascon: vernacular language, still in use in rural areas

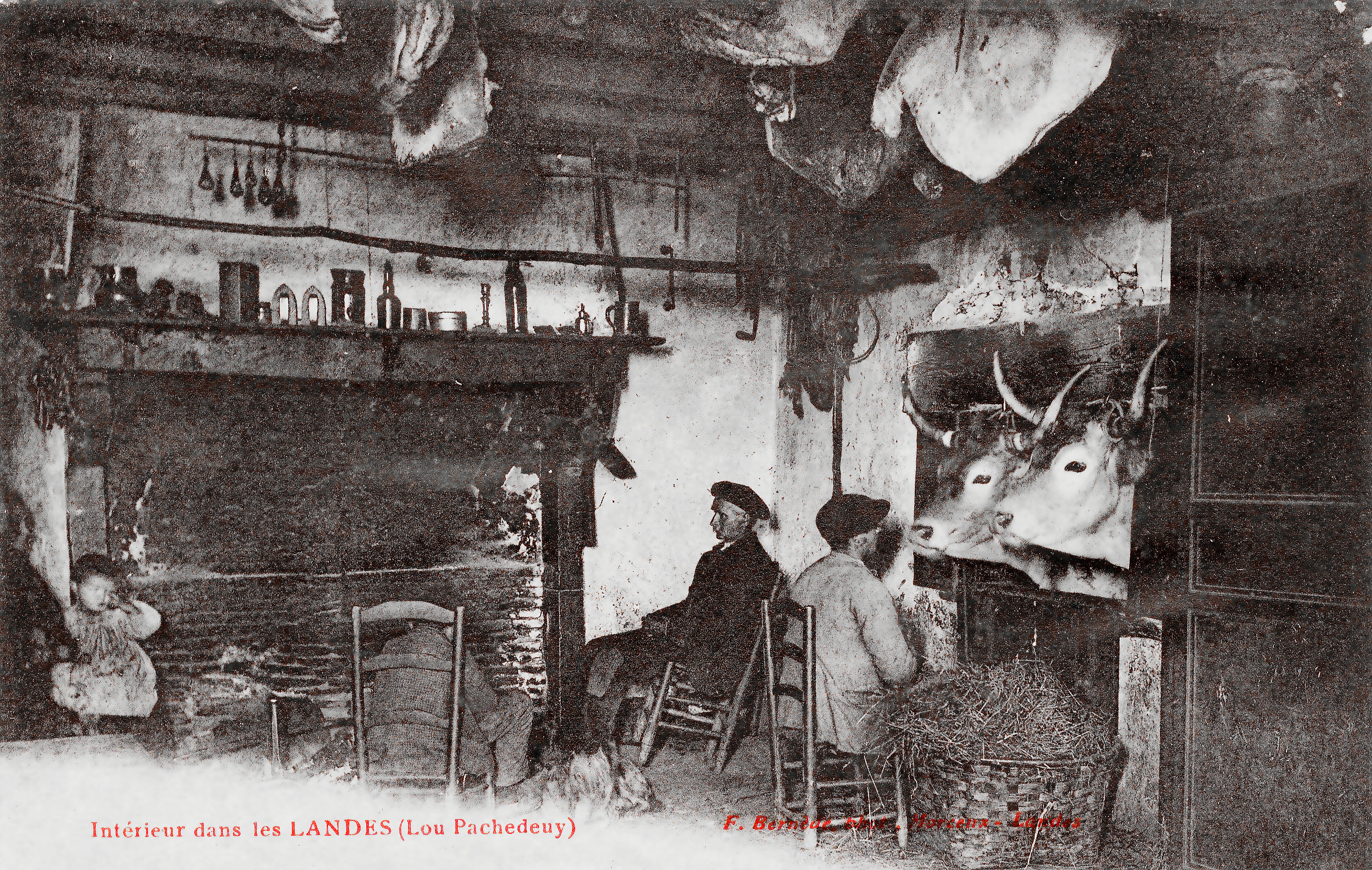
The arristoun, the two oxen fed with fodder mixed with bran

Among the local terms that may be useful to know, some Gascon words are:

- airiau / airial : space around the house where the buildings necessary for farming are located;
- alios : sandstone rock from the Landes subsoil, composed of sand (96%) bound by a cement of iron oxides and humic colloids;
- arristoun : a small opening used to feed the two oxen of the house from the large kitchen (living room);
- brana / branne : moorland, broom heather;
- craste : drainage ditch;
- estantat : frame piece supporting the awning of the houses;
- esparrou : bar, in particular for the reinforcement of cob
- hapchot : curved-billed ax used by tappers
- pinhadà / pinhadar / pignadà which means "pine forest";
- tchanques : stilts.

== Sources ==
- Aldhuy, Julien (2007), "La transformation des Landes de Gascogne, de la mise en valeur comme colonisation intérieure (xviii–xix siècles)", Sud-Ouest européen. Revue géographique des Pyrénées et du Sud-Ouest (in French) (23): 17–28
- "Arrêté du 17 décembre 1949 relatif à la constitution de la commission centrale de mise en valeur de la région des landes de Gascogne", legifrance.gouv.fr ((pp.12217-12218 of JORF)), 21 December 1949
- "Article XXXIX", 1886.u-bordeaux-montaigne.fr, pp. 412–422
- Baurein, Jacques (Abbé) (1876), Variétés bordeloises ou Essai historique et critique sur la topographie ancienne et moderne du diocèse de Bordeaux (in French), Bordeaux: Feret et fils, p. 475 (reissued Princi Negre Editor, Pau, 1999)
- Castaing, Gérard (1972), "La défense forestière contre l'incendie" (PDF), Revue forestière française (in French) (spécial), Le Fonds forestier national: 671, doi:10.4267/2042/20684
- Cherrier, Bernard; Tierchant, Hélène (2000), Landes, de pierre, d'argile et de bois (in French), Éditions Aubéron, ISBN 978-2-908650-55-6
- Doustin, Daniel (1975), "Organisation de la lutte dans le massif landais" (PDF), Revue forestière française, Les incendies de forêts (in French) (spécial): 500, doi:10.4267/2042/21018
- Dubos, Alain (2002), Les Seigneurs de la Haute Lande (roman qui décrit ses transformations économiques et sociales au xix siècle) (in French)
- Estimations pour le pin maritime, IFN
- Faure, Élodie; Galop, Didier (2011), "La fin du paradigme du désert landais : histoire de la végétation et de l'anthropisation à partir de l'étude palynologique de quelques lagunes de la Grande-Lande", Aquitania (in French): 43–59
- Jolivet (2007), "Les sols du massif forestier des Landes de Gascogne : formation, histoire, propriétés et variabilité spatiale", Revue forestière française (in French): 7–30, doi:10.4267/2042/8480, Jolivet2007
- Manciet, Bernard (2005), Le triangle des Landes (in French), Pau: Les éditions de l'atelier In8
- Maizeret, Christian (2005), Les Landes de Gascogne (in French), Paris: Delachaux et Niestlé, ISBN 978-2603013304
- Mora, Olivier (2012), Le massif des Landes de Gascogne à l'horizon 2050 (rapport de l’étude prospective) (in French), Conseil régional d’Aquitaine-INRA, p. 290
- Nougarède, Olivier (1995), Discours sur la Grande Lande, Archéologie de la constitution et de la transmission d'un patrimoine d'écrits idéologiques sur la mise en valeur des Landes de Gascogne du du XVIIIe au xxe siècle (in French), Ivry: INRA, p. 288
- "Ordonnance n° 45-852 du 28 avril 1945 relative à la mise en valeur de la région des landes de Gascogne", legifrance.gouv.fr (Journal officiel de la République française), 29 April 1945
- Papy, Louis (July–September 1950), "Le problème de la restauration des Landes de Gascogne", Les Cahiers d'Outre-Mer (in French), 3 (11): 231–279, doi:10.3406/caoum.1950.1688, Papy1950
- Papy, Louis (1973), "Le désert landais" (PDF), Revue géographique des Pyrénées et du Sud-Ouest (in French), 44 (2–3): 129–149, doi:10.3406/rgpso.1973.3359
- Papy, Louis (November 1977), "Les Landes de Gascogne: La maîtrise de l'eau dans la « lande humide »", Géographie rurale (in French) (95ter): 199–210, Papy1977
- Papy, Louis (1978), Les Landes de Gascogne et la côte d'Argent (in French), Toulouse: Privat
- Pottier, Aude (18 July 2010), "Les ambiguïtés du paysage forestier des Landes de Gascogne", Projets de Paysage (in French), 4, doi:10.4000/paysage.22997
- Pottier, Aude (December 2012), La forêt des Landes de Gascogne comme patrimoine naturel ? Échelles, enjeux, valeurs (PDF) (thèse de géographie, université de Pau et des Pays de l’Adour) (in French), p. 493
- Ribéreau-Gayon, Marie-Dominique (1996), "Entendre, voir, sentir, aménager: les Landes de Gascogne", Impact de l'homme sur les milieux naturels ' (PDF) (in French), Châteauneuf-de-Grasse: Éd. de Bergier, pp. 55–68, ISBN 2-9507852-7-1
- Ribéreau-Gayon, Marie-Dominique (2001), Chasseurs de traditions: l'imaginaire contemporain des Landes de Gascogne, Le regard de l'ethnologue (in French), Paris: Éd. du CTHS, p. 388, ISBN 2-7355-0447-6
- Sargos, Jacques (1997), Histoire de la forêt Landaise (in French), Bordeaux: L'Horizon chimérique
- Sargos, François (2008), Forêt des Landes de Gascogne, une nature secrète (in French), Bordeaux: éditions Sud Ouest
- Sargos, Jacques (22 November 2010), L'Esprit des Landes : Un pays raconté par l'art (in French), L'Horizon chimérique, ISBN 978-2-907202-70-1
- Simon (Aîné) (1851), "Carte du département du Leyre", Gallica (in French)
- "Sortir du marais", archeolandes.com (in French), November 2011
- Taillefer, François (1947), "La restauration de la région landaise", Revue géographique des Pyrénées et du Sud-Ouest (in French), 18–19 (3–4): 168–172, doi:10.3406/rgpso.1947.1247, Taillefer1947
