= Eyre (river) =

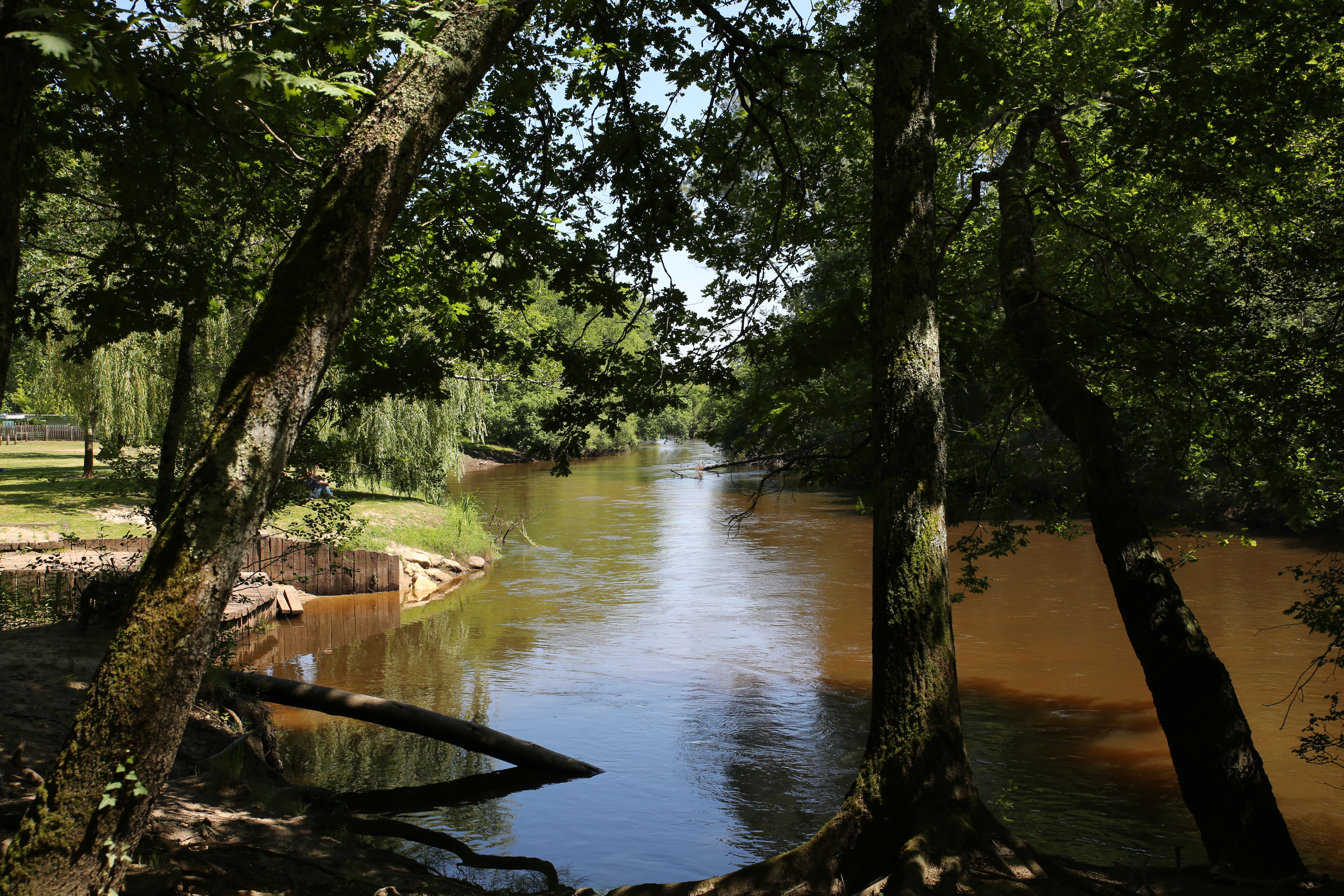

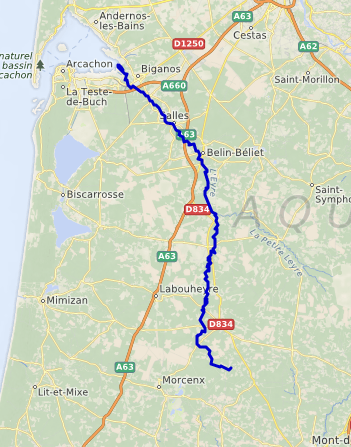
- Native name: L'Eyre (French)

Location
- Country: France

Physical characteristics
- Source
  - location: Sabres, Landes
  - elevation: 82 m (269 ft)
- Mouth
  - location: Arcachon Bay
  - coordinates: 44°39′52″N 1°1′23″W
- Length: 116 km (72 mi)
- Basin size: 1,700 km^{2} (660 mi^{2})
- Discharge
  - average: 18.8 m^{3}/s (660 cu ft/s)

Ramsar Wetland
- Official name: Bassin d'Arcachon - Secteur du delta de l'Eyre
- Designated: 27 October 2011
- Reference no.: 1996

The Eyre is a coastal river that flows through the Landes of Gascony, in Aquitaine, southwest France.

The river is generally presented as the confluence of:

- the Grande Leyre (Large Leyre), its principal course, upstream from Moustey
- the Petite Leyre (Small Leyre), its main tributary

The combined watercourse Eyre-Grande Leyre is 115.9 km (72.0 mi) long.

== Name ==
Eyre is an Aquitanian hydronym. It can be found in such names as Eyres-Moncube, Landes, or the craste de l'Eyron (Eyron ditch) in Lacanau, Gironde. Note that Leyre is a variant of the name Eyre, affected by an agglutination of the Romance article.

== Geography ==
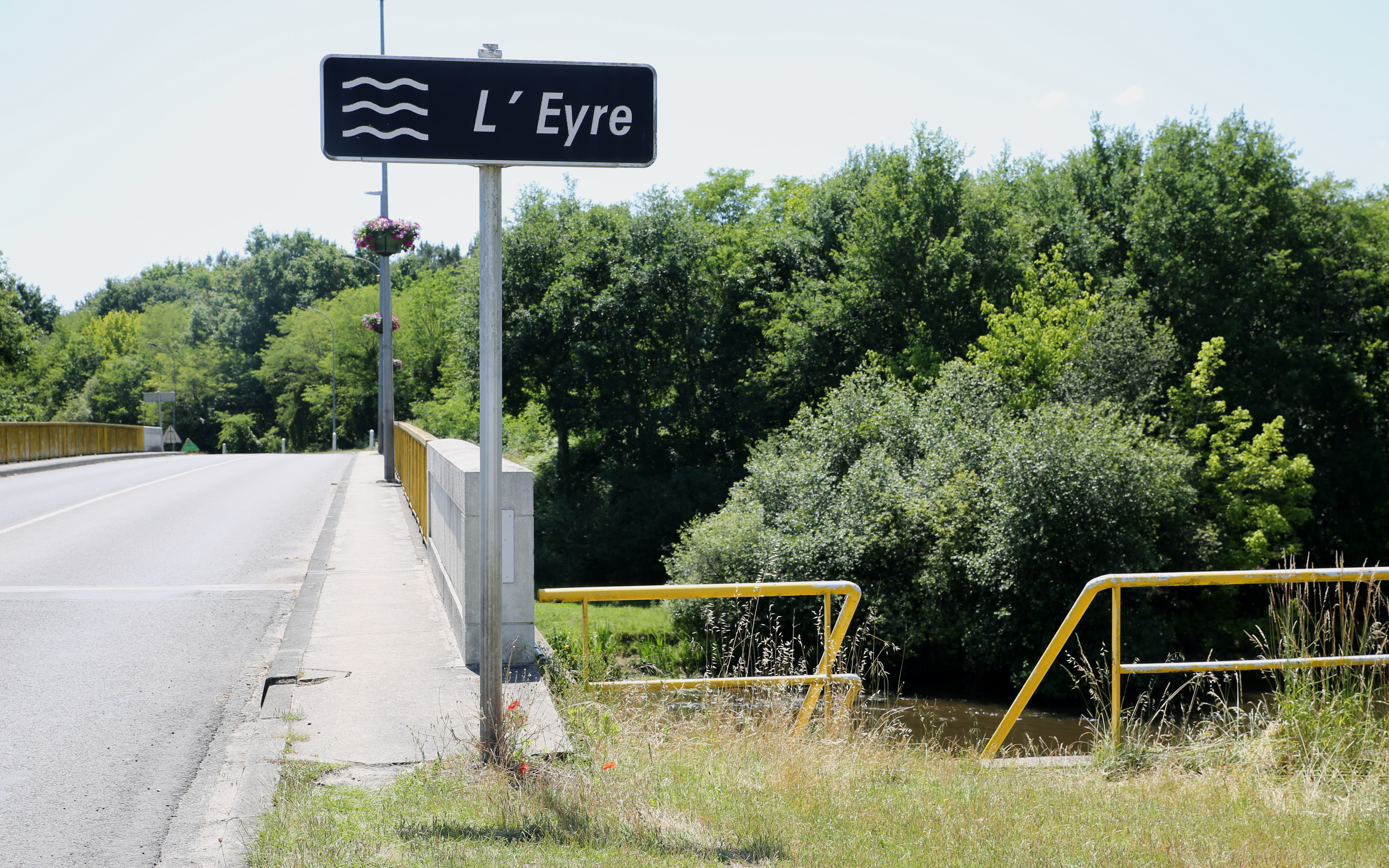
The Eyre in Mios

The basin of the Eyre in included in the Landes de Gascogne Regional Natural Park.

The river takes form in the Plantiet Marsh, in Grande Lande near Sabres, Landes.

It flows north into the Bassin d'Arcachon, a large bay on the Atlantic coast, in the Pays de Buch, Gironde. Its delta of 30 square kilometres (12 mi^{2}) contains the Le Teich ornithological park.

The Eyre flows through a preserved environment. Its banks are bordered by a broad-leaved forest. Branches join over the river, forming a gallery forest, that contrasts with the Landes forest, planted with maritime pines.

== Départements and towns ==
The Eyre flows through the following départements and towns:

- Landes: Pissos
- Gironde: Belin-Béliet, Salles, Mios, Le Teich

== Tributaries ==
The main tributary of the Eyre is the Petite-Leyre. It rises between Luxey and Retjons, in Landes, and flows northwest to join the Grande Leyre downstream from Pissos.

- (R) Petite Leyre

N.B. : (R) = right tributary; (L) = left tributary

== Historical sidenote ==
During the establishment of the French départements in 1790, the creation of a large département corresponding to the natural region of the Landes of Gascony – that is to say, today's Landes forest (then still unplanted) – was suggested. The name of this département would have been the Eyre.

== Activities ==
- Canoeing (canoes rentals)
