= Sophie Nevin =

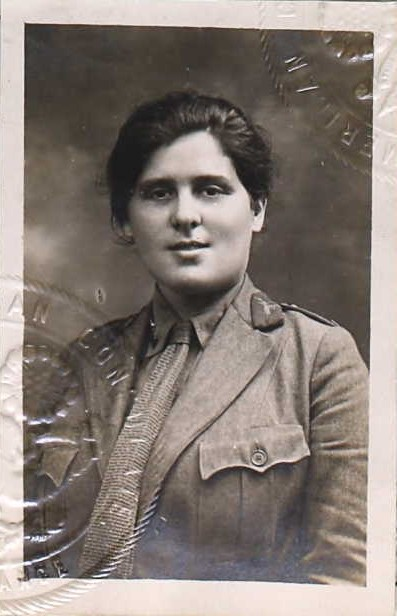
- Passport photograph from 1918
- Born: February 16, 1892; Pittsburgh, Pennsylvania
- Died: March 1959 (aged 67); Miami, Florida
- Occupation: Dentist serving overseas during WWI

Sophie Nevin (February 16, 1892 – March 1959) was an American dentist from Brooklyn, New York who volunteered with the Women's Oversea Hospitals in France during World War I.

== Family and education ==
Nevin was born on February 16, 1892, in Pittsburgh, Pennsylvania to Harris and Ciporia Nevin, both Russian immigrants to the United States. Sophie was the second born of four children with an older sister, Julia, and two younger brothers, William and Edward. The family moved to Brooklyn where her father earned a living as a builder. Nevin was educated in Brooklyn public schools. She graduated from the Manual Training High School and completed her training at the Brooklyn College of Dental and Oral Surgery in 1913.

== Service during World War I ==
Nevin volunteered to travel to France with the Women’s Oversea Hospitals, an all-woman volunteer medical unit sponsored by the National American Women’s Suffrage Association. She was anxious to support the war effort and according to an interview published in the Brooklyn Daily Eagle, she had previously offered her services to the National League for Woman’s Service with the American Ambulance Corps, as well as the American and British Red Cross.

However, with two brothers serving in the U.S. military, Nevins required special permission to obtain a passport. She traveled to France in April 1918 and joined a Women’s Oversea Hospital group that was in the process of establishing a hospital for refugees, especially women and children, in Labouheyre, near Bordeaux.

Nevin provided dental care for American soldiers while waiting for the refugee hospital to open. When she learned that the 4th Battalion, 20th Engineer Regiment stationed in Mimizan did not have a dentist, she volunteered her services to the base commander Brigadier General William S. Scott. Although Scott was in favor of accepting her service, the base surgeon Colonel A. Shaw declined indicating that the “available Army dental surgeons in the area were ‘adequate’ to furnish all necessary dental care for the regiment."

Nevins married an engineering officer, Captain Edwin C. Wemple (1885-1937) in Bordeaux, France on August 22, 1918. She applied for a passport under her new name in September 1918 and returned to New York in October of that year.

== Life after World War I ==
Nevin joined her husband, Edwin C. Wemple, who was working in California after the war. Their son, Jay Nevin Wemple was born in 1923. It appears that the couple separated and divorced at some point. By 1925 Nevins had returned to her parents’ home in Brooklyn and Wemple remarried in 1930.

Nevin was living with her sister in Los Angeles in 1940 when she attended an American Legion convention in Boston. A Boston newspaper recognized her leadership in organizing California women in a national defense program and supporting the re-election of Franklin D. Roosevelt.

Nevin died in Florida in 1959 at the age of 67.
