= Bernat Manciet =

Occitan author

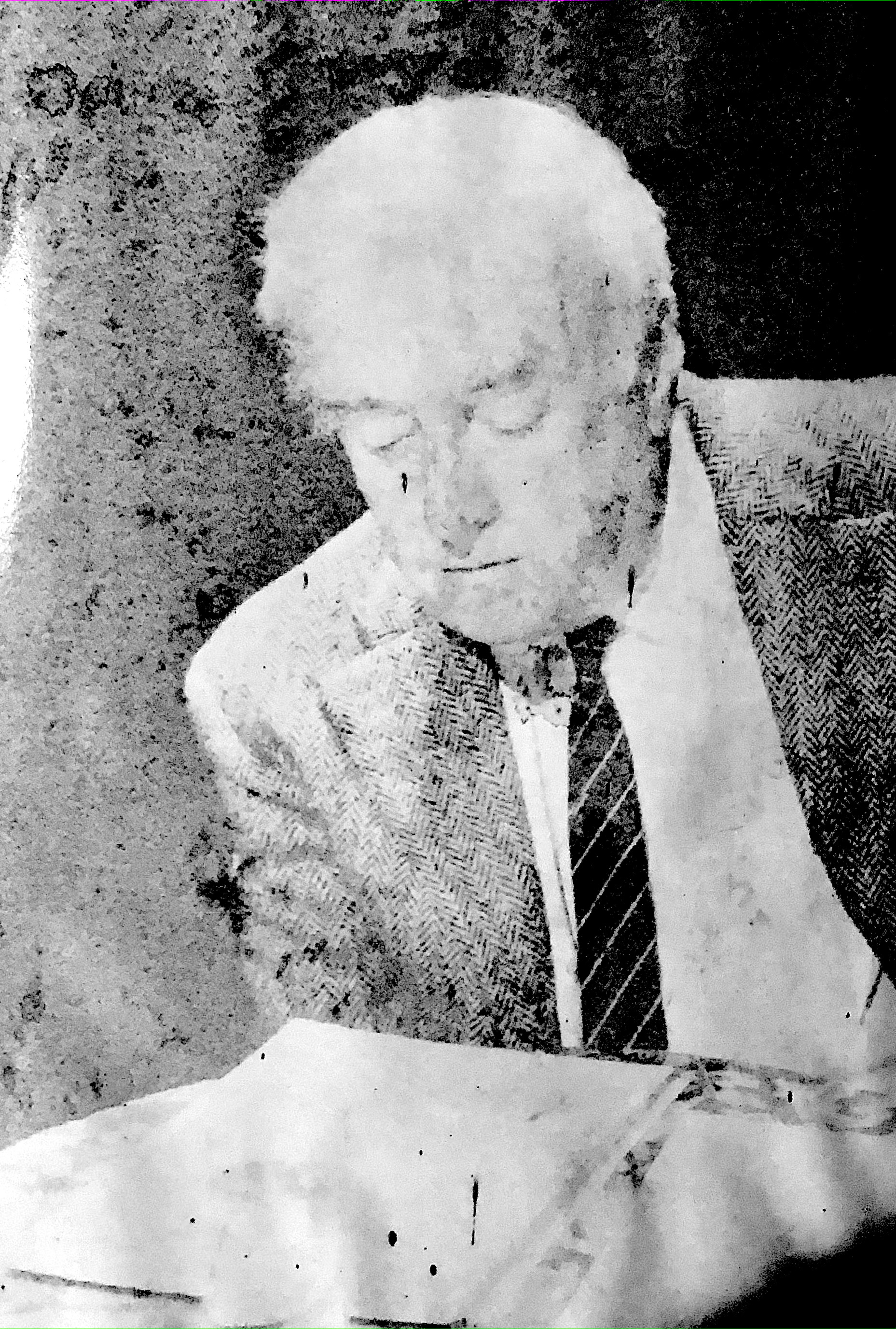

Bernat Manciet (Occitan: [beɾˈnad manˈsjet]; 27 September 1923, Sabres, Landes, France – 3 June 2005, Mont-de-Marsan) was a famous Occitan author.

== Biography ==
Manciet attended school first in his native Sabres and then spent three years in the lycée of Talence where he lived at his uncles', who were priests. They taught him Latin and Ancient Greek. He went on to sit his baccalauréat in Bordeaux on a Sunday of June, 1940. His education provided him with an incredible erudition that transpired from his every phrase. As World War II broke out, Manciet started studying literature and political sciences.

This is how he became a diplomat with Marie-Pierre Kœnig, who was a high commissioner in Germany at a time when the defeated nation was trying to rebuild itself. He also took part in the Nuremberg Trials. In 1955, his diplomatic career led him to such places as Brazil and Montevideo in Uruguay, from where his acute geopolitical skills probably sprang. Back in the Landes, he wed, fathered five children and ran his step-family's company, only for it to go bankrupt after ten years.

Bernat Manciet managed Òc magazine but always refused to side with such Occitan activists as Robèrt Lafont and Max Roqueta, with whom he nonetheless was quite friendly.

== Literary career ==
A poet, a novelist, a playwright, an essayist, a literary review director, an artist... Bernat Manciet also came on stage to recite his poems and even took part in shows alongside Bernard Lubat in Uzeste.

In 1972 already, Renat Nelli wrote about Manciet in a bilingual collection of poems called La Poésie occitane (published by Seghers):

"One won't have long to wait before an overall study of Manciet's work is made. Maybe it will help understand better this giant of originality, whose unremitting literary renewal and lyrical intimate spring have no cause to be jealous of the latest Parisian trends. With René Char and Salvatore Quasimodo, Bernat Manciet is undoubtedly one of the great and underrated poets of modern Europe."

== Bibliography ==
- Le Triangle des Landes (1981)
- L'Enterrament a Sabres (1996)
- Accidents (1955)
- Le Jeune homme de novembre / Lo Gojat de noveme (1995)
- Les Émigrants or Iphigénie devant la gare (1999)
- Cobalt (2002)
- De nouveau Cordoue / Cordoa enqüèra (2004)
- Casaus perduts (2005)
- Jardins perdus (2005)
- Les Murmures du mal (2006)
- Lo Brèc (2006)
