= Landes forest =

Historic natural region of Aquitane, France

Landes forest French: 'La forêt des Landes' Occitan: 'las Lanas de Gasconha'
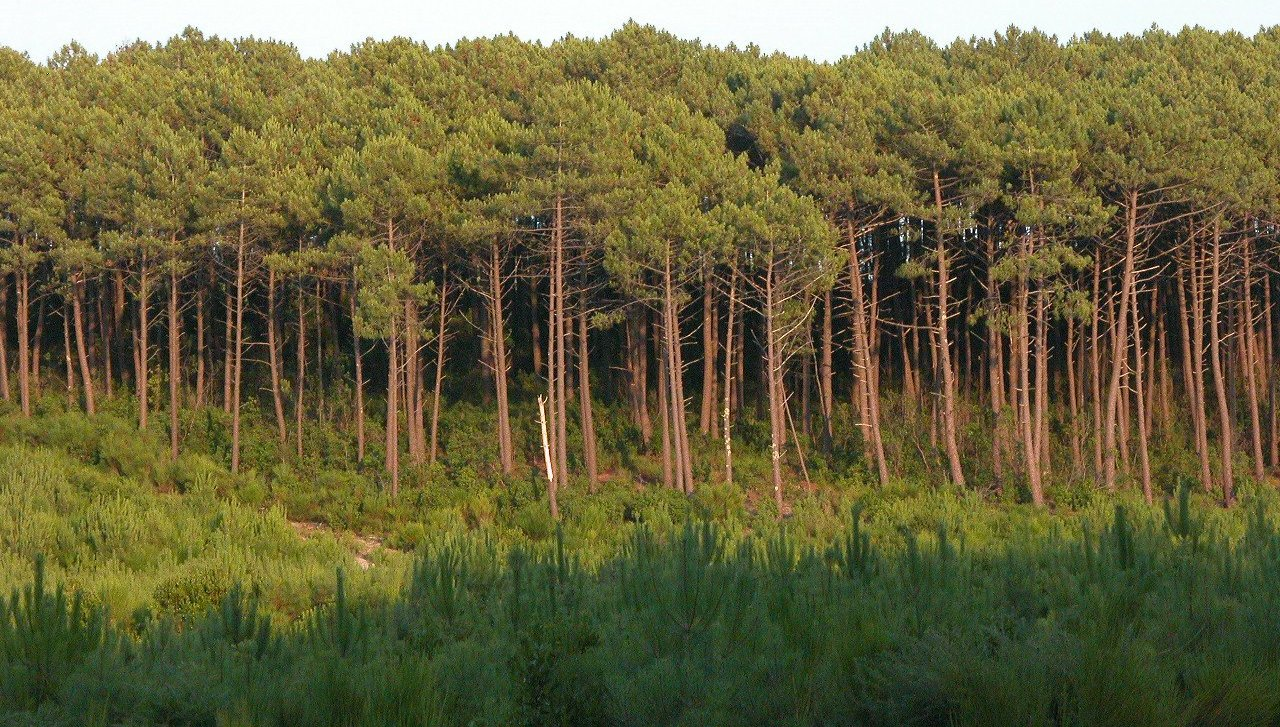
- A stand of Pinus pinaster

- Location within France

Geography
- Location: Landes, Gironde, and Lot-et-Garonne départements, Nouvelle-Aquitaine, France
- Coordinates: 44°10′48″N 0°34′56″W
- Elevation: 0 metres (0 ft)
- Area: 10,000 km^{2} (3,900 sq mi)

Administration
- Status: Private
- Established: 19 June 1857 (19 June 1857 law)
- Authority: Multiple private

Ecology
- WWF Classification: Atlantic mixed forests
- Disturbance: Wildfire, Windthrow, Logging
- Dominant tree species: Maritime pine

The Landes forest (pronounced [lɑ̃d]; La forêt des Landes in French) in the Landes de Gascogne (las Lanas de Gasconha in the Gascon language), in the historic Gascony natural region of southwestern France now known as Aquitaine, is the largest man-made woodland in Western Europe. The French word landes and Gascon lanas mean 'moors' or 'heaths', from Transalpine Gaulish *landa ("uninhabited/uncultivated area"); compare Irish lann, Welsh llan (“enclosure”).

== Geography ==
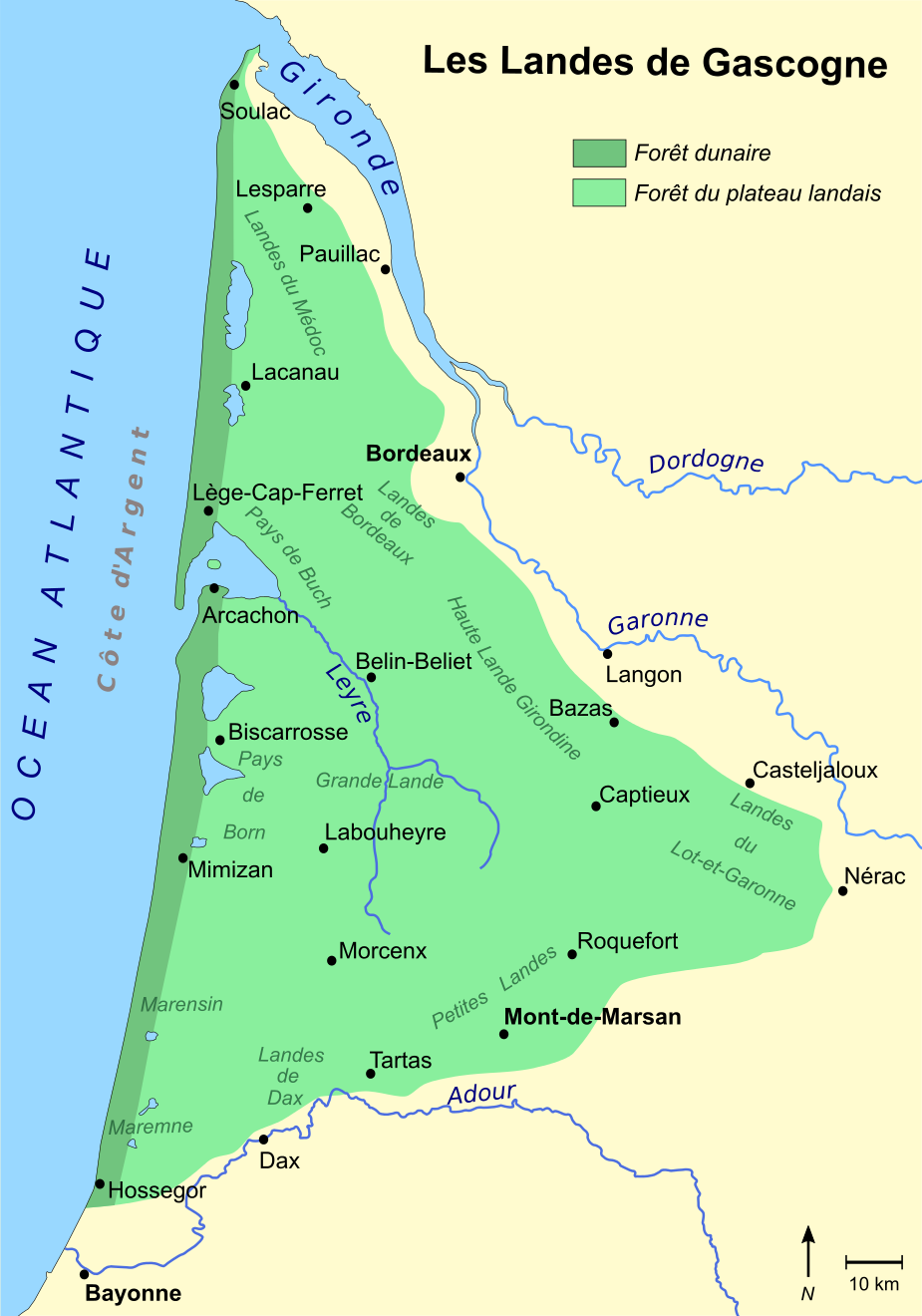
Map of Landes of Gascony.

The forest (also known as the 'moors of Gascony', and formerly, the 'moors of Bordeaux') covers a large portion of Landes and Gironde, two of the departments of France; it also spills over into parts of the Lot-et-Garonne department. The sources of several rivers can be found in this region, including the sources of the Leyre, the Boudigau, the Ciron, and the Gat Mort. The largest towns within the forest are Arcachon, Dax, and Mont-de-Marsan.

== Origin as a pine plantation ==
The forest is composed mostly of maritime pine, Pinus pinaster. Unlike many other European forests, the Landes forest is almost entirely created and managed by man for industrial purposes. This massive pine plantation was started in the 18th century in the Pays de Buch area of Gironde, to halt erosion and cleanse the soil.

== History ==
Most of the region now occupied by the Landes forest was swampy land that was sparsely inhabited until the 19th century, when the 19 June 1857 law ended traditional pastoralism and led to wide scale reforestation, in order to rehabilitate the landscape and provide for regional economic development. Prior to this period, the people of the Landes used stilt-walking to move from place to place in the wet terrain. Since the 1970s, parts of the forest have given way to intensive agriculture (in particular, grain farming.)

The area of the forest is estimated to be around 10,000 square kilometres (3,900 sq mi), of which nine-tenths is exclusively devoted to a monoculture of maritime pines (Pinus pinaster), but, in the centre of this pinhadar (pine plantation in the Gascon dialect of Occitan), there is a natural forest that survives from the post-glacial timbering of this part of southwestern France. There, pines co-exist with other species, chiefly oak, alder, birch, willow, and holly. This mixed temperate forest is most commonly found along watercourses, where the drainage is particularly good. The old-growth forest was probably more extensive prior to the Middle Ages, when a colder, more humid, climate took hold and changed the species composition. Because of the need for wood for fuel and construction, and because of a steady expansion in the grazing of sheep, the aboriginal forest was further depleted between the 15th and 18th centuries.

A major storm in January 2009 damaged approximately 300,000 hectares (740,000 acres) of forest, 90% of which was located in the Landes Forest.

== Agriculture and industry ==
Before the mid-19th century, only the breeding of sheep on the moors (and the production of sheep manure as a soil amendment) allowed the cultivation of rye. Because of wet winters, it was necessary to top-dress the land with thatch to preserve it for the next growing season. The disappearance of the moors, because of the expansion of the pine plantations, brought about the end of this herding and wetland grain-growing culture, and the iconic image of shepherds on stilts disappeared as well. The shepherd image was replaced by the image of the resin-collector with his tools.

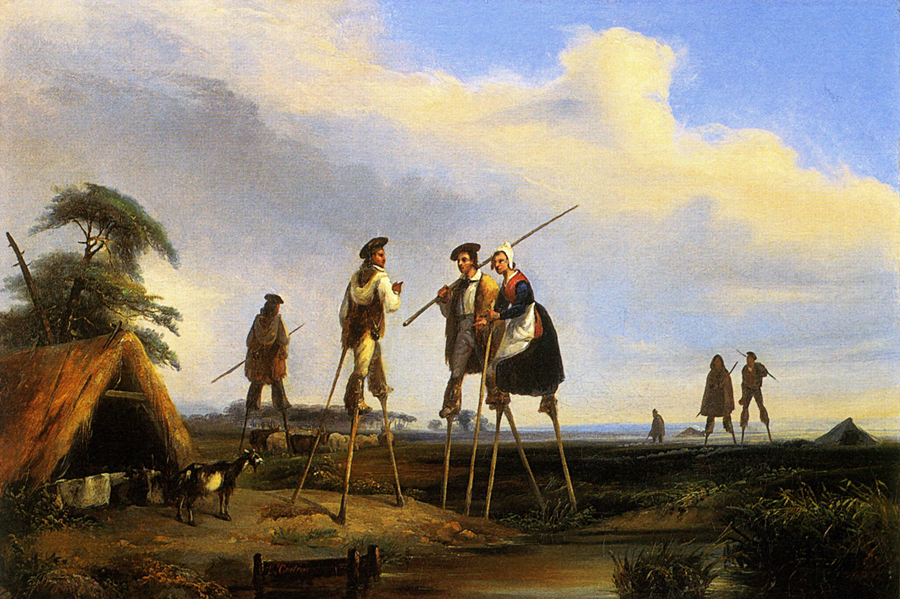
Jean-Louis Gintrac (1808–1886), Inhabitants of the Landes, Musée des Beaux-Arts de Bordeaux; first half 19th century; oil on canvas; 32x46 cm.

In the first part of the 20th century, extensive commercial exploitation of wood, paper, and pine resin began, and these industries became an important part of the regional economy. Many local people are still employed in forest-related pursuits, including forestry, sawmills, paper mills, woodcrafts like parquetry and joinery and furniture making, as well the fabrication of paper-based products like cardboard and fiberboard for construction. However, resin-collecting, which required hard labor, has almost completely disappeared because modern chemical processes for producing solvents and other useful chemicals often do not rely on pine resin or pine tar as a precursor. DRT is the largest company in this region that uses the byproducts of pine exploitation.

== See also ==
- Voies Ferrées des Landes (VFL), grouping of railway companies operating in the forest.
- Parc naturel régional des Landes de Gascogne

== Sources ==
This article is based on a translation from the original French Wikipedia article as it appeared on 11 November 2006, which cites the following sources:

- Francis Dupuy, Le pin de la discorde: Les rapports de métayage dans la Grande Lande, Paris, Maison des Sciences de l'Homme, 1996
- François Sargos, "Forêt des landes de Gascogne, une nature secrète" Editions Sud Ouest, Bordeaux, 2008
- Christian Maizeret, Les Landes de Gascogne, Delachaux et Niestlé, Paris, 2005
- Jacques Sargos, Histoire de la Forêt landaise - Du désert à l'âge d'or, Bordeaux, L'horizon chimérique, 1997, rééd. en 2004.
- Massif des Landes de Gascogne - Inventaire forestier 1998 1999 2000, IFN
- L'Ours Pécheur, de Philippe Cougrand. Bordeaux: Pleine Page Editeur, 2008, 312 p. (collection Rouge nuit). ISBN 978-2-913406-58-2
