= 19 June 1857 law =

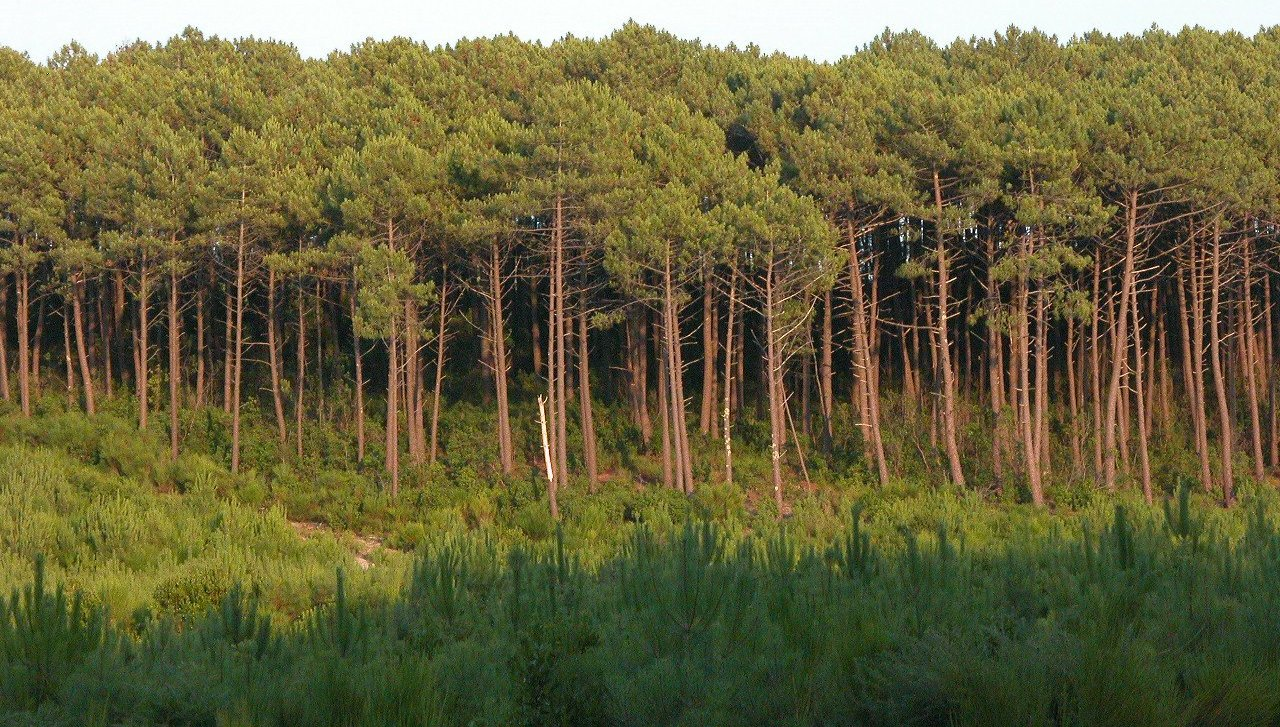
The Landes forest at La Teste-de-Buch

The 19 June 1857 law, also called loi relative à l'assainissement et de mise en culture des Landes de Gascogne (Law related to sanitation and culture of the Landes de Gascogne), was a turning point in the Landes history: it was the end of traditional pastoralism, the disappearance of the Landes shepherd, and the beginning of the extension of the Landes forest on the major part of the territory, leading to the generalization of resin extraction in the region.
