= Retjons =

- Commune
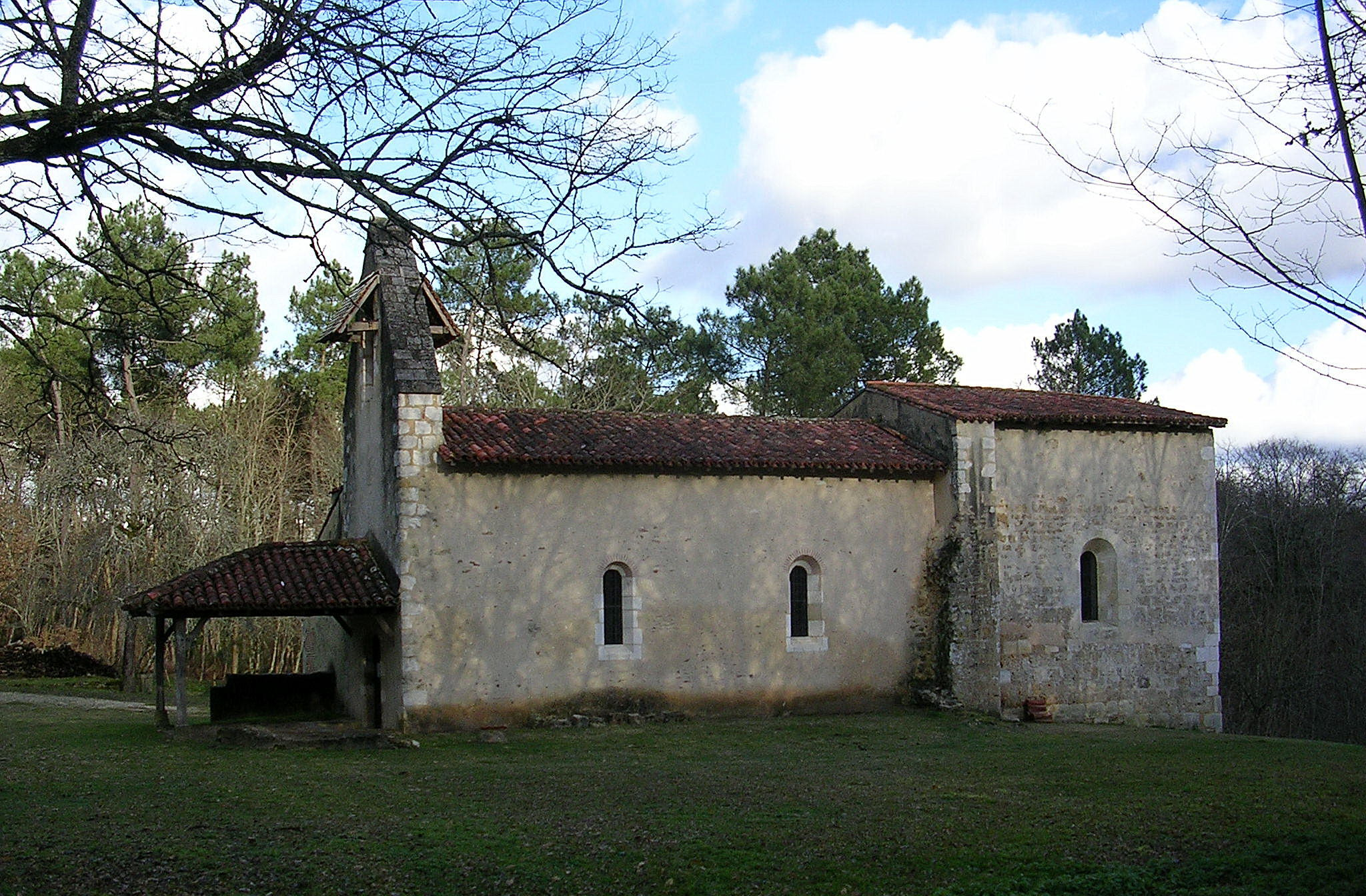
- Chapel of Lugaut in Retjons
- Location of Retjons
- Location within France Location within Nouvelle-Aquitaine
- Coordinates: 44°06′13″N 0°17′39″W
- Country: France
- Region: Nouvelle-Aquitaine
- Department: Landes
- Arrondissement: Mont-de-Marsan
- Canton: Haute Lande Armagnac

Government
  - Mayor (2021–2026): Virginie Clave
- Area^{1}: 77.84 km^{2} (30.05 sq mi)
- Highest elevation: 134 m (440 ft)
- Lowest elevation: 68 m (223 ft)
- Population (2023): 301
  - Density: 3.87/km^{2} (10.0/sq mi)
- Time zone: UTC+01:00 (CET)
  - Summer (DST): UTC+02:00 (CEST)
- INSEE/Postal code: 40164 /40120
- ^{1} French Land Register data, which excludes lakes, ponds, glaciers > 1 km^{2} (0.386 sq mi or 247 acres) and river estuaries.

Retjons (French pronunciation: [ʁɛdʒɔ̃]; Occitan: Tornem, before 1953: Lugaut-Retjons) is a commune in the Landes department in Nouvelle-Aquitaine in southwestern France.

== Population ==
Historical population
Year	Pop.	±% p.a.
1968	439	—
1975	369	−2.45%
1982	297	−3.05%
1990	313	+0.66%
1999	276	−1.39%
2007	331	+2.30%
2012	327	−0.24%
2017	350	+1.37%
2023	301	−2.48%
Source: INSEE

== See also ==
- Communes of the Landes department
