= Pissos =

- Commune
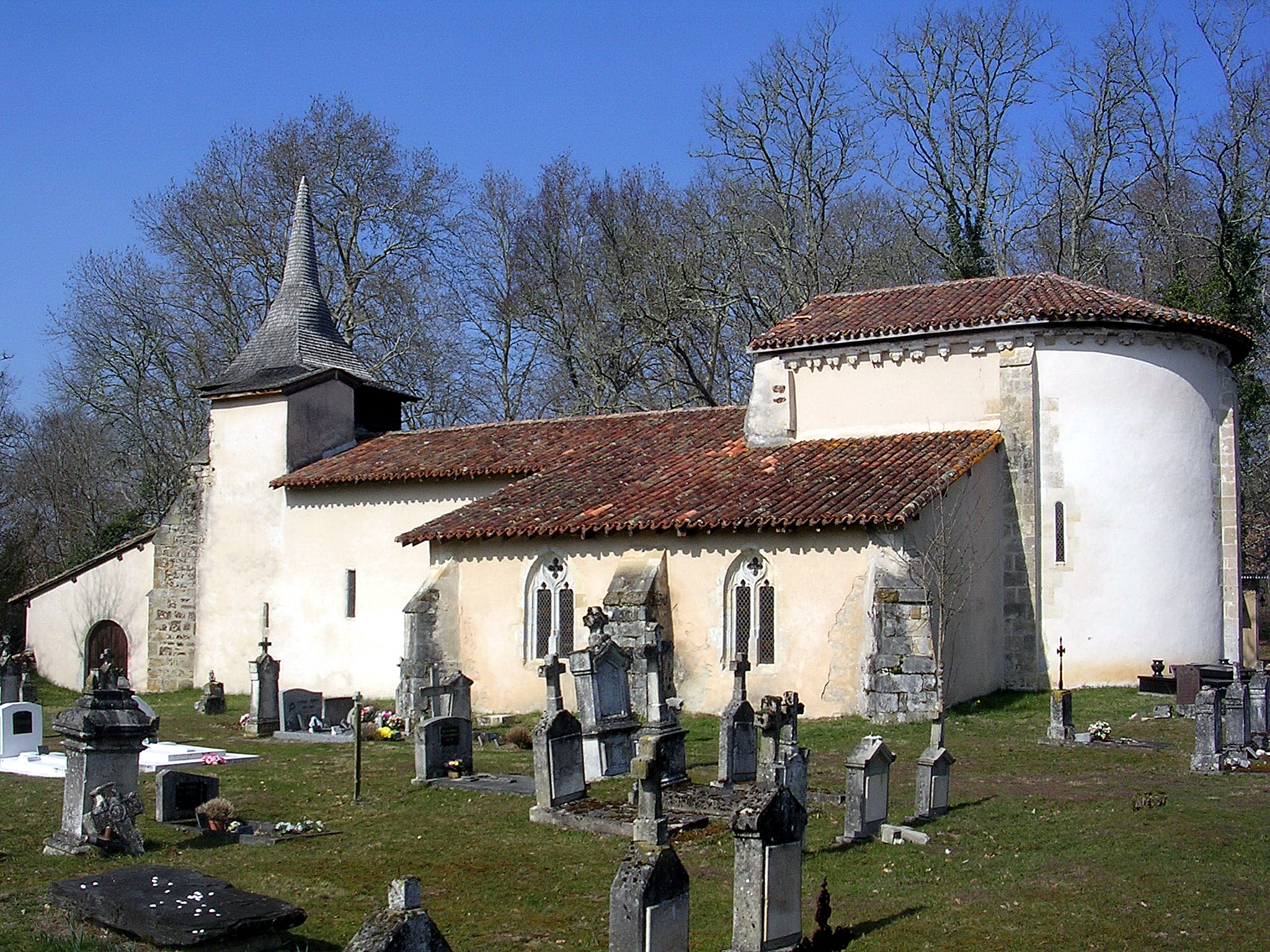
- Church of Saint-Jean-Baptiste of Richet (a hamlet within Pissos)
- Location of Pissos
- Location within France Location within Nouvelle-Aquitaine
- Coordinates: 44°18′36″N 0°46′38″W
- Country: France
- Region: Nouvelle-Aquitaine
- Department: Landes
- Arrondissement: Mont-de-Marsan
- Canton: Grands Lacs

Government
  - Mayor (2020–2026): Denis Saintorens
- Area^{1}: 140.75 km^{2} (54.34 sq mi)
- Elevation: 58 m (190 ft)
- Highest elevation: 79 m (259 ft)
- Lowest elevation: 30 m (98 ft)
- Population (2023): 1,505
  - Density: 10.69/km^{2} (27.69/sq mi)
- Time zone: UTC+01:00 (CET)
  - Summer (DST): UTC+02:00 (CEST)
- INSEE/Postal code: 40227 /40410
- ^{1} French Land Register data, which excludes lakes, ponds, glaciers > 1 km^{2} (0.386 sq mi or 247 acres) and river estuaries.

Pissos (French pronunciation: [pisɔs]; Occitan: Pissòs) is a commune in the Landes department in Nouvelle-Aquitaine in south-western France.

The commune is known for having the highest ambient temperature on Météo-France records since 1947 during the 2026 European heatwaves, reaching a temperature of 44.3 °C (111.7 °F) on June 23.

== Population ==
Historical population
Year	Pop.	±% p.a.
1968	908	—
1975	809	−1.64%
1982	834	+0.44%
1990	970	+1.91%
1999	1,097	+1.38%
2007	1,237	+1.51%
2012	1,378	+2.18%
2017	1,441	+0.90%
2023	1,505	+0.73%
Source: INSEE

== See also ==
- Communes of the Landes department
- Parc naturel régional des Landes de Gascogne
