= Labouheyre =

Labouheyre La Bohèira (Occitan)
- Commune
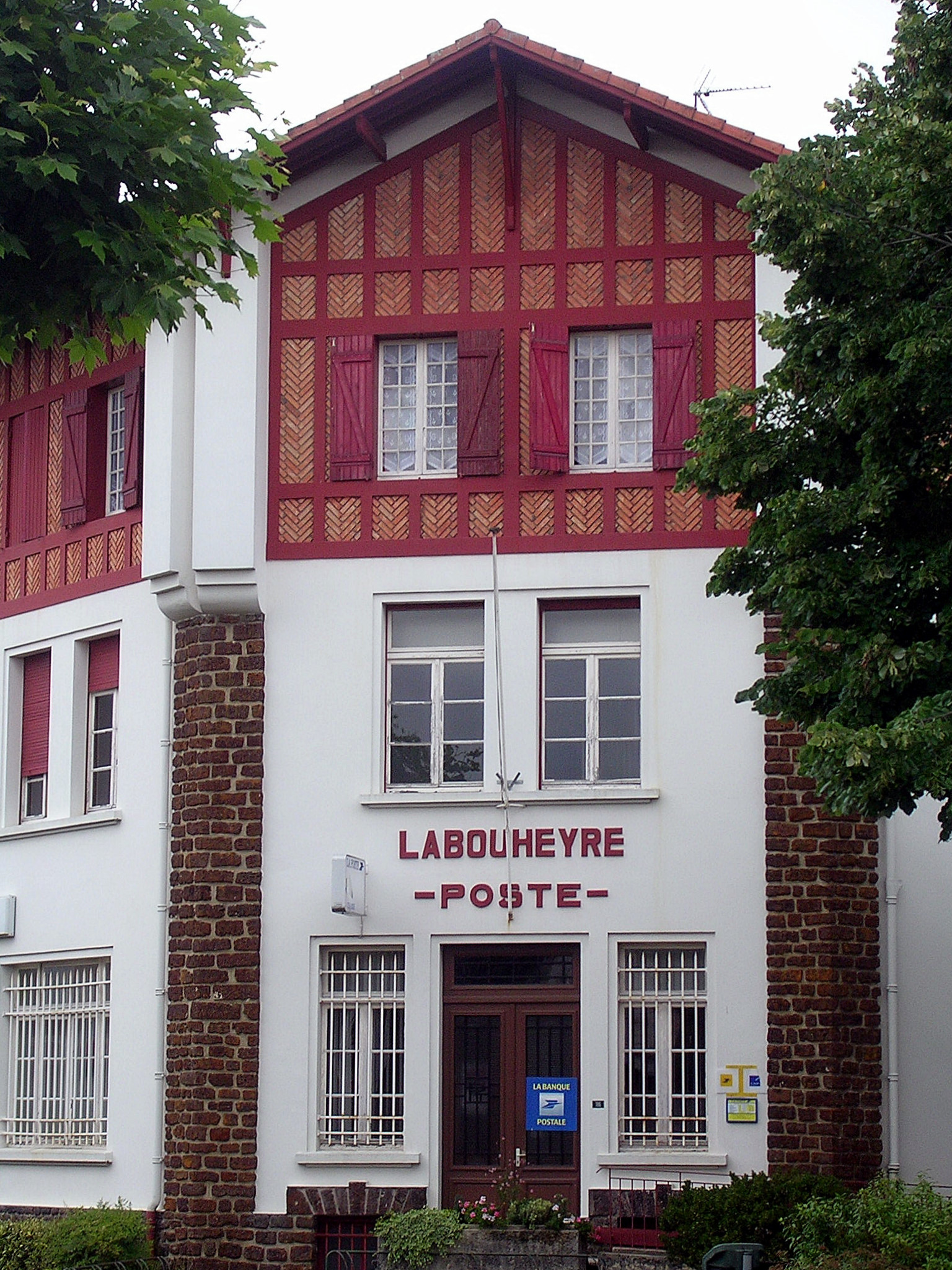
- The post office in Labouheyre

- Coat of arms
- Location of Labouheyre
- Location within France Location within Nouvelle-Aquitaine
- Coordinates: 44°12′48″N 0°55′05″W
- Country: France
- Region: Nouvelle-Aquitaine
- Department: Landes
- Arrondissement: Mont-de-Marsan
- Canton: Haute Lande Armagnac
- Intercommunality: Cœur Haute Lande

Government
  - Mayor (2020–2026): Jean-Louis Pédeuboy
- Area^{1}: 36.13 km^{2} (13.95 sq mi)
- Elevation: 76 m (249 ft)
- Highest elevation: 84 m (276 ft)
- Lowest elevation: 57 m (187 ft)
- Population (2023): 2,906
  - Density: 80.43/km^{2} (208.3/sq mi)
- Time zone: UTC+01:00 (CET)
  - Summer (DST): UTC+02:00 (CEST)
- INSEE/Postal code: 40134 /40210
- ^{1} French Land Register data, which excludes lakes, ponds, glaciers > 1 km^{2} (0.386 sq mi or 247 acres) and river estuaries.

Labouheyre (French pronunciation: [labu.ɛjʁ]; Occitan: La Bohèira) is a commune in the Landes department in Nouvelle-Aquitaine in south-western France.

== Population ==
Historical population
Year	Pop.	±% p.a.
1968	2,314	—
1975	2,649	+1.95%
1982	2,849	+1.05%
1990	2,816	−0.15%
1999	2,534	−1.17%
2007	2,534	+0.00%
2012	2,659	+0.97%
2017	2,731	+0.54%
2023	2,906	+1.04%
Source: INSEE

== See also ==
- Communes of the Landes department
- Parc naturel régional des Landes de Gascogne
