= Sabres, Landes =

Sabres
- Commune
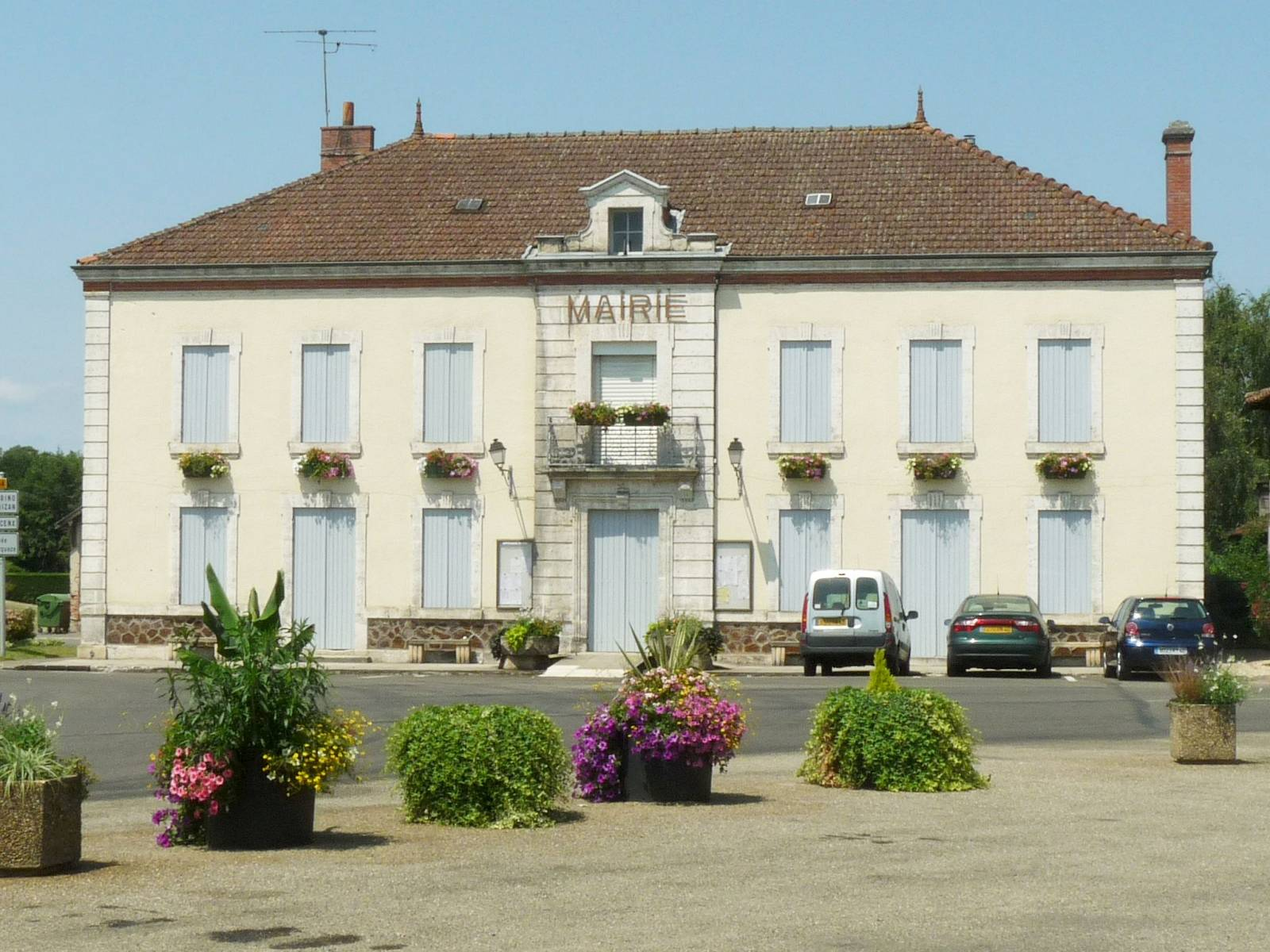
- Town hall
- Location of Sabres
- Location within France Location within Nouvelle-Aquitaine
- Coordinates: 44°08′56″N 0°44′19″W
- Country: France
- Region: Nouvelle-Aquitaine
- Department: Landes
- Arrondissement: Mont-de-Marsan
- Canton: Haute Lande Armagnac

Government
  - Mayor (2020–2026): Gérard Moreau
- Area^{1}: 160.13 km^{2} (61.83 sq mi)
- Elevation: 76 m (249 ft)
- Highest elevation: 107 m (351 ft)
- Lowest elevation: 58 m (190 ft)
- Population (2023): 1,213
  - Density: 7.575/km^{2} (19.62/sq mi)
- Time zone: UTC+01:00 (CET)
  - Summer (DST): UTC+02:00 (CEST)
- INSEE/Postal code: 40246 /40630
- ^{1} French Land Register data, which excludes lakes, ponds, glaciers > 1 km^{2} (0.386 sq mi or 247 acres) and river estuaries.

Sabres (French pronunciation: [sabʁ]; Occitan: Espadas) is a commune in the Landes department in Nouvelle-Aquitaine in southwestern France.

== Population ==
Historical population
Year	Pop.	±% p.a.
1968	1,143	—
1975	1,105	−0.48%
1982	1,058	−0.62%
1990	1,096	+0.44%
1999	1,107	+0.11%
2007	1,193	+0.94%
2012	1,205	+0.20%
2017	1,174	−0.52%
2023	1,213	+0.55%
Source: INSEE

== See also ==
- Communes of the Landes department
- Parc naturel régional des Landes de Gascogne
