= Forest of Customary Rights of La Teste-de-Buch =

French forest

Usagère Forest of La Teste-de-Buch
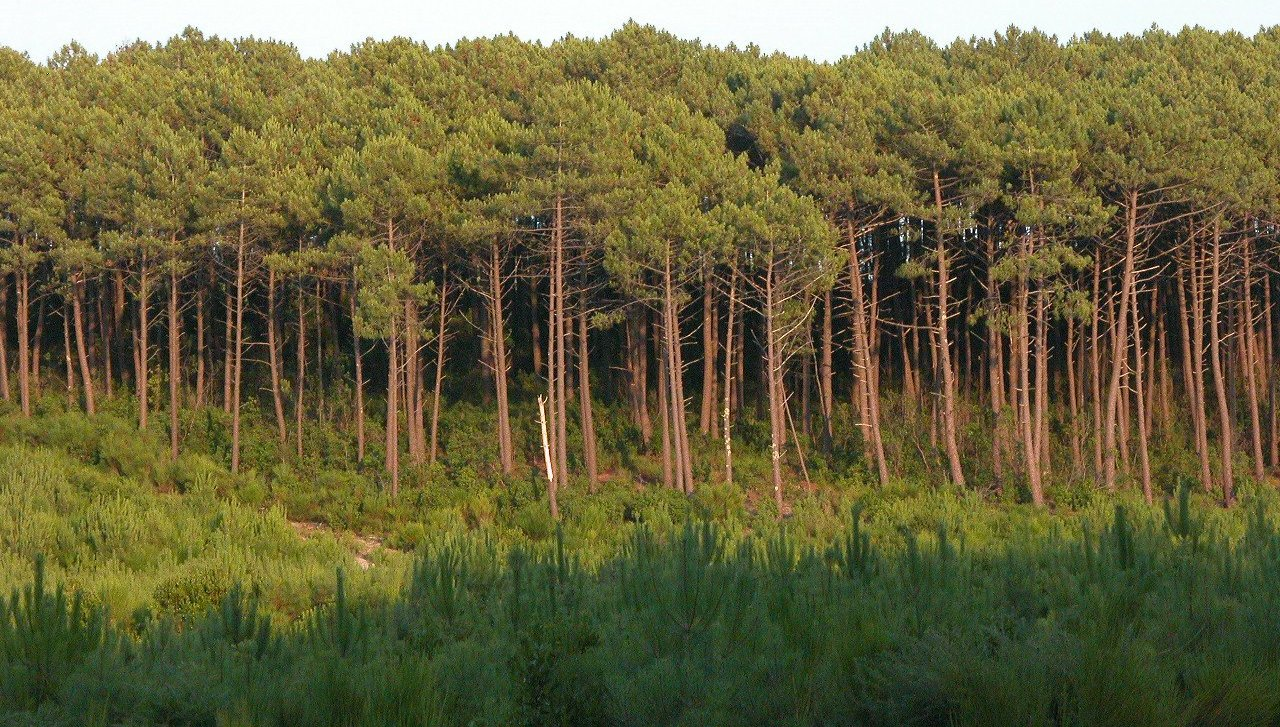

- Location within France

Geography
- Location: Gironde, Nouvelle-Aquitaine, France
- Coordinates: 44°33′57″N 1°10′50″W
- Area: 3,900 ha (9,600 acres)

Administration
- Status: Common land, private

Ecology
- Forest cover: Protected by Natura 2000
- Dominant tree species: Maritime pine, oak

The forest of customary rights of La Teste-de-Buch, also known as the Grande Montagne de La Teste, has covered part of the current territory of the commune of La Teste-de-Buch in Gironde since the beginning of the Christian era. In the 21st century, it remains the last user forest in France: private landowners, known as ayant-pins, hold the exclusive right to exploit pine resin on their plots but are not the owners of the trees; meanwhile, the inhabitants of the former Captal de Buch territory, known as common forests (or usagers in French), are entitled to use the wood for their personal heating and construction needs.

Growing on ancient stabilized dunes, this two thousand year oldpine-oak forest boasts a unique ecological diversity within the Landes de Gascogne. This precious ecosystem results from the unique exploitation methods maintained for centuries due to its specific legal status. Since synthetic chemistry rendered resin tapping obsolete in the 1970s and the demand for construction wood dwindled, interest from both owners and users in their shared heritage has waned. Stakeholders (owners, user defense groups, municipalities, nature conservation associations, hunters, public authorities, etc.) have failed to reach an agreement, leaving the forest neglected and poorly maintained.

In July 2022, a massive wildfire nearly destroyed it entirely.

== Location and geography ==
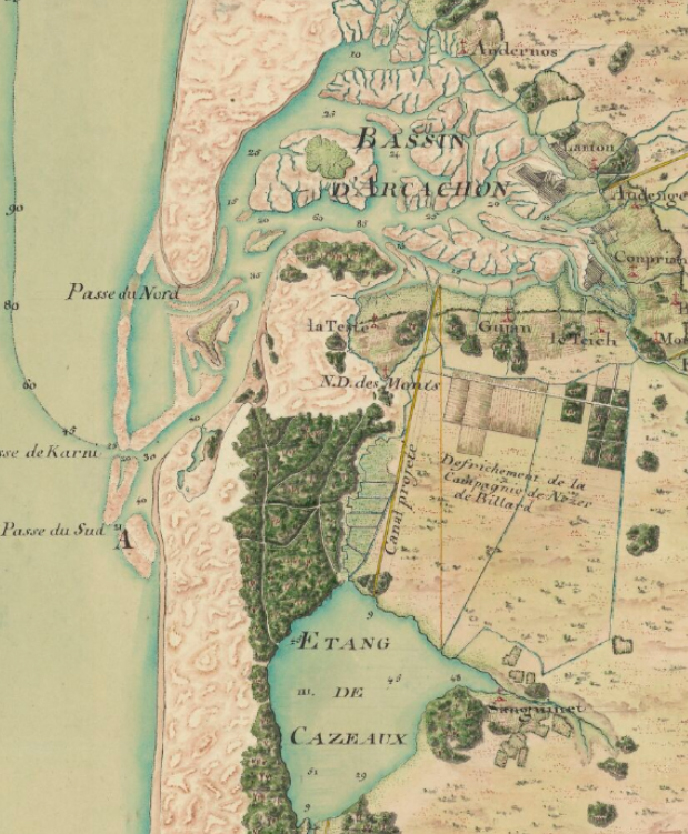
Location of the forest of La-Teste-de-Buch, between the Arcachon basin and the Cazaux lake (Clavaux, 1774).

The Forest of La Teste, documented since Roman times, grows along a coastal strip between the Arcachon Basin to the north and the Cazaux Lake to the south. It covers a series of parabolic dunes that accumulated in the region between 2000 and 500 BCE. These modest but rugged reliefs (seven dunes exceed 50 meters in height, with the highest—Truc de la Truque—peaking at 76 meters) juxtapose hills (trucs) and pseudo-valleys (bats) in a puzzling disarray, earning it the nickname "Grande Montagne."

Throughout the current era, new dune formations—of the barchan type, which formed the Pilat Dune—have isolated the forest from the ocean and progressively eroded its western and northern edges. Due to the encroachment of these modern dunes and urbanization around Arcachon, the Grande Montagne’s area has gradually decreased from around 4,600 hectares at the time of the Revolution to about 3,700 hectares at the start of the 21st century.

The forest is bordered to the southeast by Cazaux Lake, to the north by La Teste-de-Buch and Arcachon, to the northwest by the Pilat Dune, and otherwise by private or state-owned forests. Its position downwind likely contributes to maintaining the Pilat Dune’s height.

Nowadays, the Grande Montagne is crossed by the D218 departmental road, which clips its northwest corner while connecting Arcachon and Biscarosse, and by Route 214, a paved state-owned road cutting east to west through its northern third. This route links the D218 near the Pilat Dune to the D112 departmental road, which serves the Cazaux hamlet from La Teste’s main urban area. In the forest’s southern half, a network of dead-end roads provides access to oil wells established in 1959. Finally, forest paths crisscross the area, less maintained since resin tapping ceased.

== Historical economic aspects ==
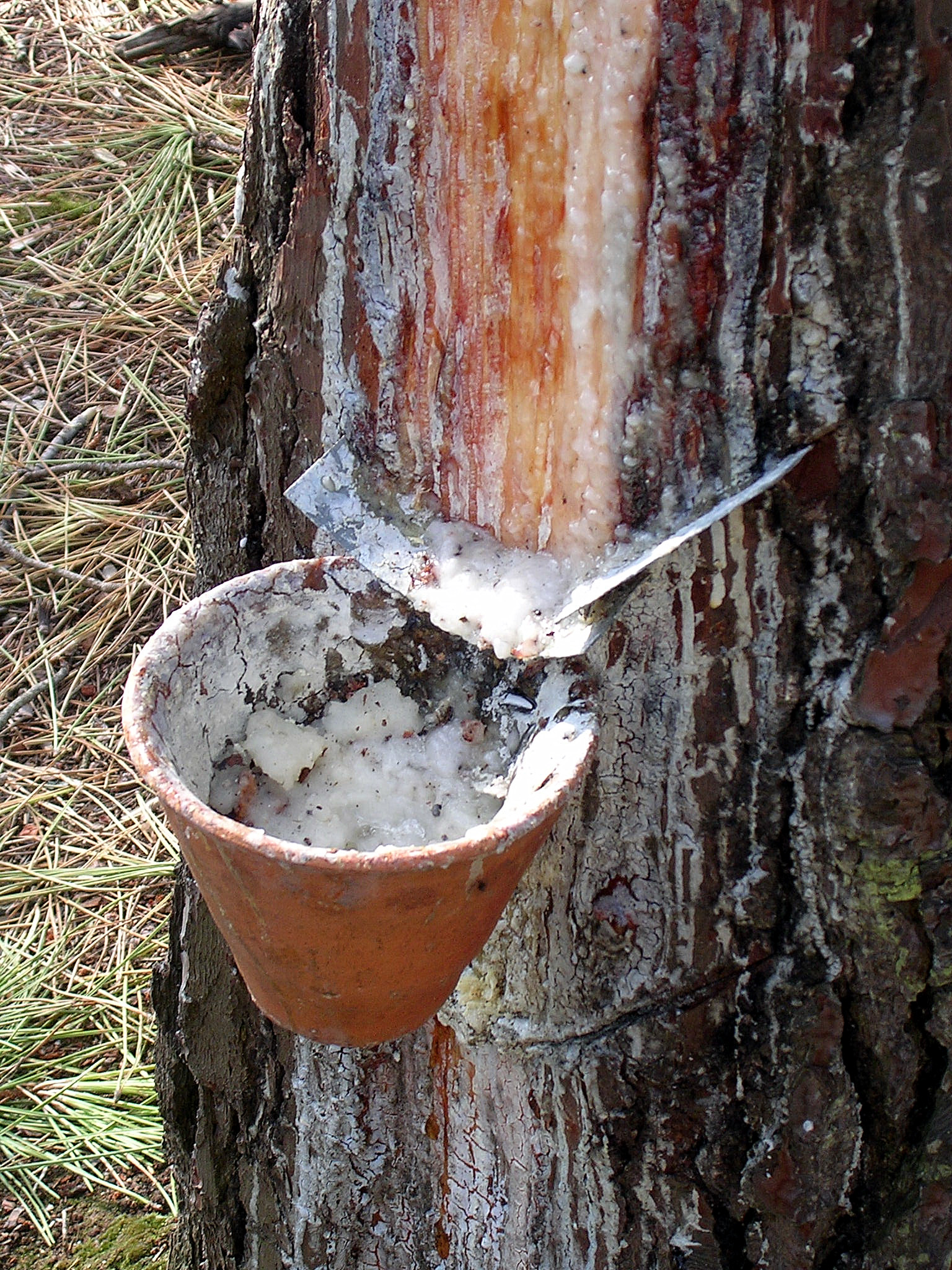
Pine with cones.

The earliest accounts of pine exploitation in the Grande Montagne date back to the 17th century.

The sought-after raw material was the tree’s oleoresin: Throughout the adult life of the pine, it was harvested by gemmage—the practice of making successive incisions in the bark. The exudate, mixed with rainwater and solid impurities and collected in a hole dug at the tree base or in a clay pot, was then called “gemme.” Every two to three weeks from spring to mid-autumn, the resin tapper would refresh the cut and gather the oozing resin. Collected in barrels, the gemme was transported to a distillery where the volatile fraction, turpentine oil, was separated from a solid residue, colophony (also known as arcanson or rousine). Turpentine oil was used to produce solvents, paints, varnishes, polishes, waxes, and medicines, while colophony was used to make paper adhesives, soaps, and printing ink.

Once the tree was dead, the pyrolysis of its trunk and stump produced pine tar (also known as pitch or tar), carbon black, and charcoal. The forest operator constructed on-site kilns (hourns), mounds of stones covered with clay: the wood burned inside releases a viscous liquid collected through an outlet. This liquid was used for caulking boats, waterproofing containers, waxing ropes, and even treating rheumatism and certain skin diseases. These practices persisted until the 1970s, gradually replaced by the rise of industrial synthetic chemistry.

== Usager status ==
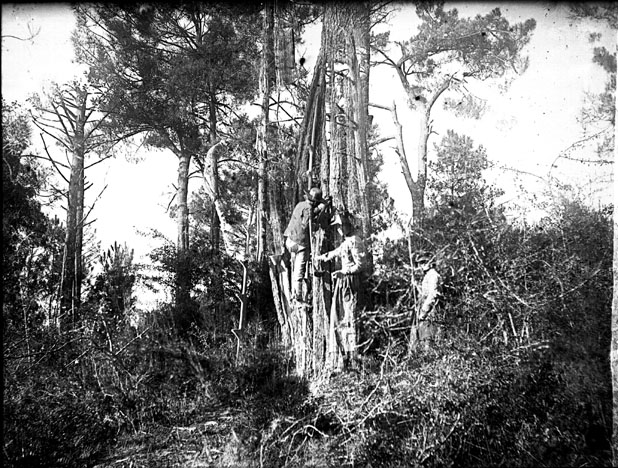
Tapping of a bottle of pine in Arcachon in 1890.

The fundamental principles governing the ownership and use of the Grande Montagne are based on texts, the oldest preserved dating back to 1468, which have been updated several times since then: baillettes (unilateral decisions by the lord) and transactions (formalized agreements between parties):

- The parcels belong to private owners (the Grande Montagne is therefore neither a co-ownership nor part of the public domain).
- These owners are referred to as ayant-pins: they do not own the trees growing on their plots but hold the exclusive rights to commercially exploit their resin.
- Individuals whose primary residence has been located for at least ten years in the communes partially covered by the forest are called usagers. (Note: Therefore, a landowner can be a "having-pins" on their plot and a user of the entire forest.) They may collect dead wood for heating and cut down live pines to build or repair their homes or boats, but are forbidden from commercial use.
- The wood collected by the usagers cannot leave the territory of these municipalities, whether for processing or use.
- Syndics representing ayant-pins and usagers validate logging requests, ensure sustainable harvesting through rotation, and manage the forest "as responsible stewards."

=== History ===
In the Middle Ages, the Grande Montagne belonged to local lords, the Captals of Buch. These lords, from an undetermined time, granted ("leased") various rights to their vassals in exchange for compensation. Each lord who inherited the captalat freely revised these rights and their costs.

The first text (now lost) of which there is a record dates back to the first half of the 15th century: Gaston I de Foix-Grailly granted the inhabitants of the seigneury the paid rights to harvest gemmed resin (gema, galipot) and process it into pitch (rouzina), and the free right to collect firewood (busca) and construction wood (fusta). On October 19, 1468, the baillette of his son Jean de Foix-Grailly-Candale confirmed and reevaluated these rights, which were granted to around forty local families. In 1500, Gaston II de Foix-Grailly-Candale sold, for an annual lump sum, the rights to pasture (herbage) and to gather acorns (glandage) for feeding pigs.

In 1535, the baillette of Gaston III de Foix-Grailly-Candale introduced the appointment of syndics representing the inhabitants, prohibited the sale or transport of wood outside the captalat, and emphasized the importance of managing the forest responsibly.

In 1601, a crisis arose with the new captal, Jean-Louis d’Épernon: a new act was not signed until after three years of "closure" of the forest. It clarified that the ayant-pins acquired ownership of resin extraction concessions, but neither of the land nor the trees. His son Bernard d’Épernon reaffirmed these principles in 1645.

In 1746, François-Alain Amanieu de Ruat signed a transaction granting ayant-pins ownership of the land and limiting the rights of usagers. Following protests from the usagers, a new agreement was made on June 16, 1759: the ayant-pins retained ownership of the land, as well as their cabins and resin, but still not the trees, while the usagers regained their free rights to wood. The captal kept the rights to acorn gathering and grazing, along with the privilege of using wood for his château—despite it being located outside the territory, in Le Teich.

It was under this contractual state that the French Revolution occurred. Some usagers then sought to have the forest, a former seigneurial property, become communal land. However, the arbitral tribunal, convened on 8 Fructidor Year II (August 25, 1794), dismissed their claim, arguing that the forest had not belonged to a noble since 1746. The tribunal confirmed the ownership of the ayant-pins and the servitudes imposed on them in favor of the usagers, which were inseparable from their ownership title. At that time, there were 104 parcels held by 38 families.

In 1917, a new agreement was signed to govern the conditions for exploiting trees killed by natural disasters. This decision followed disputes between ayant-pins and usagers after a hurricane in 1897 and a fire in 1898. The agreement stipulated that the revenue from wood sales would be shared among the owners (50%), the municipalities of La Teste-de-Buch and Gujan (Note: Since 1936, the territory of the commune of Gujan-Mestras also fell under the Captalat de Buch during the Ancien Régime, granting its inhabitants user rights.) (33%), and a syndical fund responsible for managing common affairs between usagers and ayant-pins (17%).

Finally, various revisions were enacted in 1952, 1955, and 1977, the latter limited to a five-year duration.

=== Contemporary conflicts and issues ===
Recurrent conflicts between the involved parties have marked the 20th and 21st centuries, stirring debates in the La Teste municipal council, the columns of the regional press, and the courts of Bordeaux.

The question of whether usagers can cut down oaks for firewood remains controversial. The agreements limit the felling of live oaks to construction work, but oak wood, being a higher-quality fuel than pine, was not favored by owners during the resin-tapping era. Consequently, unauthorized cuts have often occurred.

Another debate centers around if the right of use extends to the inhabitants of Cap Ferret. Until 1976, the end of the Cap Ferret peninsula was part of the commune of La Teste, before a referendum joined it to Lège for practical reasons. As residents of the former captalat territory, the approximately 2,000 year-round residents are entitled to usager rights in the forest. But it was still questioned if this privilege should be limited to those who lived there ten years before the affiliation change. The debate remains unresolved, and in 2008, a resident of Cap Ferret organized a high-profile tree felling and transport by pinasse to Cap Ferret—avoiding the wood leaving the "former boundaries of the captalat."

A similar debate concerns the residents of Arcachon, a city separated from La Teste in 1857 to facilitate urban expansion. At the time, the few inhabitants explicitly renounced their right of use in exchange for full ownership of parcels.

The stakeholders also struggle to agree on how to represent the usagers. According to the transactions, usagers are supposed to organize themselves into a union. However, under state pressure and after several legal proceedings, it was decided in 1976 that the municipal councils of La Teste and Gujan-Mestras would represent the usagers. Nevertheless, a users’ association, the ADDU-FU, tends to fill this role.

The rights of access to the forest massif are also regularly questioned: the transactions prohibit owners from blocking paths or fencing off their plots. However, motor vehicle traffic and the organization of hikes or other events are regulated.

Finally, controversies occasionally arise regarding the possibility of building or improving the structures of the hundred resin workers’ cabins identified in 1901, beyond the renovations conditionally authorized by the land use plan, in a context where land and real estate speculation is a proven temptation.

=== Land ownership in 2016 ===
The 3,895.52 hectares registered in 2016 are divided into 388 parcels, grouped into 161 properties.

Owners	Area (ha)	
Individuals	2,391	61%
Legal entities	343	9%
Mixed individual and legal entity	37	1%
Public institutions (mainly Coastal protection agency)	171	4%
Local authorities (mainly the communes of La Teste and Gujan-Mestras)	237	6%
Undivided Property between Owners	684	18%
Unknown	33	1%
Total	3,896	

The exact owners of approximately 875 hectares cannot be identified due to incomplete titles, undefined properties, or complex co-ownerships. This situation hinders the achievement of a quorum of ayant-pins landowners.

Fifty properties cover more than 25 hectares, together representing 71% of the forest's area; the rest is very fragmented, with some properties being less than one hectare. Owners of at least 51% of the forest reside within the former captalat; owners of at least 82% live in the departments of Gironde or Landes.

=== Attempts at land partitioning ===
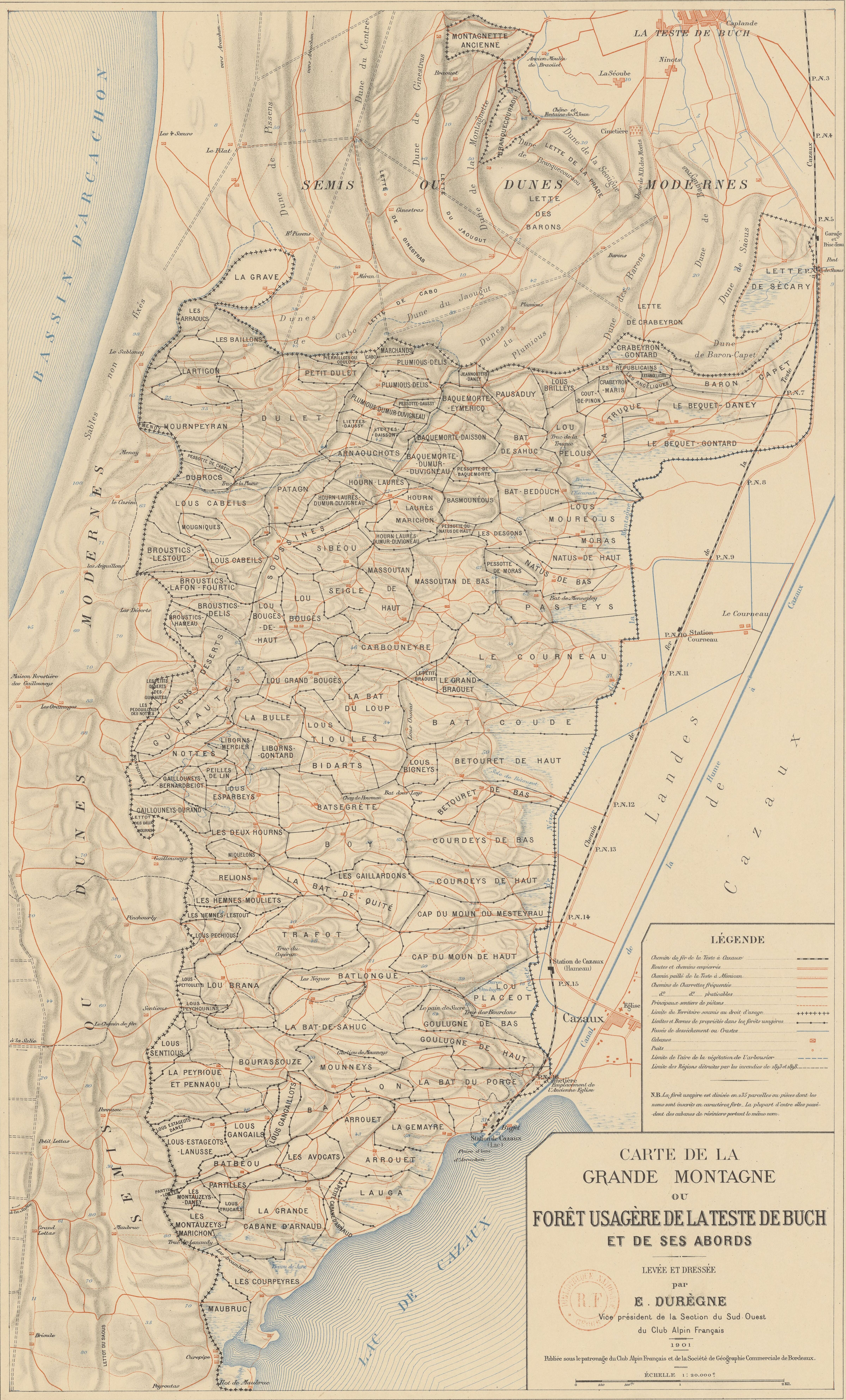
The map drawn up by E. Durègne in 1901 shows the historic plots of the Grande Montagne.

Land partitioning (cantonnement) is the act of granting a community full ownership of a portion of the forest in exchange for the rights it exercised over the entire massif. This type of act, common in France during the Second Empire, ended all other forest user statuses nationwide.

Starting in the 1970s, several voices were raised to end the user status of the Grande Montagne by partitioning it.

On one side, ayant-pins landowners argued that their land holdings no longer provided income since the commercial market for resin-tapping had disappeared. (Note: In 2022, the production cost of one liter of resin was two and a half times higher than the global market price.) Only those living in the former captalat territory had user rights over the wood, and all were subject to the usual responsibilities of landowners (including property tax, obligation for proper forest management and DFCI tax). On the other side, state services were alarmed by the low productivity of the forest and its progressive degradation due to lack of maintenance.

Opposition to this initiative came from environmental protection associations such as SEPANSO, convinced that the massif’s valuable ecosystem was due to its unique status, as well as from user associations and a significant portion of the owners—particularly those living year-round in the affected communes.

In September 1977, partitioning advocates simultaneously filed a lawsuit against the two concerned communes and a proposal for an amicable settlement, offering full ownership of 745 hectares to the municipalities. Thirteen of the plaintiff owners would cede part of their parcels. In March 1981, the Bordeaux Court of Appeal rejected the request. An appeal to the Court of Cassation failed because the request was not supported by all owners - seventy-nine owners had not endorsed the initiative.

Taking advantage of a 1985 amendment to the Forest Code that relaxed the required quorum—an amendment pushed by a Girondin senator specifically to address the case of the Grande Montagne—some owners made a new offer for an amicable cantonnement in 1987, proposing 120 hectares to the communes. However, the initiative failed once again.

In 2010, a ruling by the Bordeaux Court of Appeal ended all attempts at cantonnement, acknowledging the impossibility of identifying all the owners.

== Vegetation before the July 2022 fire ==
The vegetation is typical of the Landes de Gascogne and shaped by the user status of the forest, which was exploited for resin production. Over the centuries, this status has had multiple direct and collateral effects:

- It prevented clear-cutting and line planting, practices used in the rest of the Landes, in favor of selective, tree-by-tree cutting known as "jardinage," which encouraged regeneration and maintained trees of varying ages.
- It preserved mature pine trees as long as they were suitable for resin tapping and promoted their growth over that of pedunculate oaks.
- Under these mature pines, with a density of 120 to 130 per hectare, it maintained a relatively open understory that was accessible.
- It resulted in the formation of fertile humus.
- Until the mid-20th century, it maintained a dense network of footpaths and small trails ("menades") that allowed resin workers to reach each pine.

However, since the end of resin tapping, the incentive to maintain the understory has diminished, and a very dense vegetation has developed.

The Haut-Natus plot in June 2022

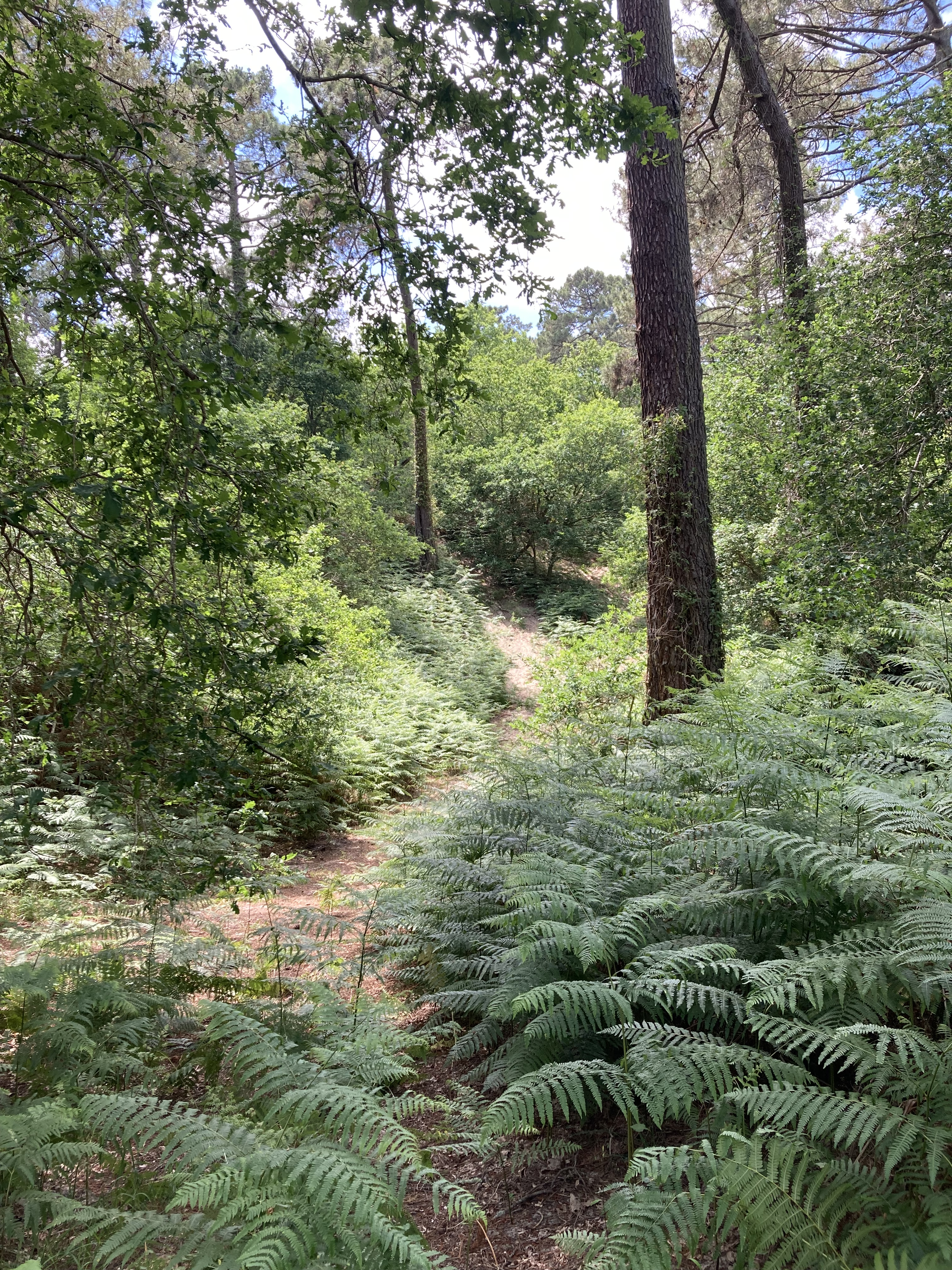

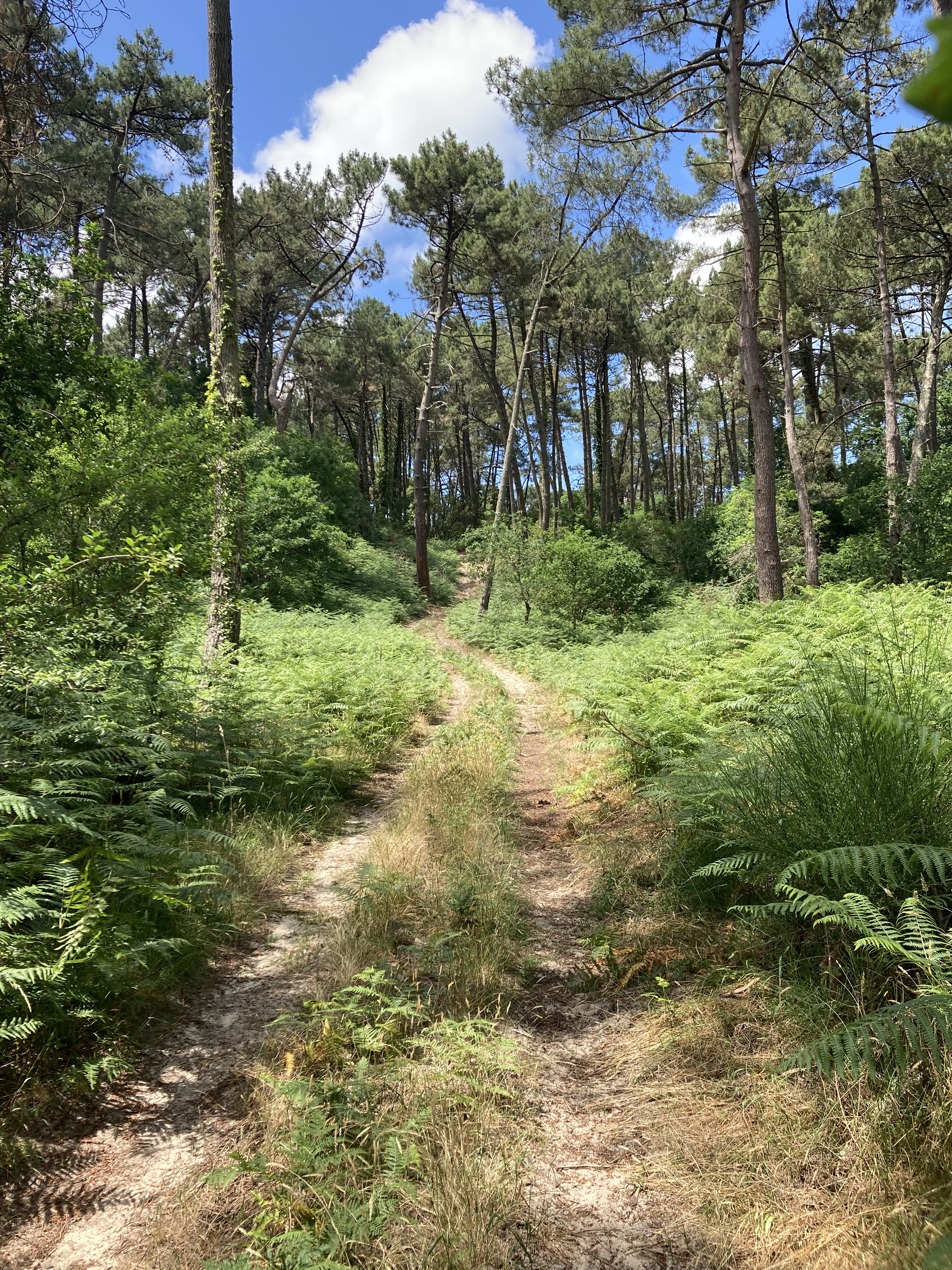

The forest is a natural pine-oak grove (maritime pines and pedunculate oaks) arranged in an irregular high forest. The shrub layer consists of holly, hawthorn, medlar, plum, blackthorn, dog rose, wild pear, rowan, service tree, and viburnum. It harbors bracken fern, honeysuckle, butcher’s broom, rockrose, buckthorn, green heather, bell heather, heather, and gorse. The herbaceous layer is rich in cinquefoil, bentgrass, germander, and madder. The vegetation on the southwest slopes of the old parabolic dunes is more lush and diverse than on the northeast slopes, which are sparsely populated by pedunculate oaks, some holly, and bracken fern.

To the northwest, sheltered from prevailing winds by the Dune of Pyla, strawberry trees and sage-leaved rockrose become more abundant.

On the eastern edge of the forest, particularly near the Étang de Cazaux, there are approximately 290 hectares of wetlands or marshy areas. These zones are predominantly covered with alders, willows, and birches, under which grow buckthorn, swamp sawgrass, purple moor-grass, grasses, bog myrtle, water naval, loosestrife, royal fern, Portuguese heath, and more.

The forest is scattered with clearings around the cabins of former resin workers, which once served as vegetable gardens or grazing areas and are now more or less closed off. At the start of the 21st century, these covered 138 hectares. It is also punctuated by natural gaps caused by the spread of a cryptogamic pine disease due to honey fungus (Armillaria).

=== Protection ===
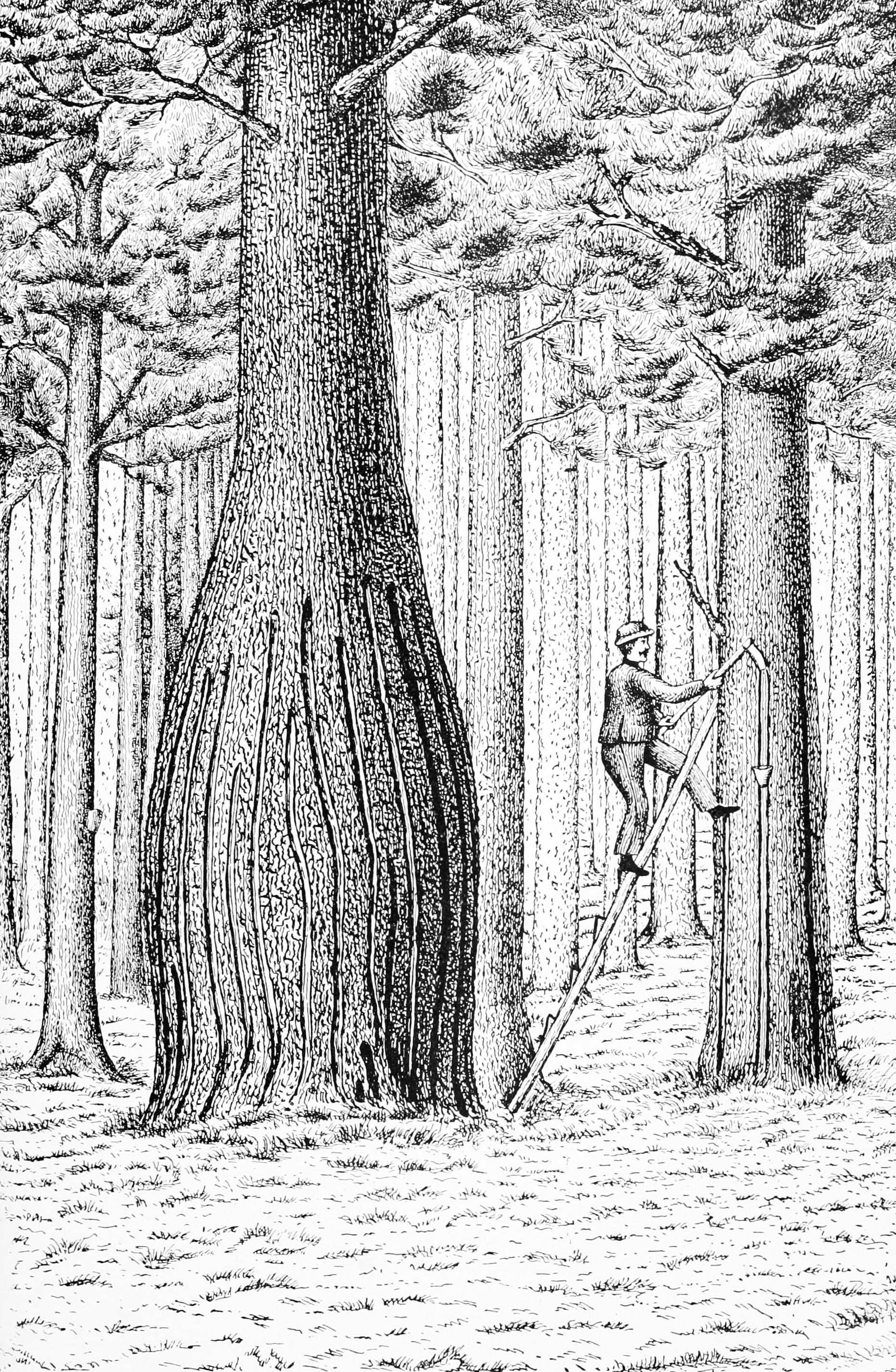
A pine bottle tree, c. 1895.

In 1943, the portion of the forest located west of RD218 (Note: Simultaneously with the classification of the Dune du Pilat: classification of the Hourn Peyran parcel, and registration of the Menoy, Lartigon, Les Arrouacs, and Les Baillons parcels.) was listed in the inventory of sites. The entire Grande Montagne was listed in 1977 and then classified in June 1994.

A proposal to classify it as a protected forest did not succeed, as it was incompatible with the presence of oil wells. Such a classification would have ended the user status by subjecting the management of the massif to the Forest Code. However, it is classified as a special conservation area in the National Natural Heritage Inventory, and as a natural area of ecological, floristic, and faunal interest.

It has benefited from the Natura 2000 label since late 2005.

Two types of maritime pine specimens, altered by human activity, centuries-old, and endangered, are protected by a prefectural decree: "bottle pines," so heavily tapped for resin that healing ridges caused a significant widening of the base of their trunks and the formation of cavities that shelter many bird species, and "boundary pines," tall and smooth because they were never tapped, which landowners allowed to grow at the corners of their parcels to mark property boundaries.

== Toponymy ==
The main dunes, valleys, resin workers' cabins, and even cadastral plots bear Gascon names often dating back to the Middle Ages. Examples include Hourn Laurès ("the laurel oven"), Lartigon (from Gascon artigue 'cleared land'), lous Broustics ("places covered with brush"), Batsegrette ("the secret valley"), or Lauga (from Gascon augar 'marshy terrain').

== Other traces of human activity ==
In 1901, 123 cabins were recorded in the forest, where resin workers lived. These cabins often featured a well, beehives, a kitchen garden, and an orchard. A 2020 survey identified 85 remaining cabins. Some are used as permanent residences (32 in 1976), and a few have their own electricity. The 2022 fire destroyed about fifty of these cabins.

Since 1948, the Natus Necropolis has housed, at the edge of the forest, the remains of more than 950 Senegalese Tirailleurs, eleven Russian soldiers, and two French servicemen who died at the nearby Courneau military camp, established during World War I for the "wintering" of colonial units from sub-Saharan Africa stationed on the front. Many succumbed to pneumonia epidemics during the winter of 1916-1917.

In the southern part of the forest, Esso drilled ninety-three oil wells starting in 1959; forty-seven were still operational in 2021, operated by Vermilion REP. The 30 km² deposit, buried between 2,500 and 3,200 meters deep, is the second-largest oil field in France, with a daily production of 250 cubic meters of crude oil. The opening of eight additional wells received a favorable opinion in 2023 after a public inquiry but faced strong opposition.

== Fires and storms ==
Fire of 2022: affected area as of July 17.

The crowns of the pine trees in the forest used by the community scorched by the fire of 2022, seen from the top of the Dune du Pilat in October 2022.

Historical archives record that a hurricane in 1799 felled more than 40,000 pines, causing a 90% drop in resin production. Two centuries later, the Martin storm’s 166 km/h winds toppled many trees in the southwest of the usager forest.

Parts of the Grande Montagne have fallen prey to multiple fires, notably in 1708 (one death), in 1716 (2,700 hectares in the south), in 1811, in 1822 (140 hectares in the southern third of the forest, of human origin), in 1843, 1863, 1865, in the spring of 1893 (277 hectares in the northwest of the massif, over several months), in 1898 (755 hectares in the southern third of the forest), in July 1912 (300 hectares), in 1929, in September 1943 after a bombing (535 hectares in the southern third of the massif), in July 1952 (190 hectares), and in 1973 (62 hectares). Since then, fires have been limited (500 to 700 pines in total in 1981, 0.8 hectares in 2001 after a rave party, and 2 hectares twice in 2003). The resilience of the usager forest to fires is a subject of debate: some argue that the lack of maintenance of undergrowth and forest paths complicates the work of firefighters; others believe that botanical diversity, the proportion of deciduous trees, and the terrain are capable of slowing the spread of a potential blaze.

From July 12 to 23, 2022, a fire devastated the massif. It broke out around 3:00 p.m. on July 12, when a utility vehicle suffered a severe electrical problem on Route Fueled by the heatwave, the fire rapidly moved southward until July 17, when a shift in the winds drove it back north. In total, 7,000 hectares of forest—usager, state-owned, or prand te—were affected, and 20,000 people were evacuated before firefighters managed to contain the flames.

After the fire of July 2022

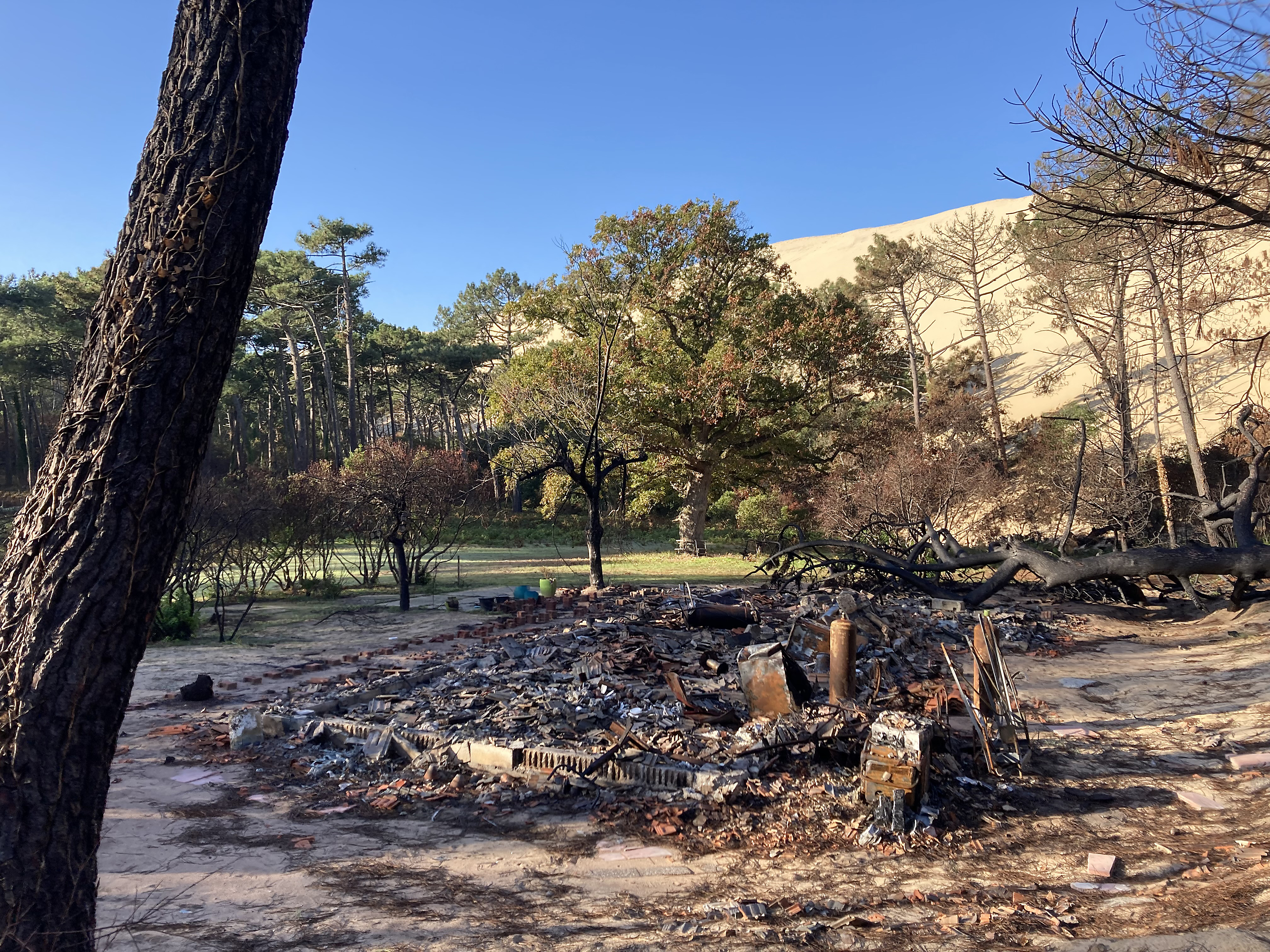
The Lartigon hut, at the foot of the large dune, destroyed.

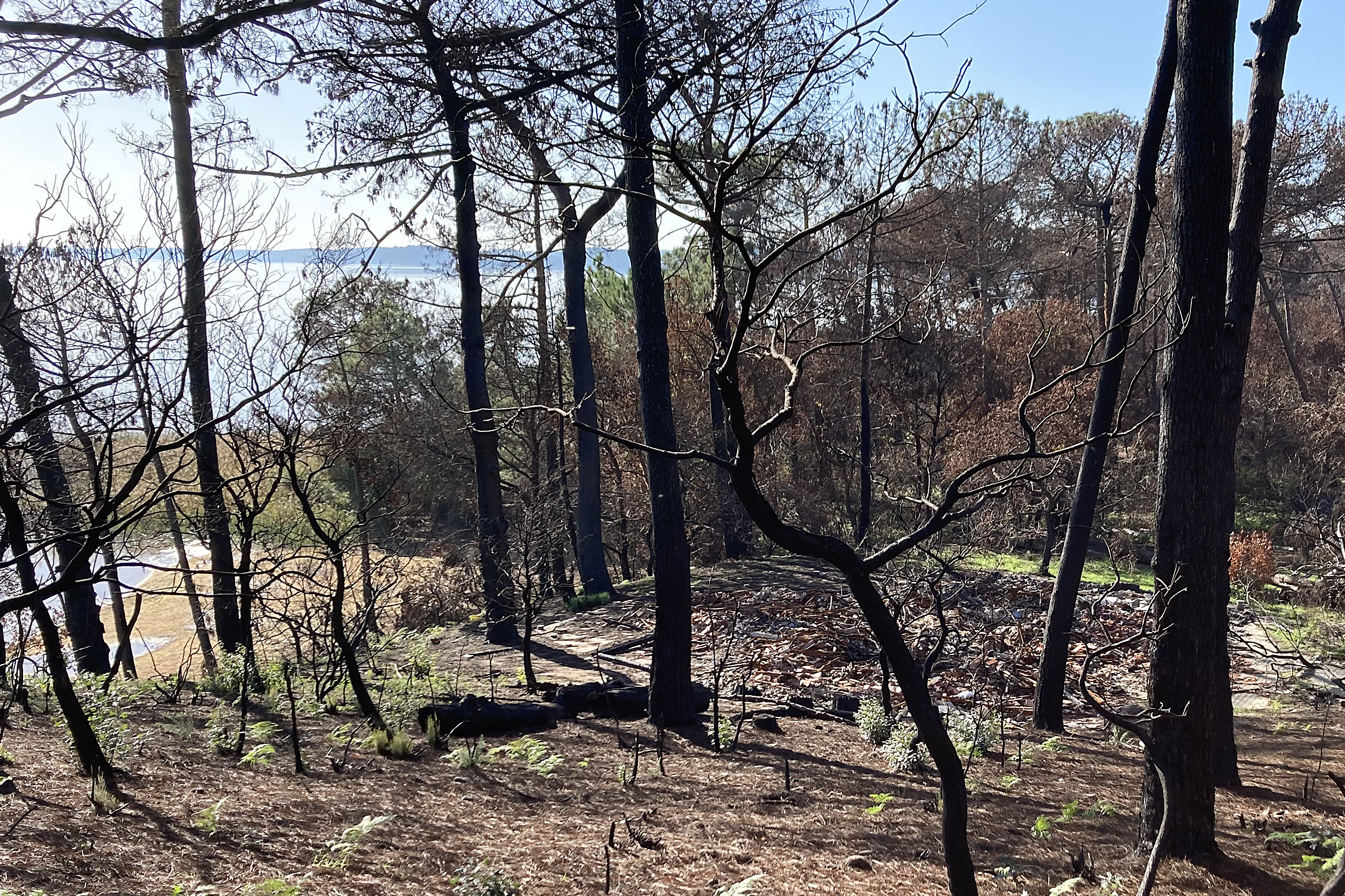
Rubble from the Lauga huts, on the shores of Lake Cazaux.

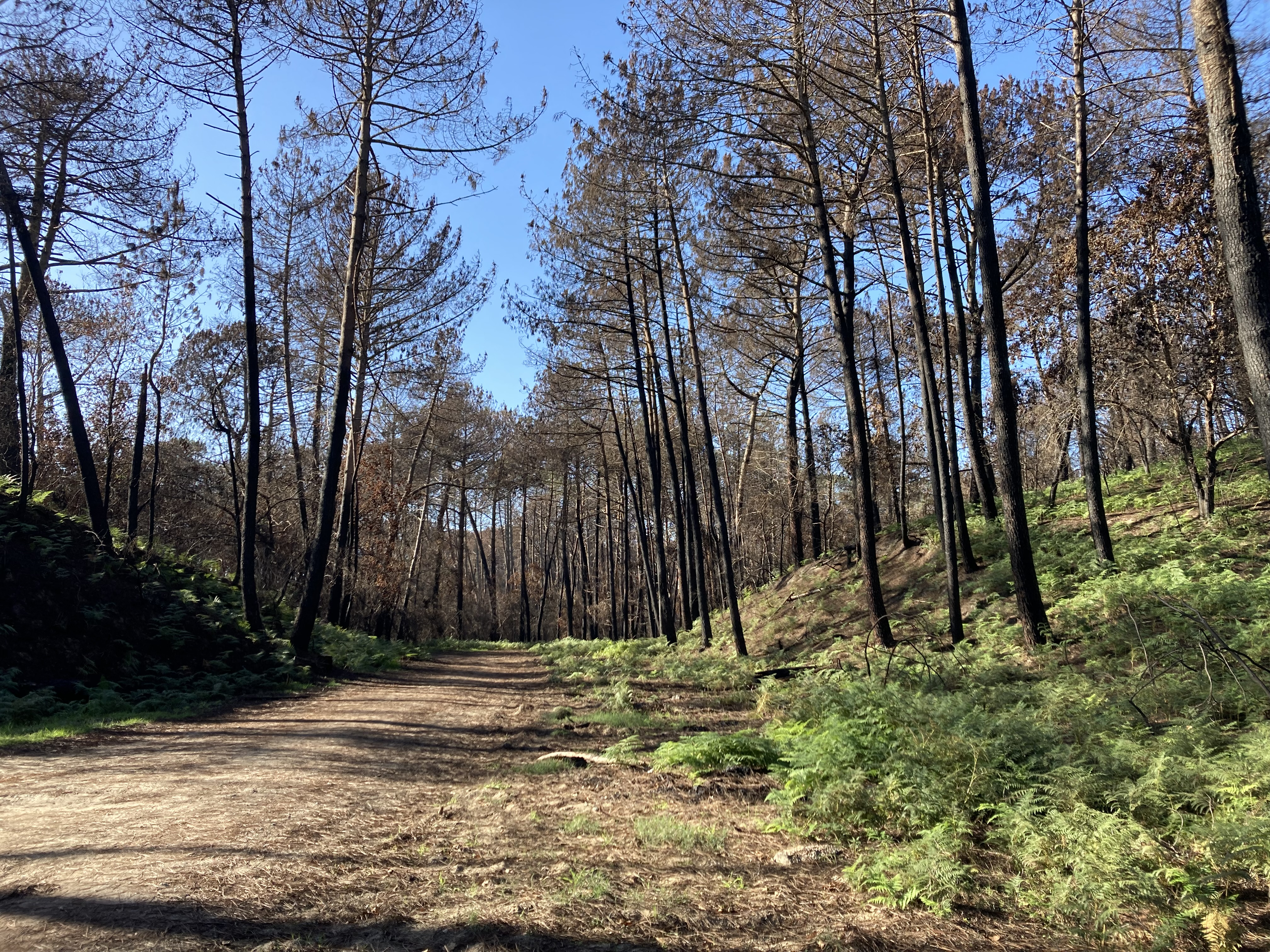
The forest.

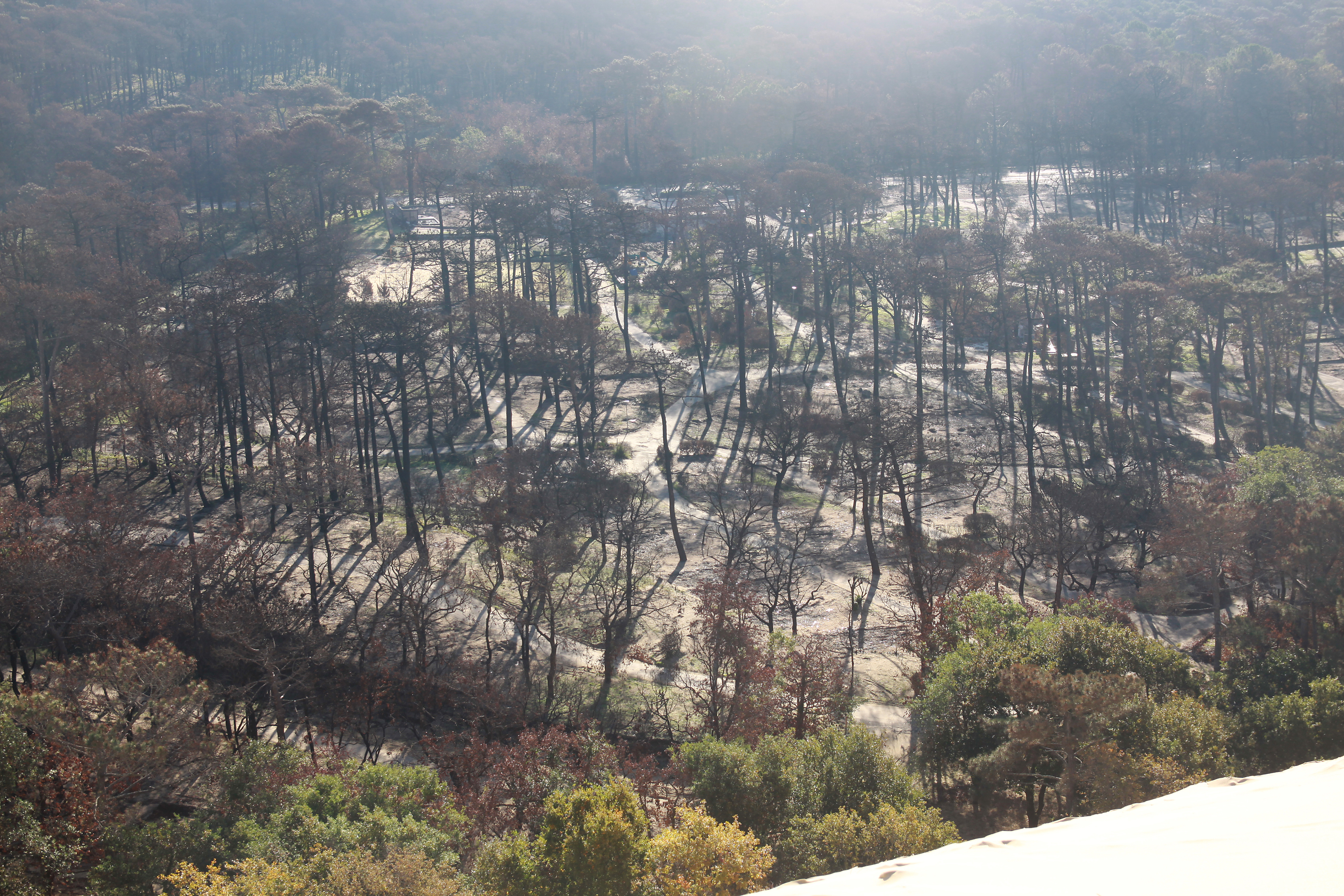
Remains of the campsites at the foot of the dune.

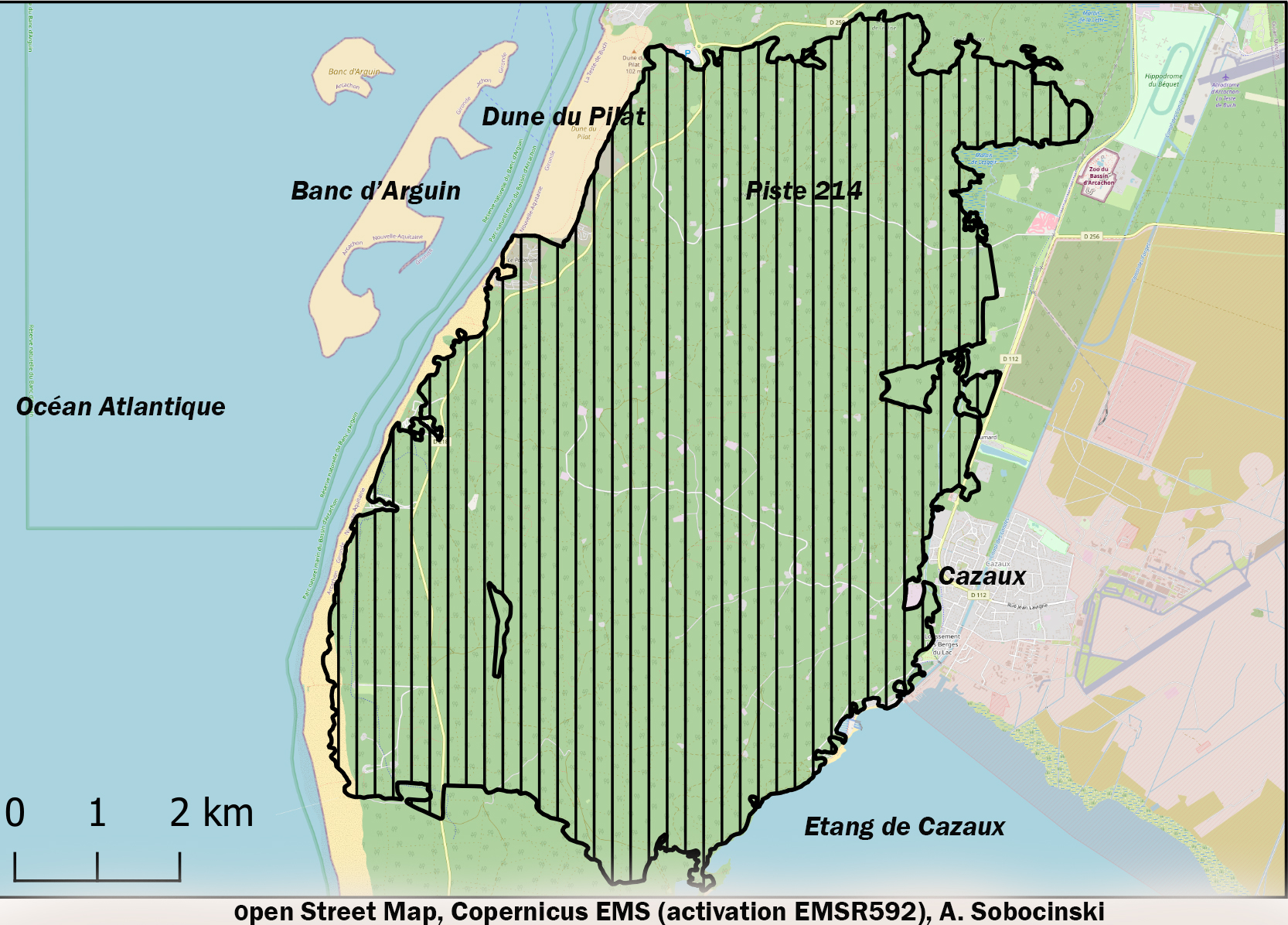
Final assessment of the affected areas.

== Restoration ==
Aerial mapping conducted in December 2022 identified the majority of areas where photosynthesis is still active at the tops of conifers and those where the trees are dead. Although it will take several decades to restore a mature forest, nature has gradually reclaimed its territory in the months following the disaster, with the regrowth of ferns, understory plants, and the germination of young pines.

However, the immediate priority was to remove the dead pines: INRAE fears the proliferation of the stenographer beetle, a half-centimeter-long insect that primarily targets damaged conifers. The challenge is to protect the spared trees and, above all, the adjacent forests. Delayed by disagreements among stakeholders, unfavorable weather, and an unprofitable timber market, logging did not begin until January 2023. By the end of October, half of the deadwood had been removed, and numerous piles of infested trunks remained stored on-site; the felling operations (Note: These operations claimed the life of a lumberjack in January 2024.) were completed in June 2024, with 570,000 tons of wood evacuated and 10% of the trees left standing. The sale of the felled pines generated 9 million euros.

During these operations, and for safety reasons, a municipal decree—contested by the association of forest users —prohibited public access to the forest. Access was fully restored on July 1, 2024.

Several options are being considered for the forest’s reforestation. In September 2022, scientists, particularly from INRAE, launched a petition calling for the cessation of the systematic felling of the remaining trees and the reforestation of the massif through natural regeneration to preserve its uniqueness and diversity. This option is also favored by the association of forest users. A collection of approximately one million seeds from the primary forest is expected to facilitate this restoration.

Another point of debate is whether to allow owners of burned-down cabins to rebuild them. The state has opposed this, a stance contested by the ayant-pins and the mayor of La Teste.

== Bibliography ==
- Mormone, Jean-Michel; Boyer, Patrick; Caule, Jean-Pierre (2008). 1914 – 1918, Le Bassin d'Arcachon [1914–1918, The Arcachon Basin] (in French). La Teste de Buch: Société historique et archéologique d'Arcachon et du Pays de Buch. ISBN 978-2-9529434-1-3.
- Aufan, Robert (2021). La Forêt usagère de La Teste-de-Buch, des origines à nos jours [The La Teste-de-Buch Public Forest, from its origins to the present day] (in French). Asnières-sur-Seine/14-Condé-en-Normandie: Les Établissements. ISBN 9782491505042.
- Cinotti, Bruno; Lavarde, Françoise (2022). La forêt usagère de la Teste de Buch - Un fragile équilibre entre propriété et usage : Rapport du CGAAER n° 21092 et CGEDD n° 014045-01 [The Teste de Buch state forest - A fragile balance between ownership and use: CGAAER report no. 21092 and CGEDD no. 014045-01] (in French).
