= Gujan-Mestras =

- Commune
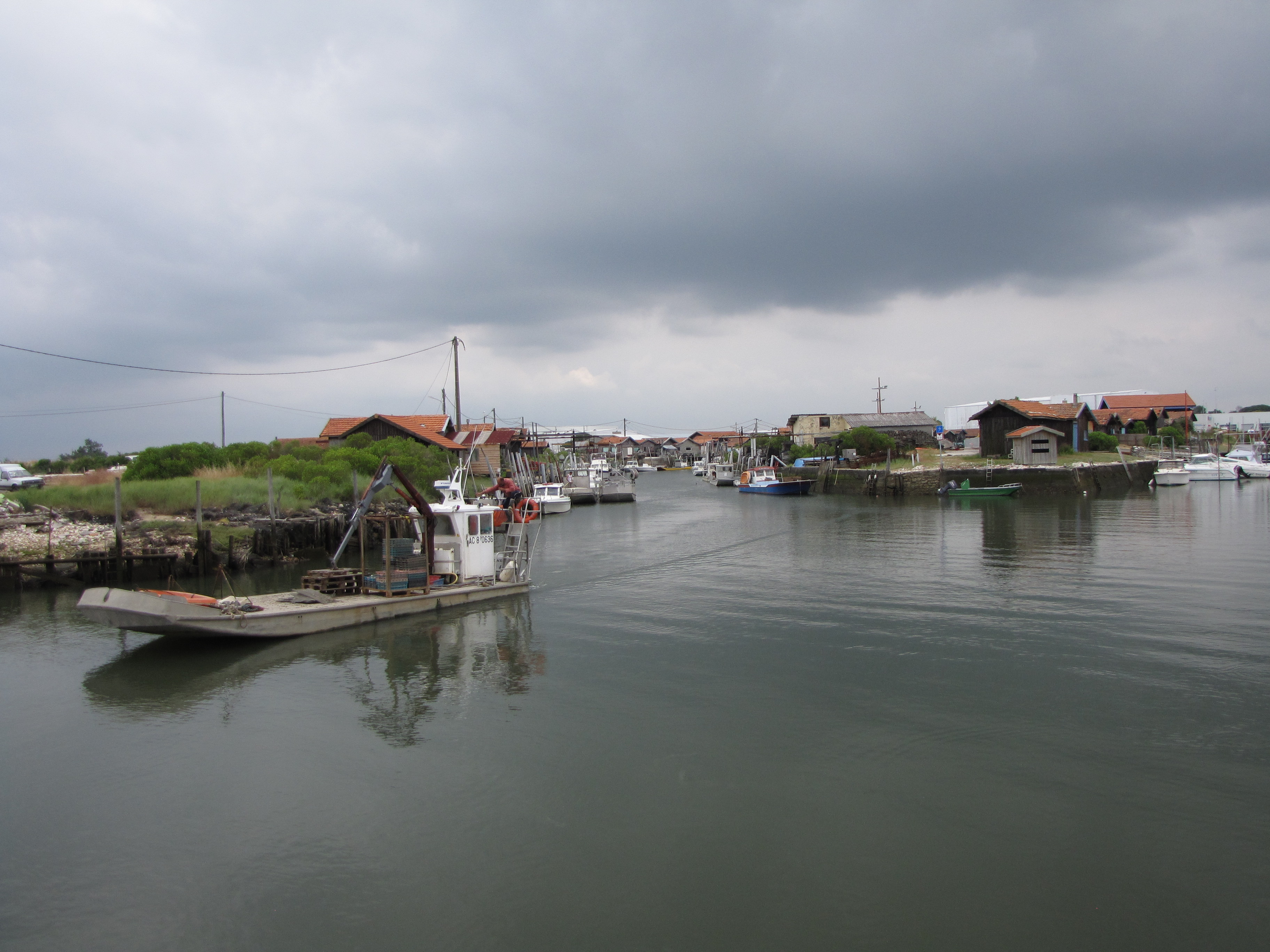
- Oyster port

- Flag Coat of arms
- Location of Gujan-Mestras
- Location within France Location within Nouvelle-Aquitaine
- Coordinates: 44°38′11″N 1°04′00″W
- Country: France
- Region: Nouvelle-Aquitaine
- Department: Gironde
- Arrondissement: Arcachon
- Canton: Gujan-Mestras
- Intercommunality: CA Bassin d'Arcachon Sud

Government
  - Mayor (2026–32): Xavier Paris
- Area^{1}: 53.99 km^{2} (20.85 sq mi)
- Elevation: 4 m (13 ft)
- Highest elevation: 28 m (92 ft)
- Lowest elevation: 0 m (0 ft)
- Population (2023): 22,153
  - Density: 410.3/km^{2} (1,063/sq mi)
- Time zone: UTC+01:00 (CET)
  - Summer (DST): UTC+02:00 (CEST)
- INSEE/Postal code: 33199 /33470
- ^{1} French Land Register data, which excludes lakes, ponds, glaciers > 1 km^{2} (0.386 sq mi or 247 acres) and river estuaries.

Gujan-Mestras (French pronunciation: [ɡyʒɑ̃ mɛstʁas]; Occitan: Gujan e Mestràs) is a commune in the Gironde department in southwestern France. It is twinned with Santa María de Cayón, Spain.

== History ==
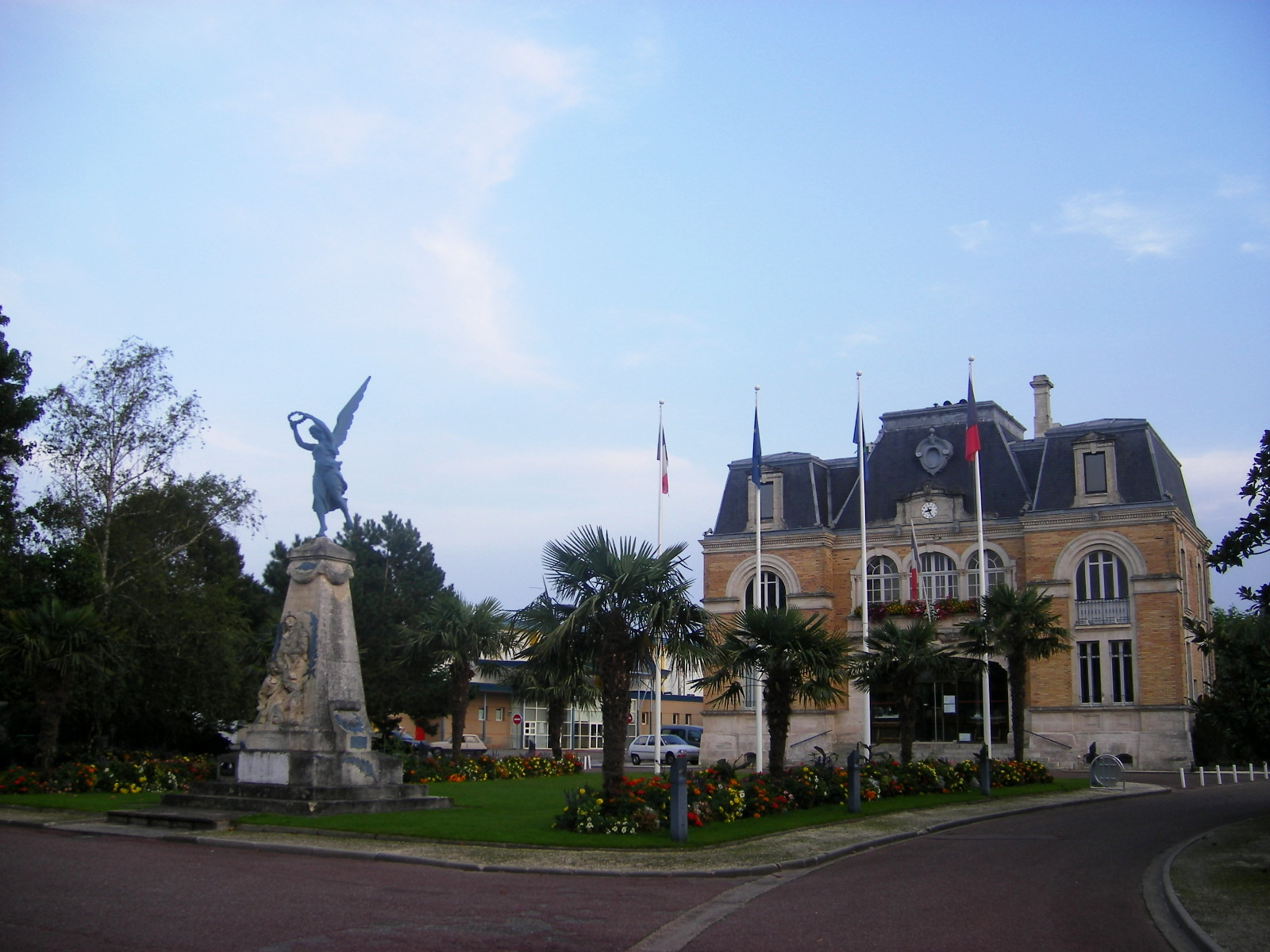
The Hôtel de Ville

The Hôtel de Ville was completed in 1931.

== Population ==
Historical population

Year	Pop.	±% p.a.
1793	1,639	—
1800	1,797	+1.32%
1806	1,785	−0.11%
1821	1,809	+0.09%
1831	1,929	+0.64%
1836	2,183	+2.50%
1841	2,440	+2.25%
1846	2,574	+1.07%
1851	2,685	+0.85%
1856	2,579	−0.80%
1861	2,686	+0.82%
1866	2,833	+1.07%
1872	3,029	+1.12%
1876	3,433	+3.18%
1881	3,906	+2.62%
1886	4,056	+0.76%
1891	3,916	−0.70%
1896	4,019	+0.52%
1901	4,136	+0.58%

Year	Pop.	±% p.a.
1906	4,264	+0.61%
1911	4,659	+1.79%
1921	4,014	−1.48%
1926	4,038	+0.12%
1931	4,065	+0.13%
1936	4,394	+1.57%
1946	4,317	−0.18%
1954	5,033	+1.94%
1962	5,694	+1.55%
1968	6,687	+2.72%
1975	7,613	+1.87%
1982	8,600	+1.76%
1990	11,433	+3.62%
1999	14,958	+3.03%
2007	17,195	+1.76%
2012	20,136	+3.21%
2017	21,152	+0.99%
2023	22,153	+0.77%

Source: EHESS and INSEE (1968-2023)

== Geography ==
Gujan-Mestras is located in the southern part of the Arcachon bay. It is considered a major regional center for oyster farming, and is home to seven ports, which are from west to east:

- The Port of La Hume which focuses both on oyster farming and yachting,
- The Port of Meyran,
- The Port of Gujan,
- The Port of Larros which offers a promenade pier and is an active center for shipbuilding,
- The Port of the Canal,
- The Port of La Barbotière, a major oyster farming center close to the Technical High School for Maritime Science and Technologies
- The Port of La Mole which has neither been dredged nor used due to its difficult topography. From the former windmill bordering the port, only a millstone has withstood time. It gave its name to the Port of La Mole, “mole” meaning millstone in Gascon.

=== Neighbouring communes ===
Gujan-Mestras is surrounded by three communes. It is west of Le Teich, east of La Teste-de-Buch and north of Sanguinet.

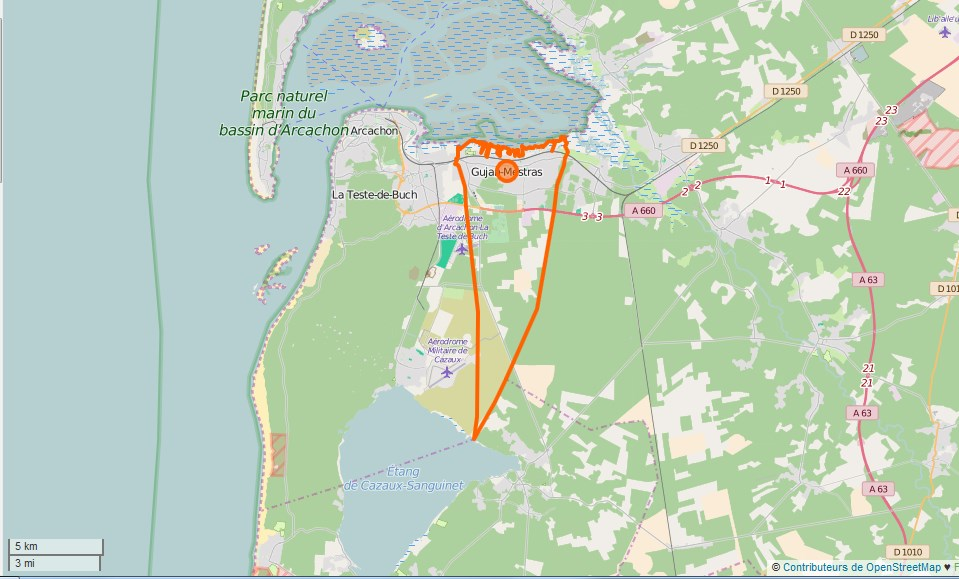
Neighbourging communes of Gujan-Mestras

=== Transports ===
The TER Nouvelle-Aquitaine from Arcachon to Bordeaux has two stops in Gujan-Mestras (respectively named La Hume and Gujan-Mestras). The city is otherwise served by lines 4 to 7 of the Baïa bus network, the local public transport system of the Arcachon Bay which links the Dune of Pilat to Facture-Biganos. Nearest airport is Bordeaux–Mérignac Airport, around 50 km away.

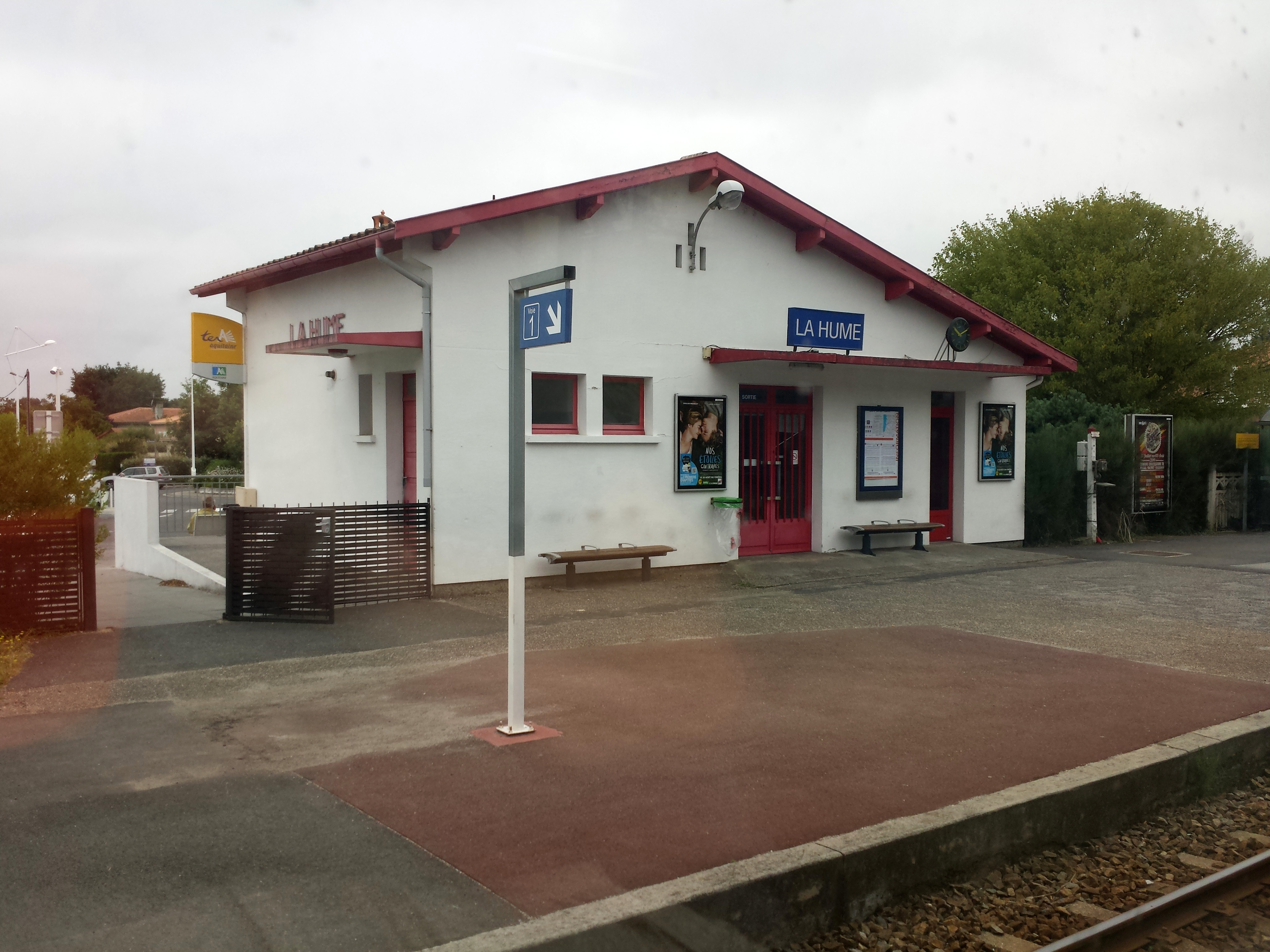
La Hume train station.

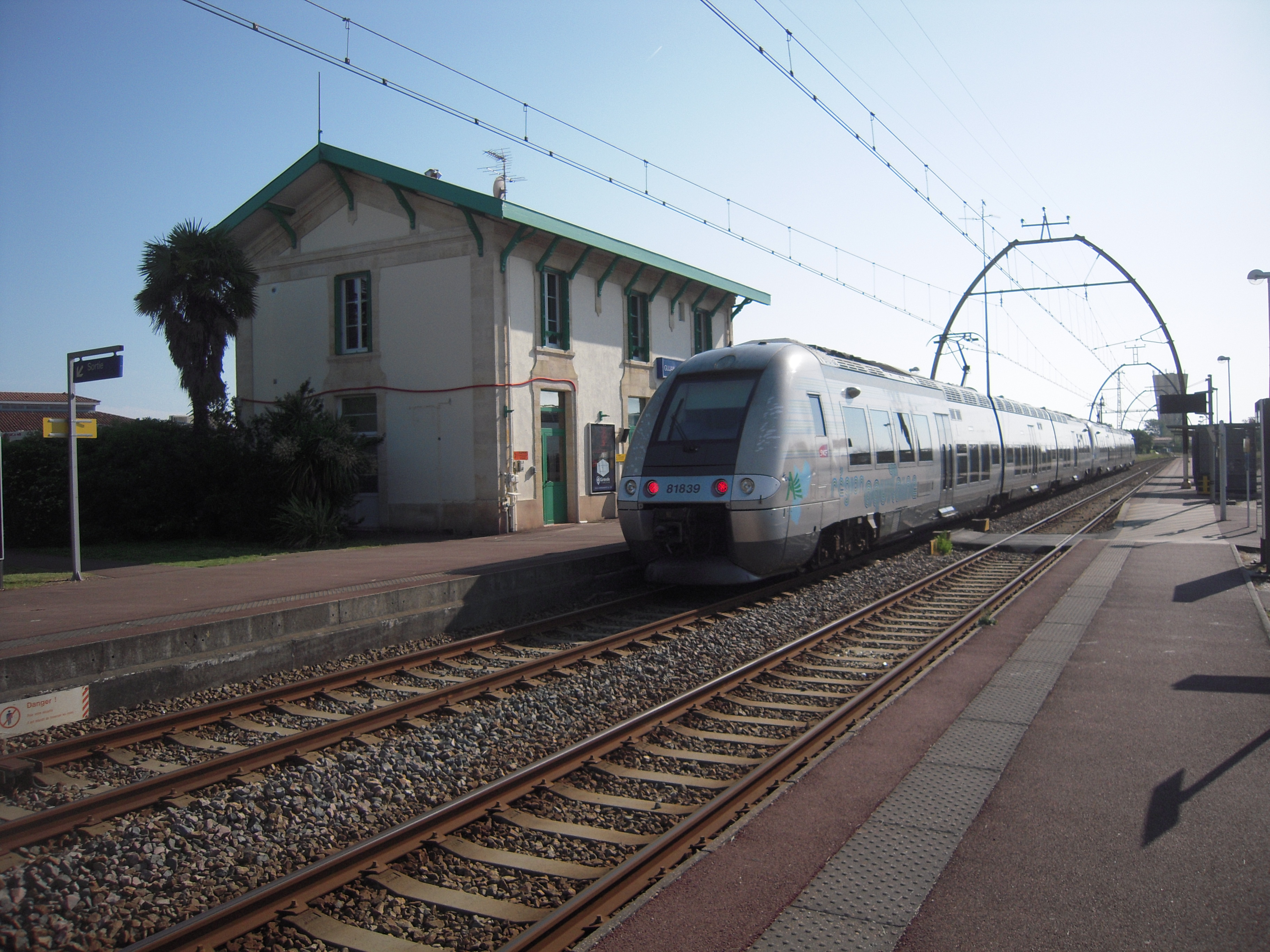
Gujan-Mestras main train station.

== Twin towns – sister cities ==
- Santa María de Cayón, Spain, autonomous community of Cantabria

== See also ==
- Communes of the Gironde department
