= History of women's rugby union matches between France and the Netherlands =

France and the Netherlands played the first women's rugby union test match on 13 June 1982 at the Utrecht Sportpark Strijland, in Utrecht, Netherlands; France won the match 4–0. They played each other annually after that, before meeting in their first multi-national women's rugby competition in 1988 for the Women's Rugby European Cup.

They have met twelve times with France winning eleven of those matches. They last played each other on 17 May 2008.

== Summary ==
=== Overall ===
Details	Played	Won by France	Won by Netherlands	Drawn	France points	Netherlands points
In France	5	5	0	0	89	6
In Netherlands	4	3	1	0	31	13
Neutral venue	3	3	0	0	54	8
Overall	12	11	1	0	174	27

=== Records ===
Note: Date shown in brackets indicates when the record was last set.

Record	France	Netherlands
Longest winning streak	7 (31 May 1987–17 May 2008)	1 (1 May 1986)
Largest points for
Home	24 (15 November 1992)	10 (1 May 1986)
Away	27 (30 April 2007)	—
Largest winning margin
Home	24 (15 November 1992)	10 (1 May 1986)
Away	21 (17 May 2008)	—

== Results ==
No.	Date	Venue	Score	Winner	Tournament	Ref
1	13 June 1982	Utrecht, Netherlands	0–4	France		
2	5 June 1983	La Teste-de-Buch, France	10–0	France		
3	27 May 1984	Hilversum, Netherlands	0–3	France		
4	2 June 1985	Bourg-en-Bresse, France	20–0	France		
5	1 May 1986	Enschede, Netherlands	10–0	Netherlands		
6	31 May 1987	Chalon-sur-Saône, France	22–3	France		
7	21 May 1988	Bourg-en-Bresse, France	13–3	France	1988 European Cup	
8	14 April 1990	Unknown	0–10	France		
9	15 November 1992	Fécamp, France	24–0	France		
10	12 April 1995	Treviso, Italy	17–0	France	1995 FIRA	
11	30 April 2007	Barcelona, Spain	27–8	France	2007 FIRA	
12	17 May 2008	Amsterdam, Netherlands	3–24	France	2008 FIRA	
