= Arcachon – La Teste-de-Buch Airport =

La Teste-de-Buch Airport Aéroport d'Arcachon - La Teste-de-Buch
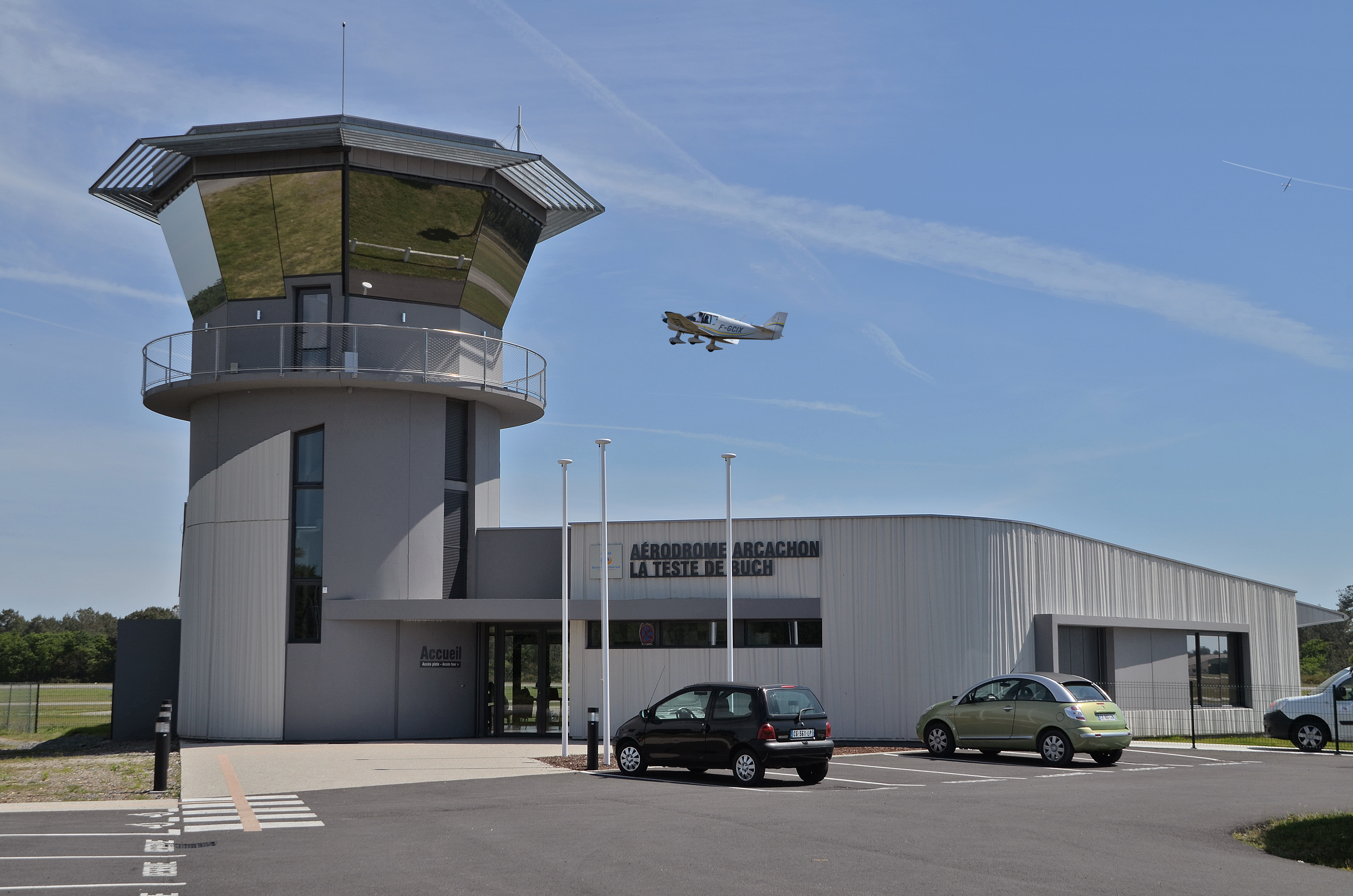
- IATA: none; ICAO: LFCH

Summary
- Airport type: Public
- Serves: Arcachon, France
- Location: La Teste-de-Buch, France
- Elevation AMSL: 49 ft / 15 m
- Coordinates: 44°35′47″N 001°06′39″W
- Interactive map of La Teste-de-Buch Airport

Runways
Direction	Length		Surface
Direction	m	ft	Surface
07L/25R	1,400	4,593	Asphalt
07R/25L	1,180	3,871	Grass
- Source: French AIP

Arcachon – La Teste-de-Buch Airport (French: Aéroport d'Arcachon - La Teste-de-Buch) (ICAO: LFCH) is an airport located 4.5 km southeast of Arcachon and near La Teste-de-Buch, both communes of the Gironde département in France.
