= Hôtel de Ville, La Teste-de-Buch =

Town hall in La Teste-de-Buch, France

Hôtel de Ville
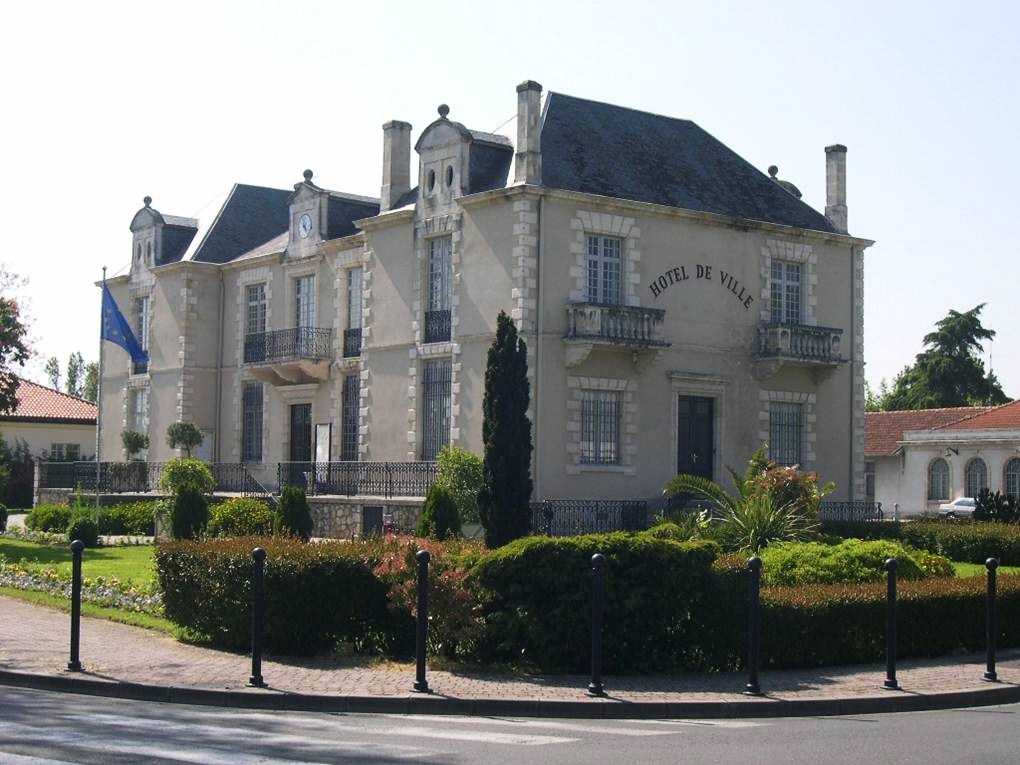
- The main frontage of the Hôtel de Ville in July 2008
- Interactive map of the Hôtel de Ville area

General information
- Type: City hall
- Architectural style: Neoclassical style
- Location: La Teste-de-Buch, France
- Coordinates: 44.6310°N 1.1482°W
- Completed: 1680

The Hôtel de Ville (French pronunciation: [otɛl də vil], City Hall) is a municipal building in La Teste-de-Buch, Gironde, in southwestern France, standing on Allée Georges Clemenceau.

== History ==
The building was originally commissioned as a private residence. It was designed in the neoclassical style, built in brick with a cement render finish and was completed in 1680. The design involved a symmetrical main frontage of five bays facing onto what is now Allée Georges Clemenceau with the end bays projected forward as pavilions. The central bay featured a short flight of steps leading up to a square-headed doorway. There was a French door with a balustraded balcony on the first floor and a clock above. Behind the clock, there was an octagonal belfry. The other bays were fenestrated by casement windows and the end bays were surmounted by panels punctuated by pairs of oculi and topped by segmental pediments and finials.

In the second half of the 18th century, the house belonged to Marie-Thérèse de Caupos, whose family had accumulated their wealth through trading in resinous materials. Her father, Jean-Baptiste de Caupos, had been a member of the Parliament of Bordeaux, vicomte de Castillon and an officer in the French Army. Her husband, François Martial de Verthamon d'Ambloy, became president of the Parliament of Bordeaux.

After Marie-Thérèse de Caupos died, the house remained in the De Caupos family and was later inherited by a priest, Jérôme de Chassaing. Following the French Revolution, the house was seized by the state as biens nationaux. The new town council rented rooms in the house in the late 18th century until it was acquired by a local merchant, Pierre Taffard. The house was later acquired by a local councillor, Jean Fleury, who became mayor in 1830 and then by a local doctor, Jean Hameau, who later also became mayor. Hameau undertook research into viruses and developed original treatments for infectious diseases. He agreed to sell the house to the council in 1843.

The house served as the town hall of the commune for the next one and a half centuries but in the early 21st century, after significant population growth, the council decided to commission a new administrative centre. The site they selected was on the opposite side of the street, facing the town hall. The administrative centre was procured under a public–private partnership in 2011.

The new building was designed in the modern style, built by Group Duval in concrete and glass and was completed in 2013. The design involved a four-storey central section and a pair of three-storey outer sections. The left-hand section incorporated a former school which was refurbished. The upper floors of all three sections featured metal frames supporting a series of horizontal slats to protect the occupants from excessive sunlight. Meanwhile, the original building continued to accommodate the Salle des Mariages (wedding room) and exhibition space. The original building was also modified, to a design by architect Bernard Pison, to accommodate a public library.

In March 2015, the legality of the public–private partnership was challenged by one of the councillors but, in July 2017, the Conseil d'État (council of state) determined that the transaction had been lawful.
