= Communauté d'agglomération Bassin d'Arcachon Sud =

Bassin d'Arcachon Sud
- Communauté d'agglomération
- Interactive map of Bassin d'Arcachon Sud
- Coordinates: 44°35′N 01°07′W
- Country: France
- Region: Nouvelle-Aquitaine
- Department: Gironde
- No. of communes: {{{nbcomm}}}
- Established: 2001

Government
  - President: Marie-Hélène des Esgaulx (LR)
- Area: 328.8 km^{2} (127.0 sq mi)
- Population (2019): 68,185
  - Density: 207.4/km^{2} (537.1/sq mi)
- Website: www.agglo-cobas.fr

Communauté d'agglomération Bassin d'Arcachon Sud is the communauté d'agglomération, an intercommunal structure, covering the area south of the Arcachon Bay. It is located in the Gironde department, in the Nouvelle-Aquitaine region, southwestern France. Created in 2001, its seat is in Arcachon. Its area is 328.8 km^{2}. Its population was 68,185 in 2019.

== Composition ==
The communauté d'agglomération consists of the following 4 communes:

List of communes of the CA Bassin d'Arcachon Sud
Name	INSEE code	Demonym	Area (km^{2})	Population (2019)	Density (per km^{2})
Arcachon (seat)	33009	Arcachonnais	7.56	11,630	1,538
Gujan-Mestras	33199	Gujanais	53.99	21,887	405
Le Teich	33527	Teichois	87.08	8,500	98
La Teste-de-Buch	33529	Testerins	180.2	26,168	145
