= Canton of La Teste-de-Buch =

Administrative division of Gironde, France

Coordinates: 44.63°N 1.15°W

A map of the canton of La Teste-de-Buch in the Gironde department since 2015

The canton of La Teste-de-Buch (French: Canton de la Teste-de-Buch) is a canton (an administrative division) of the Gironde department, Southwestern France. Its borders were modified at the canton reorganisation that came into effect in March 2015. Its seat is La Teste-de-Buch, south of Arcachon Bay on the Atlantic coast. It elects two members of the Departmental Council of Gironde.

It consists of the following two communes:

1. Arcachon
2. La Teste-de-Buch
