= Hôtel de Ville, Gujan-Mestras =

Town hall in Gujan-Mestras, France

Hôtel de Ville
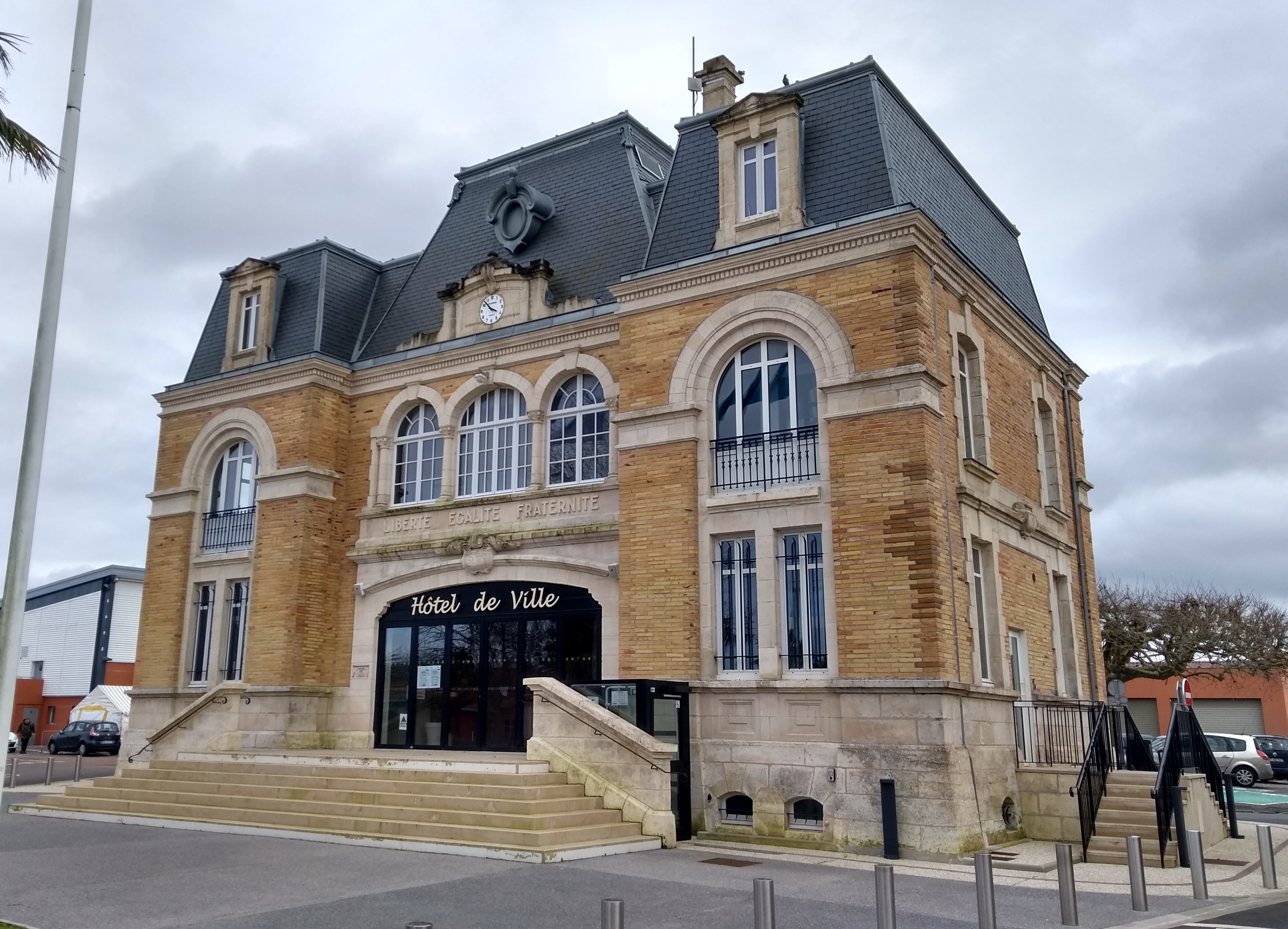
- The main frontage of the Hôtel de Ville in March 2020
- Interactive map of the Hôtel de Ville area

General information
- Type: City hall
- Architectural style: Neoclassical style
- Location: Gujan-Mestras, France
- Coordinates: 44.6359°N 1.0714°W
- Completed: 1931

The Hôtel de Ville (French pronunciation: [otɛl də vil], City Hall) is a municipal building in Gujan-Mestras, Gironde, in southwestern France, standing on Place du Général de Gaulle.

== History ==
Following the French Revolution, the new town council initially met in the house of the mayor at the time. This arrangement continued until 1888 when the council decided to establish a municipal office in a building near the École Élémentaire Louis Pasteur on what is now Allée René Fourgs. In the mid-1920s, following significant population growth largely associated with the oyster farming industry operating in Arcachon Bay, the council led by the mayor, Jules Barat, decided to commission a more substantial town hall. The site they selected was on the south side of what is now Cours de Verdun, some 500 metres (1,600 ft) from the coast. The new building was designed in the neoclassical style, built in brown brick with stone finishings and was officially opened by the under-secretary of state for the navy, Pierre Dignac, on 26 April 1931.

The design involved a symmetrical main frontage of five bays facing onto what is now Place du Général de Gaulle with the end bays projected forward as pavilions. The central section of three bays featured a short flight of steps leading up to a wide segmental-headed opening with a hood mould and a shield above the central bay. On the first floor, there were three round headed windows flanked by columns supporting voussoirs and keystones and, at roof level, there was an entablature, a modillioned cornice and a clock above the central bay. The outer bays featured full-height round-headed recesses containing bi-partite windows on the ground floor and round-headed windows on the first floor. Internally, the principal room was the Salle des Mariages (wedding room).

A war memorial, designed by the sculptors, René Buthaud and Jean-Élie Chaveron, in the form of a bronze statue depicting an angel of victory on a pedestal, was created to commemorate the lives of local service personnel who had died in the First World War and installed in front of the town hall in the 1920s.

A major programme of works to restore the mansard roof was undertaken at a cost of €187,000 and completed in spring 2014. In May 2025, the town hall was lit up in blue to raise awareness of the suffering endured by patients with fibromyalgia.
