= Canton of Gujan-Mestras =

Canton of France

Coordinates: 44.64°N 1.07°W

The canton of Gujan-Mestras is an administrative division of the Gironde department, southwestern France. It was created at the French canton reorganisation which came into effect in March 2015. Its seat is in Gujan-Mestras.

The new canton is included in the arrondissement of Arcachon. The new canton of Gujan-Mestras is made up of communes of the former cantons of La Teste-de-Buch (2 communes) and Audenge (2 communes).

It consists of the following communes of the former cantons of La Teste-de-Buch and Audenge:

1. Gujan-Mestras
2. Marcheprime
3. Mios
4. Le Teich
