= La Teste-de-Buch =

La Teste-de-Buch La Tèsta (Occitan)
- Commune
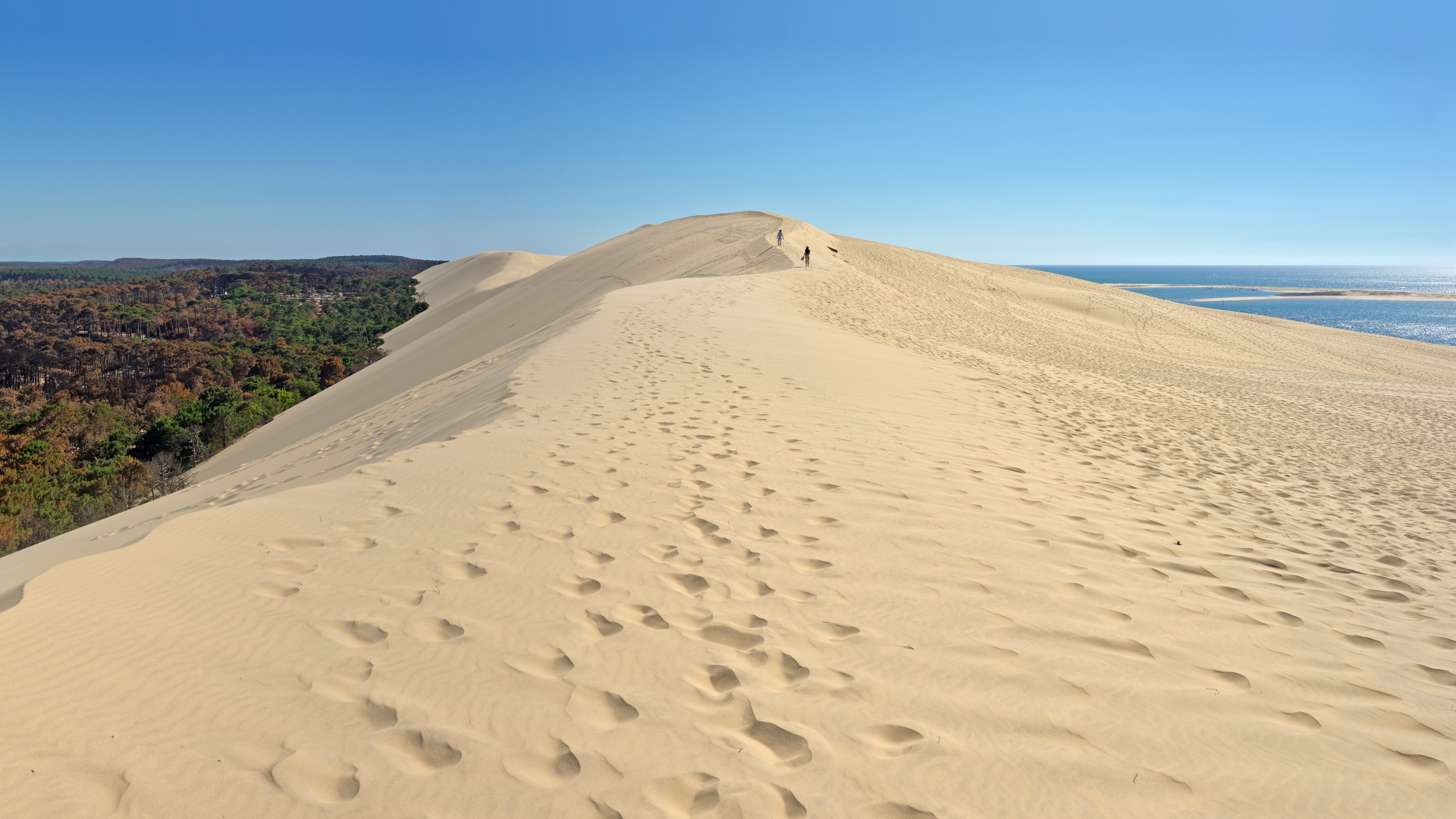
- Dune of Pilat

- Coat of arms
- Location of La Teste-de-Buch
- Location within France Location within Nouvelle-Aquitaine
- Coordinates: 44°37′12″N 1°08′45″W
- Country: France
- Region: Nouvelle-Aquitaine
- Department: Gironde
- Arrondissement: Arcachon
- Canton: La Teste-de-Buch
- Intercommunality: CA Bassin d'Arcachon Sud

Government
  - Mayor (2020–2026): Patrick Davet
- Area^{1}: 180.20 km^{2} (69.58 sq mi)
- Elevation: 4 m (13 ft)
- Highest elevation: 101 m (331 ft)
- Lowest elevation: 0 m (0 ft)
- Population (2023): 27,566
  - Density: 152.97/km^{2} (396.20/sq mi)
- Demonym: Testerins
- Time zone: UTC+01:00 (CET)
  - Summer (DST): UTC+02:00 (CEST)
- INSEE/Postal code: 33529 /33260
- Website: www.latestedebuch.fr
- ^{1} French Land Register data, which excludes lakes, ponds, glaciers > 1 km^{2} (0.386 sq mi or 247 acres) and river estuaries.

La Teste-de-Buch (French pronunciation: [la tɛst də byʃ]; Occitan: La Tèsta (de Bug), [la ˈtɛstə (ðe ˈβyc)]; lit. 'La Teste-of-Buch') is a coastal commune in the Gironde department in the Nouvelle-Aquitaine region in Southwestern France. Until 13 June 1994, it was officially known simply as La Teste.

The commune is located on the south shore of Arcachon Bay (Bassin d'Arcachon) and on the Atlantic coast of France, lying in the southwestern part of Gironde, on the departmental border with Landes. It is the eighth-largest commune in metropolitan France in geographical area at 180.20 km^{2} (69.58 sq mi). It is the largest and most populated of the four communes that make up the Communauté d'agglomération Bassin d'Arcachon Sud (COBAS), which coincides with the urban unit (agglomeration) of La Teste-de-Buch-Arcachon, population 67,563 (2018). As of 2023, the population of the commune was 27,566.

La Teste-de-Buch is famous for the Dune of Pilat (Dune du Pilat), the highest sand dune in Europe.

== History ==
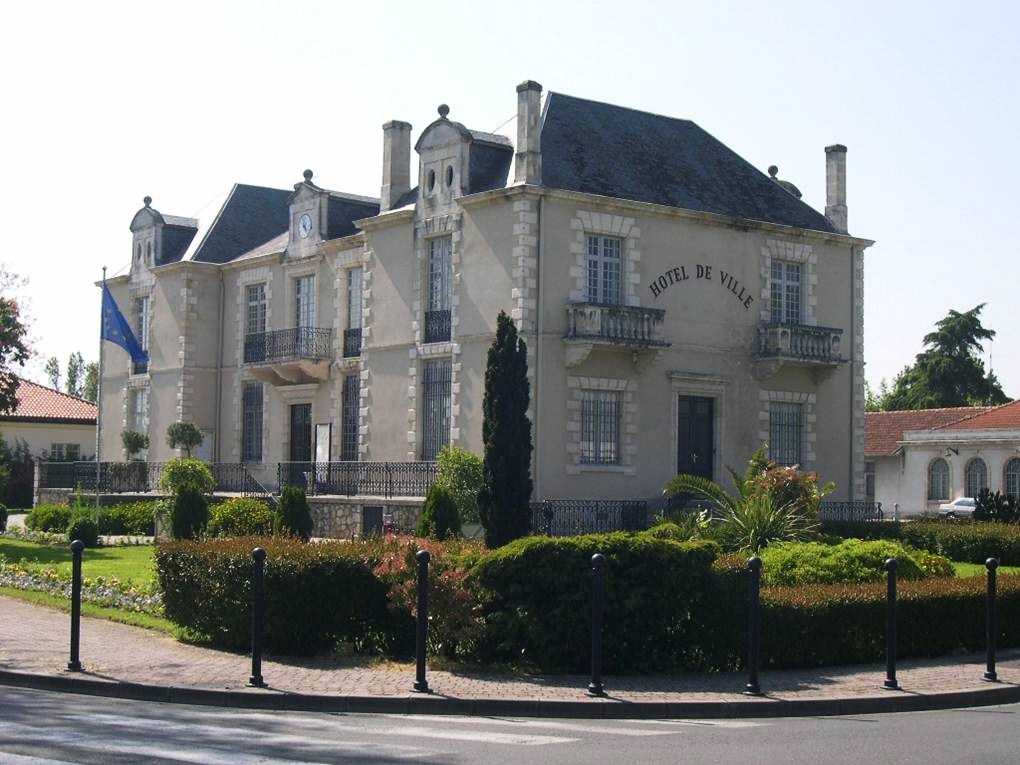
The Hôtel de Ville

The town is the site of a fictional battle during the Napoleonic wars depicted in Sharpe's Siege by Bernard Cornwell.

The Hôtel de Ville was commissioned as a private residence and completed in 1680. The town council relocated to an administrative centre on the opposite side of the road in 2013.

== Geography ==
La Teste-de-Buch is located in the department of Gironde, in the middle of the Landes forest, and south of Arcachon Bay. It is the capital of the Pays de Buch. Neighbouring communes are Gujan-Mestras to the east, Arcachon to the northwest, and Biscarosse and Sanguinet to the south.

The Dune of Pilat is a famous landmark on the Atlantic coast, situated in the western corner of the commune. The seaside resort of Pyla-sur-Mer, the village of Cazaux, the bird refuge and sandbank of Arguin are also part of the town.

The Étang de Cazaux et de Sanguinet is in the southeast corner, astride the departments of Gironde and Landes. The rest of the commune area consists of old dunes, where the natural forest has changed little over centuries.

During World War I, an airfield was created near Cazaux for airplane pilots training (fighters and bombers). Most of the American volunteers pilots of the Lafayette Escadrille came to the "Camp de Cazaux" to finish their training as war pilots. When the U.S entered the war, the 36th Aero Squadron was based here.

== Climate ==
La Teste-de-Buch features an oceanic climate (Cfb) under the Köppen system, closely bordering on a warm-summer mediterranean climate (Csb) due to the lack of rain in July compared to November, the wettest month of the year. Winters are cool and wet, while summers are hot but bearable. However, cold snaps in winter or heat spikes in summer are rare but not unknown.

Climate data for La Teste-de-Buch (1991–2020 averages)
Month	Jan	Feb	Mar	Apr	May	Jun	Jul	Aug	Sep	Oct	Nov	Dec	Year
Record high °C (°F)	22.0 (71.6)	26.2 (79.2)	28.6 (83.5)	33.2 (91.8)	35.1 (95.2)	41.9 (107.4)	42.4 (108.3)	42.0 (107.6)	38.4 (101.1)	33.9 (93.0)	26.3 (79.3)	22.8 (73.0)	42.4 (108.3)
Mean daily maximum °C (°F)	11.2 (52.2)	12.4 (54.3)	15.6 (60.1)	17.7 (63.9)	21.2 (70.2)	24.2 (75.6)	26.2 (79.2)	26.7 (80.1)	24.1 (75.4)	19.9 (67.8)	14.7 (58.5)	11.7 (53.1)	18.8 (65.8)
Daily mean °C (°F)	7.1 (44.8)	7.5 (45.5)	10.2 (50.4)	12.4 (54.3)	15.9 (60.6)	18.9 (66.0)	20.8 (69.4)	21.0 (69.8)	18.2 (64.8)	14.9 (58.8)	10.4 (50.7)	7.7 (45.9)	13.7 (56.7)
Mean daily minimum °C (°F)	2.9 (37.2)	2.6 (36.7)	4.8 (40.6)	7.0 (44.6)	10.6 (51.1)	13.7 (56.7)	15.4 (59.7)	15.2 (59.4)	12.3 (54.1)	9.8 (49.6)	6.0 (42.8)	3.7 (38.7)	8.7 (47.7)
Record low °C (°F)	−15.7 (3.7)	−13.7 (7.3)	−9.6 (14.7)	−3.7 (25.3)	−1.8 (28.8)	3.6 (38.5)	5.0 (41.0)	3.5 (38.3)	−0.7 (30.7)	−4.0 (24.8)	−8.4 (16.9)	−12.5 (9.5)	−15.7 (3.7)
Average precipitation mm (inches)	98.8 (3.89)	73.9 (2.91)	67.2 (2.65)	73.0 (2.87)	62.8 (2.47)	66.3 (2.61)	44.1 (1.74)	60.9 (2.40)	76.0 (2.99)	87.9 (3.46)	127.8 (5.03)	109.4 (4.31)	948.1 (37.33)
Average precipitation days (≥ 1.0 mm)	13.0	10.6	11.1	11.1	8.8	8.0	7.0	7.8	9.2	11.1	14.0	13.1	124.9
Mean monthly sunshine hours	96.7	116.5	174.2	198.9	229.0	243.8	256.2	250.1	213.6	152.7	100.4	89.0	2,120.8
Source: Meteociel

== Demographics ==
Historical population

Year	Pop.	±% p.a.
1793	2,000	—
1800	2,301	+2.02%
1806	2,306	+0.04%
1821	2,409	+0.29%
1831	2,840	+1.66%
1836	2,986	+1.01%
1841	3,447	+2.91%
1846	3,512	+0.37%
1851	3,399	−0.65%
1856	3,891	+2.74%
1861	3,601	−1.54%
1866	4,259	+3.41%
1872	4,462	+0.78%
1876	5,314	+4.47%
1881	6,063	+2.67%
1886	6,200	+0.45%
1891	6,480	+0.89%
1896	6,663	+0.56%
1901	6,840	+0.53%

Year	Pop.	±% p.a.
1906	7,082	+0.70%
1911	7,023	−0.17%
1921	6,321	−1.05%
1926	7,815	+4.33%
1931	8,826	+2.46%
1936	9,496	+1.47%
1946	9,066	−0.46%
1954	11,281	+2.77%
1962	11,085	−0.22%
1968	15,064	+5.24%
1975	15,831	+0.71%
1982	18,038	+1.88%
1990	20,331	+1.51%
1999	22,970	+1.37%
2007	24,616	+0.87%
2012	24,952	+0.27%
2017	26,078	+0.89%
2023	27,566	+0.93%

Source: EHESS and INSEE (1968–2023)

== Economy ==
From the medieval period until the late 1980s, the municipality thrived on resin exploitation.

Today, the primary economic activities of the municipality include tourism, predominantly, along with oyster farming and shipbuilding. Several businesses headquartered in La Teste-de-Buch include, for example, the engine manufacturer Nanni Diesel, the ice cream parlor Ô Sorbet d'amour, and the coffee retailer MaxiCoffee.

The municipality has a delegation from the Bordeaux Chamber of Commerce and Industry.

== Twin towns – sister cities ==
La Teste-de-Buch is twinned with:

- Binghamton, United States
- Chipiona, Spain
- Curepipe, Mauritius
- Schwaigern, Germany

== See also ==
- Arcachon - La Teste-de-Buch Airport
- Pays de Buch
- Communes of the Gironde department
- Forest of Customary Rights of La Teste-de-Buch
