= Dune of Pilat =

Tallest sand dune in Europe

Coordinates: 44°35′24″N 1°12′42″W

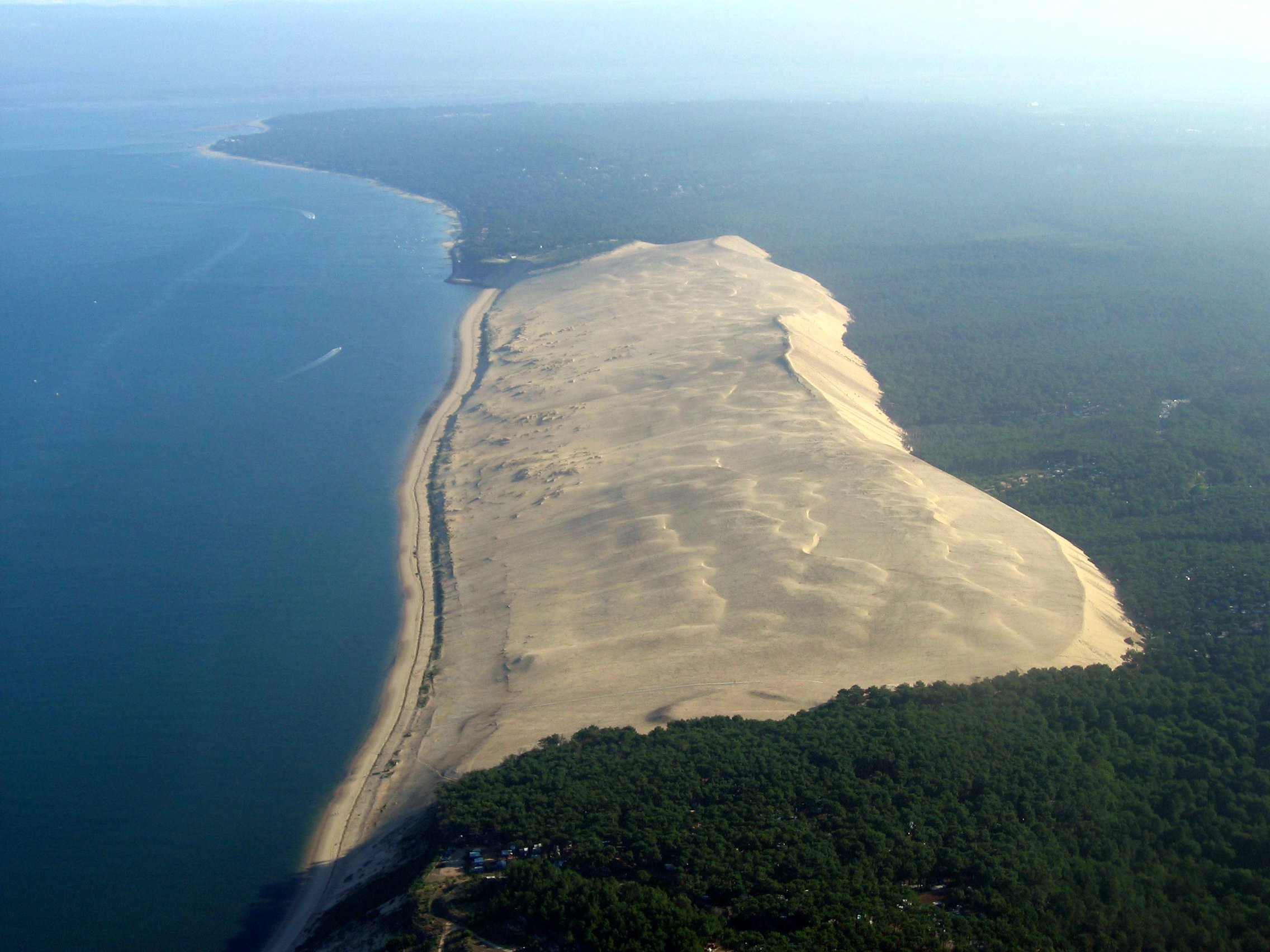
Dune of Pilat, viewed from the South. On the left, the Atlantic Ocean; to the north, in the background, the entrance to Arcachon Bay

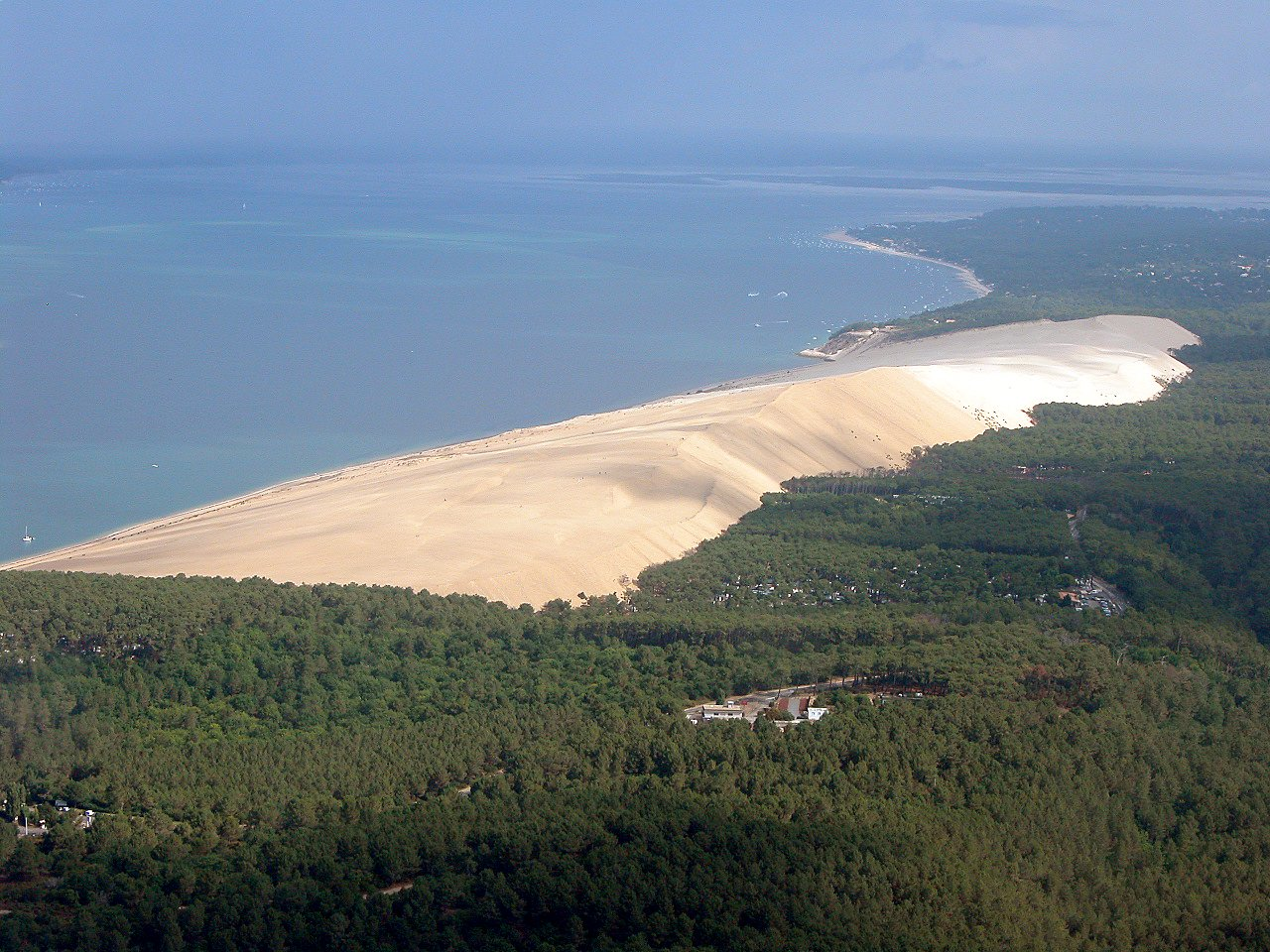
Aerial view of the Dune of Pilat

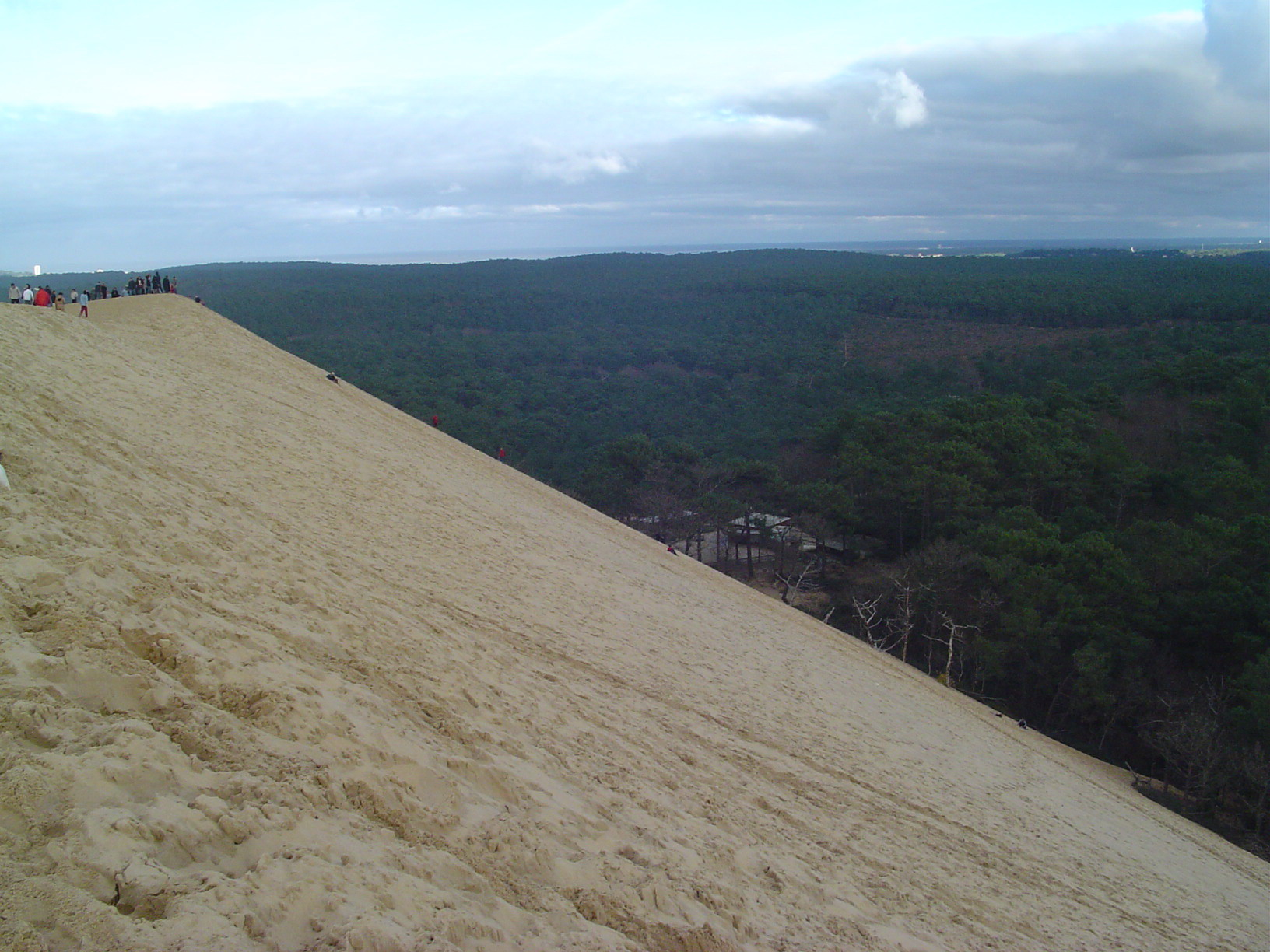
Visitors enjoying the scenery of the Landes from the eastern side and on the crest

The Dune of Pilat (French: Dune du Pilat [dyn dy pila], official name), also called Grande Dune du Pilat, is the tallest sand dune in Europe. It is located in La Teste-de-Buch in the Arcachon Bay area, France, 60 km (37.2 mi) southwest of Bordeaux along France's Atlantic coastlines.

== Location ==
The Dune of Pilat is located at the southern entrance to the Arcachon basin, in the locality of Pyla-sur-Mer, which is administratively dependent on the municipality of La Teste-de-Buch, near Arcachon, in the heart of the Landes de Gascogne.

== Characteristics ==
The dune has a volume of about 60,000,000 m^{3}, measuring around 500 m wide from east to west and 2.7 km in length from north to south (1.35 km^{2}). Its height was 106.60 m above sea level as of 2018.

The dune is considered a foredune, meaning a dune that runs parallel to a shoreline, behind the high tide line of a beach. The dune has been observed to move landward, slowly pushing the forest back to cover houses, roads and portions of the Atlantic Wall. To back this evidence of coastal movement, maps from 1708 and 1786 both place areas with the name Pilat to the south and off-shore of the current dune's location. The area where the dune currently stands was referred to as "Les Sabloneys", or "The New Sands", until the 1930s, when it was renamed by property developer Daniel Meller as the Dune of Pilat. Pilat originates from the Gascon word Pilhar, which refers to a heap or mound.

On 24 January 2009, a peak windspeed of 175 km/h (109 mph) was recorded during a storm at the Dune of Pilat, damaging the dune.

== History ==
The current location of Dune du Pilat housed temporary protohistoric camps for activities related to sea salt mining. The first archaeological discoveries began in 1922. On 31 December 2013, a tourist found a funeral urn and an accessory vase from the Iron Age, 800 years BC in the sand at the foot of the dune.

An excavation site mobilized about ten amateur archaeologists for two weeks in October 2014 to clarify the stratigraphic and environmental context of the reported discoveries.

== Paragliding ==
Due to its exposed location along the sea and steep angle, the Dune of Pilat has become a popular paragliding spot with great soaring conditions.

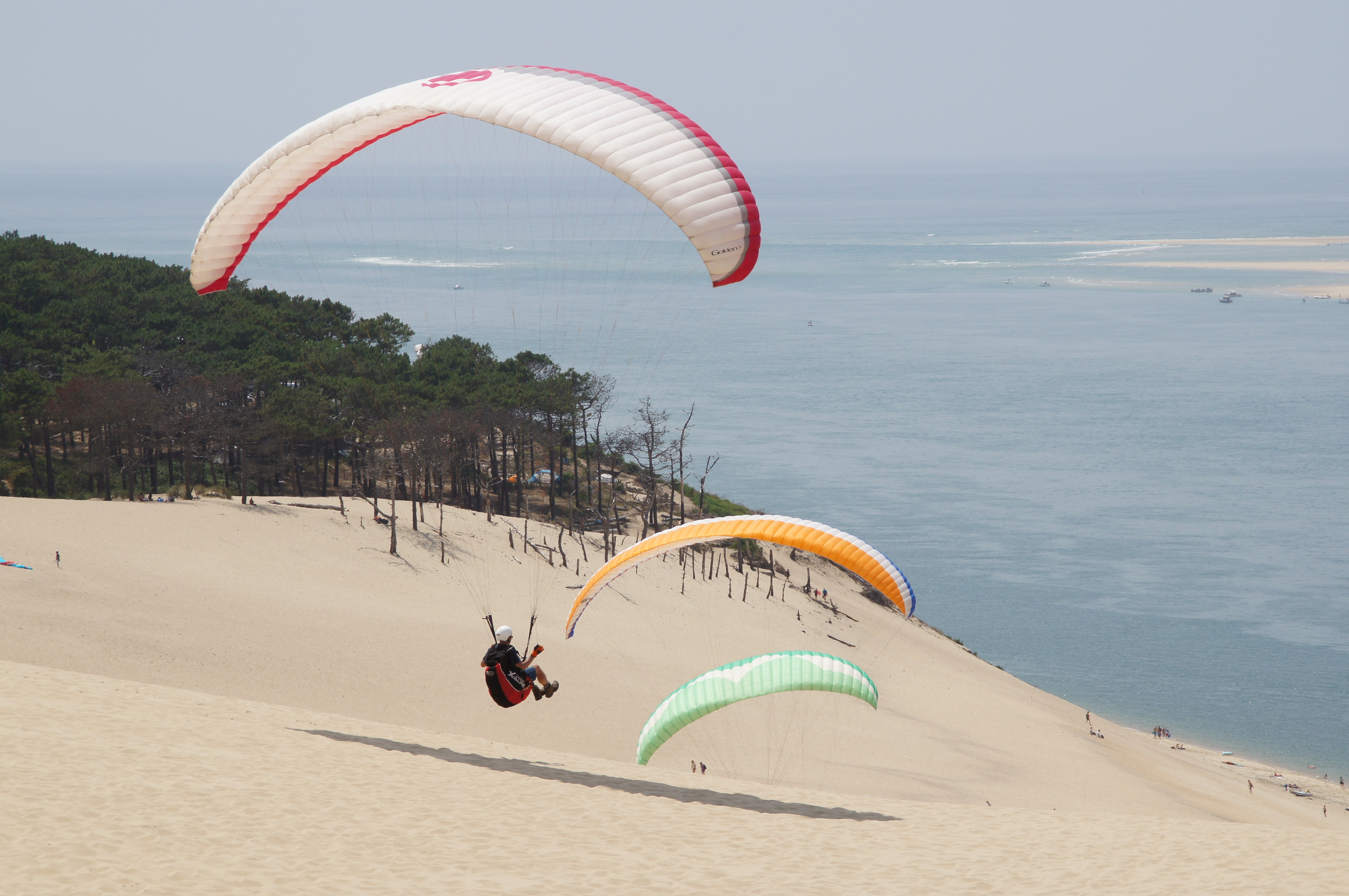
Paragliders above the dune

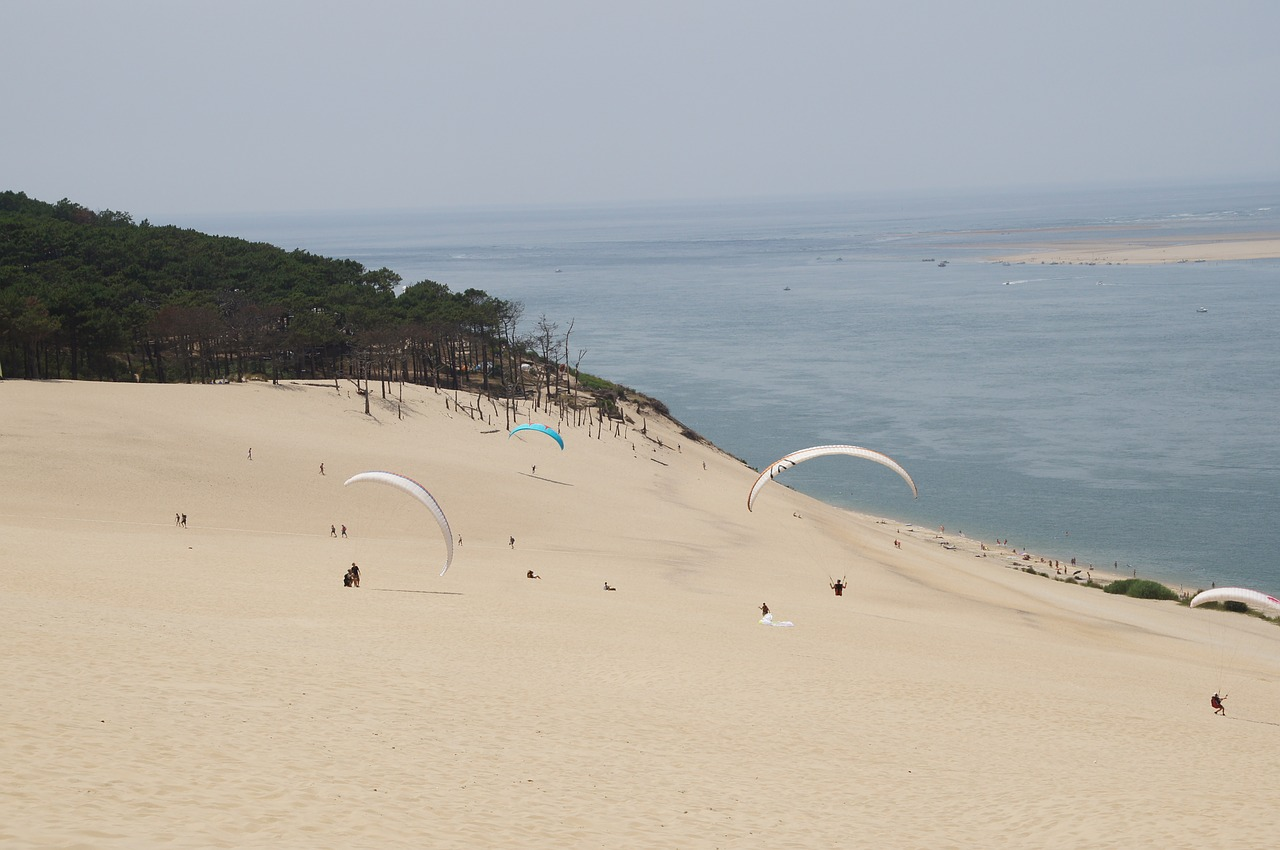
Paragliders above the dune
