= Le Teich =

- Commune
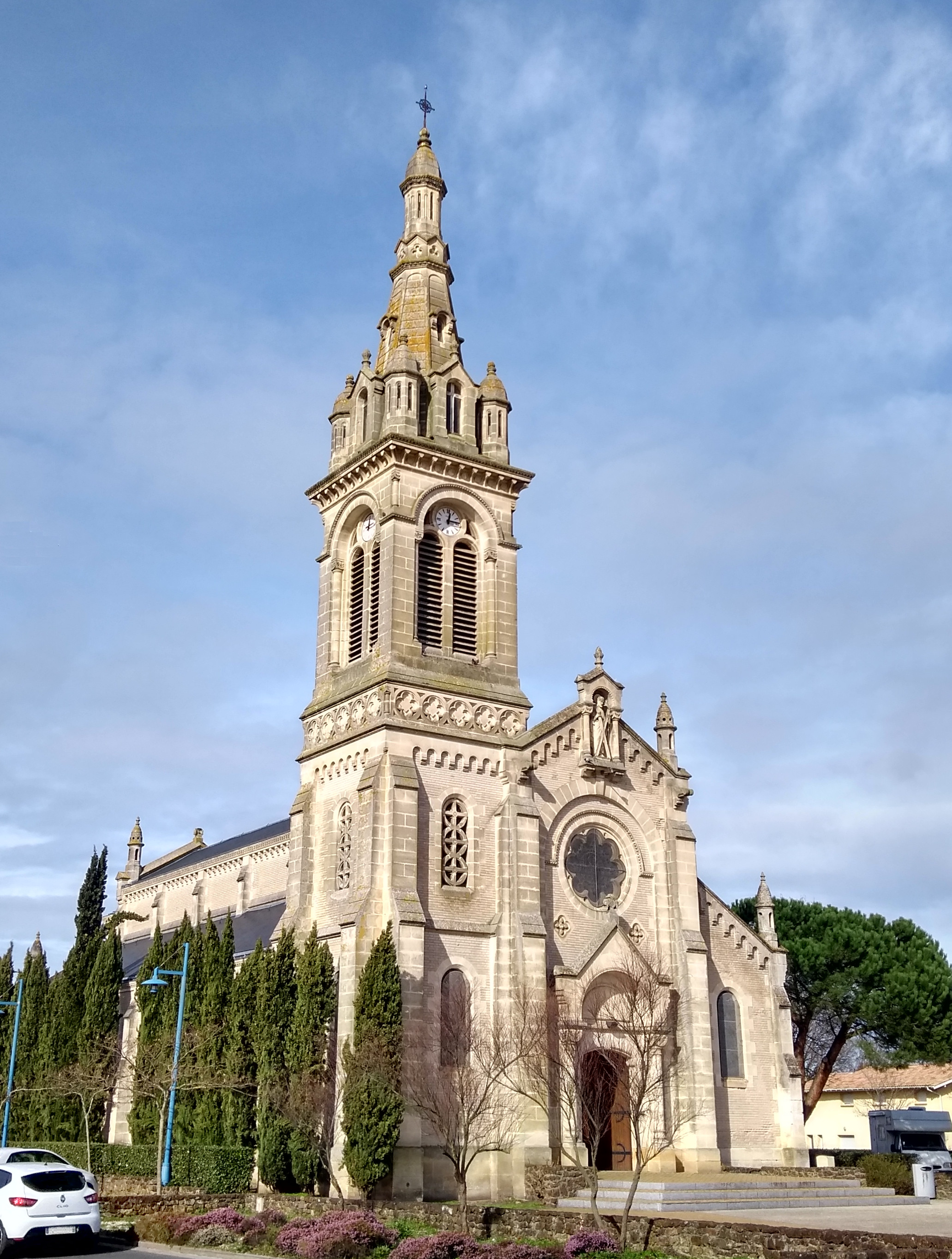
- The church in Le Teich

- Coat of arms
- Location of Le Teich
- Location within France Location within Nouvelle-Aquitaine
- Coordinates: 44°38′05″N 1°01′21″W
- Country: France
- Region: Nouvelle-Aquitaine
- Department: Gironde
- Arrondissement: Arcachon
- Canton: Gujan-Mestras
- Intercommunality: CA Bassin d'Arcachon Sud

Government
  - Mayor (2023–2026): Karine Desmoulin
- Area^{1}: 87.08 km^{2} (33.62 sq mi)
- Elevation: 7 m (23 ft)
- Highest elevation: 35 m (115 ft)
- Lowest elevation: 0 m (0 ft)
- Population (2023): 9,180
  - Density: 105/km^{2} (273/sq mi)
- Time zone: UTC+01:00 (CET)
  - Summer (DST): UTC+02:00 (CEST)
- INSEE/Postal code: 33527 /33470
- ^{1} French Land Register data, which excludes lakes, ponds, glaciers > 1 km^{2} (0.386 sq mi or 247 acres) and river estuaries.

Le Teich (French pronunciation: [lə tɛʃ]) is a commune in the Gironde department in Nouvelle-Aquitaine in southwestern France.

In this commune, there is a park created in order to observe birds without putting them in danger.

== Population ==
Historical population
Year	Pop.	±% p.a.
1968	1,680	—
1975	2,176	+3.76%
1982	2,946	+4.42%
1990	3,607	+2.56%
1999	4,822	+3.28%
2007	6,284	+3.37%
2012	6,891	+1.86%
2017	7,906	+2.79%
2023	9,180	+2.52%
Source: INSEE

== Twin towns – sister cities ==
- Briones, Spain, since 2007

== See also ==
- Communes of the Gironde department
- Parc naturel régional des Landes de Gascogne
