= Lanton, Gironde =

Lanton
- Commune
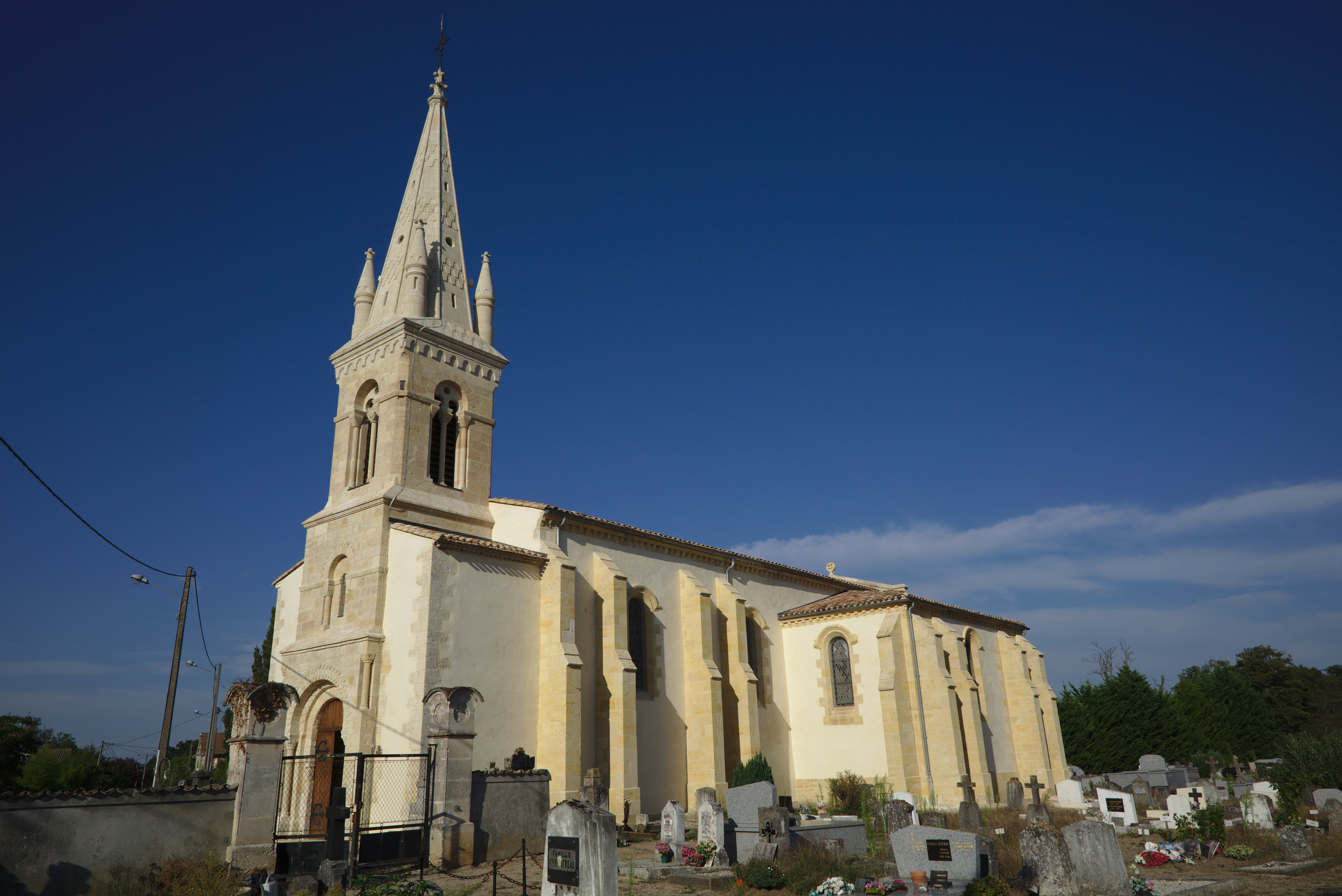
- The church in Lanton

- Coat of arms
- Location of Lanton
- Location within France Location within Nouvelle-Aquitaine
- Coordinates: 44°42′17″N 1°02′03″W
- Country: France
- Region: Nouvelle-Aquitaine
- Department: Gironde
- Arrondissement: Arcachon
- Canton: Andernos-les-Bains
- Intercommunality: CA Bassin d'Arcachon Nord

Government
  - Mayor (2020–2026): Marie Larrue
- Area^{1}: 136.19 km^{2} (52.58 sq mi)
- Highest elevation: 54 m (177 ft)
- Lowest elevation: 1 m (3.3 ft)
- Population (2023): 7,337
  - Density: 53.87/km^{2} (139.5/sq mi)
- Time zone: UTC+01:00 (CET)
  - Summer (DST): UTC+02:00 (CEST)
- INSEE/Postal code: 33229 /33138
- ^{1} French Land Register data, which excludes lakes, ponds, glaciers > 1 km^{2} (0.386 sq mi or 247 acres) and river estuaries.

Lanton (French pronunciation: [lɑ̃tɔ̃]; Occitan: Lenton) is a commune in the Gironde department in Nouvelle-Aquitaine in southwestern France.

Its inhabitants are called Lantonais.

== Geography ==
=== Location ===
Lanton is located on the northern shore of the Arcachon Bay, in the Pays de Buch region. It is made up of four villages: Blagon, Taussat, Cassy and Lanton (the main village).

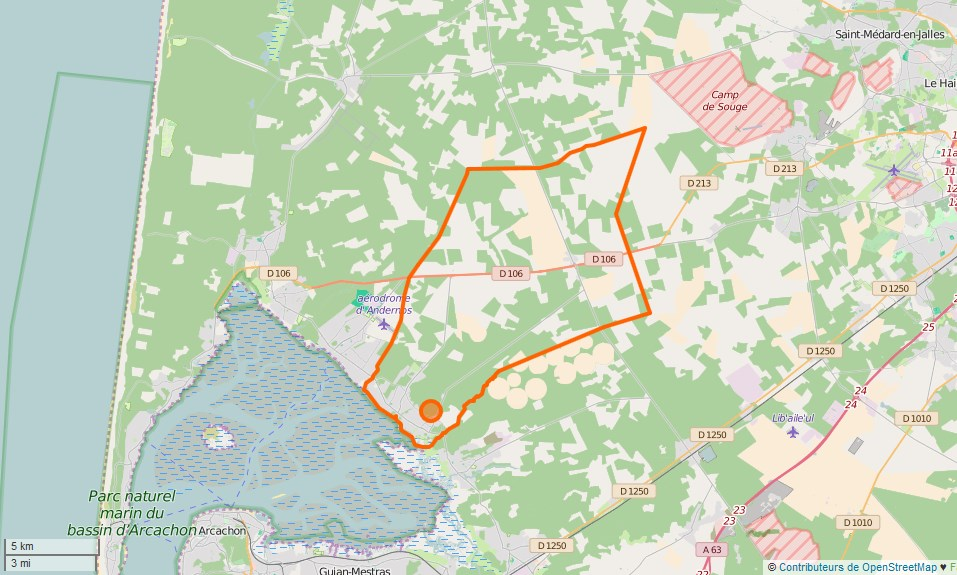
Communal boundary.

=== Neighboring communes ===
The neighboring communes are Andernos-les-Bains, Arès, Audenge, Le Temple and Saint-Jean-d'Illac.

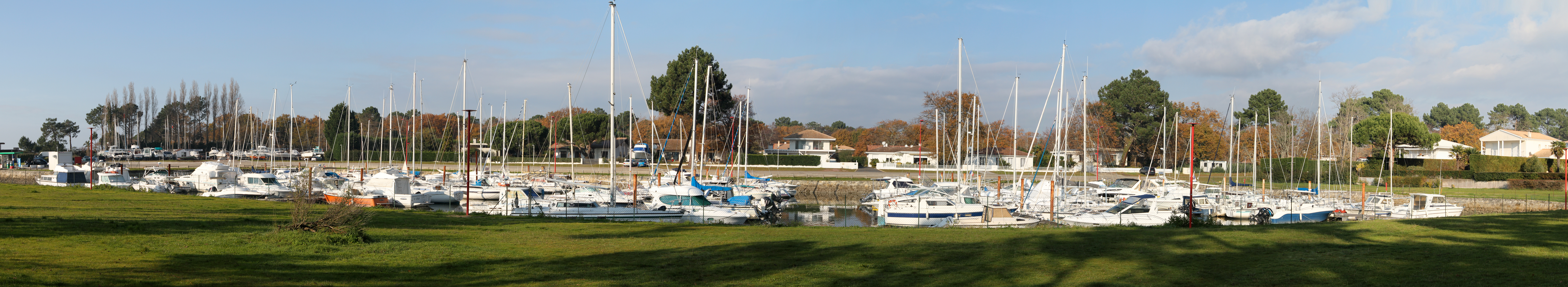
Taussat Port

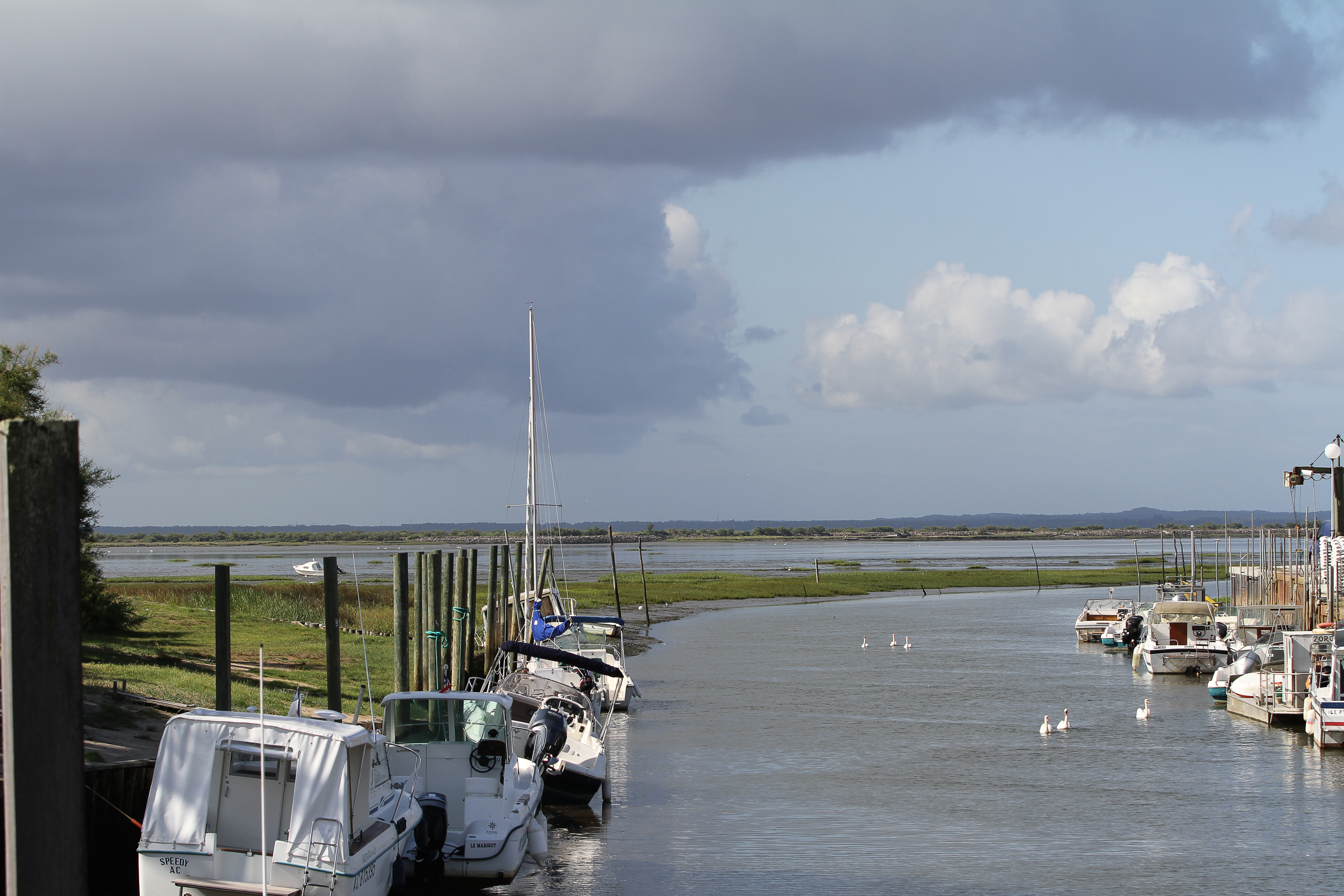
Cassy Port

=== Climate ===
Historically, the commune has been exposed to an Aquitaine oceanic climate. In 2020, Météo-France published a typology of climates in metropolitan France, in which the commune is exposed to an oceanic climate and is located in the Littoral Charente et Aquitaine climate region, characterized by high rainfall in autumn and winter, good sunshine, mild winters (6.5 °C), and sea breezes.

For the period 1971–2000, the average annual temperature was 13 °C, with an annual temperature range of 13.8 °C. The average annual cumulative precipitation was 951 mm, with 12.9 days of precipitation in January and 7 days in July. For the period 1991-2020, the average annual temperature observed at the nearest weather station, located in the commune of La Teste-de-Buch at 19.77 km as the crow flies, is 0.0 °C and the average annual cumulative precipitation is 0.0 mm. For the future, the climatic parameters of the commune estimated for 2050 according to different greenhouse gas emission scenarios can be consulted on a dedicated site published by Météo-France in November 2022.

== Urban planning ==
=== Typology ===
As of 1 January 2024, Lanton is categorized as a small town, according to the new seven-level communal density grid defined by INSEE in 2022. It belongs to the urban unit of Andernos-les-Bains, an intra-departmental agglomeration grouping two municipalities, of which it is a suburban commune. Furthermore, the municipality is part of the Bordeaux catchment area, of which it is a suburban commune. This area, which includes 275 communes, is categorized as an area with 700,000 inhabitants or more (excluding Paris).

The commune, bordered by the Atlantic Ocean, is also a coastal commune within the meaning of the law of 3 January 1986, known as the Coastal Law. Specific urban planning provisions therefore apply in order to preserve natural spaces, sites, landscapes and the ecological balance of the coastline, such as the principle of non-constructibility, outside urbanized areas, on the 100-meter coastal strip, or more if the local urban planning plan so provides.

=== Land use ===
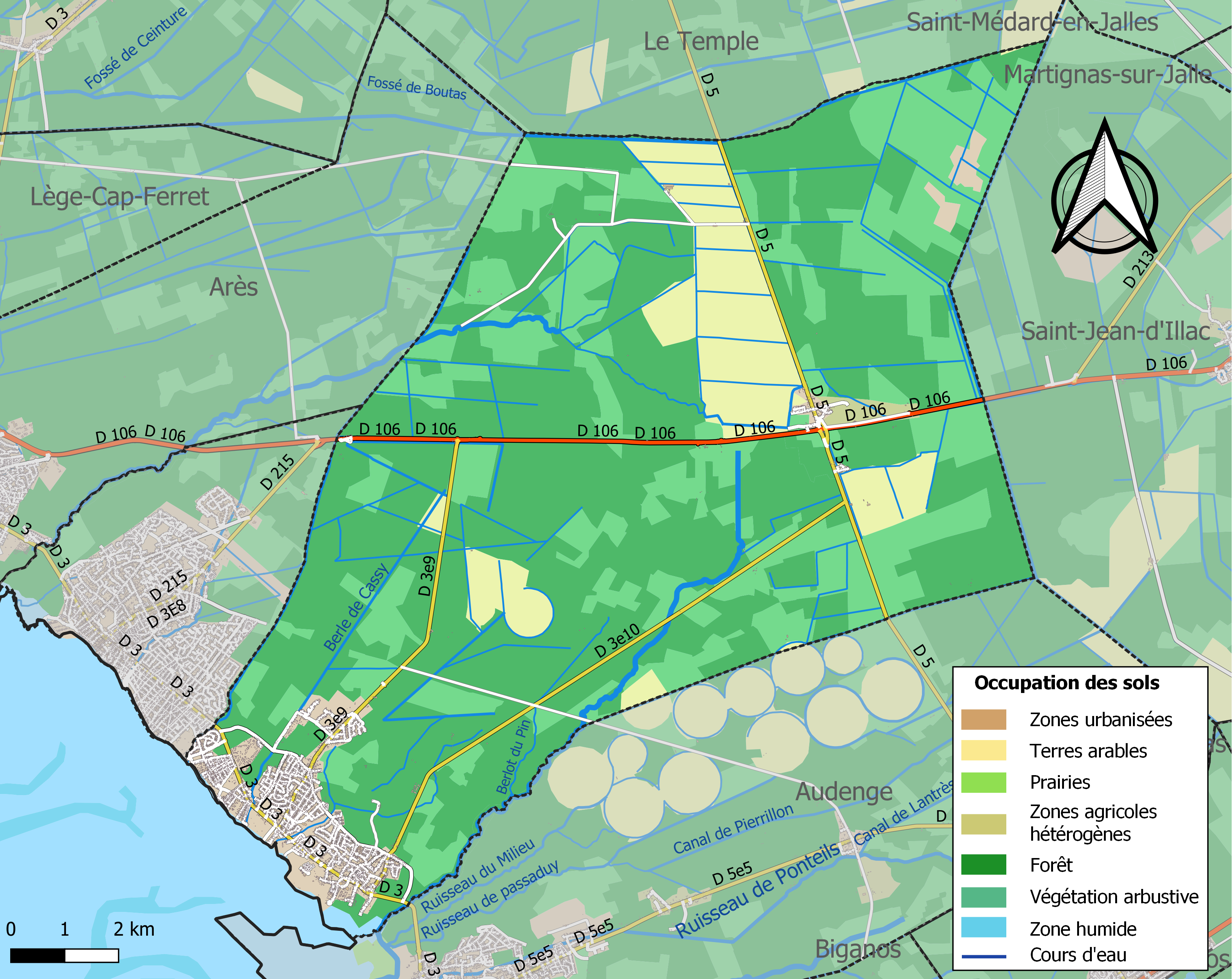
Map of infrastructure and land use in the municipality in 2018 (CLC).

The land use of the municipality, as shown in the European biophysical land use database Corine Land Cover (CLC), is marked by the importance of forests and semi-natural environments (84.1% in 2018), a decrease compared to 1990 (85.6%). The detailed breakdown in 2018 is as follows: forests (56%), environments with shrub and/or herbaceous vegetation (28.1%), arable land (9.7%), urbanized areas (4.8%), industrial or commercial areas and communication networks (0.5%), heterogeneous agricultural areas (0.5%), coastal wetlands (0.3%), artificialized green spaces, non-agricultural (0.1%). The evolution of the land use of the commune and its infrastructure can be observed on the various cartographic representations of the territory: the Cassini map (18th century), the general staff map (1820-1866) and the IGN maps or aerial photos for the current period (1950 to today).

=== Major risks ===
The territory of the commune of Lanton is vulnerable to various natural hazards: weather (storms, thunderstorms, snow, extreme cold, heatwaves, or drought), floods, forest fires, and earthquakes (very low seismicity). A website published by BRGM allows for a quick and easy assessment of the risks of a property located either by address or by plot number.

The commune is part of the Arcachon High Flood Risk Area (TRI), which includes the 10 communes in the Arcachon Basin affected by a risk of marine submersion. This is one of the 18 TRIs that were established at the end of 2012 in the Adour-Garonne basin. In the 20th and 21st centuries, the significant events were those of 1882, 1896, 1897, then 1924, 1951, 1984 and 1999. In the 20th century, the storms Klaus, between 23 and 25 January 2009, and Xynthia on 27 and 28 February 2010, left their mark. Floodplain maps have been drawn up for three scenarios: frequent (flood with a return time of 10 to 30 years), medium (return time of 100 to 300 years) and extreme (return time of around 1,000 years, which would undermine any protection system). The commune has been declared a natural disaster area due to damage caused by floods and mudslides in 1982, 1999, 2003, 2009, 2013, and 2020.

Lanton is at risk of forest fires. Since 20 April 2016, the departments of Gironde, Landes, and Lot-et-Garonne have had interdepartmental regulations for forest fire protection. These regulations aim to better prevent forest fires, facilitate service interventions, and limit their consequences, whether through clearing, limiting the spread of fire, or regulating forest activities. In particular, it defines five increasing levels of vigilance, with various associated measures. In terms of land use planning, the commune has a forest fire risk prevention plan (PPRIF).

Furthermore, to better understand the risk of land subsidence, the national inventory of underground cavities allows us to locate those located in the commune.

Regarding landslides, the commune was declared to be in a state of natural disaster due to damage caused by landslides in 1999.

== Name ==
The place name is documented in the forms Lento in Bagio (read in Bogio), Lenton (1235), de Casse and de Taussac (1235). It is locally pronounced (Occitan pronunciation: [lɵnˈtuŋ]) in accordance with the Gascon dialect.

Its origin is believed to come from the personal name Lentus, attested in Aquitaine.

The restored place name is Lenton.

== History ==
The Notre-Dame de Lanton church dates back to the 12th century. It is one of the oldest in the area. It is located on the coastal route of the Santiago de Compostela.

For more information on the town in the 18th century, see the work of Jacques Baurein.

The town hosted the landing of the record-breaking balloon, the Zenith, in 1875.

== Heraldry ==
Cut, the first gules with a scythe or, the iron turned sinister, the second azure with a boarding anchor argent; with a cotice in bar argent overlapping the partition; with a parasol pine proper overlapping overall.

== Demographics ==
Historical population

Year	Pop.	±% p.a.
1793	500	—
1861	638	+0.36%
1901	871	+0.78%
1962	1,401	+0.78%
1968	1,567	+1.88%
1975	1,668	+0.90%
1982	2,535	+6.16%

Year	Pop.	±% p.a.
1990	3,734	+4.96%
1999	4,962	+3.21%
2007	5,966	+2.33%
2012	6,384	+1.36%
2017	6,912	+1.60%
2023	7,337	+1.00%

Source: EHESS and INSEE (1968-2023)

== Economy ==
The economy in Lanton and the surrounding Gironde has historically consisted of agricultural and fishing. The region has an established wine industry, and oyster farms. Tourism has become a larger part of the economy over the years due to the proximity to the coast and pristine beaches and countryside.

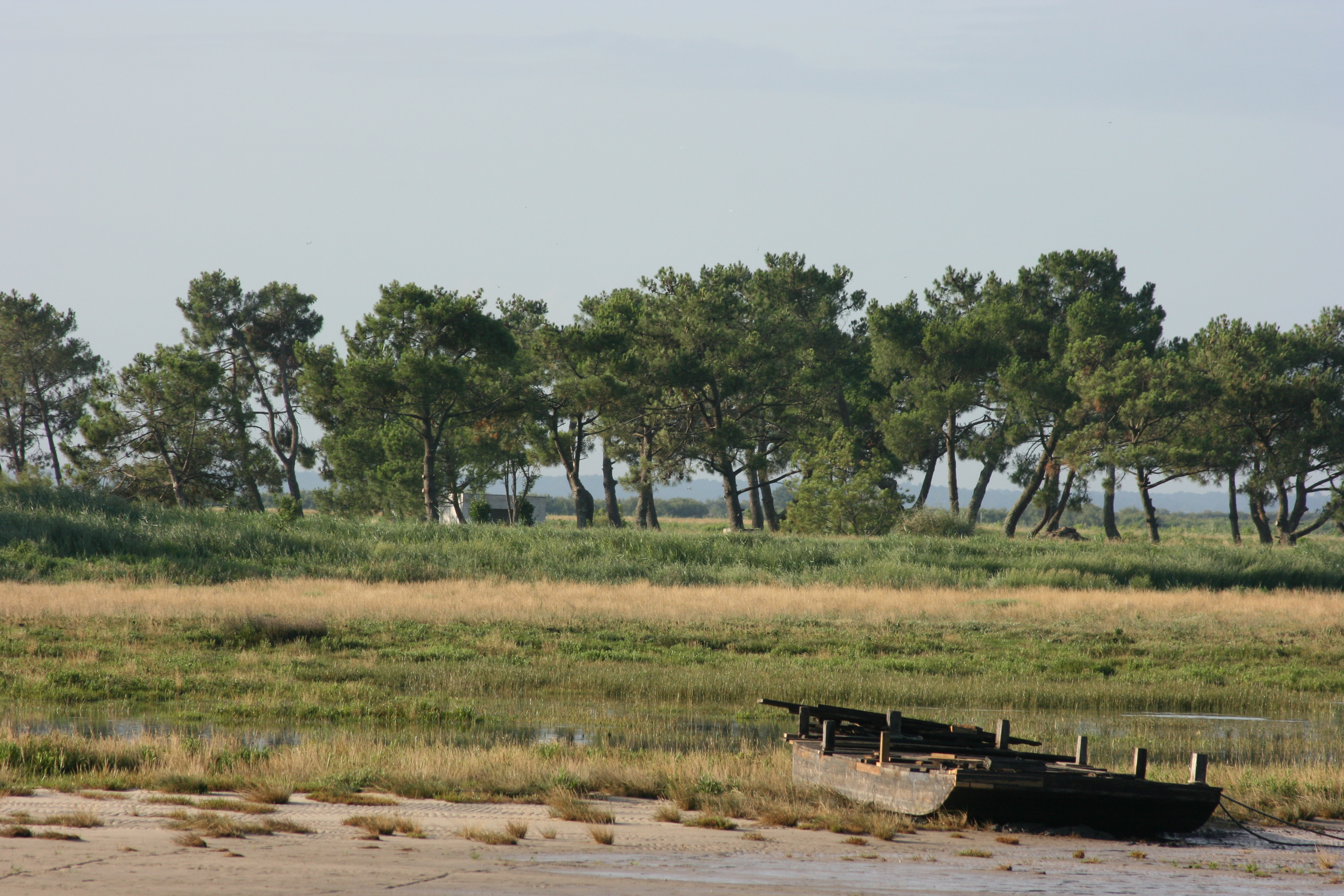
Traditional oyster farmers' boat on the Arcachon Bay, seen from Suzette beach.

== Notable people ==
Personalities linked to the commune include:

- The painter Toulouse-Lautrec's first stay was in the summer of 1885, with the Würtz family in Andernos. From 1891 onwards, he returned regularly to Taussat to the Villa Bagatelle of his friend Fabre until his death in 1901 and wrote his last letter to his mother there in August. It is said that he raised cormorants for fishing.
- The writer François Mauriac came regularly to see his sister there.
- Henriette Lambert, a painter born in Bordeaux, lives in the village of Cassy.

== Twin towns ==
- Lodosa, Spain since 1993
- Ameglia, Italy since 2007

== Gallery ==
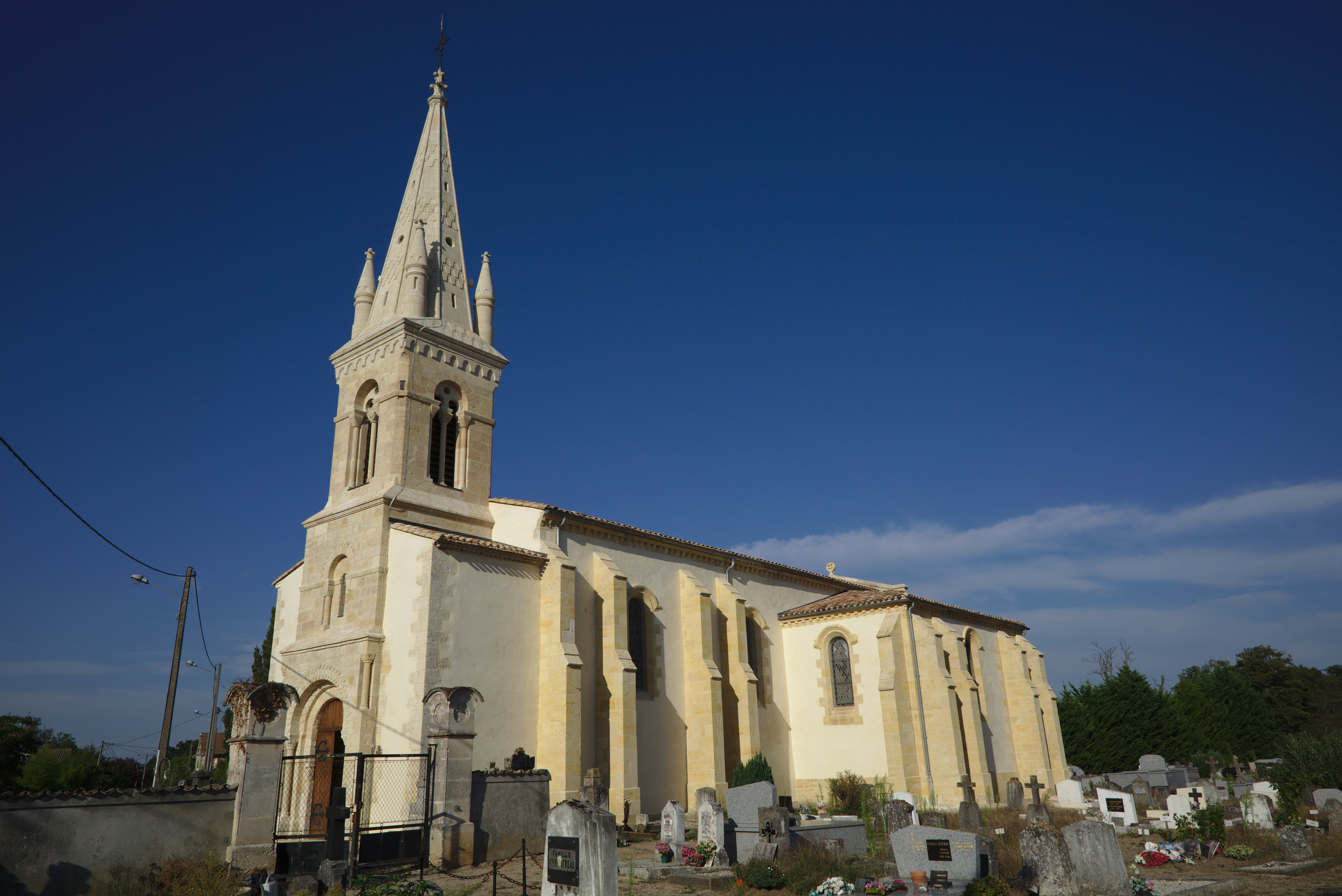
Exterior view of the church.

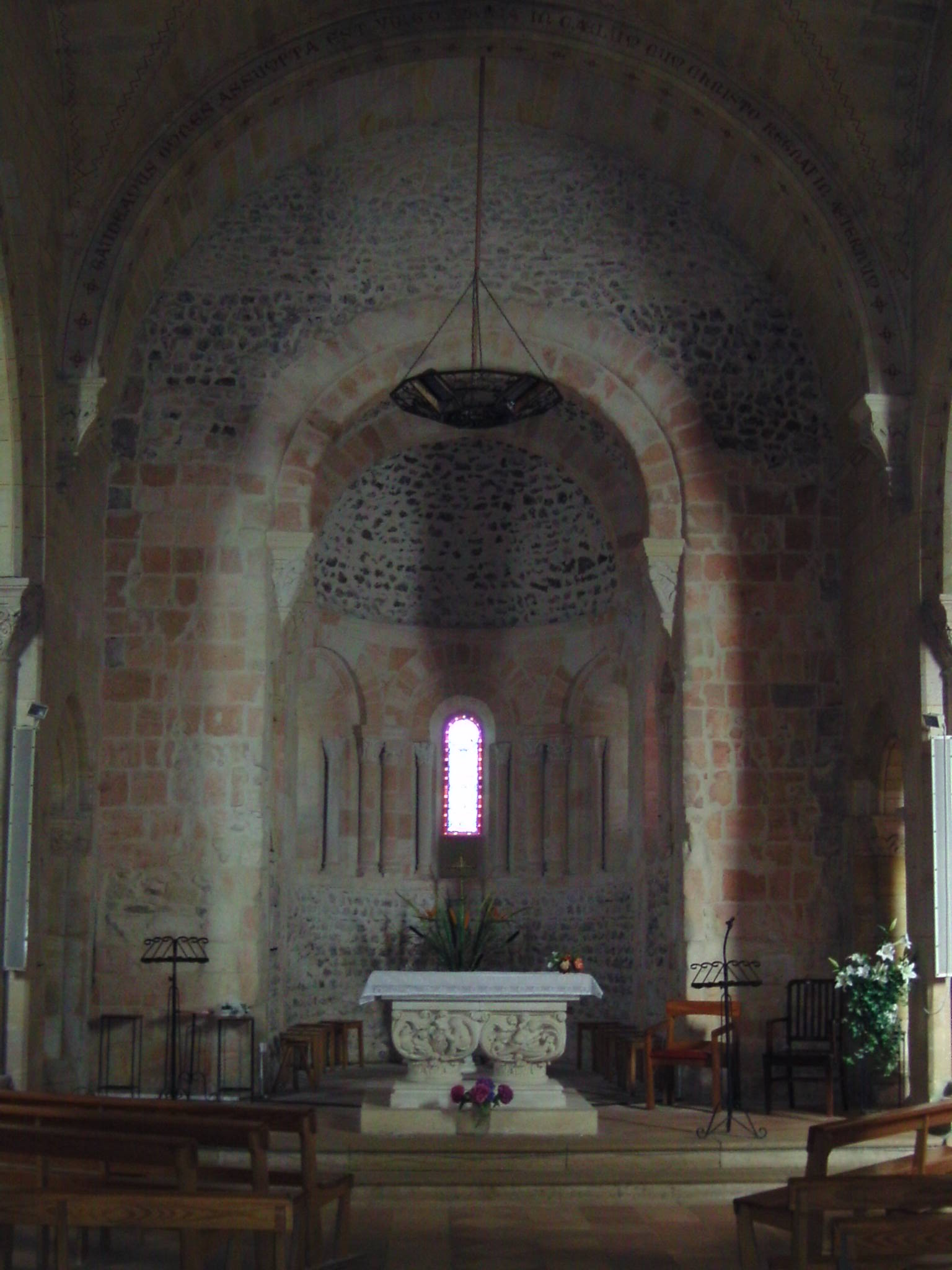
Interior of the church.

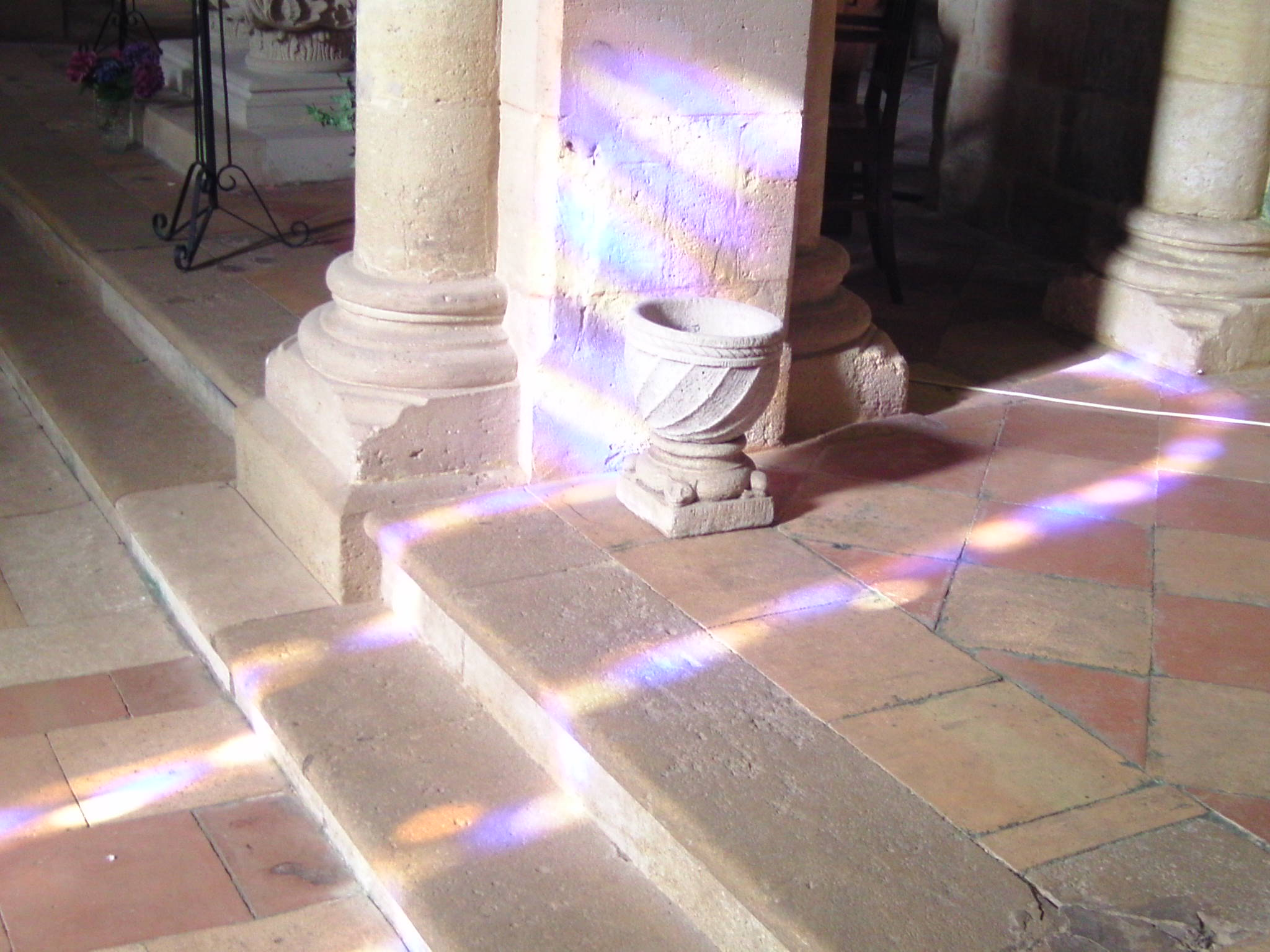
Interior of the church.

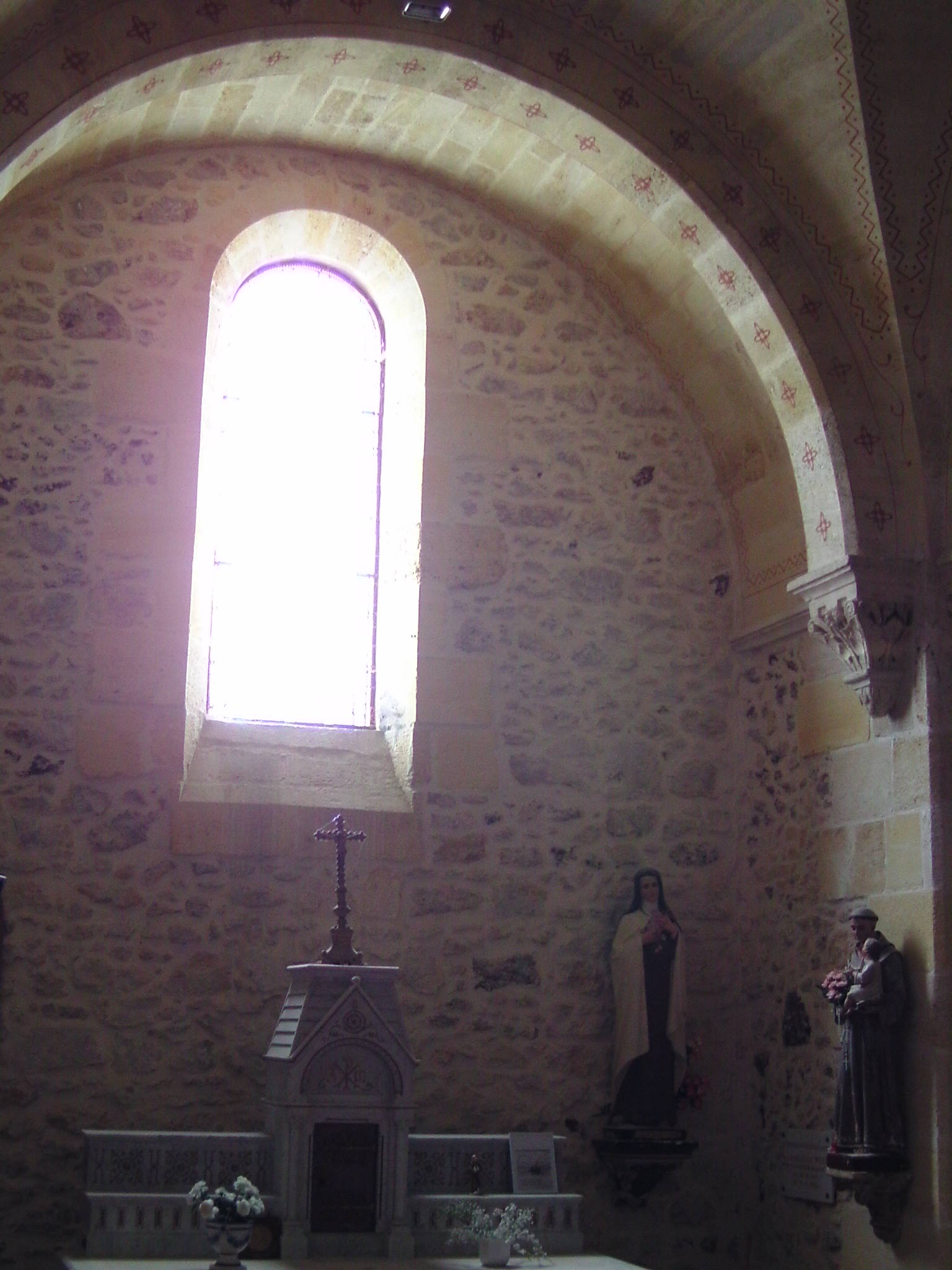
Interior with a skylight in the church.

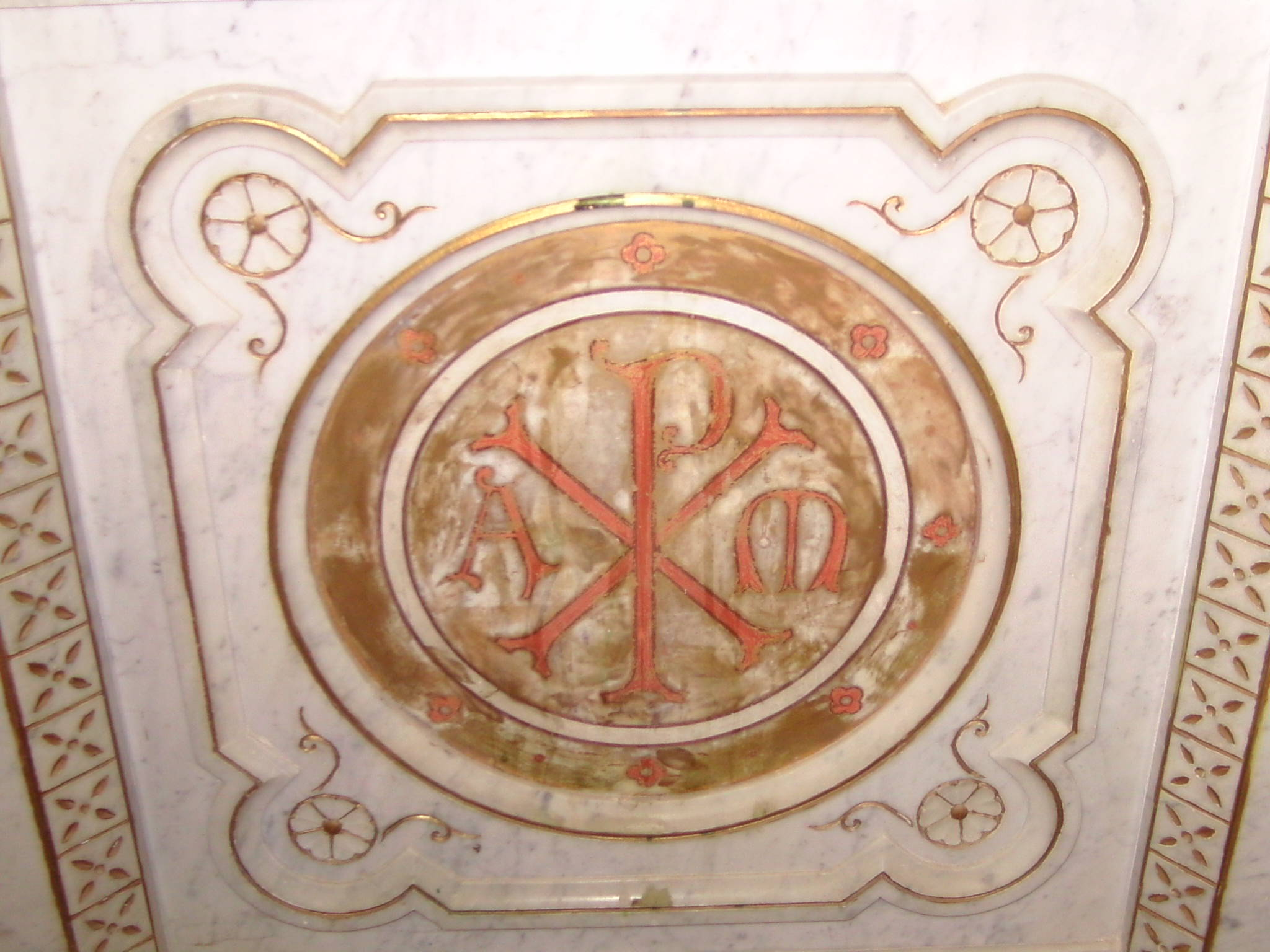
Chrism in the church.

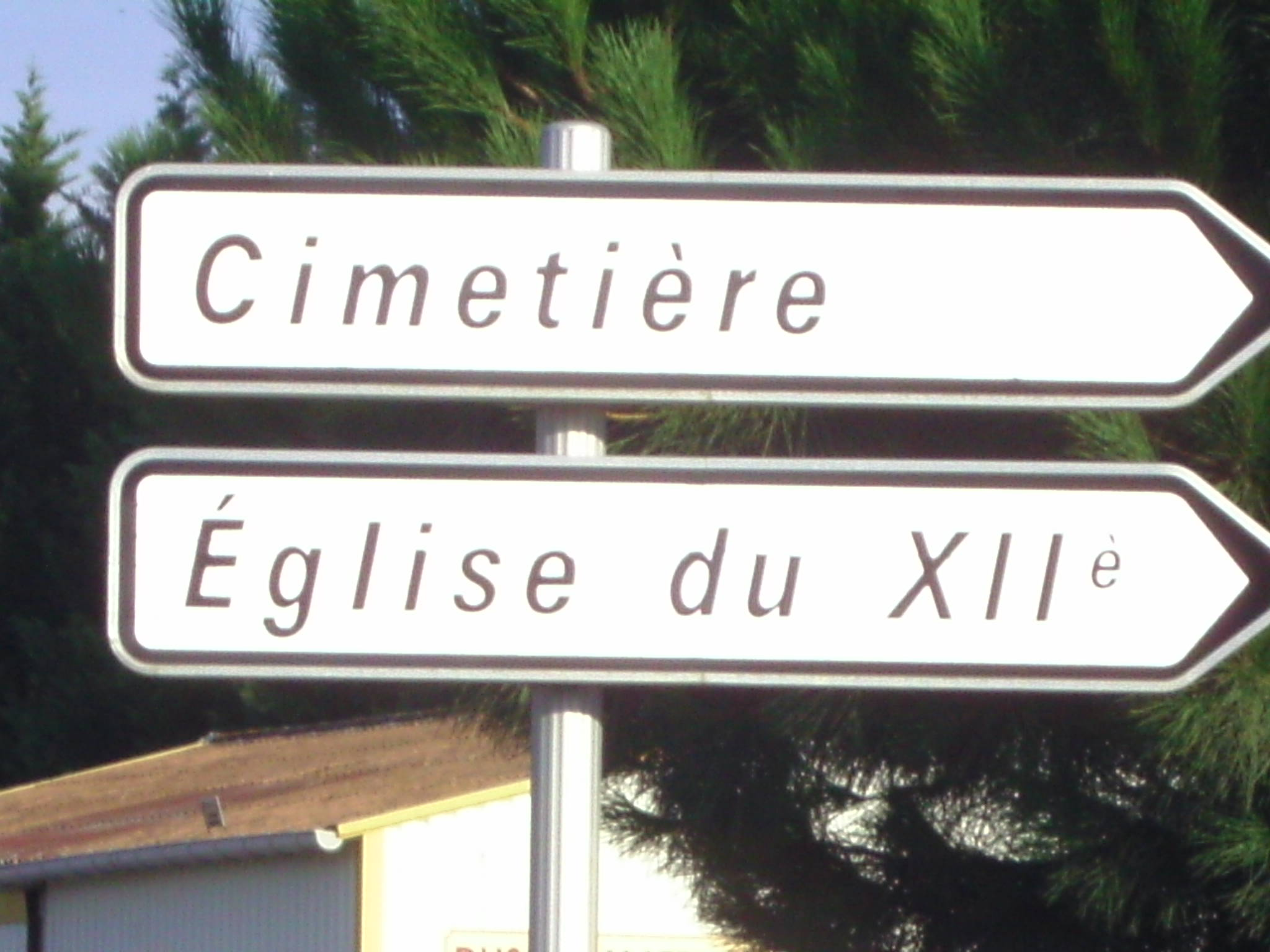
Signpost for the 12th century church and cemetery.

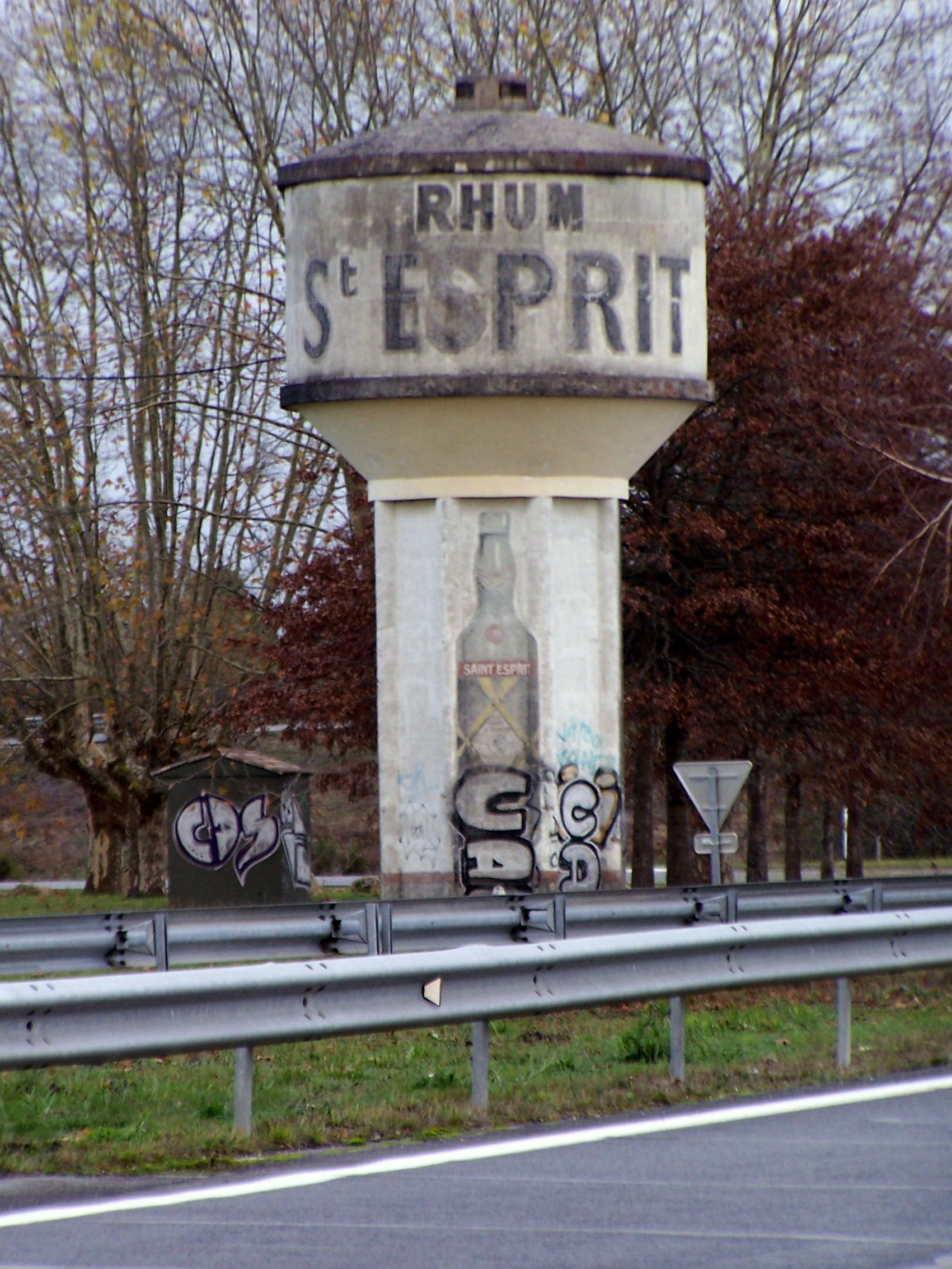
The Blagon water tower.

== See also ==
- Communes of the Gironde department
