= Tramway du Cap-Ferret =

Narrow gauge railway in France

Coordinates: 44°39′23.96″N 1°14′23.87″W

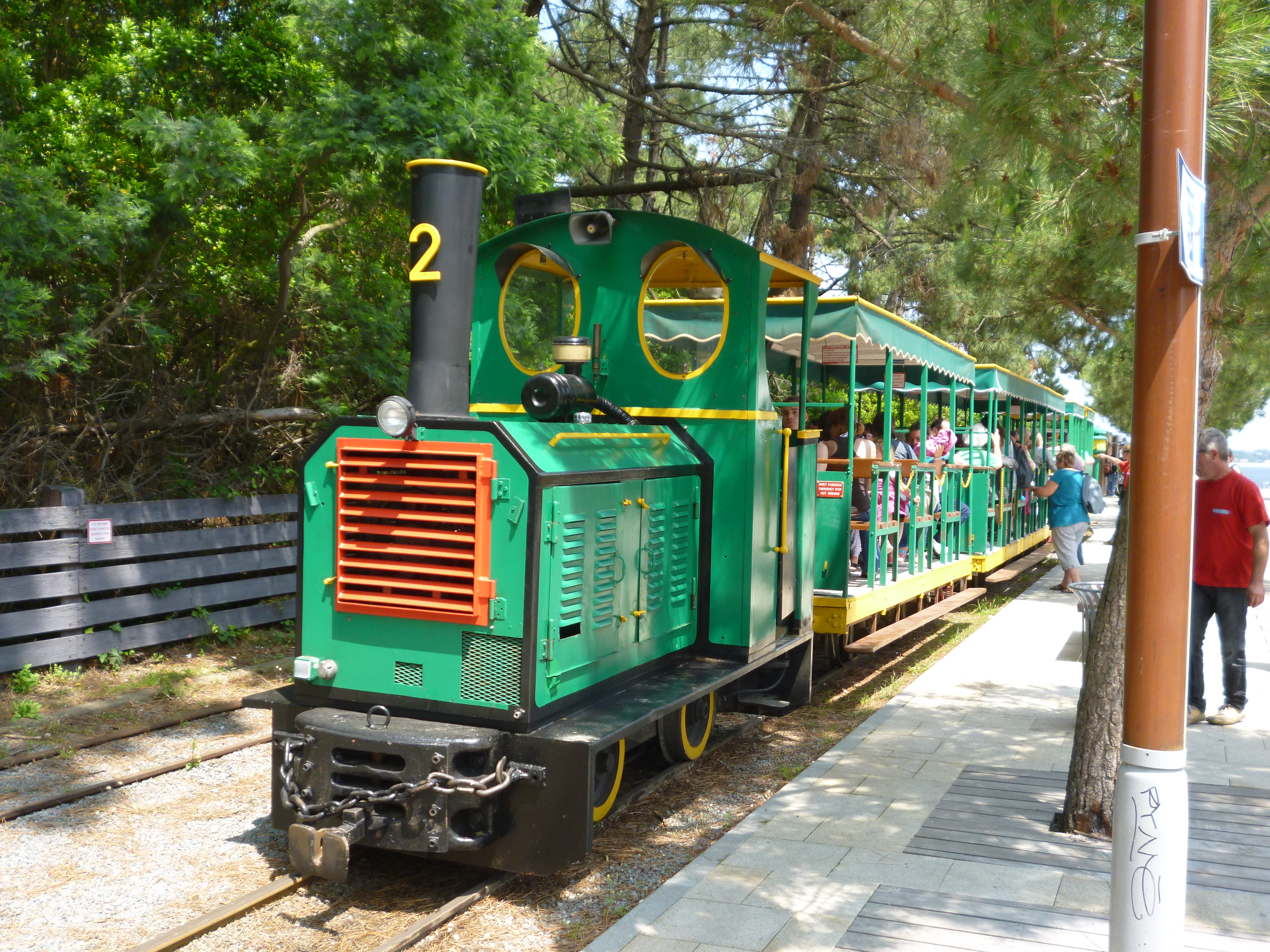
- Train at Belisarius

Overview
- Status: Operational
- Locale: Cap Ferret, Gironde, France
- Termini: Plage de l'horizon; Jetée de Bélisaire

Service
- Type: Light railway

Technical
- Line length: 2 km (1.2 mi)
- Number of tracks: Single track
- Track gauge: 600 mm (1 ft 11 5/8 in)

The Tramway du Cap-Ferret (French pronunciation: [tʁamwɛ dy kap fɛʁɛ]), also known as the Petit train du Cap-Ferret ([pəti tʁɛ̃ dy-]), is a 600 mm (1 ft 11 5/8 in) narrow gauge railway on the Atlantic coast of France in the department of Gironde. The tramway is situated on the Cap Ferret, a peninsular that which divides the Atlantic Ocean from Arcachon Bay, and links the shores of the bay with the beaches on the Atlantic coast.

The line first operated in 1879 and was originally pulled by a horse. Locomotives took over in 1925, but the service ceased in 1935. In 1952, the service was restarted in its current form. In 1989, the train was acquired by the commune of Lège-Cap-Ferret.

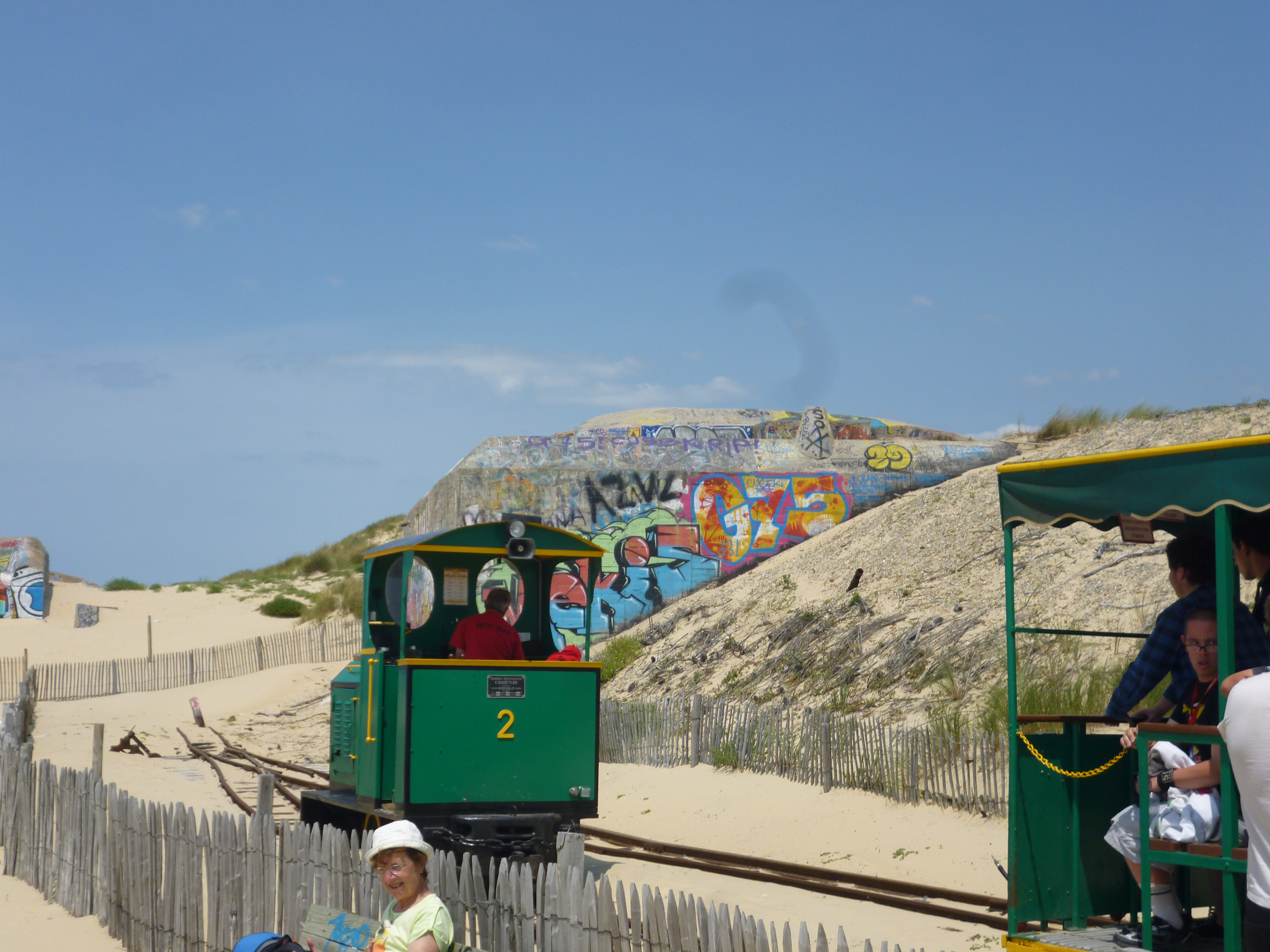
The beach terminus

The line is some 2 kilometres (1.2 mi) long and connects the beach at Plage de l'horizon on the Atlantic coast with the jetty at Jetée de Bélisaire on Arcachon Bay. It operates every afternoon from April to September, with services running every 30 minutes or less, and with some morning services in the peak summer season. Ferries connect the Jetée de Bélisaire with the resort town of Arcachon on the other side of Arcachon Bay.

Trains are operated by open-sided coaches hauled by diesel locomotives, and the line is largely situated along the road side. At the beach terminus, remains of the Atlantic Wall can be seen.

== Bibliography ==
- Jean Desrentes, Le petit train des dunes, Société Historique et Archéologique d’Arcachon et du Pays de Buch, n° 93, 3ème trimestre 1997, p. 58 à 70 (in French)
- Luc Dupuyoo, Jadis et naguère... les petits trains du Cap-Ferret, Confluence, Bordeaux, 2007, ISBN 978-2-914240-99-4 (in French)
