= Marcheprime =

- Commune
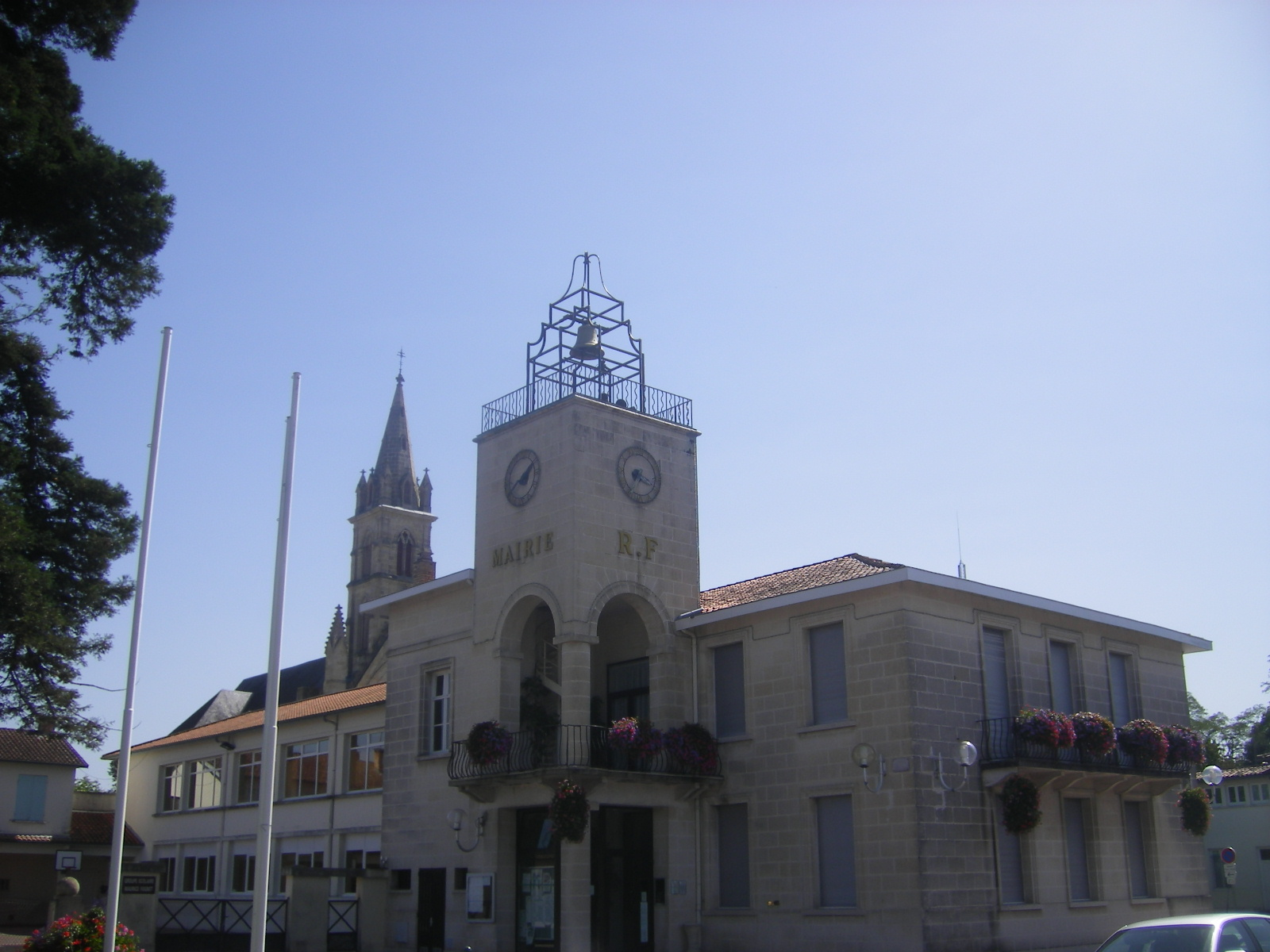
- Town hall

- Coat of arms
- Location of Marcheprime
- Location within France Location within Nouvelle-Aquitaine
- Coordinates: 44°41′36″N 0°51′13″W
- Country: France
- Region: Nouvelle-Aquitaine
- Department: Gironde
- Arrondissement: Arcachon
- Canton: Gujan-Mestras
- Intercommunality: CA Bassin d'Arcachon Nord

Government
  - Mayor (2020–2026): Manuel Martinez
- Area^{1}: 24.56 km^{2} (9.48 sq mi)
- Highest elevation: 62 m (203 ft)
- Lowest elevation: 34 m (112 ft)
- Population (2023): 5,696
  - Density: 231.9/km^{2} (600.7/sq mi)
- Time zone: UTC+01:00 (CET)
  - Summer (DST): UTC+02:00 (CEST)
- INSEE/Postal code: 33555 /33380
- ^{1} French Land Register data, which excludes lakes, ponds, glaciers > 1 km^{2} (0.386 sq mi or 247 acres) and river estuaries.

Marcheprime (French pronunciation: [maʁʃəpʁˈim]; Occitan: Marcha Prima) is a commune in the Gironde department in Nouvelle-Aquitaine in southwestern France. It was created in 1946 from part of the commune of Biganos.

== Population ==
Historical population
Year	Pop.	±% p.a.
1968	947	—
1975	1,256	+4.12%
1982	1,388	+1.44%
1990	2,420	+7.20%
1999	3,486	+4.14%
2007	3,801	+1.09%
2012	4,532	+3.58%
2017	4,724	+0.83%
2023	5,696	+3.17%
Source: INSEE

== See also ==
- Communes of the Gironde department
- Parc naturel régional des Landes de Gascogne
