= Canton of Andernos-les-Bains =

Coordinates: 44.74°N 1.10°W

- Canton
- Location of the canton of Andernos-les-Bains in the Gironde department.
- Country: France
- Region: Nouvelle-Aquitaine
- Department: Gironde
- No. of communes: {{{nbcomm}}}
- Established: 2015

Government
  - Representatives (2021–2028): Philippe de Gonneville; Marie Larrue
- Area: 457.44 km^{2} (176.62 sq mi)
- Population (2023): 55,465
  - Density: 121.25/km^{2} (314.04/sq mi)
- INSEE code: 33 01

The canton of Andernos-les-Bains is an administrative division of the Gironde department, southwestern France. It was created at the French canton reorganisation which came into effect in March 2015. Its seat is in Andernos-les-Bains.

It consists of the following communes:

1. Andernos-les-Bains
2. Arès
3. Audenge
4. Biganos
5. Lanton
6. Lège-Cap-Ferret

== Representation ==
List of successive departmental councilors for the canton of Andernos-les-Bains
Electoral period		In office		Name	Party	Capacity
2015	2021	2015	2021	Marie Larrue	DVD	Mayor of Lanton
2015	2021	2015	2021	Jean-Guy Perrière	DVD	Mayor of Arès (2001-2020)
2021	2028	2021	Incumbent	Philippe Le Harivel de Gonneville	DVD	Mayor of Lège-Cap-Ferret
2021	2028	2021	Incumbent	Marie Larrue	DVD	Mayor of Lanton
