= Mios =

- Commune
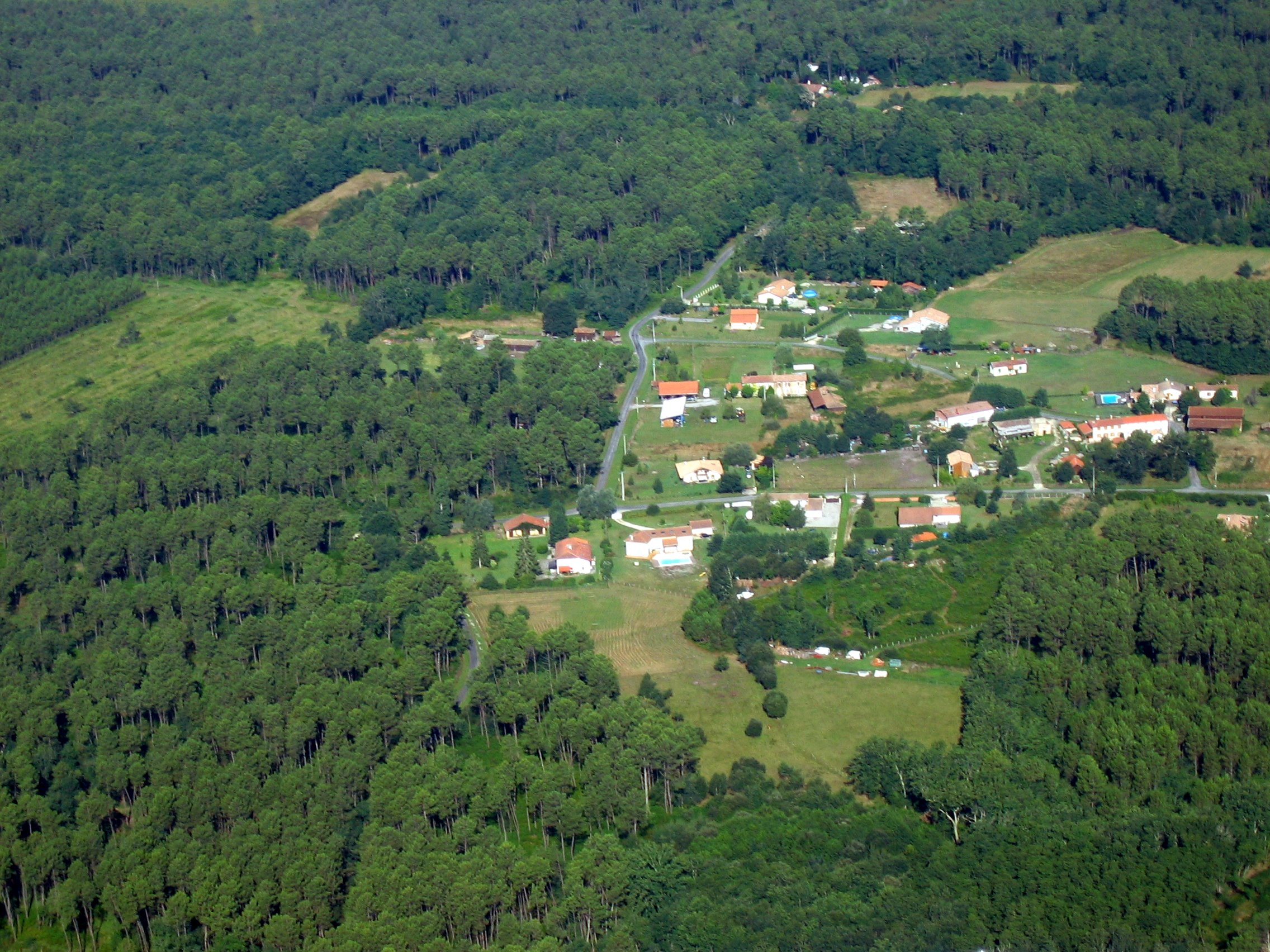
- An aerial view of Gassian

- Coat of arms
- Location of Mios
- Location within France Location within Nouvelle-Aquitaine
- Coordinates: 44°36′21″N 0°56′08″W
- Country: France
- Region: Nouvelle-Aquitaine
- Department: Gironde
- Arrondissement: Arcachon
- Canton: Gujan-Mestras
- Intercommunality: CA Bassin d'Arcachon Nord

Government
  - Mayor (2020–2026): Cédric Pain
- Area^{1}: 137.41 km^{2} (53.05 sq mi)
- Elevation: 7 m (23 ft)
- Highest elevation: 65 m (213 ft)
- Lowest elevation: 4 m (13 ft)
- Population (2023): 12,043
  - Density: 87.643/km^{2} (226.99/sq mi)
- Time zone: UTC+01:00 (CET)
  - Summer (DST): UTC+02:00 (CEST)
- INSEE/Postal code: 33284 /33380
- ^{1} French Land Register data, which excludes lakes, ponds, glaciers > 1 km^{2} (0.386 sq mi or 247 acres) and river estuaries.

Mios (French pronunciation: [mjɔs]; Gascon: Miòs) is a commune in the Gironde department in Nouvelle-Aquitaine in southwestern France.

== Population ==
Its inhabitants are called Miossais in French.

Historical population
Year	Pop.	±% p.a.
1968	2,457	—
1975	2,446	−0.06%
1982	2,977	+2.85%
1990	3,786	+3.05%
1999	4,620	+2.24%
2007	6,433	+4.22%
2012	7,871	+4.12%
2017	9,959	+4.82%
2023	12,043	+3.22%
Source: INSEE

== Sights ==
The Saint Brice chapel has a bell dating from 1700 classed as a monument historique by the French Ministry of Culture in 1942.

The Romanesque St Martin church, enlarged in the 19th century, has a Gothic choir and chapels, and remnants of 16th century stained glass.

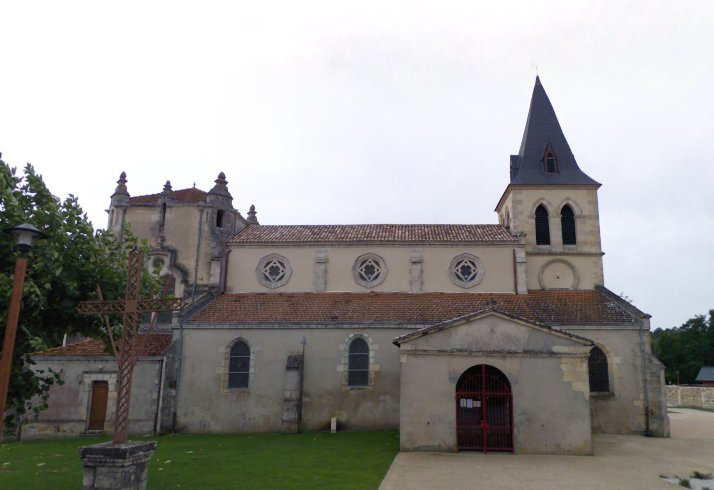
St Martin

== Twin towns – sister cities ==
- Val de San Vicente, Spain

== See also ==
- Communes of the Gironde department
- Parc naturel régional des Landes de Gascogne
