= Communauté d'agglomération du Bassin d'Arcachon Nord =

Bassin d'Arcachon Nord
- Communauté d'agglomération
- Interactive map of Bassin d'Arcachon Nord
- Coordinates: 44°44′N 00°59′W
- Country: France
- Region: Nouvelle-Aquitaine
- Department: Gironde
- No. of communes: {{{nbcomm}}}
- Established: 2003
- Area: 594.9 km^{2} (229.7 sq mi)
- Population (2019): 69,703
  - Density: 117.2/km^{2} (303.5/sq mi)
- Website: coban-atlantique.fr

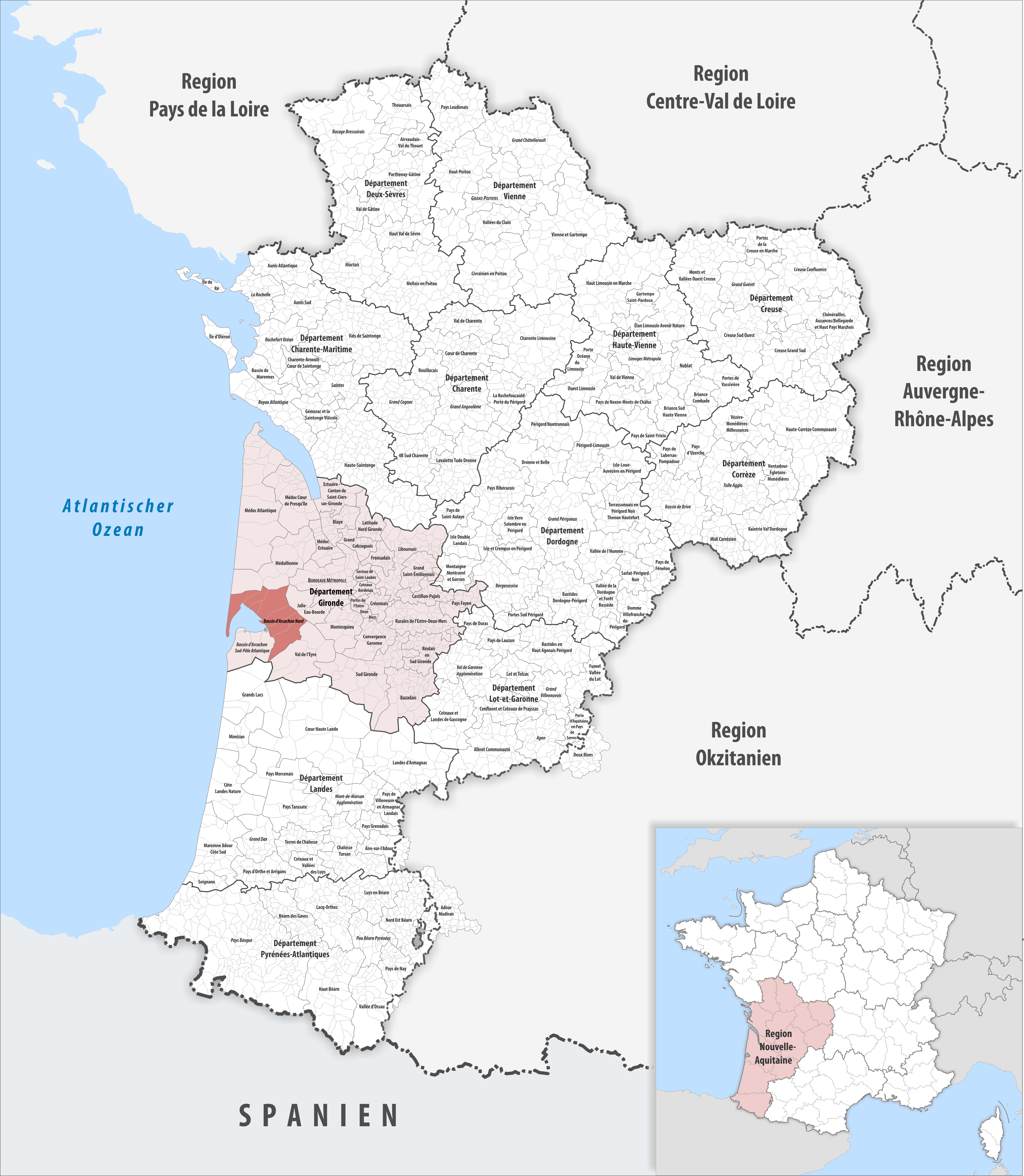
Communauté d'agglomération du Bassin d'Arcachon Nord

Communauté d'agglomération du Bassin d'Arcachon Nord is the communauté d'agglomération, an intercommunal structure, covering the area north of the Arcachon Bay. It is located in the Gironde department, in the Nouvelle-Aquitaine region, southwestern France. Created in 2003, its seat is in Andernos-les-Bains. Its area is 594.9 km^{2}. Its population was 69,703 in 2019.

== Composition ==
The communauté d'agglomération consists of the following 8 communes:

1. Andernos-les-Bains
2. Arès
3. Audenge
4. Biganos
5. Lanton
6. Lège-Cap-Ferret
7. Marcheprime
8. Mios
