= Grand Piquey =

Village in southwest France

Coordinates: 44°42′51″N 1°12′43″W

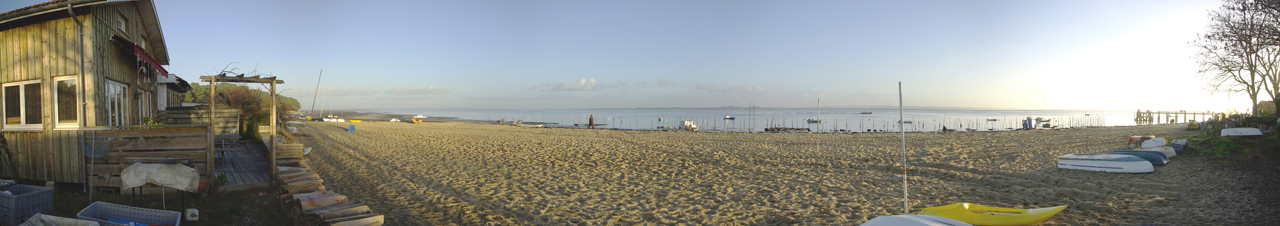
Panoramic view of Grand Piquey

Grand Piquey (French pronunciation: [ɡʁɑ̃ pikɛ]) is a village in the Gironde département, close to Bordeaux and on Arcachon Bay. It is part of the commune Lège-Cap-Ferret.

== Notable residents ==
- Jean Cocteau liked to stay in hotels in Grand Piquey with Raymond Radiguet.
