= Arrondissement of Arcachon =

Arcachon
- Arrondissement
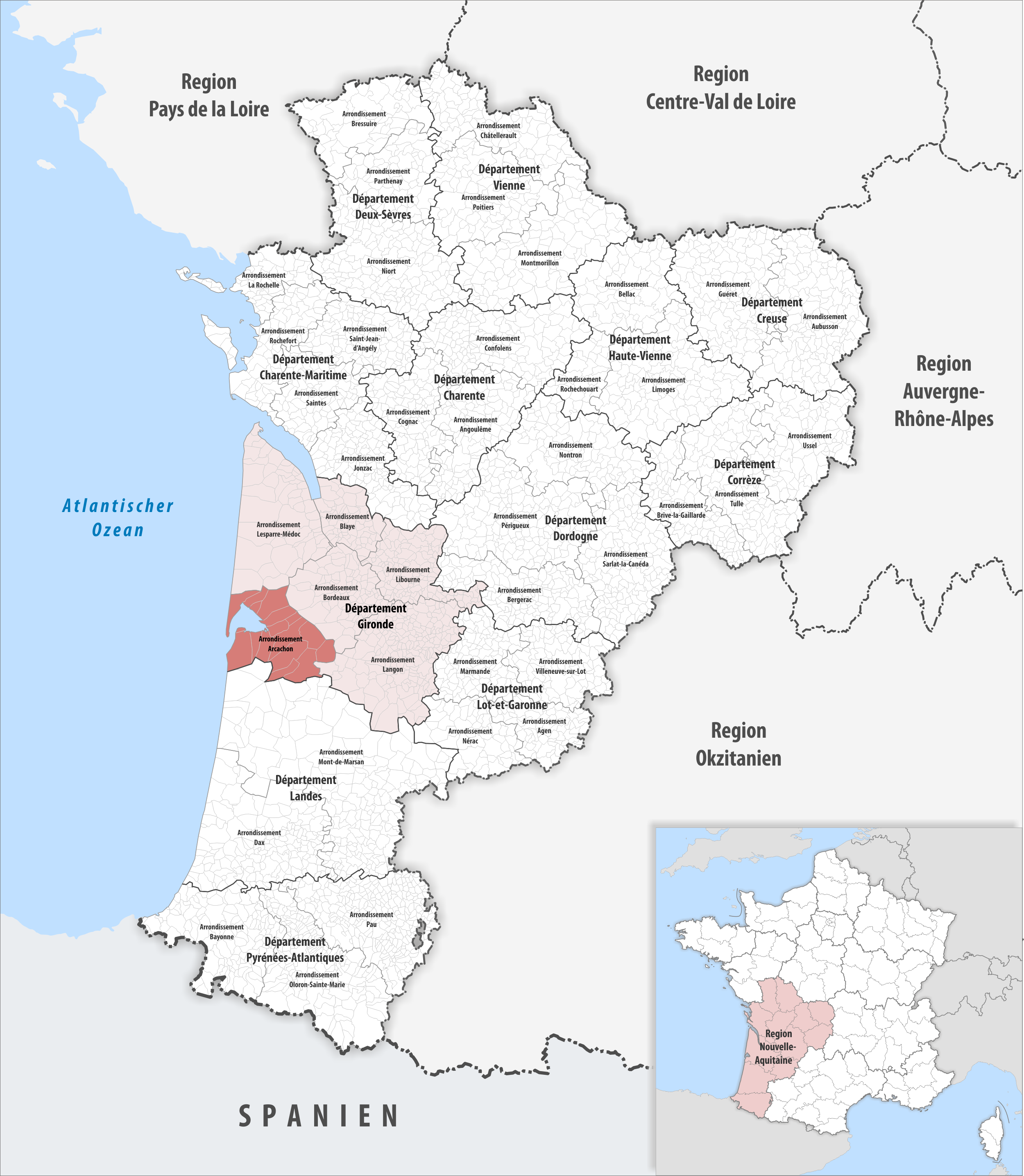
- Location within the region Nouvelle-Aquitaine
- Coordinates: 44°39′17″N 1°09′00″W
- Country: France
- Region: Nouvelle-Aquitaine
- Department: Gironde
- No. of communes: {{{nbcomm}}}
- Area: 1,469.8 km^{2} (567.5 sq mi)
- Population (2023): 165,952
  - Density: 112.91/km^{2} (292.43/sq mi)
- INSEE code: 336

The arrondissement of Arcachon is an arrondissement of France in the Gironde department in the Nouvelle-Aquitaine region. It has 17 communes. Its population is 162,720 (2021), and its area is 1,469.8 km^{2} (567.5 sq mi).

== Composition ==
The communes of the arrondissement of Arcachon, and their INSEE codes, are:

1. Andernos-les-Bains (33005)
2. Arcachon (33009)
3. Arès (33011)
4. Audenge (33019)
5. Le Barp (33029)
6. Belin-Béliet (33042)
7. Biganos (33051)
8. Gujan-Mestras (33199)
9. Lanton (33229)
10. Lège-Cap-Ferret (33236)
11. Lugos (33260)
12. Marcheprime (33555)
13. Mios (33284)
14. Saint-Magne (33436)
15. Salles (33498)
16. Le Teich (33527)
17. La Teste-de-Buch (33529)

== History ==
The arrondissement of Arcachon was created in January 2007 from the four cantons of Arcachon, Audenge, Belin-Béliet and La Teste-de-Buch, that were previously part of the arrondissement of Bordeaux.

As a result of the reorganisation of the cantons of France which came into effect in 2015, the borders of the cantons are no longer related to the borders of the arrondissements. The cantons of the arrondissement of Arcachon were, as of January 2015:

1. Arcachon
2. Audenge
3. Belin-Béliet
4. La Teste-de-Buch
