= Cap Ferret =

Headland in Gironde, France

- Cape
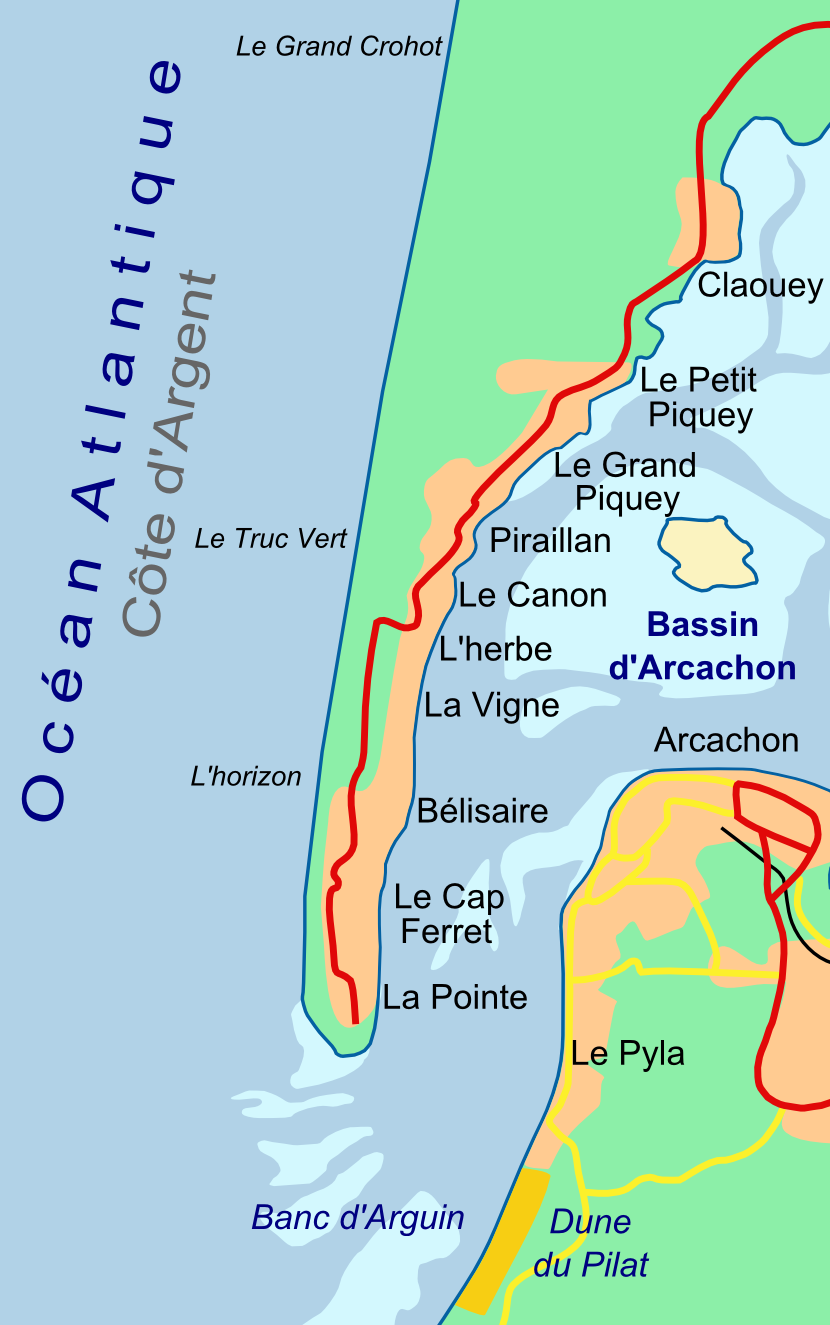
- Coordinates: 44°38′46.28″N 1°14′56.11″W
- Location: Nouvelle-Aquitaine, France
- Water bodies: Atlantic Ocean, Arcachon Bay

Cap Ferret (French pronunciation: [kap fɛʁɛ]; English: Cape Ferret) is a headland situated at the south end of the commune of Lège-Cap-Ferret in the Gironde department in the French southwestern Nouvelle-Aquitaine region. The headland takes the form of a spit, which separates the Atlantic Ocean from Arcachon Bay. At the same time, the entrance to Arcachon Bay separates Cap Ferret from the resort town of Arcachon.

Cap Ferret is notable for its lighthouse and as an up-market resort that has retained its natural feel at the heart of the Landes of Gascony and the Pays de Buch. It is also famous for its ostréicole (oyster farming) activity and numerous tasting sites.

Cap Ferret is accessible by road from the north, and by passenger ferry from Arcachon. The Tramway du Cap-Ferret, a diesel operated narrow-gauge railway, links the ferry landing at Bélisaire on the shores of Arcachon Bay with the beaches on the Atlantic coast.

In July 2026, authorities ordered a complete evacuation of around 40,000 people from the Cap Ferret peninsula due to wildfires which had started to the north in Saumos and had consumed 8,700 hectares (c. 21,500 acres).

== Gallery ==
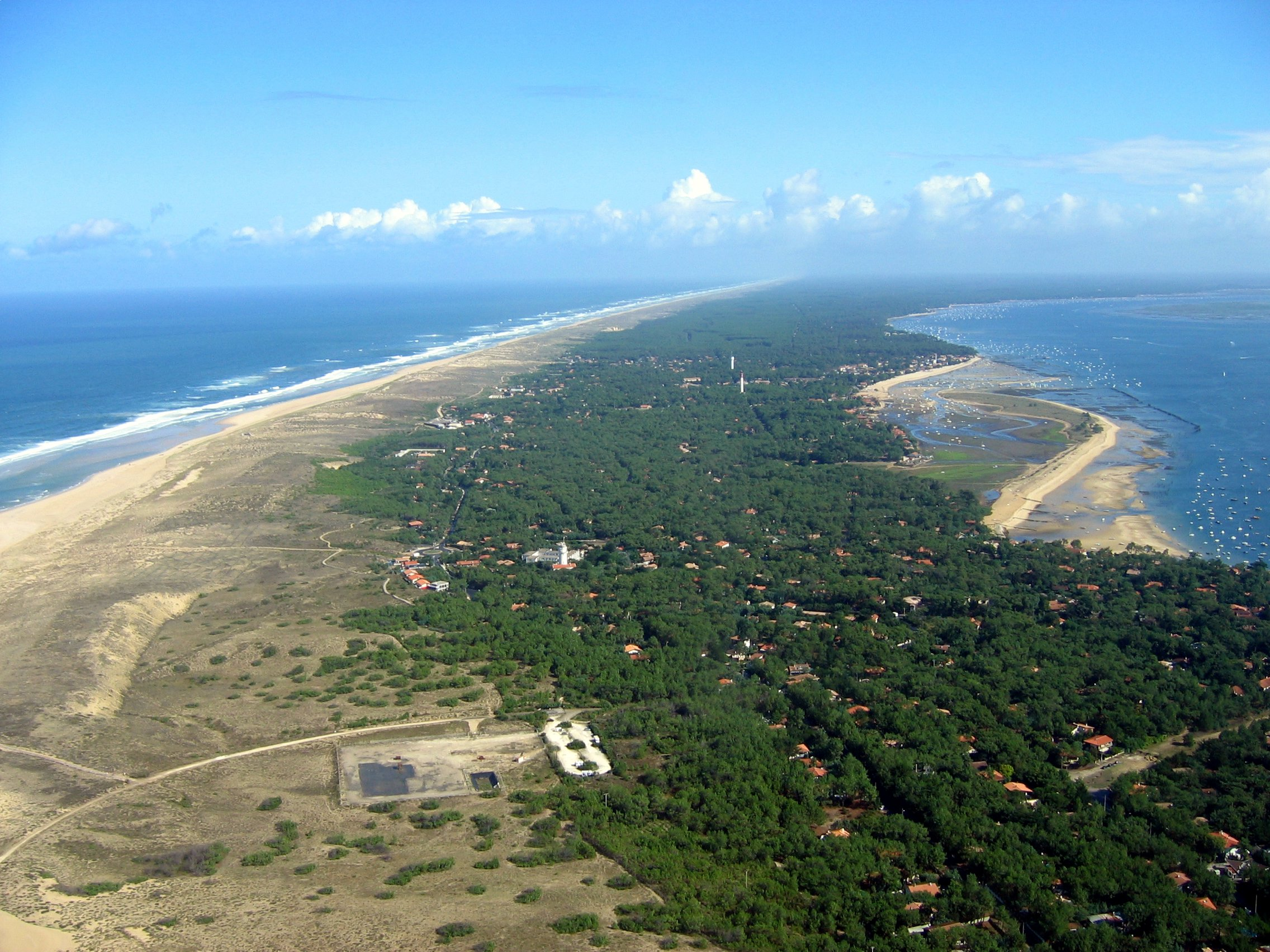
Cap Ferret looking north

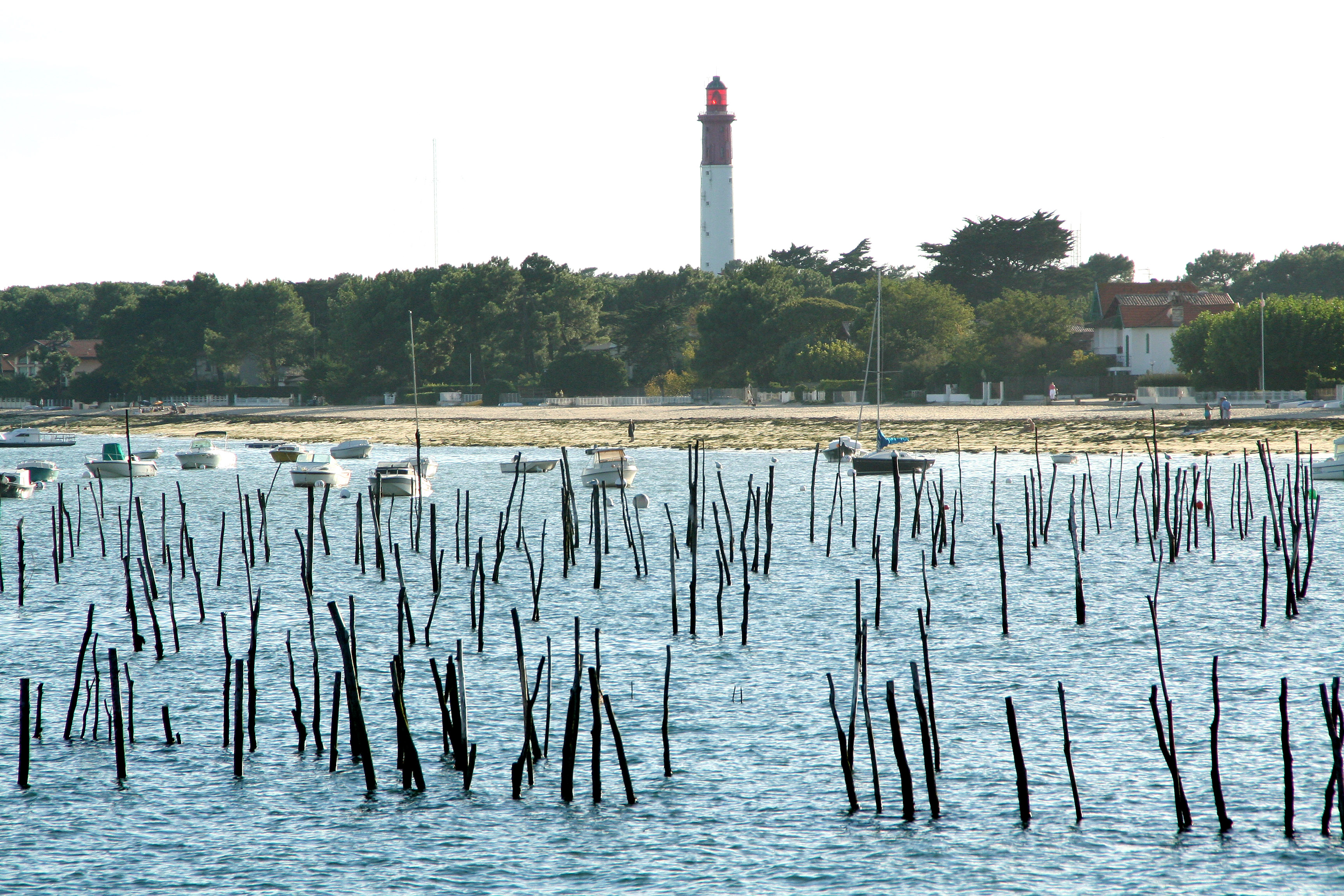
The lighthouse at Cap Ferret

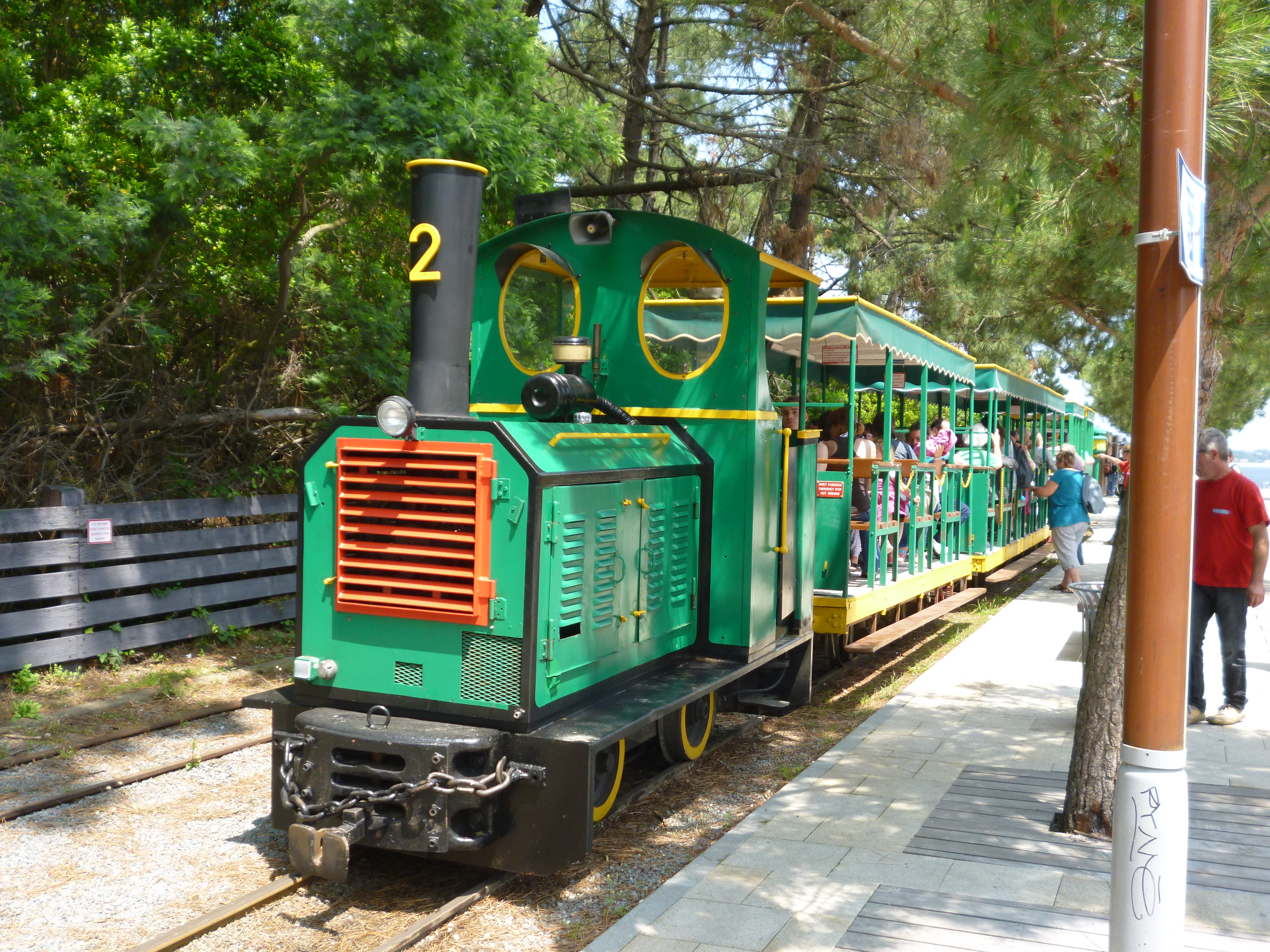
The Tramway du Cap-Ferret

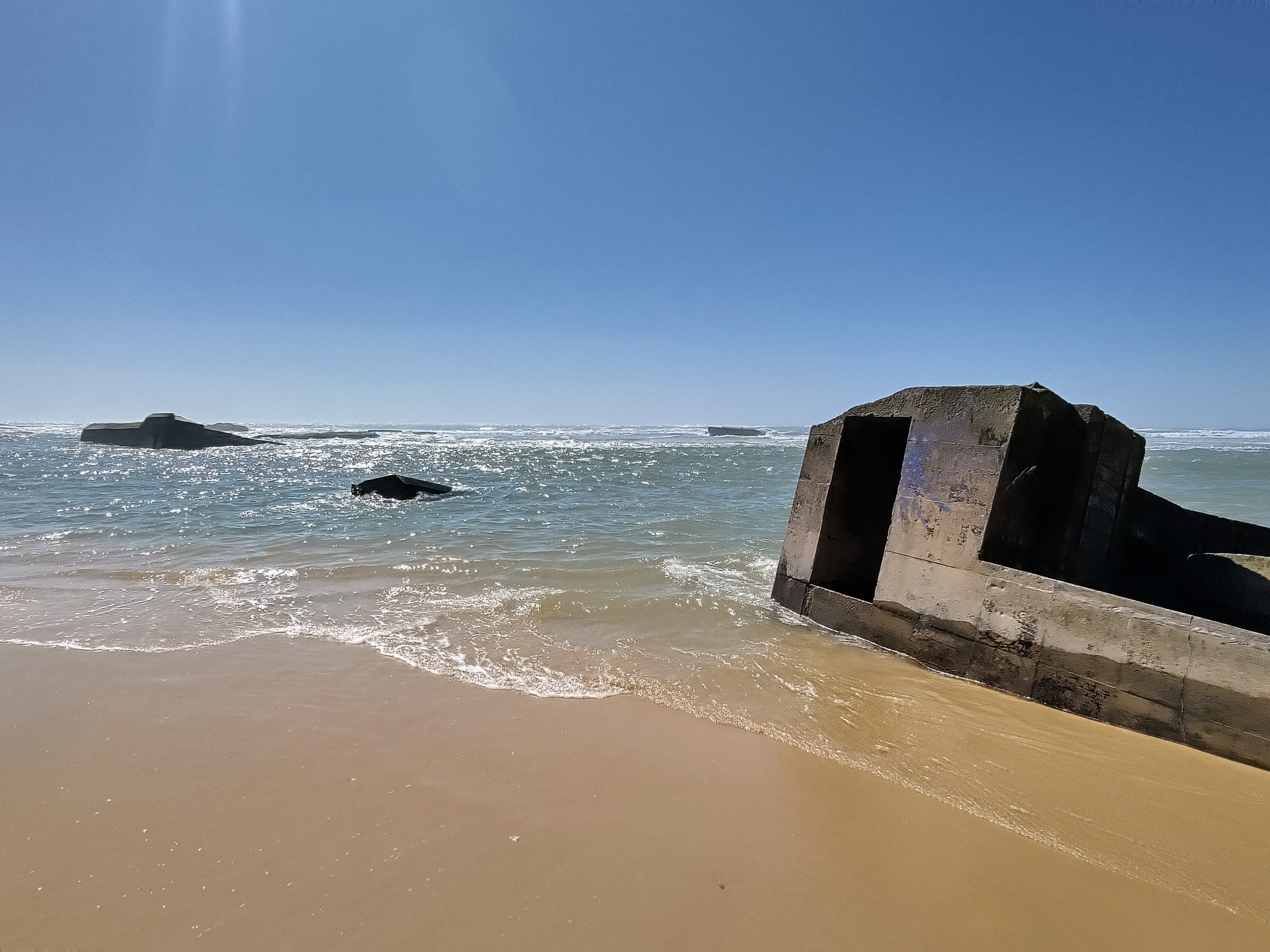
Ruins of Nazi bunkers in the sea at Cap Ferret
