= Lugos =

- Commune
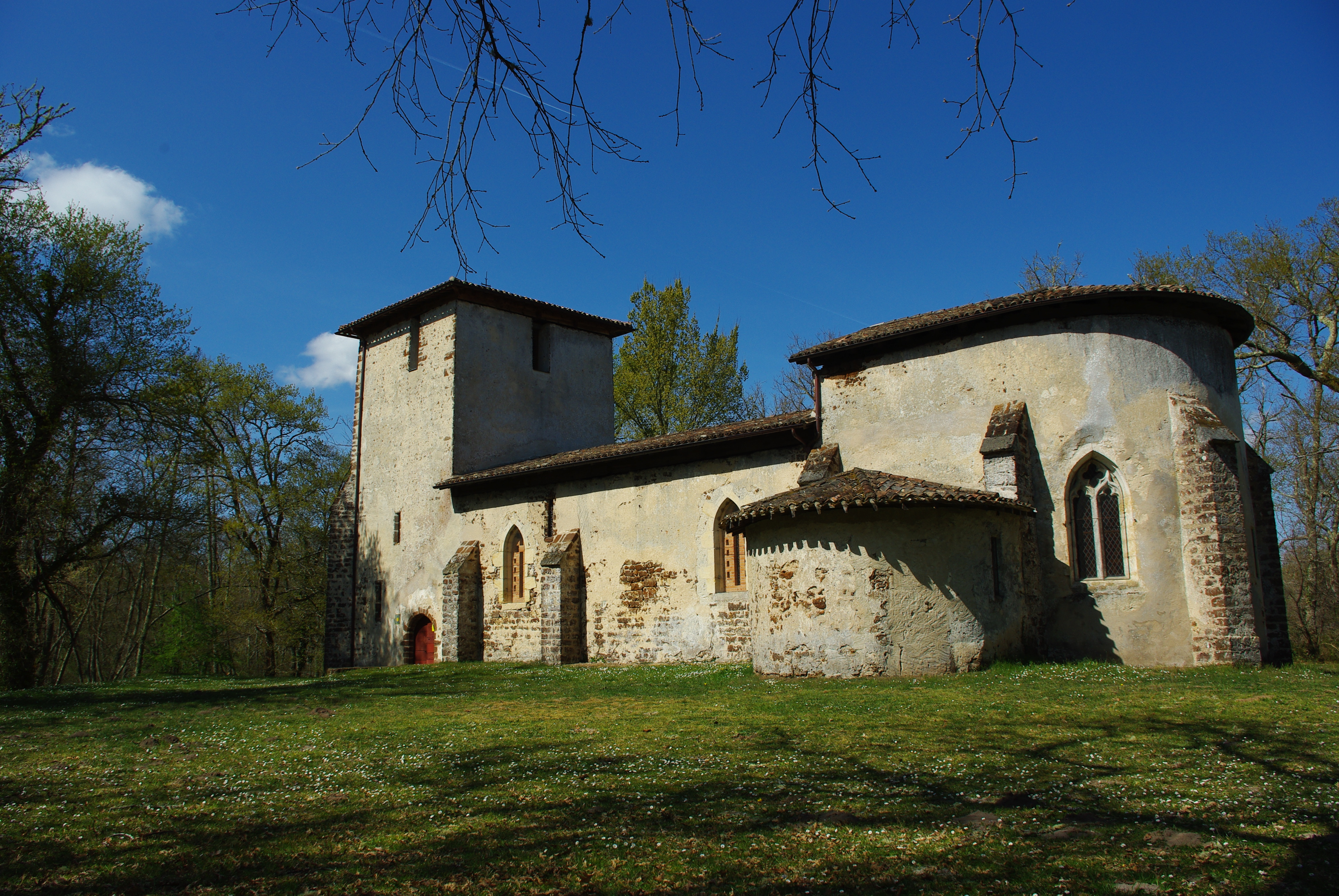
- The church in Lugos

- Coat of arms
- Location of Lugos
- Location within France Location within Nouvelle-Aquitaine
- Coordinates: 44°29′02″N 0°53′01″W
- Country: France
- Region: Nouvelle-Aquitaine
- Department: Gironde
- Arrondissement: Arcachon
- Canton: Les Landes des Graves
- Intercommunality: Val de l'Eyre

Government
  - Mayor (2020–2026): Emmanuelle Tostain
- Area^{1}: 62.14 km^{2} (23.99 sq mi)
- Elevation: 24 m (79 ft)
- Highest elevation: 49 m (161 ft)
- Lowest elevation: 11 m (36 ft)
- Population (2023): 1,208
  - Density: 19.44/km^{2} (50.35/sq mi)
- Time zone: UTC+01:00 (CET)
  - Summer (DST): UTC+02:00 (CEST)
- INSEE/Postal code: 33260 /33830
- ^{1} French Land Register data, which excludes lakes, ponds, glaciers > 1 km^{2} (0.386 sq mi or 247 acres) and river estuaries.

Lugos (French pronunciation: [lyɡɔs]; Occitan: Lugòs) is a commune in the Gironde department in Nouvelle-Aquitaine in southwestern France.

== Population ==
Historical population
Year	Pop.	±% p.a.
1968	390	—
1975	391	+0.04%
1982	415	+0.85%
1990	476	+1.73%
1999	558	+1.78%
2007	788	+4.41%
2012	858	+1.72%
2017	927	+1.56%
2023	1,208	+4.51%
Source: INSEE

== See also ==
- Communes of the Gironde department
- Parc naturel régional des Landes de Gascogne
