= Andernos-les-Bains =

- Commune
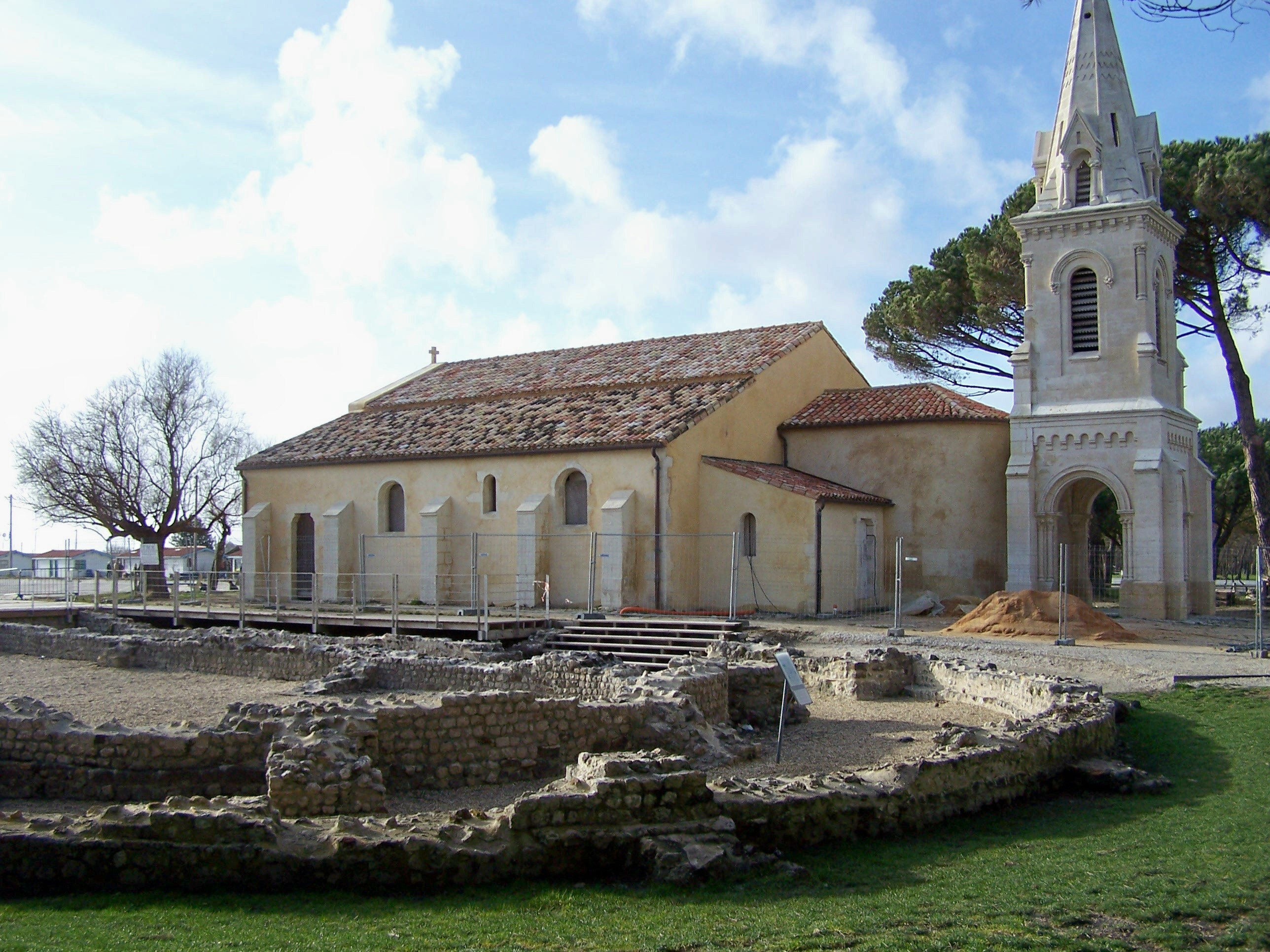
- The church in Andernos-les-Bains

- Coat of arms
- Location of Andernos-les-Bains
- Location within France Location within Nouvelle-Aquitaine
- Coordinates: 44°44′36″N 1°05′21″W
- Country: France
- Region: Nouvelle-Aquitaine
- Department: Gironde
- Arrondissement: Arcachon
- Canton: Andernos-les-Bains
- Intercommunality: CA Bassin d'Arcachon Nord

Government
  - Mayor (2020–2026): Jean-Yves Rosazza
- Area^{1}: 20.01 km^{2} (7.73 sq mi)
- Elevation: 4 m (13 ft)
- Highest elevation: 30 m (98 ft)
- Lowest elevation: 1 m (3.3 ft)
- Population (2023): 12,710
  - Density: 635.2/km^{2} (1,645/sq mi)
- Demonym: Andernosiens
- Time zone: UTC+01:00 (CET)
  - Summer (DST): UTC+02:00 (CEST)
- INSEE/Postal code: 33005 /33510
- Website: www.andernoslesbains.fr
- ^{1} French Land Register data, which excludes lakes, ponds, glaciers > 1 km^{2} (0.386 sq mi or 247 acres) and river estuaries.

Andernos-les-Bains (French pronunciation: [ɑ̃dɛʁnɔs le bɛ̃]; lit. 'Andernos-the-Baths'; Occitan: Endarnòs) is a commune in the Gironde department, southwestern France. Andernos-les-Bains is located on the northeast shore of Arcachon Bay. To its northwest is the town of Arès.

Andernos-les-Bains consists of four other small communities: Taussat, Cassy, Lanton and Audenge. All these villages have oyster farms and small fisheries. For many years, the oyster and fishing industry provided the main income to the area. More recently, tourism has become a strong economic factor in the area.

The bay's Portuguese oysters died out during 1970–1972 because of gill disease. In 1974, another oyster, the Pacific oyster, developed a disease caused by the paint used on fishing boats. An oil tanker spill in 1978 further damaged the oyster industry, which continued to suffer around the bay until 1981. Since 2000, the oyster industry has been recovering and now nearly 15,000 metric tons are produced per year.

Andernos-les-Bains has a 5.4 kilometres (3.4 miles) long sand beach.

== Population ==
Historical population
Year	Pop.	±% p.a.
1968	4,676	—
1975	5,119	+1.30%
1982	5,971	+2.22%
1990	7,176	+2.32%
1999	9,254	+2.87%
2007	10,543	+1.64%
2012	11,376	+1.53%
2017	11,645	+0.47%
2023	12,710	+1.47%
Source: INSEE

== Transport ==
The closest airport is Bordeaux-Mérignac, 30 kilometres (19 miles) away.

== Sights ==
- The Great Dune of Pyla – the longest in Europe
- Island of Birds
- Cape Ferret light house at the tip of the Arcachon Bay
- The prehistoric remains of the Betey

== Twin towns – sister cities ==
Andernos-les-Bains is twinned with:

- Largs, Scotland, United Kingdom
- Nußloch, Germany
- Segorbe, Spain

== See also ==
- Communes of the Gironde department
