= Lège-Cap-Ferret =

- Commune
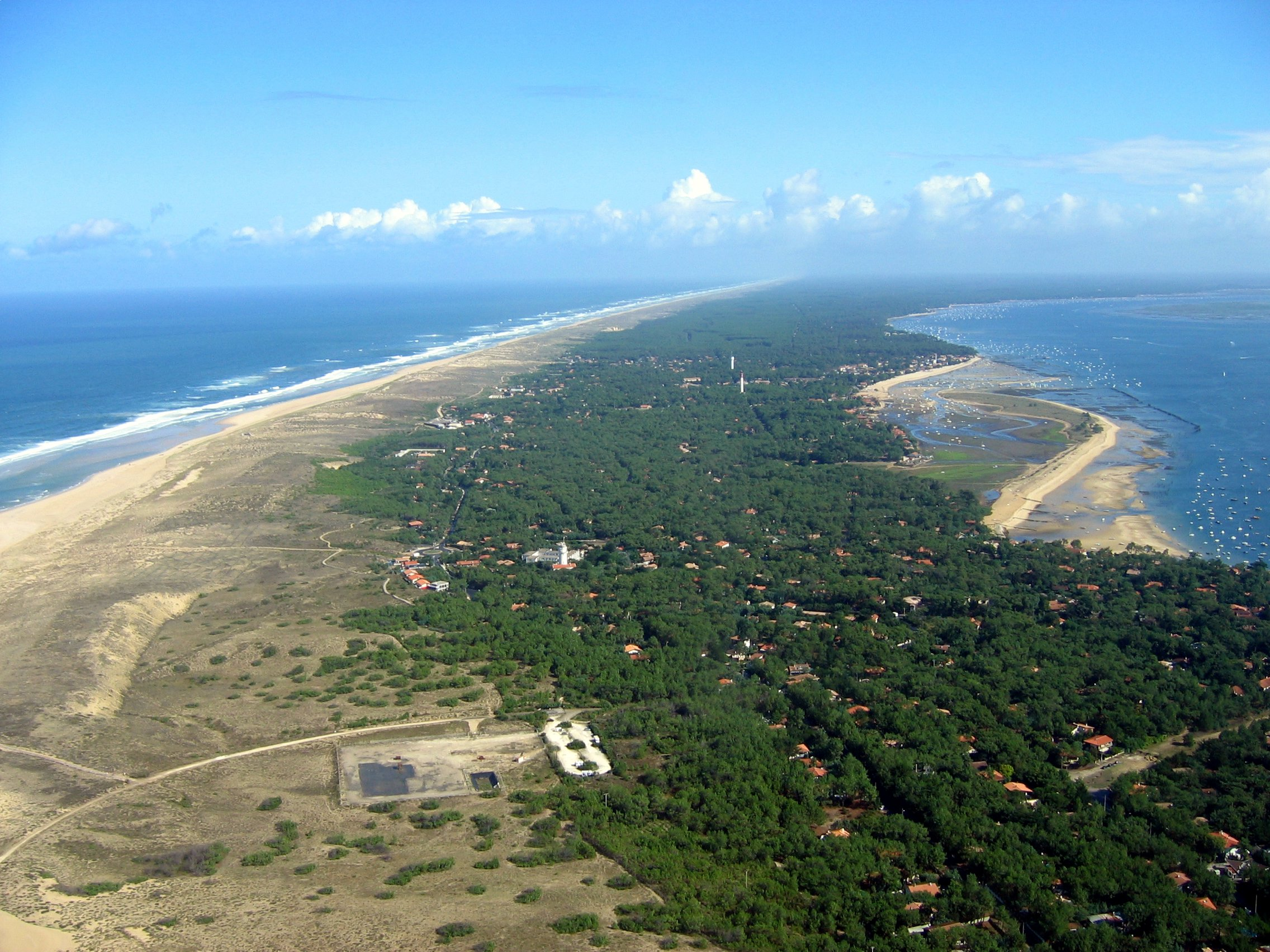
- An aerial view of Cap-Ferret

- Coat of arms
- Location of Lège-Cap-Ferret
- Location within France Location within Nouvelle-Aquitaine
- Coordinates: 44°47′38″N 1°08′43″W
- Country: France
- Region: Nouvelle-Aquitaine
- Department: Gironde
- Arrondissement: Arcachon
- Canton: Andernos-les-Bains
- Intercommunality: CA Bassin d'Arcachon Nord

Government
  - Mayor (2020–2026): Philippe De Gonneville
- Area^{1}: 93.62 km^{2} (36.15 sq mi)
- Elevation: 11 m (36 ft)
- Highest elevation: 43 m (141 ft)
- Lowest elevation: 0 m (0 ft)
- Population (2023): 7,909
  - Density: 84.48/km^{2} (218.8/sq mi)
- Time zone: UTC+01:00 (CET)
  - Summer (DST): UTC+02:00 (CEST)
- INSEE/Postal code: 33236 /33950
- ^{1} French Land Register data, which excludes lakes, ponds, glaciers > 1 km^{2} (0.386 sq mi or 247 acres) and river estuaries.

Lège-Cap-Ferret (French pronunciation: [lɛʒ kap fɛʁɛ]; Gascon: Lèja e lo Horet) is a commune in the Gironde department in Nouvelle-Aquitaine in southwestern France. The commune stretches along the length of the Cap Ferret peninsula, from the village of Lège in the north to the point of Cap Ferret in the south.

== Population ==
Historical population
Year	Pop.	±% p.a.
1968	4,232	—
1975	4,318	+0.29%
1982	4,981	+2.06%
1990	5,564	+1.39%
1999	6,307	+1.40%
2007	7,321	+1.88%
2012	8,099	+2.04%
2017	8,409	+0.75%
2023	7,909	−1.02%
Source: INSEE

== Climate ==
Climate data for Lège-Cap-Ferret (1961–1990)
Month	Jan	Feb	Mar	Apr	May	Jun	Jul	Aug	Sep	Oct	Nov	Dec	Year
Mean daily maximum °C (°F)	10.2 (50.4)	11.6 (52.9)	13.5 (56.3)	15.9 (60.6)	19.1 (66.4)	22.0 (71.6)	24.7 (76.5)	24.5 (76.1)	22.9 (73.2)	19.1 (66.4)	13.9 (57.0)	10.8 (51.4)	17.4 (63.3)
Daily mean °C (°F)	7.3 (45.1)	8.3 (46.9)	9.8 (49.6)	12.1 (53.8)	15.1 (59.2)	18.1 (64.6)	20.5 (68.9)	20.5 (68.9)	18.7 (65.7)	15.4 (59.7)	10.6 (51.1)	7.9 (46.2)	13.7 (56.7)
Mean daily minimum °C (°F)	4.4 (39.9)	5.1 (41.2)	6.1 (43.0)	8.2 (46.8)	11.2 (52.2)	14.1 (57.4)	16.3 (61.3)	16.4 (61.5)	14.5 (58.1)	11.6 (52.9)	7.4 (45.3)	5.0 (41.0)	10.0 (50.0)
Average precipitation mm (inches)	88.2 (3.47)	75.1 (2.96)	66.4 (2.61)	64.7 (2.55)	66.8 (2.63)	47.1 (1.85)	38.1 (1.50)	53.0 (2.09)	74.4 (2.93)	83.2 (3.28)	93.1 (3.67)	95.5 (3.76)	845.6 (33.29)
Average relative humidity (%)	88	85	81	80	79	80	78	79	80	84	87	88	82.4
Mean monthly sunshine hours	90.8	113.2	171.4	201.0	233.7	258.4	287.2	260.0	212.5	170.6	109.6	88.1	2,196.5
Source: Infoclimat.fr

== International relations ==
The commune is twinned with:

- Sandhausen, Germany, since 1980
- Úbeda, Spain, since 1983

== See also ==
- Cap Ferret
- Grand Piquey
- Communes of the Gironde department
