= Audenge =

- Commune
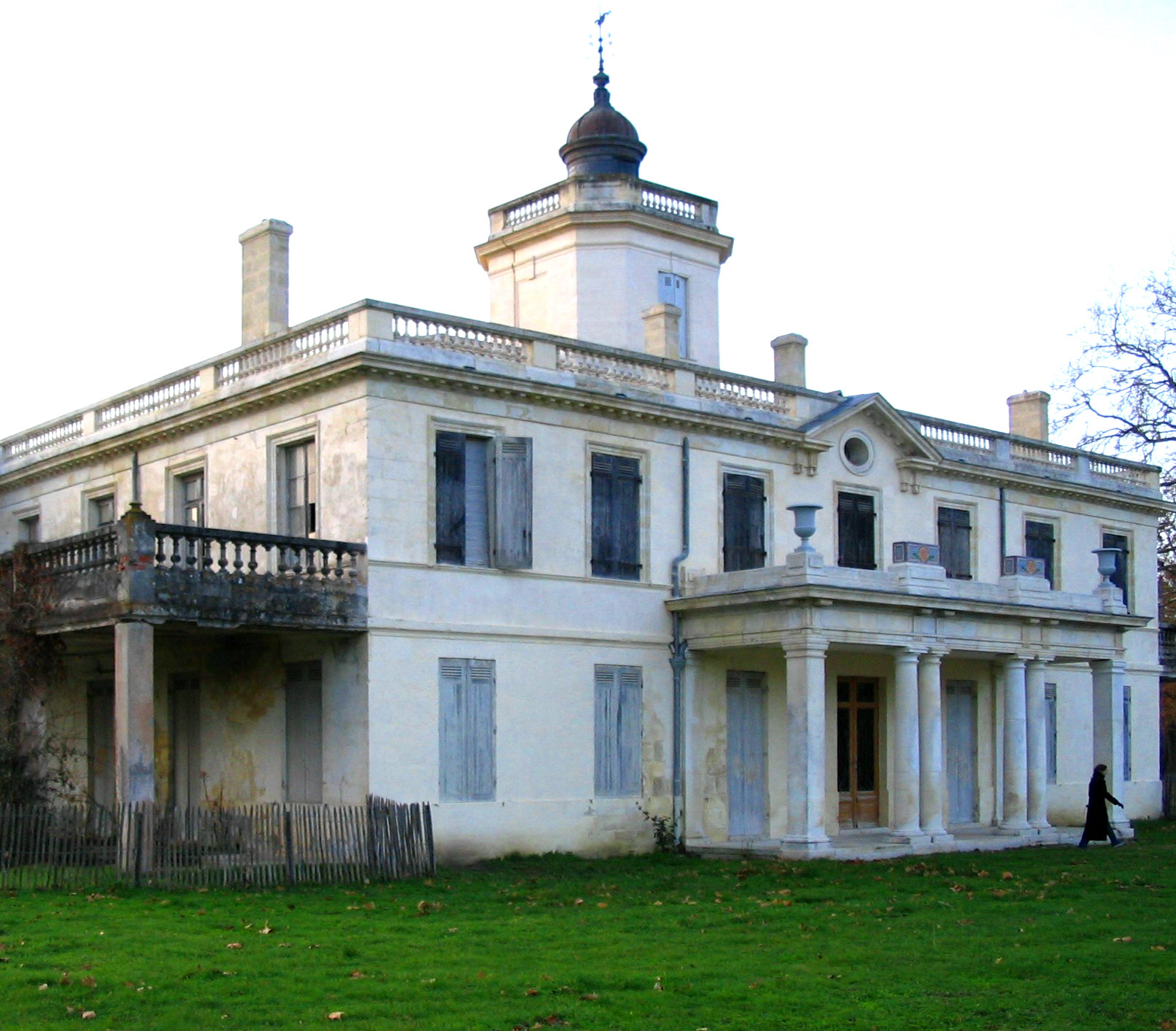
- Chateau of Certes

- Coat of arms
- Location of Audenge
- Location within France Location within Nouvelle-Aquitaine
- Coordinates: 44°41′05″N 1°00′43″W
- Country: France
- Region: Nouvelle-Aquitaine
- Department: Gironde
- Arrondissement: Arcachon
- Canton: Andernos-les-Bains
- Intercommunality: CA Bassin d'Arcachon Nord

Government
  - Mayor (2020–2026): Nathalie Le Yondre
- Area^{1}: 82.09 km^{2} (31.70 sq mi)
- Elevation: 7 m (23 ft)
- Highest elevation: 59 m (194 ft)
- Lowest elevation: 0 m (0 ft)
- Population (2023): 9,596
  - Density: 116.9/km^{2} (302.8/sq mi)
- Time zone: UTC+01:00 (CET)
  - Summer (DST): UTC+02:00 (CEST)
- INSEE/Postal code: 33019 /33980
- ^{1} French Land Register data, which excludes lakes, ponds, glaciers > 1 km^{2} (0.386 sq mi or 247 acres) and river estuaries.

Audenge (French pronunciation: [odɑ̃ʒ]; Occitan: Audenja) is a commune in the Gironde department in southwestern France.

== Geography ==
The town is situated on the Arcachon Bay (Bassin d'Arcachon), between Lanton, Biganos and Marcheprime.

== Population ==
Inhabitants of Audenge are called Audengeois in French.

Historical population
Year	Pop.	±% p.a.
1968	2,234	—
1975	2,529	+1.79%
1982	2,675	+0.81%
1990	2,981	+1.36%
1999	3,948	+3.17%
2007	5,660	+4.61%
2012	6,622	+3.19%
2017	7,993	+3.84%
2023	9,596	+3.09%
Source: INSEE

== History ==
Audenge's patron saint is Saint Yves, patron of fishermen.

== See also ==
- Communes of the Gironde department
- Parc naturel régional des Landes de Gascogne
