= Biganos =

- Commune
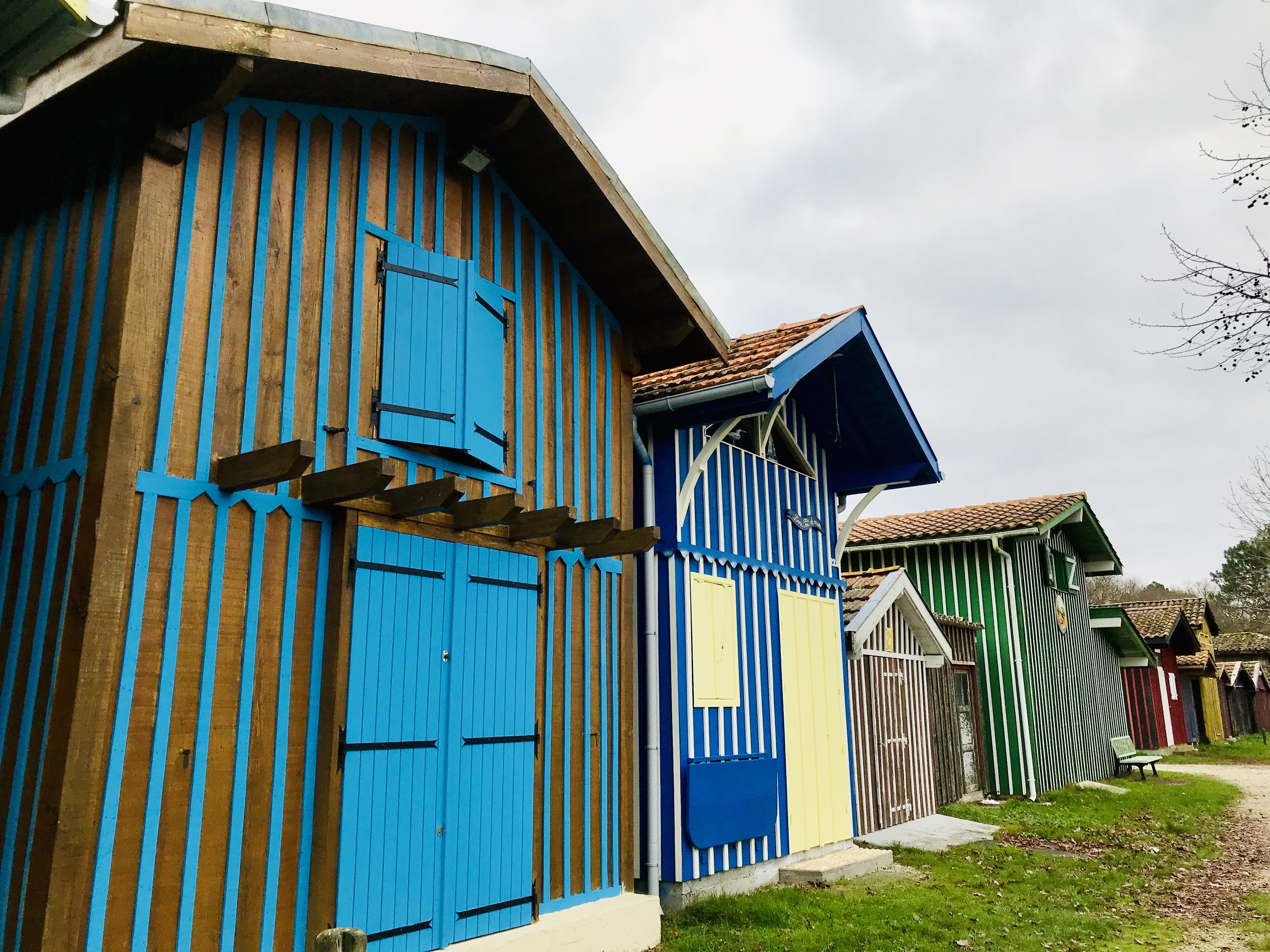
- Port

- Coat of arms
- Location of Biganos
- Location within France Location within Nouvelle-Aquitaine
- Coordinates: 44°38′42″N 0°58′38″W
- Country: France
- Region: Nouvelle-Aquitaine
- Department: Gironde
- Arrondissement: Arcachon
- Canton: Andernos-les-Bains
- Intercommunality: CA Bassin d'Arcachon Nord

Government
  - Mayor (2020–2026): Bruno Lafon
- Area^{1}: 77.28 km^{2} (29.84 sq mi)
- Elevation: 13 m (43 ft)
- Highest elevation: 45 m (148 ft)
- Lowest elevation: 0 m (0 ft)
- Population (2023): 11,431
  - Density: 147.9/km^{2} (383.1/sq mi)
- Time zone: UTC+01:00 (CET)
  - Summer (DST): UTC+02:00 (CEST)
- INSEE/Postal code: 33051 /33380
- ^{1} French Land Register data, which excludes lakes, ponds, glaciers > 1 km^{2} (0.386 sq mi or 247 acres) and river estuaries.

Biganos (French pronunciation: [biɡanɔs]; Occitan: Viganòs) is a commune in the Gironde department in Nouvelle-Aquitaine in southwestern France.

This commune has two marinas on the river Eyre, close to its outflow into the Arcachon Bay.

== Population ==
Historical population
Year	Pop.	±% p.a.
1968	4,213	—
1975	4,416	+0.67%
1982	4,588	+0.55%
1990	5,908	+3.21%
1999	6,950	+1.82%
2007	8,861	+3.08%
2012	9,855	+2.15%
2017	10,706	+1.67%
2023	11,431	+1.10%
Source: INSEE

== Twin towns – sister cities ==
- Saint-Martin-de-Fontenay France, since 1991

== See also ==
- Communes of the Gironde department
- Parc naturel régional des Landes de Gascogne
