= Arès =

- Commune
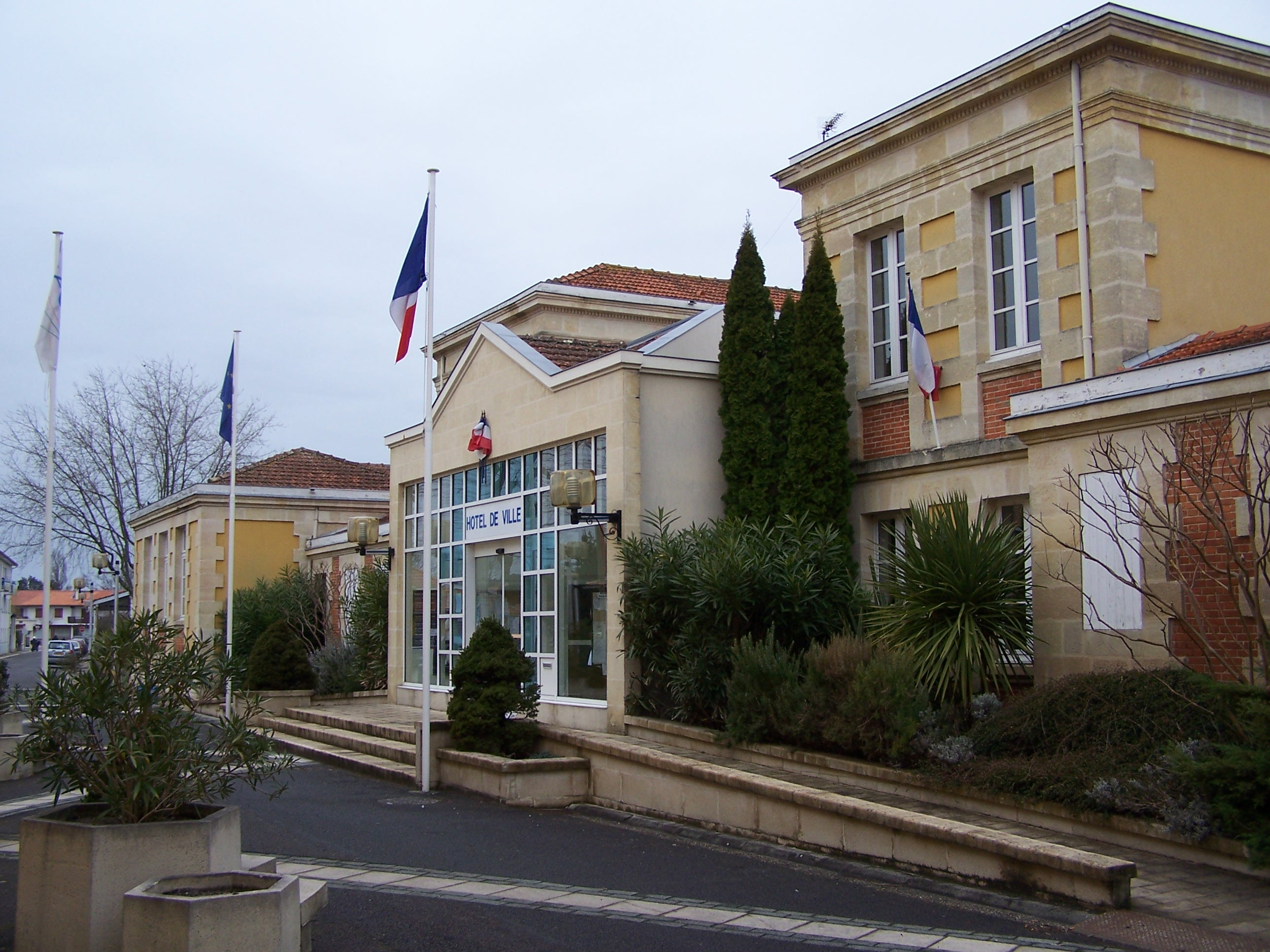
- Arès Town hall

- Coat of arms
- Location of Arès
- Location within France Location within Nouvelle-Aquitaine
- Coordinates: 44°45′57″N 1°08′07″W
- Country: France
- Region: Nouvelle-Aquitaine
- Department: Gironde
- Arrondissement: Arcachon
- Canton: Andernos-les-Bains
- Intercommunality: CA Bassin d'Arcachon Nord

Government
  - Mayor (2020–2026): Xavier Daney
- Area^{1}: 48.25 km^{2} (18.63 sq mi)
- Elevation: 7 m (23 ft)
- Highest elevation: 37 m (121 ft)
- Lowest elevation: 0 m (0 ft)
- Population (2023): 6,482
  - Density: 134.3/km^{2} (347.9/sq mi)
- Demonym(s): Arésien, Arésienne (French)
- Time zone: UTC+01:00 (CET)
  - Summer (DST): UTC+02:00 (CEST)
- INSEE/Postal code: 33011 /33740
- ^{1} French Land Register data, which excludes lakes, ponds, glaciers > 1 km^{2} (0.386 sq mi or 247 acres) and river estuaries.

Arès (French pronunciation: [aʁɛs]; Occitan: Arés, pronounced [aˈɾes]) is a commune in the department of Gironde, in the region of Nouvelle-Aquitaine, southwestern France.

== Population ==
Historical population
Year	Pop.	±% p.a.
1968	2,741	—
1975	2,656	−0.45%
1982	3,051	+2.00%
1990	3,911	+3.15%
1999	4,680	+2.01%
2007	5,472	+1.97%
2012	5,674	+0.73%
2017	6,308	+2.14%
2023	6,482	+0.45%
Source: INSEE

== See also ==
- Communes of the Gironde department
- Pilgrims of Arès
