= Henri Enjalbert =

French professor of geography

Henri Enjalbert (20 January 1910 – 19 June 1983) was a French professor of geography at the University of Bordeaux. He was considered an eminent specialist in wine geology, whose expert opinion frequently overlapped into the fields of oenology, and wine and terroir history, within the Bordeaux region and beyond. Among other credits, he has been called "Bordeaux's most diligent geologist" and "the discoverer of Mas de Daumas Gassac. Among his contentions are that Albania, the Ionian Islands of Greece, and southern Dalmatia in present-day Bosnia and Herzegovina may have been the last European refuge of the grape vine after the Ice Age.

== Publications ==
Enjalbert's publications range from studies on Château Latour, Château Haut-Brion and Saint-Émilion, to book titles such as Les Grands Vins de St-Emilion, Pomerol et Fronsac (English translation: Great Bordeaux Wines), L'Origine de la Qualité and L'histoire de la vigne & du vin (English: The History of Wine and the Vine) with his son Bernard. The latter book launched a revised perspective on the Bordeaux Wine Official Classification of 1855, and for which he posthumously received the Prix littéraire de l'Académie du Vin de Bordeaux in 1984.

== History of Pomerol ==
While a professor of geography at the University of Bordeaux, Enjalbert completed his work Les Grands Vins de St-Emilion, Pomerol et Fronsac which included an extensive historical account of the Pomerol wine region derived from the memoirs of estate owners as well as official reports and the documentations from notaries. On item that was noted was the early presence of Cabernet franc and Malbec in Pomerol in the mid 18th century at Château Trochau (now Château Haut Tropchaud) when the grapes were known under the synonyms Bouchet and Noir de Pressac as well as a Cabernet vine that may be an early mention of Cabernet Sauvignon in Bordeaux on the Right Bank long before it would establish itself in the Left Bank estates of the Médoc and Graves. Enjalbert also discovered that white wine grapes were prevalent throughout the Pomerol region in the mid-18th century but were just then started to be pulled out in favor of red grape varieties. His work also included the early history of the Pomerol estates Château Pétrus, Château Trotanoy, Château La Conseillante, Château Nenin, Vieux Château Certan, Château Gazin and Château Beauregard.
