= Moueix =

Moueix is a surname that may refer to the following:

- Christian Moueix, French winemaker and son of Jean-Pierre Moueix
- Edouard Moueix, grandson of Jean-Pierre Moueix, manager of Château Bélair-Monange
- Jean-François Moueix, son of Jean-Pierre Moueix and administrator of Château Pétrus
- Jean-Pierre Moueix, French winemaker
