= Château Certan =

Château Certan was an estate in the Bordeaux region of France that was divided into three neighbouring wineries:

- Vieux Château Certan
- Château Certan de May
- Château Certan-Giraud, presently Château Hosanna and Château Certan Marzelle
