= Château Hosanna =

Château Hosanna, formerly Château Certan-Giraud, is a Bordeaux wine from the appellation Pomerol. The winery is located on the Right Bank of the Bordeaux wine region, in the commune of Pomerol in the department Gironde. As all wine produced in this appellation, Château Hosanna is unclassified, but Certan-Giraud has historically been estimated among the great crus of the region.

== History ==
The property is situated south of Château Lafleur, west of Château Pétrus and north of Vieux Château Certan. Sharing its origin with Vieux Château Certan and Château Certan-de-May, the estate was once part of the original Certan property, belonging to the de May family before the French Revolution. For a period, the wine was sold as Château Certan-Marzelle, until it was acquired by the Giraud family in 1956, and was renamed Certan-Giraud.

The estate was included into the portfolio of Établissements Jean-Pierre Moueix when it was acquired by Christian Moueix in 1999, at which point the Giraud family asked that the Giraud name no longer be used. Considering renaming it Château Certan, Moueix consulted with the neighboring properties also bearing the Certan name, and while the Thienponts at Vieux Château Certan had no objections, Madame Bareau-Bader of Château Certan-de-May disapproved. The property was then divided into Hosanna, and the smaller plot producing Château Certan Marzelle.

== Production ==
The vineyard area extends 4.5 hectares with the grape varieties of 70% Merlot and 30% Cabernet Franc. The annual production averages 18,000 bottles of the Grand vin Château Hosanna.

== Château Certan Marzelle ==
This separated 2 hectare vineyard produces a wine of 100% Merlot. The annual production is typically 10,000 bottles.
