= Château Petit-Village =

Pomerol winery

Coordinates: 44.9242°N 0.2005°W

Château Petit-Village is a Bordeaux wine from the appellation Pomerol. The winery is located on the Right Bank of the Bordeaux wine region, in the commune of Pomerol in the department Gironde. As all wine produced in this appellation, Château Petit-Village is unclassified, but the estate is estimated among the great growths of the region.

Placed on the eastern outskirts of Pomerol and the hamlet Catusseau, the estate lies in a cluster with Château Beauregard, Vieux Château Certan and Château La Conseillante.

The château also produces a second wine named Le Jardin de Petit-Village.

== History ==
It is unknown who initially planted vine at the estate, but after the French Revolution, it was under the ownership of the Dufresne family, according to Henri Enjalbert, second generation Libournais vintners. When the estate was acquired by Fernand Ginestet in 1919, it caused some sensation as the first Libournais property bought by a leading Bordeaux négociant. It remained among the Ginestet properties, along with properties such as Château Margaux and Château Cos d'Estournel, until the difficult 1970s forced the Ginestets to divide their properties. Petit-Village was run by Bruno Prats until 1989 when it was sold to the insurance group AXA. It is owned by the company to date, currently under the management of Christian Seely.

After three years of preparation, Petit-Village began using new cellar facilities in February 2008, as well as expanded wine tourism facilities.

== Production ==
The estate consists of 10,5 hectares laid out in a triangular shape with the grape varieties of 75% Merlot, 17% Cabernet Franc and 8% Cabernet Sauvignon.

The annual production averages 3,500 cases of the Grand vin Château Petit-Village, and 1,300 cases of the second wine Le Jardin de Petit-Village.
