= Château L'Eglise‑Clinet =

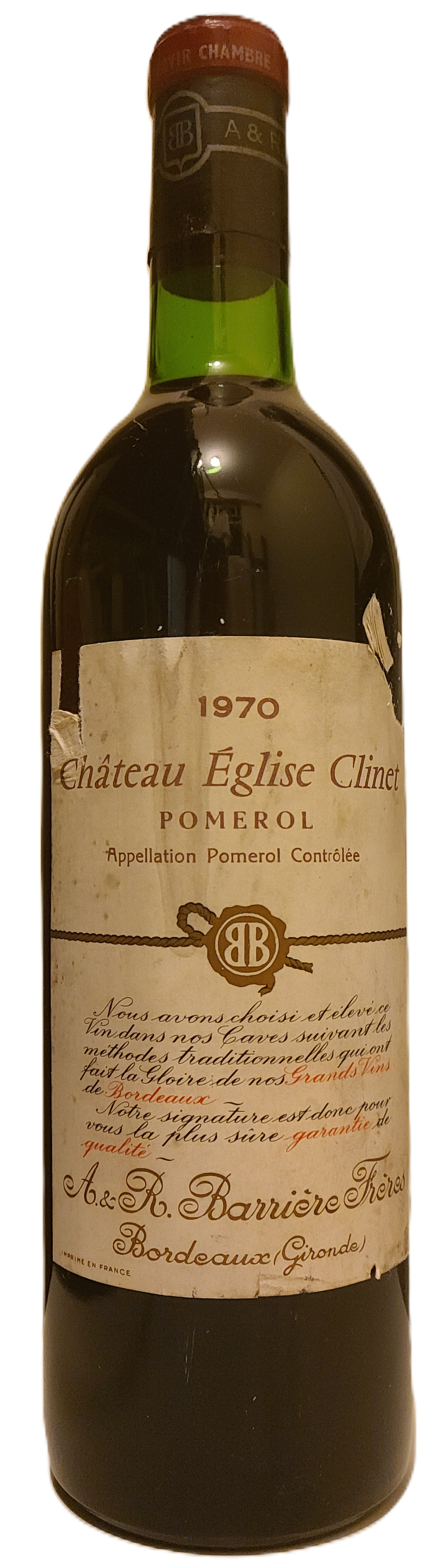
- Location: Pomerol, Bordeaux, France
- Appellation: Pomerol AOC
- Founded: 1803
- Key people: Denis Durantou (historic stewardship)
- Area cultivated: 12 acres (4.9 ha)
- Varietal: Merlot, Cabernet Franc
- Website: L'Eglise‑Clinet

Château L'Eglise‑Clinet is a Bordeaux wine from the appellation Pomerol. The winery is located on the Right Bank of the Bordeaux wine region in the commune of Pomerol in the department Gironde. Although wines from this appellation are unclassified, Château L'Eglise‑Clinet is recognized among the great growths of the region.

== History ==
The origins of Château L'Eglise‑Clinet date back to 1803, when Jean Rouchut first acquired vineyards adjacent to a small cemetery in Pomerol. In 1882, the estate expanded through the acquisition of neighboring plots from the Domaine de Clinet, a move that laid the foundation for its enduring reputation. Under the long-term stewardship of families such as the Durantou lineage, the château evolved into one of Pomerol’s most respected estates.

== Vineyard and Terroir ==
The vineyard of Château L'Eglise‑Clinet covers approximately 5 hectares (12 acres) and is planted at a density of around 5,000 vines per hectare. The estate's grape composition is predominantly 85% Merlot complemented by 15% Cabernet Franc, a blend that epitomizes the classic profile of Pomerol wines. The terroir is distinguished by deep clay and gravel soils, which provide excellent drainage and contribute to the concentrated, opulent character of the wines.

== Production ==
Château L'Eglise‑Clinet adheres to a winemaking philosophy that emphasizes minimal intervention, allowing the intrinsic qualities of the terroir and vintage to shine through. The estate produces approximately 1,500 cases (around 18,000 bottles) of its Grand Vin per vintage, reflecting both the limited size of the vineyard and the meticulous care in vineyard management and vinification.

== Reception ==
Critics consistently praise Château L'Eglise‑Clinet for its concentrated fruit, balanced tannins, and impressive aging potential. The estate’s wines are celebrated for their ability to express the unique nuances of Pomerol’s terroir, earning high scores from both traditional Bordeaux critics and international wine publications.
