= Château La Fleur-Pétrus =

Coordinates: 44.93061°N 0.20013°W

Château La Fleur-Pétrus is a Bordeaux wine from the appellation Pomerol. The winery is located on the Right Bank of the Bordeaux wine region, in the commune of Pomerol in the department Gironde. As all wine produced in this appellation, La Fleur-Pétrus is unclassified but the estate is estimated among the great growths of the region.

== History ==
Situated across the road from Château Pétrus adjacent to Château Lafleur, the vineyard lies on the high plateau of Pomerol where the soil is composed of variations of deep clay and gravel.

La Fleur-Pétrus was acquired by Jean Pierre Moueix in 1950, becoming a part of the négociant house Établissements Jean-Pierre Moueix which also owns Château Trotanoy. The estate was enlarged with the acquisition of vines from Château Le Gay in 1994.

== Production ==
The vineyard area extends over 18.7 hectares, with grape varieties of Merlot, Cabernet Franc, and Petit Verdot.
