= Château Beauregard =

Coordinates: 44.92289°N 0.20211°W

The 2005 Château Beauregard label depicting the château constructed in 1795–97.

Château Beauregard is a Bordeaux wine estate from the appellation Pomerol. The winery is located on the Right Bank of the Bordeaux wine region, in the commune of Pomerol in the department Gironde. As all wine produced in this appellation, Château Beauregard is unclassified but the estate is estimated among the great growths of the region.

Placed on the eastern outskirts of Pomerol and the hamlet Catusseau near Saint-Émilion, the estate lies in a cluster with Château Petit-Village, Vieux Château Certan and Château La Conseillante.

The estate also produces a second wine, Le Benjamin de Beauregard.

== History ==
Château Beauregard is a historic estate, established in the 11th century by the Knights Hospitallers of St. John of Jerusalem, while in terms of the initial viticulture, Beauregard was exemplified by Professor Henri Enjalbert as a prime Pomerol château from the first generation of the viticultural revolution. In the 18th century its owners were the Chaussade de Chandos family, who had a friendly rivalry with the Kanon family of Saint-Émilion's Château Canon.

In 1793 the property, then with 6.3 hectares (16 acres) under vine, was sold to Bonaventure Berthomeiu, a wealthy figure of Saint-Émilion. The present château was constructed in 1795–97; with its two towers and a moat, it is an unusually glamorous structure for the Pomerol district. After becoming one of the region's leading crus in the 19th century, the estate was bought by the Clauzel family in 1920.

Since 1991 Beauregard is owned by Crédit Foncière, while the estate is managed by Vincent Priou. Several recent vintages have been made with the consultation of the oenologist Michel Rolland.

== Production ==
The vineyard area extends 17.5 hectares (43 acres), with a grape variety distribution of 70% Merlot and 30% Cabernet Franc.

Of the Grand vin Château Beauregard there is annually produced 50,000 to 65,000 bottles, and of the second wine Le Benjamin de Beauregard (formerly Domaine des Douves) there is typically produced 25,000 to 35,000 bottles.

== Mille-Fleurs ==
In 1932 the architectural firm of Henry M. Polhemus and Lewis Augustus Coffin designed and built a replica of the château on the expansive Gould-Guggenheim estate in Port Washington, Long Island, NY, for Mrs Daniel Guggenheim named "Mille-Fleurs"; it still stands in a Nassau County park.

== In popular culture ==
- An account of working on the grape harvest at the château in the mid-1960s is given by Clive Jackson in Footloose in France.
