= Château Gazin =

Bordeaux winery producing Pomerol

Grand Vin 2007

L'hospitalet de Gazin 2000

Château Gazin is a Bordeaux wine from the appellation Pomerol. The winery is located on the Right Bank of the Bordeaux wine region, in the commune of Pomerol in the department Gironde. As all wine produced in this appellation, Château Gazin is unclassified, but the estate has since the 1840s been estimated among the great growths of Pomerol.

Situated on the Pomerol plateau, Château Gazin lies adjacent to Château Pétrus and in close proximity to estates such as Château L’Évangile, Château La Conseillante and Vieux Château Certan.

The château also produces a second wine named l'Hospitalet de Gazin.

== History ==
The origins of Château Gazin date back to the Middle Ages, when the land was owned by the Knights Hospitallers of St. John of Jerusalem (Knights of Malta). Between the 12th and 18th centuries, the Order developed the Pomerol vineyards after receiving donations of land near the Barbanne River. On the site of the present estate, they established a hospital to shelter pilgrims on the road to Santiago de Compostela.

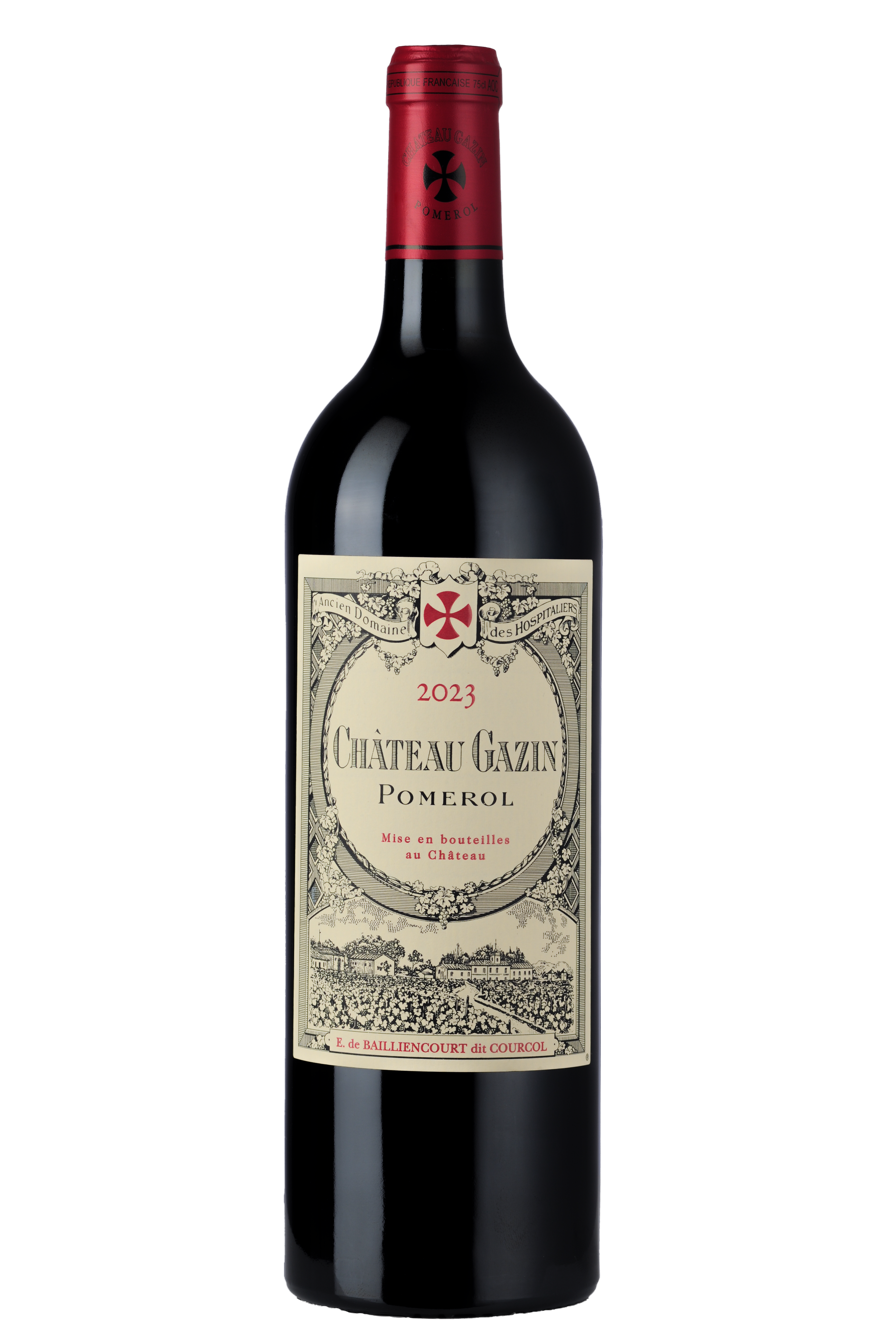
Chateau Gazin 2023

In the 18th century, Merlot was first mentioned in the region. The French Revolution marked the end of seven centuries of the Knights’ presence in Pomerol, with their properties confiscated as national goods.

During the 19th and 20th centuries, the estate evolved under successive owners who expanded and improved the vineyards. In 1918, Château Gazin, along with Château La Dominique in Saint-Émilion, was acquired by Louis Soualle, great-grandfather of the current owners, the Bailliencourt dit Courcol family.

In 1970, 4.5 hectares of Gazin vines were sold to Château Pétrus; Château La Dominique was sold separately to another owner. Despite this sale, the Bailliencourt family maintained and further developed Château Gazin, consolidating its reputation among the leading wines of Pomerol.

In 2018, the family celebrated 100 years of ownership in Pomerol, underscoring the continuity of their stewardship and their commitment to the legacy initiated by Louis Soualle. Today, Château Gazin remains entirely family-owned.

The present proprietors are Edouard and Elise de Bailliencourt dit Courcol, with Mickaël Obert as technical director and Rémi Beauche as winemaker.

== Production ==
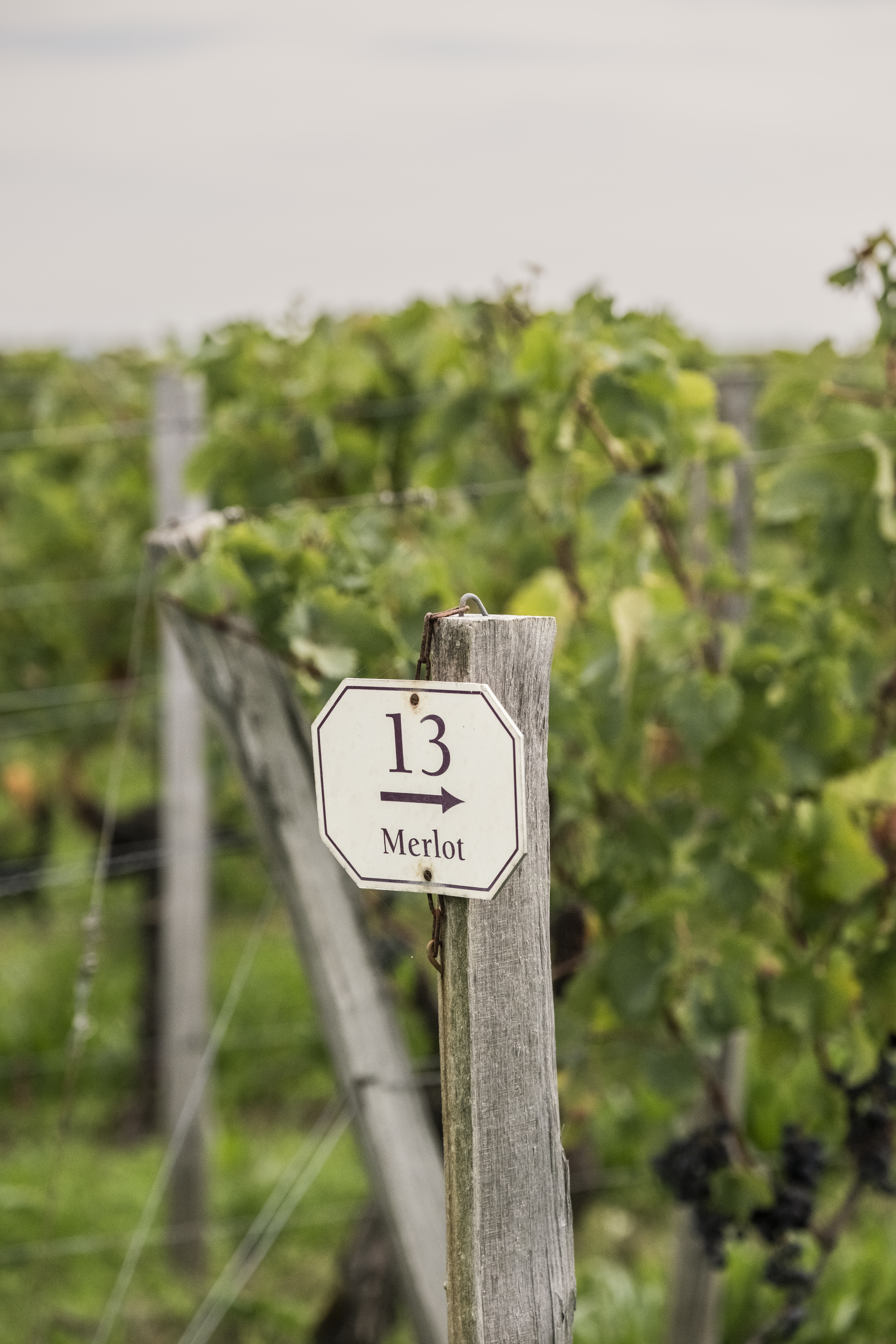
The vineyard of Château Gazin.

The estate consists of 24 hectares with the grape varieties of 85% Merlot, 8% Cabernet Sauvignon and 7% Cabernet Franc. The annual production averages 90,000 to 110 000 bottles wine.

== Gallery ==
2007 Back Label
