= Château Fonroque =

Château Fonroque is a Bordeaux wine from the appellation Saint-Émilion, ranked Grand cru classé in the Classification of Saint-Émilion wine. The winery is located in the Right Bank of France's Bordeaux wine region in the commune of Saint-Émilion, in the department Gironde.

== History ==
Château Fonroque came to the Moueix family in 1930 when it was purchased by Jean Moueix, who settled on the estate. After his death Fonroque was run by the son Jean-Antoine Moueix, and after his death, management passed on to the firm of his brother Jean-Pierre Moueix in 1979, whose team began extensive restoration of the vineyards and winery. In 2001, the estate came to Alain Moueix, who also runs the Pomerol estate Château Mazeyres.

== Production ==
The vineyard area extends 20 hectares with the grape varieties of approximately 70% Merlot and 30% Cabernet Franc. Of the Grand vin Château Fonroque there is a typically an annual production of 6,500 cases, with the second wine Château Cartier representing 25% of the harvest.
