= Pomerol AOC =

"Right bank" Bordeaux wine

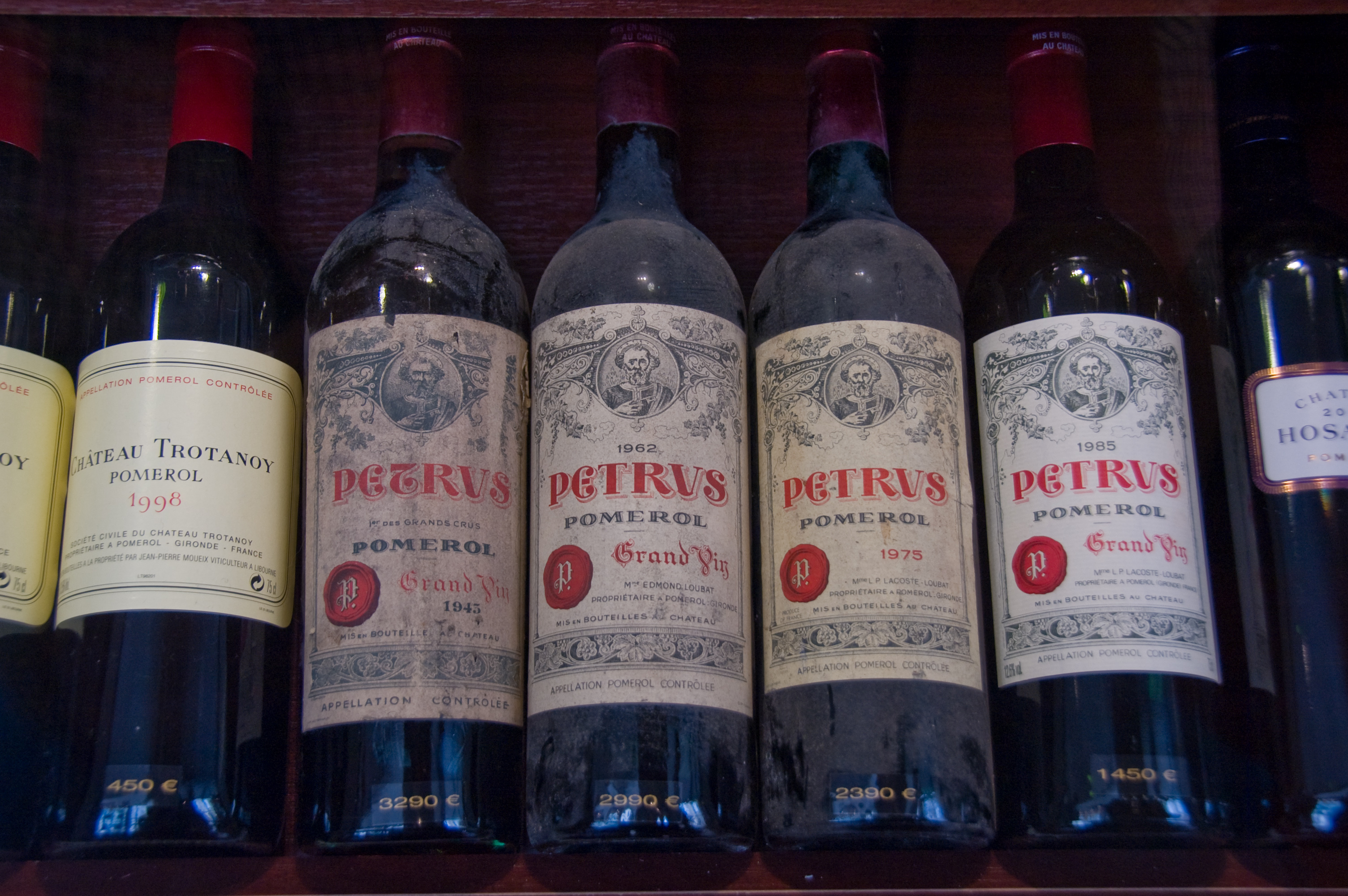
Château Pétrus from the Pomerol wine region

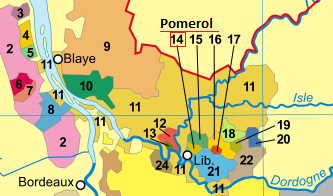
The Pomerol AOC (#14) within the "Right Bank" wine region of Bordeaux. It is located just north of the city of Liborne south of Lalande-de-Pomerol (#15), northwest of Saint-Émilion (#21) and east of Fronsac (#12). Also pictured in the map is the "Left Bank" wine regions of the Médoc including St-Estèphe (#3), Pauillac (#4), St-Julien (#5) and Margaux (#8).

Pomerol (French pronunciation: [pɔmʁɔl]) is a French wine-growing commune and Appellation d'origine contrôlée (AOC) within the Libournais ("Right Bank") in Bordeaux. The wine produced here is predominately from Merlot with Cabernet Franc playing a supporting role. Unlike most other Bordeaux communes, there is no real village of Pomerol, although there is a church. The houses are set among the vineyards.

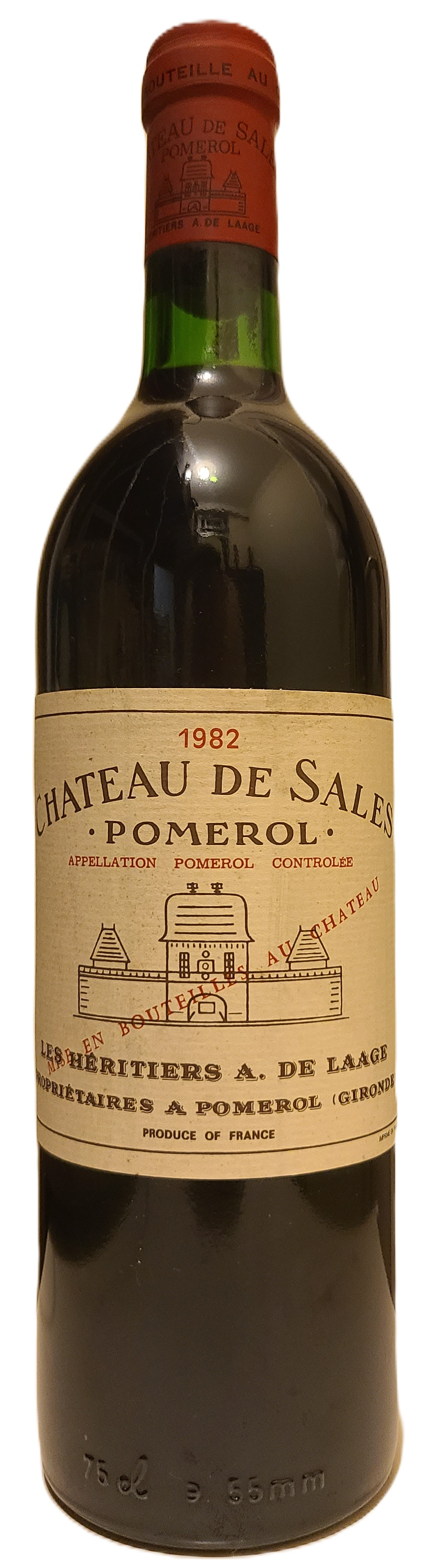
Largest vineyard in the appellation

The region was recognized as a distinct wine region apart from Saint-Émilion and the greater Libournais region by the French government in 1923 and was granted AOC status in 1936 as part of the first wave of AOC establishments by the Institut national de l'origine et de la qualité (INAO). While it is now one of the most prestigious of the Bordeaux AOCs, this situation is relatively recent, dating to the second half of the twentieth century, which is often given as one of the reasons why Pomerol is not included in any of the Bordeaux classifications.

Pomerol is the smallest of the major fine wine regions in Bordeaux, covering an area that is roughly 3 by 4 kilometres (1.9 by 2.5 mi) in size. It is roughly one-seventh of the size of its much larger Right Bank neighbor Saint-Émilion AOC and is on par with the smallest Left Bank commune of Saint-Julien AOC in the Médoc. In 1998, there were 784 hectares (1,940 acres) of grape vines planted within the AOC boundaries producing 36,066 hectolitres (952,800 US gallons) or 400,733 cases of wine. In 2003 there were 150 declared producers in Pomerol harvesting 780 hectares (1,900 acres) and producing a year average of 32,250 hectolitres (852,000 US gal) (around 358,333 cases) of wine. Almost all the wine is estate-bottled. Unlike other French wine regions, such as Burgundy and the Rhône Valley, there are no co-operatives currently operating in Pomerol. By 2007, the area planted to grape vine had risen slightly to 800 hectares (2,000 acres). In 2009, there were 140 declared producers in Pomerol, have an average surface area of 6 hectares (15 acres) and the vineyard of the "Pomerol" appellation covers 800 hectares (2,000 acres) for an average production of 35,000 hectolitres (920,000 US gal) per year.

While many Pomerol wines now fetch very high prices at wine auctions and in the private market on a par with the most highly rated classified growths of Bordeaux, there is no official classification of Pomerol wine. However, the region does contain one property widely held to be equivalent to premier cru: Château Pétrus.

== History ==
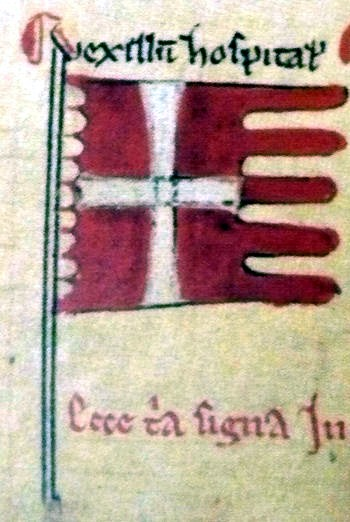
After the Crusades, many returning Knights Hospitaller established themselves in the Libourne/Pomerol area building hospitals and hostels.

The Pomerol region, and its northern border, the Barbanne river was historically considered the frontier boundary between the north where people spoke the Langues d'oïl and the south where they spoke the Langue d'oc. Though it is difficult to pinpoint exactly when grapes were first planted in the Pomerol region there is enough evidence to show that viticulture was present in the area during the time of the Romans. Similarly there is uncertainty as to the origins of the name "Pomerol", although there is some speculation that it stems from the Latin word poma which refers to a fruit bearing seeds and is the origin of the French word pomme, meaning apple. This theory is supported by the region's long history of polyculture with many other crops, particularly fruits and grains, being cultivated in the area long before viticulture became a primary focus.

In 1270, the English founded the city of Libourne, which may have brought the vineyards of Pomerol to wider attention. However, as with most of Bordeaux, the wines of Pomerol were of lesser repute than the wines from further up the Garonne in the present-day departments of Tarn-et-Garonne and Lot-et-Garonne. The area's location along the major pilgrimage route to Santiago de Compostela in Spain also attracted the interest of the Knights Hospitaller, returning Crusaders who set up several hostels and hospitals in the region. Several of these establishments, such as the Gazin hospital, which was first mentioned in 1288, are now the sites of modern vineyards and wineries such as Château Gazin. The Knights remained in the region for several centuries, even helping to replant vineyards that were devastated by Hundred Years War.

== Transition from white wines to red ==
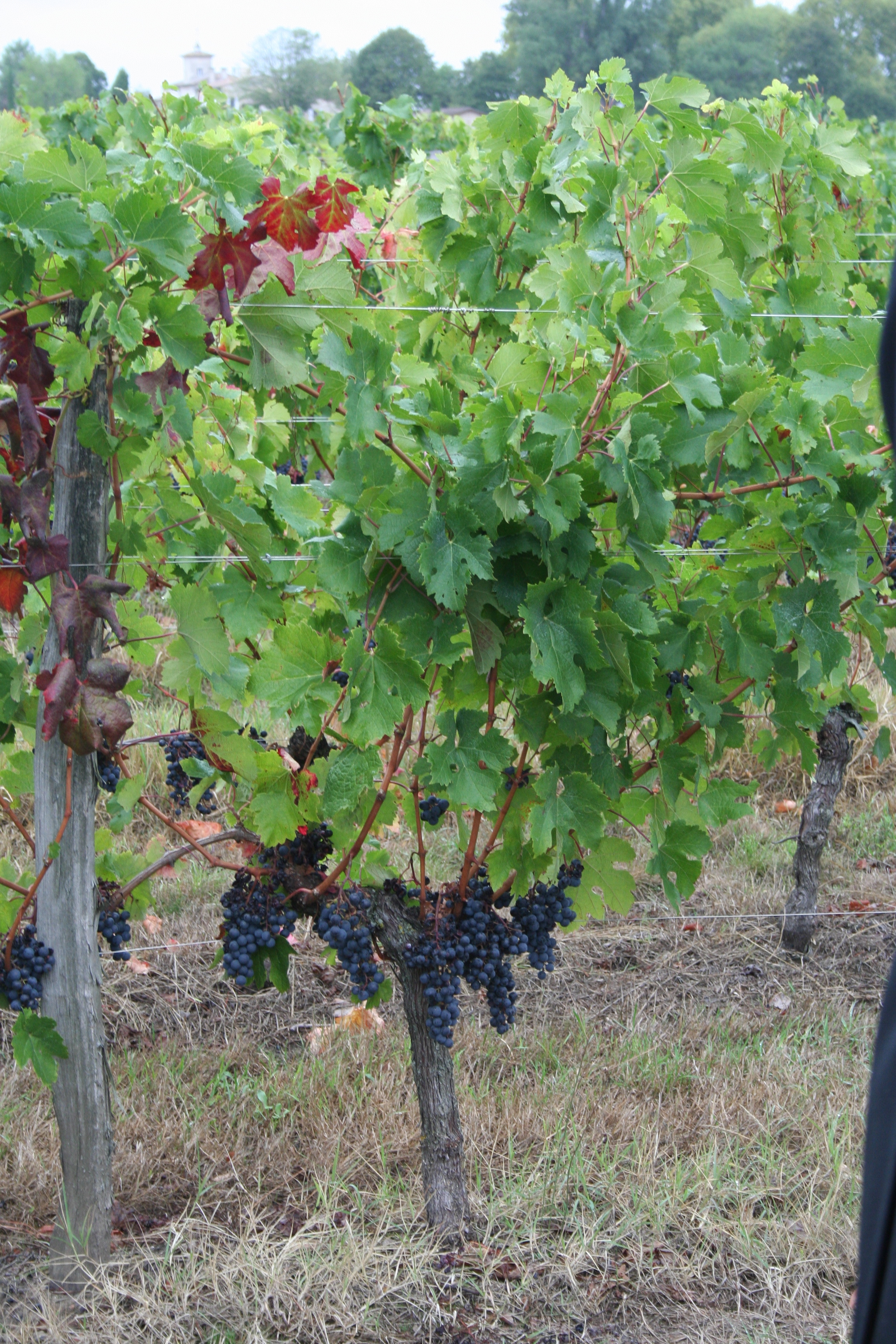
Since 1936, the planting of white grape varieties has been strictly prohibited in Pomerol with Merlot (pictured) being the dominant grape in the AOC.

In the 16th and 17th centuries, Dutch traders wielded considerable influence over the wine trade in the Bordeaux market. While the Dutch were most notable for draining the marshes of Médoc and paving the way for viticulture in the land north of Graves, they offered the communes of the right bank of the Dordogne a market in Northern Europe (particularly the Baltic and Hanseatic states) bypassing the grip that the port of Bordeaux had on the English market. However, the taste of the Dutch and these northern markets leant towards white wines and it was white grape varieties that were most widely planted in Pomerol during this period.

The transition to red grape varieties was slow. Plantings of Cabernet Franc in the Pomerol area were recorded, under the names Vidure and Bidure, as early as the 16th century but Merlot does not appear to have been introduced to the area until a couple of hundred years later. In 1760, Louis-Léonard Fontémong, a Libournais négociant, planted what appears to be the first documented instance of Merlot in the region, in a vineyard that is now part of Château Rouget. However, white wine grapes continued to dominate the vineyards of Pomerol until the late 19th century when the higher prices of red clarets and the waning Dutch influence made red wine production more enticing. When the region received its full AOC status in 1936, the AOC regulation specifically outlawed the plantings of any white grape varieties in Pomerol.

Even after its complete transformation into a red wine region, the reputation of Pomerol still lagged far behind that of the Médoc. A 1943 comparative price list commissioned by the Vichy government listed Pétrus only at the level of a mid-tier Second Growth from the Médoc with the next highest rated Pomerol estates, Vieux Château Certan and Château La Conseillante commanding prices in line with Third Growth estates like Château Giscours and Château La Lagune.

=== Moueix family and ascent to prominence ===
Jean-Pierre Moueix and his family are widely credited with putting Pomerol "on the international map". Born in the central French department of Corrèze, Moueix moved to the Bordeaux region with his family and first attempted to open up a négociant house in the city of Bordeaux itself. However, he found that market heavily saturated, so he moved across the river to the Libournais region and opened up a négociant house in the city of Libourne in 1937. In 1945, Moueix acquired exclusive selling rights to Château Pétrus.

At first, Moueix mostly traded with Pomerol's traditional market in Belgium. However, as Moueix began buying and leasing properties and exhibiting more creative control over the winemaking process he began looking to expand Pomerol's recognition on the world market. In 1953 he purchased Château Trotanoy and Château La Fleur-Pétrus followed by Château Lagrange in 1959. Then in 1964, Moueix acquired majority share in Pétrus and fully took over the supervision and direction of winemaking.

The 1982 vintage was a watershed moment for Moueix and Pomerol. Aided by a strong US dollar and the glowing reviews of American wine critic Robert M. Parker, Jr., the region gained a strong foothold in the American market and helped propel estates like Pétrus to unprecedented prices on the auction circuit.

In addition to Pétrus, the Moueix family also owns Château La Grave, Château Latour à Pomerol and Château Hosanna.

== Climate and viticulture ==
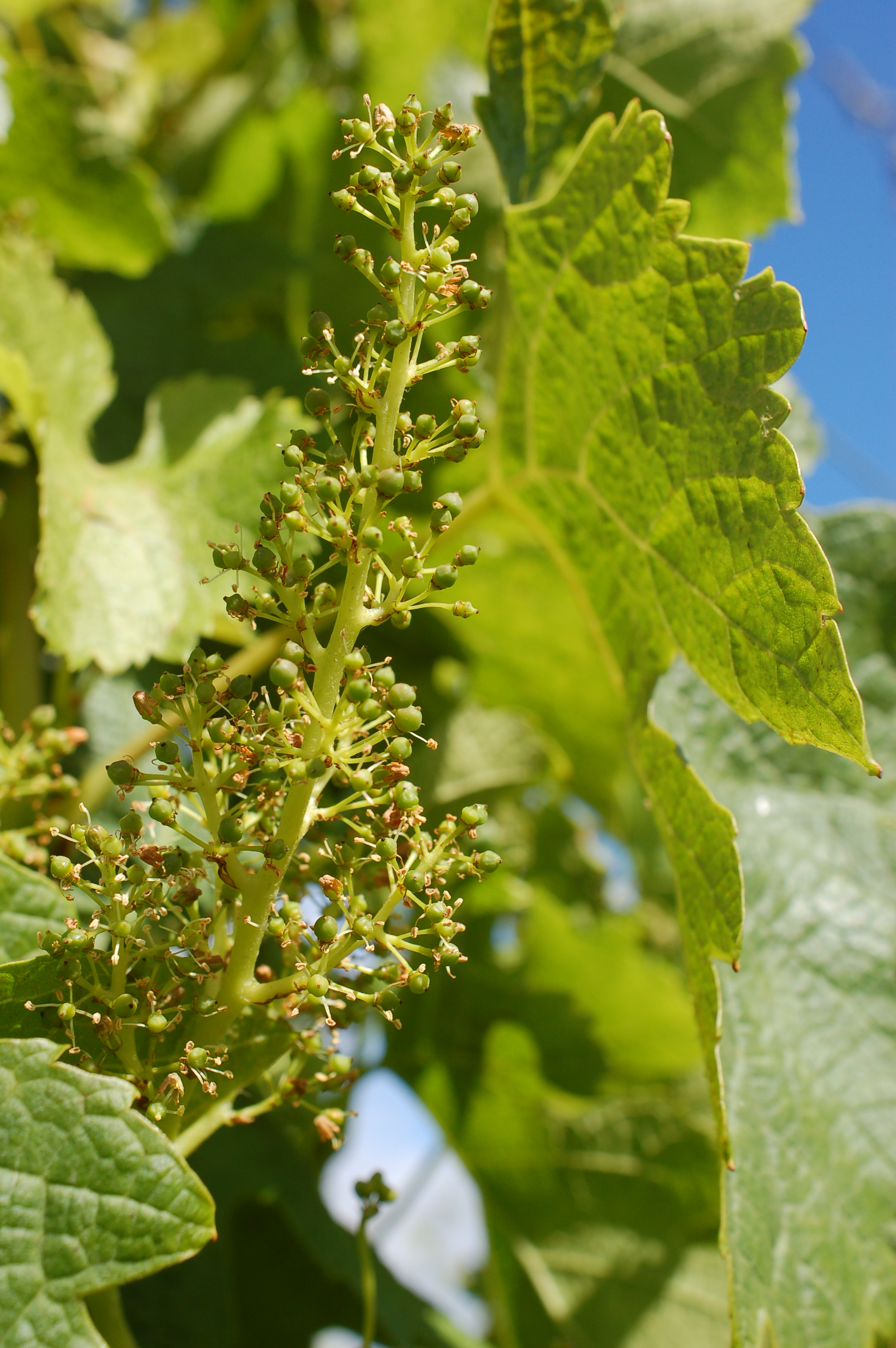
Merlot is highly prone to coulure where the flowers of the vine fail to get pollinated and develop into berries which can create difficulties in Pomerol if the weather is wet during flowering.

While the climate of Pomerol is broadly similar to the rest of Bordeaux in the maritime influence, the region's distance from the sea and the Gironde estuary make the climate distinctly more continental than that of the Médoc. This means that Pomerol sees more diurnal temperature variation during the growing season, between daytime highs and evening lows. Also while the region experiences more rainfall during the spring (which can cause problems for Merlot during flowering) there is overall significantly less rainfall during the summer months after veraison.

Nevertheless, the threat of harvest rains is still present in Pomerol, especially for winemakers employing the philosophy of "extended hanging" time in order to prolong the ripening process. When rain does occur it can pose a significant risk of grey rot, especially for Merlot planted on heavy clay soils which tend to retain water. While some wineries, such as Château Pétrus, can afford the labor costs of covering their vineyard in plastic sheeting to prevent water from soaking down into the roots and employ helicopters to hover over their vineyards, generating wind to dry out the grapes, not every property can take such measures.

While very hot vintages (such as 2003 and 2009) can create problems of over-ripeness in Merlot, the Pomerol region (and the Right Bank as a whole) tend to fare better during cooler years (such as 2006 and 2008). The main viticultural hazards are spring time frosts, which can occur frequently in the Pomerol region and disrupt entire vintages.

== Geography ==
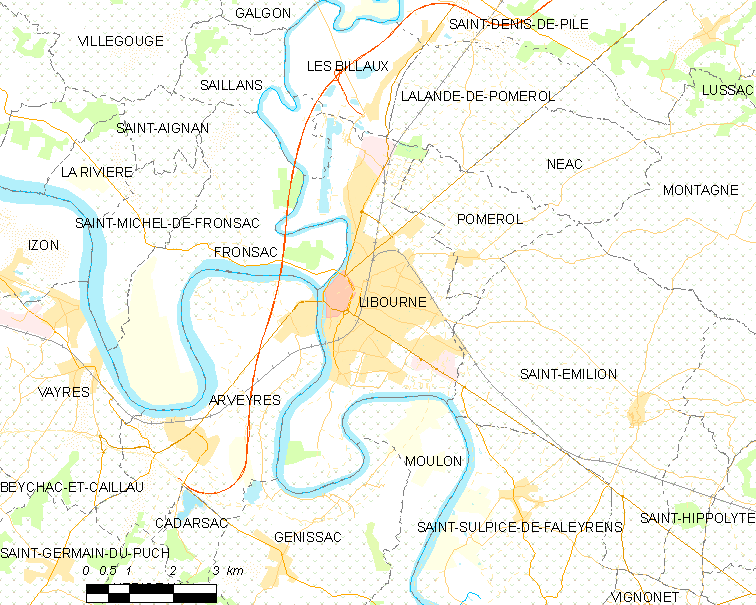
Pomerol is a sub-region in the Libournais which is located on the "right bank" of the Dordogne river as it flows westward into the Gironde Estuary which is home to the "left bank" wine regions of Médoc.

Pomerol lies immediately to the east and north-east of Libourne. Unlike most of the most prestigious communes of Bordeaux, it has no direct river access, being separated from the Dordogne to the south by the town and by Saint-Émilion, which lies to the south-east. To the north-east, across a stream called la Barbanne Rau lies Lalande-de-Pomerol. It stands on a gravel bank (a feature it shares with the prestigious appellations of the Médoc); towards the south and west, the soil is more sandy, while towards the north and east, it tends to clay. The sub-soil is dark packed clay, with a high iron content. The terrain is relatively flat with slight undulating slopes that fall from a height of 35–40 metres (115–131 ft) above sea level over a course of 2 kilometres (1.2 mi) to around 10 metres (33 ft).

Most of the more highly rated estates in Pomerol are located in the eastern half the region, up to the border of Saint-Émilion where the vineyards of the Premier Grand Cru Classé (A) estate of Château Cheval Blanc can often be seen from the Pomerol estates themselves. The southernmost reaches of Pomerol extend past the hamlet of Catusseau whereas just north of the hamlet the soil contains some of the finest gravel particles in the region. In the northeast is the hamlet of Maillet which borders the AOCs of Lalande-de-Pomerol, Montagne-Saint-Émilion and Saint-Émilion with the road running through the hamlet itself being the official boundary between Pomerol and Saint-Émilion. This has led to some legal issues as a few vineyards which are technically within the borders of Saint-Émilion but extend into Pomerol have had to be granted "honorary citizenship of Pomerol".

=== Vineyard soils ===
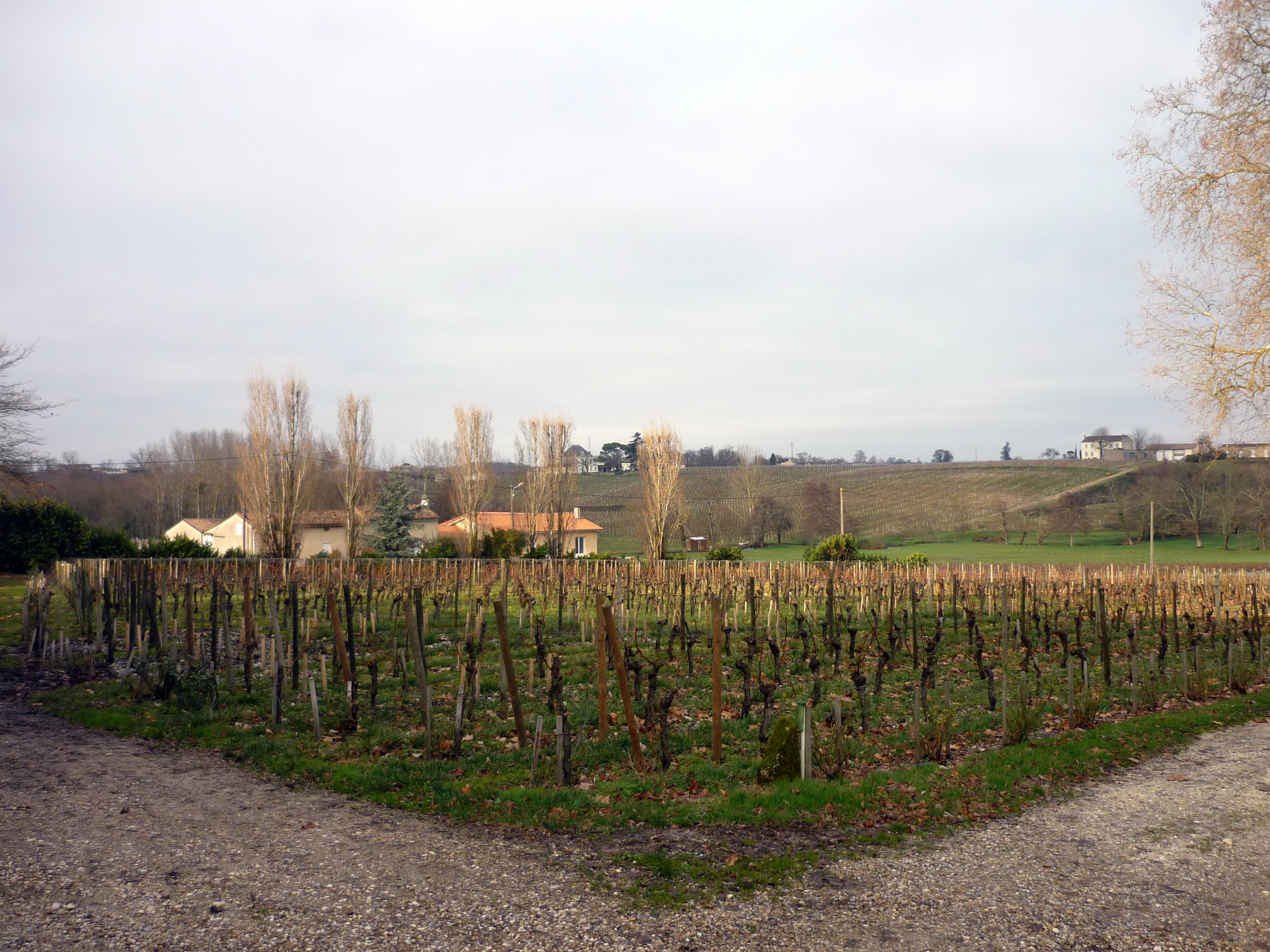
The soils of Pomerol are varied and include a mixture of clay, gravel and sand.

The soils of the Pomerol region are very diverse with a mixture of gravel, sand and clay scattered across the plateau. Roughly speaking the vineyard soils to the north and east, closer to the border of Saint-Émilion tend to have more clay while the soils to the west and south become lighter and more gravelly. The plateau on which Pomerol sits is bordered by three rivers, the Barbanne to the north, the Isle to the west and Dordogne and the city of Libourne to the south. As the terrain moves down the slopes of the plateau and towards these rivers the soils become more alluvial and sandy.

The majority of the Pomerol plateau is made up of sandy clay marl that is layered with gravel that dates back to the Günzian period (and is the same gravel found in the Médoc and Graves AOC), with the gravel on the lower slopes closer to Libourne coming from younger Mindel glaciation period. The vines on the lighter, sandier soils tend to ripen earlier than those on soils with higher clay content but also tend to have less powerful fruit and aging potential.

==== Molasse and Crasse de fer ====
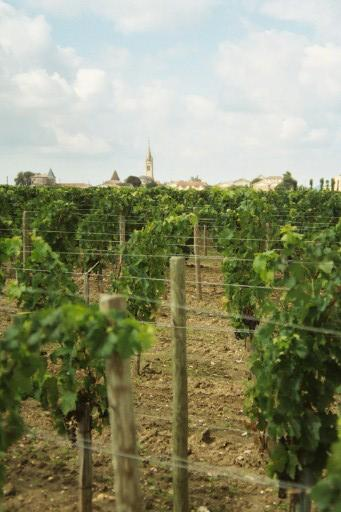
One of the vineyards owned by Château Pétrus

Within the region of Pomerol lies what is described as a bouttonière (or "buttonhole") of unique blue-clay (known as molasse) sitting on top of band of sand rich in iron deposits that is known as crasse de fer or machefer. This is a small region of only about 20 hectares (49 acres) that is very atypical of the soils found in rest of Pomerol, but because the vineyard of the noted estate of Château Pétrus is planted on more than half of these hectares, its influence on the wine has been much discussed in the literature. Other vineyards which have at least some planting on this bouttonière include Château La Conseillante, Château L'Évangile, Château Lafleur, Château Gazin, Château Trotanoy, Château Clinet, Château le Gay, Château Haut Ferrand and Vieux Château Certan.

According to Catherine Moueix the "clinkers" of iron tinted sand adds aroma notes of violets and truffles while Alexandre Thienpont of Vieux Château Certan says its benefits are more viticultural, in limiting the vigor and excessive leaf growth of the vine. However, despite its association with Château Pétrus, not every wine grower in Pomerol extols the virtues of having crasse de fer on their property. Denis Durantou of Château L'Église-Clinet believes that iron-rich soils is too impermeable to allow the vines' roots to descend deeply in the soil, which is a feature often associated with high quality terroir. He has been working to break up the ferruginous bands on his property and at other estates at which he consults.

Durantou also believes that many of the benefits attributed to the blue-clay bouttonière exist apart from the crasse de fer, namely the clay's ability to retain moisture in dry years and produce wines of body and power, and notes that there is a second bouttonière of this blue-clay without the iron deposit located northwest of Pétrus. Among the vineyards with at least some planting on this second bouttonière are Château L'Église-Clinet, Château Trotanoy, Château Clos l'Église, Château La Cabanne and Château Nenin.

== Winemaking ==
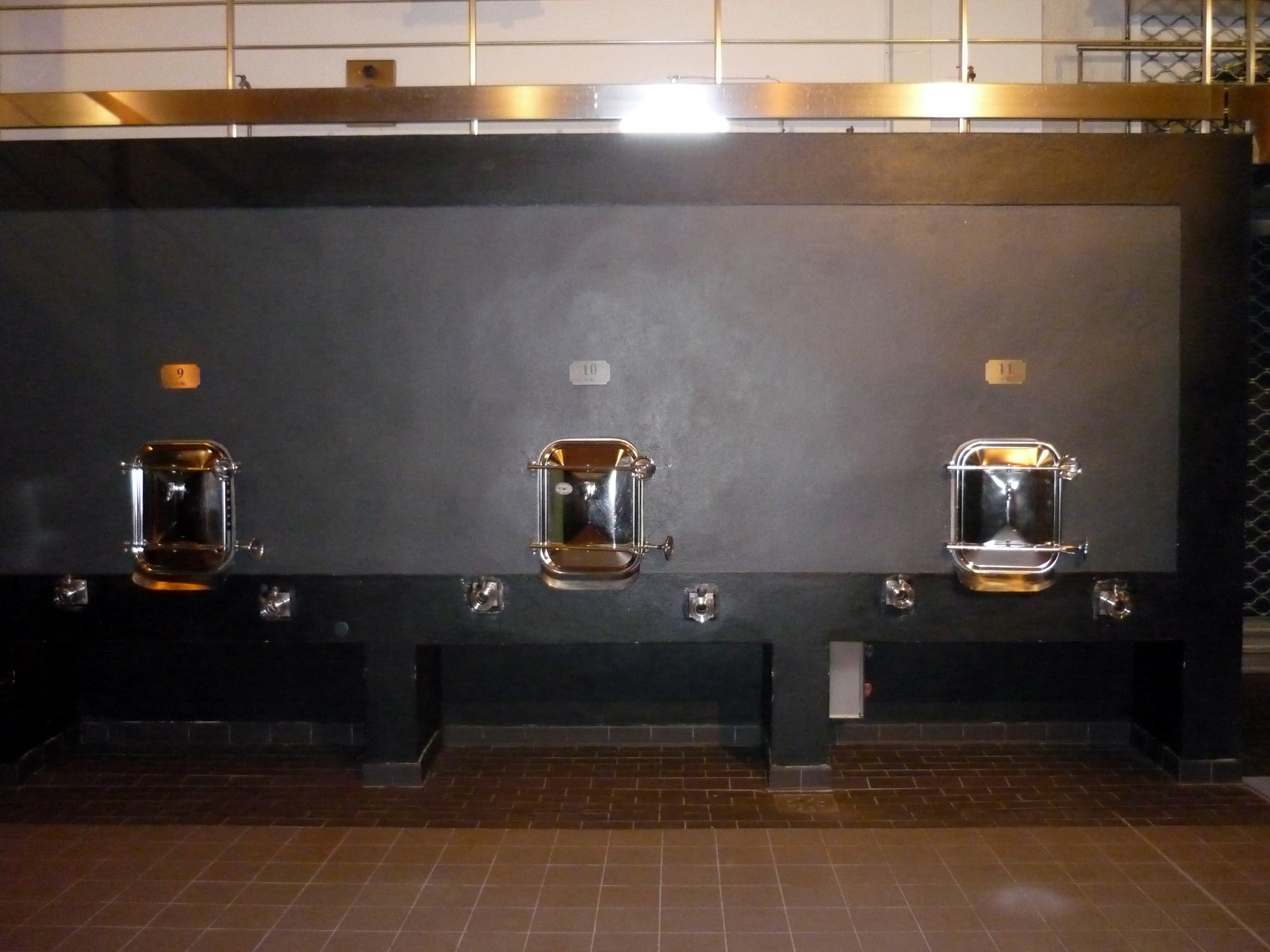
Concrete fermentors used at Château l'Evangile

For most of the 20th century, the winemaking styles of Pomerol were influenced by University of Bordeaux oenologist Émile Peynaud and his work on the Cabernet Sauvignon grape in the Médoc. While Peynaud's techniques were largely successful in the Médoc, they did not always translate well to Pomerol. Not only was this region working with a different grape, but also with different soil conditions that were cooler (despite the overall warmer climate). In this climate Cabernet Sauvignon didn't ripen well but Merlot grapes being harvested at the same sugar levels as Cabernet Sauvignon on the Left Bank would produce under-ripe flavors and "hard wine". It wasn't until the 1980s when more Pomerol producers began developing "Right Bank" techniques, including extended hanging time to ripen the Merlot grapes more fully, that the style associated with Pomerol wines today evolved.

As with most wine regions, the style of winemaking varies by winemaker and by vintage. In general, many Pomerol winemakers practice 15 to 21 days maceration and press when the wine has reached full dryness. The wine almost always goes through malolactic fermentation. The wine will receive 18 to 20 months of aging in barriques prior to bottling and release.

Tradition in Pomerol has been to separate the free-run wine and blend back in a proportion of the vin de presse as needed depending on the vintage. The rest of the press wine would often be used in the estate's second wine or sold to négociants. The timing of the blending (such as during or after fermentation) will vary by estate with some houses such as Château Pétrus adding the vin de presse during fermentation in order to allow the wine components to mature together and, theoretically, reduce the harshness of the typically more tannic and phenolic press wine.

As with many Bordeaux estates, the basket press has come back into vogue but with modern elements such as pneumatic controls. Jean-Claude Berrouet, one of the head winemakers for the Moueix estates helped designed a vertical basket press aimed at more gently handling the pomace and this has been adopted by several estates.

=== Influence of Michel Rolland and contrasting philosophy ===
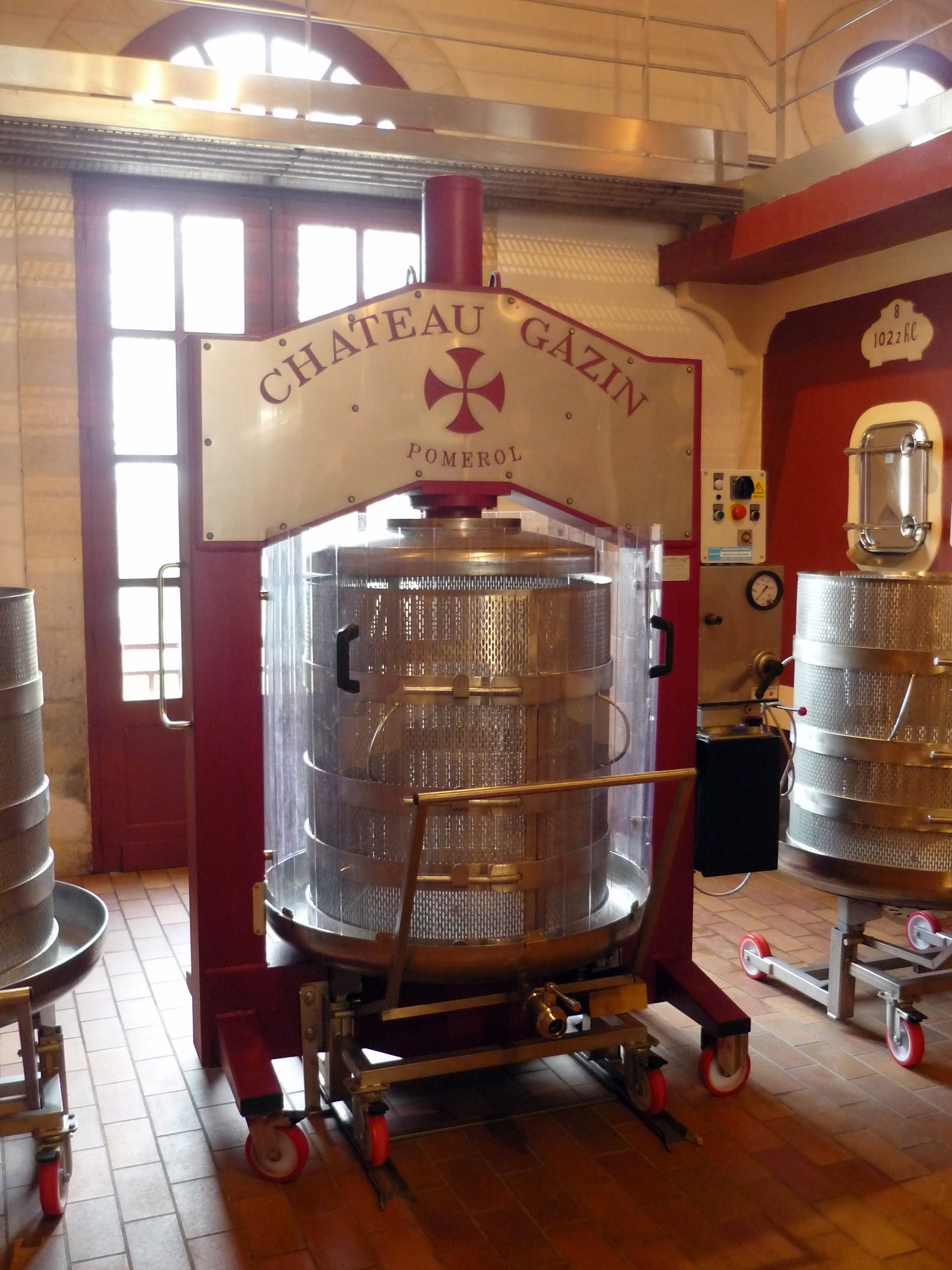
An example of a basket press used at Château Gazin

World-renowned winemaker Michel Rolland was born in the Pomerol region and has a family estate, Château Le Bon Pasteur, that he co-owns with his wife Dany. As Rolland rose to prominence in the 1980s and 1990s, aided by a style that favored the palate of wine critic Robert Parker, many Pomerol wine estates began adopting the "Rolland style" either by imitation or by hiring Rolland as a consultant winemaker.

This style includes delaying harvest as much as possible to give the grapes a long, extended hang time to produce full "physiological ripeness" which can give the fruit an "over-ripe" flavor and the wine alcohol levels over 14%. In the chai the must often goes through an extended period of maceration (3 to 8 weeks) followed aging in new oak barrels.

In contrast, the "Moueix style" places a premium on vibrancy and freshness in the fruit flavor with Moueix owned estates like Trotanoy and Pétrus often among the first estates to pick.

== Wine ==
Pomerol now produces exclusively red wine, although 100 years ago it produced a great volume of white. Merlot is the most important grape here, accounting for 80% of the vineyard area. Although it is almost invariably blended, the proportion of Merlot can reach as high as 95%, though it is more usually in the range 70–80%. The next most important grape is Cabernet Franc, locally known as le Bouchet, accounting for around 15% of the vineyard area and usually accounting for 5–20% of the blend. Malbec, known locally as Pressac, and not much planted in the rest of Bordeaux, is also used. The remaining permitted grapes, Cabernet Sauvignon and Petit Verdot, are barely planted and rarely used in the grand vin though, like Malbec, they may appear in an estate's second wine.

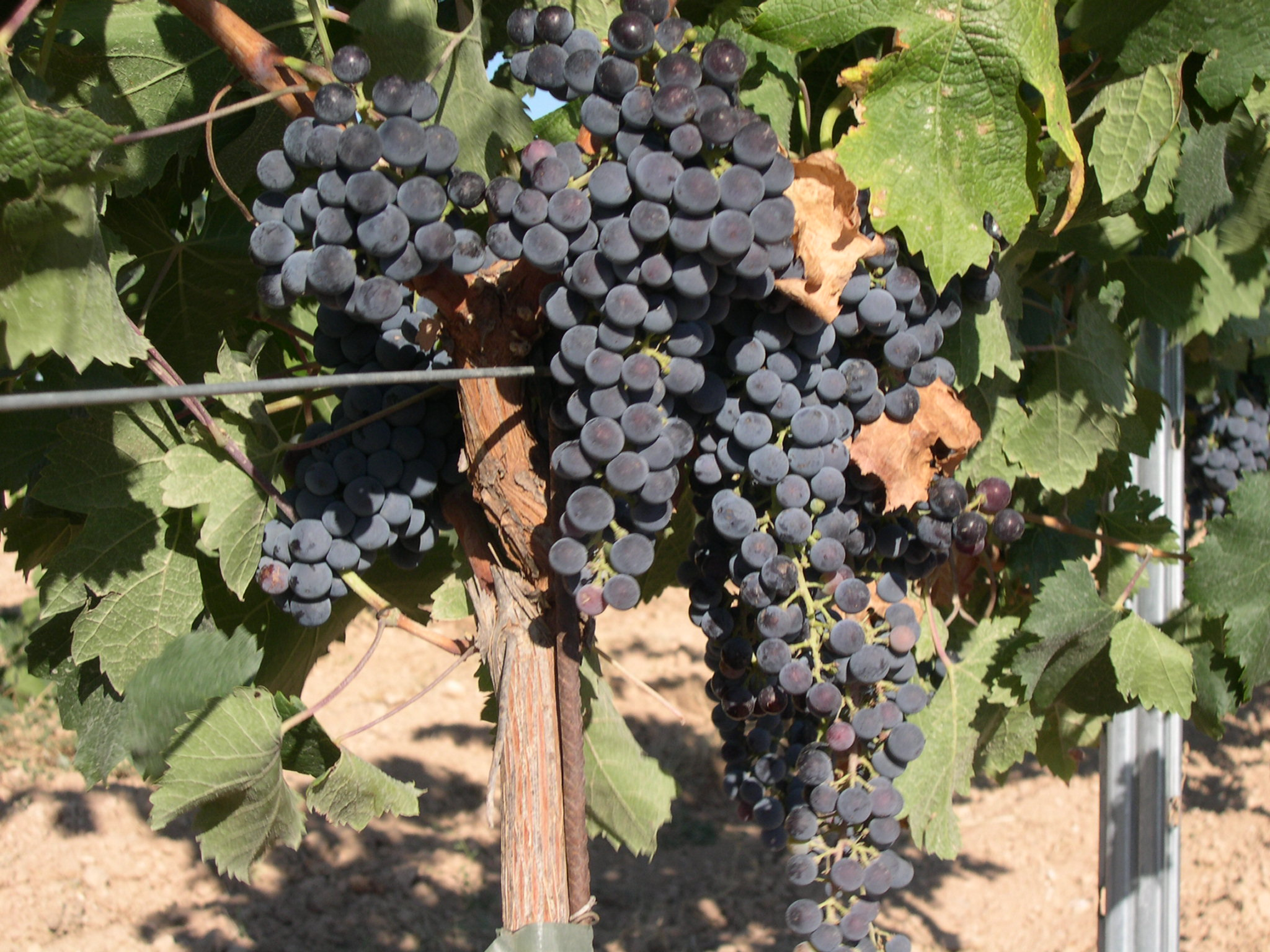
Merlot is the most widely planted grape in Pomerol.

In the early 20th century, as Pomerol's transition to a red wine producing district was completed, Cabernet Franc was the dominant grape variety. However, an early spring frost in 1956 killed a large portion of the Cabernet Franc plantings and many estates took this event as an opportunity to replant with the higher yielding and earlier ripening Merlot. Despite Merlot's tendency to suffer from coulure if the weather is cold and rainy during flowering, the grape quickly rose to prominence in Pomerol and has become the grape most closely associated with the region. Nevertheless, very few Pomerols are pure Merlot and Cabernet Franc is still valued for the tannic structure and acidity it gives, which can add longevity and aging potential to the wines. In fact, as the trend of the late 20th and early 21st century towards harvesting Merlot later and at increasingly higher sugar levels has continued, the role of Cabernet Franc in balancing the opulent but potentially flabby nature of over ripe Merlot has become even more appreciated by Pomerol winemakers.

In general, Merlot tends to be planted on predominantly clay soils while Cabernet Franc is more likely to be on limestone outcroppings and Cabernet Sauvignon and Malbec planted in the more gravelly soils.

Among the few estates with plantings of Cabernet Sauvignon are Vieux Château Certan, Château Beauregard, Château Certan de May, Château Gazin, Château Nenin and Château Petit-Village. Château La Conseillante is among the estates with plantings of Malbec.

=== AOC regulations ===
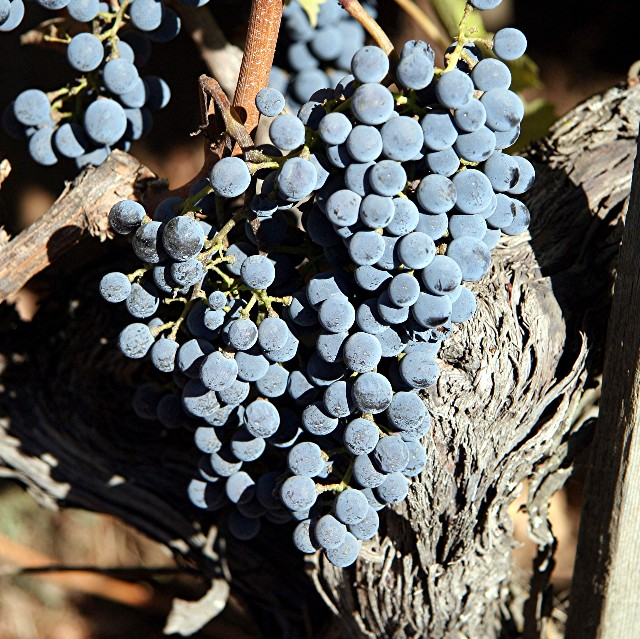
Cabernet Franc is often added to enhance the aromatics of the wine and to balance the fruit of Merlot with structure and acidity.

Pomerol is exclusively a red wine with the only permitted grape varieties for AOC wine being Merlot, Cabernet Franc (Bouchet), Cabernet Sauvignon and Malbec (Pressac). Harvest yields are restricted to a maximum of 42 hectoliters/hectare (≈ 2.2 tons/acre) with the finished wine needing to attain a minimum alcohol level of at least 10.5%.

Wine from Pomerol may be labelled as Bordeaux or Bordeaux Supérier (declassified): this would typically happen if the producer felt that the wine was not of a sufficiently high standard to merit the Pomerol label.

=== Styles and aging ===
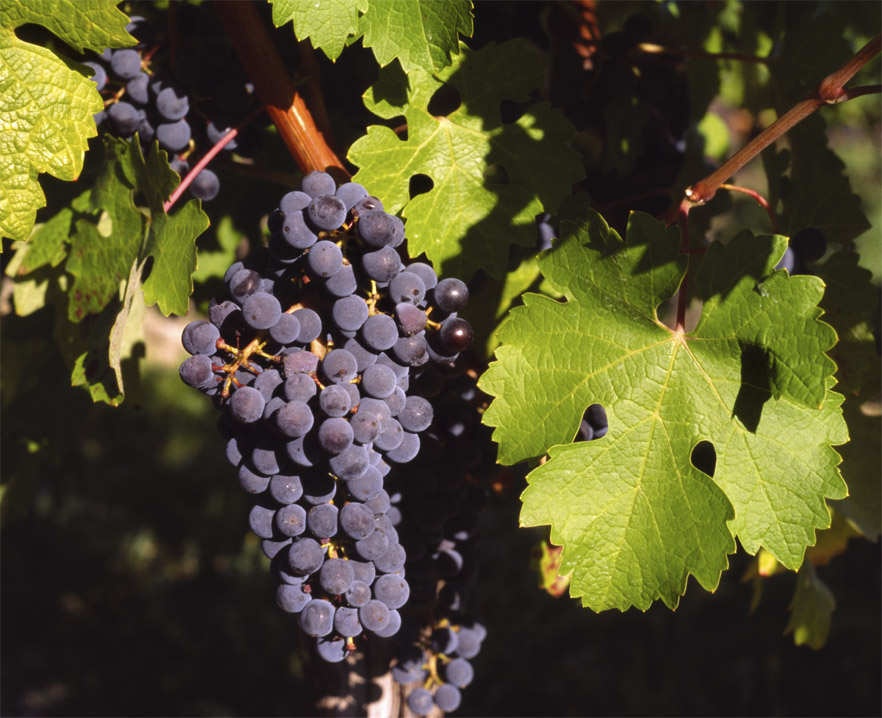
Cabernet Sauvignon is not widely grown in the cold soils of Pomerol but more producers are planting the variety.

The style of the wine varies with the terroir. In the west, where the soil is more sandy, the wines are lighter; in the south, where the soil is more gravelly, the proportion of Merlot is lower, and the wines tend more towards the flavors of the Médoc.

The wine has been described as 'velvety' or 'unctuous'. The characteristic fruit flavor is plum, sometimes tending towards prune. According to wine expert Oz Clarke, Pomerols can have, in addition to the characteristic plum notes, honeyed spice, truffles, peppermint, chocolate, roasted nuts and raisin notes with a creamy, sometimes buttery mouthfeel and supple tannins.

Master of Wine Clive Coates describes Pomerols as a "halfway house" between the soft, plump, flesh fruit of a Saint-Émilion and the austerity and backbone associated with the wines of the Médoc. Coates notes that Pomerols tend to have less "fruitcakey" flavors than Saint-Émilion with more rich, velvety and plum notes compared to the dominant "blackcurrant" notes in most Médocs. This concentrated rich fruit stems from the nature of Merlot which also allows the wines of Pomerol to be less overtly tannic than the Cabernet Sauvignon-based wines of the Médoc.

According to wine expert and Master of Wine Hugh Johnson, Pomerol requires less aging than most Bordeaux: five years is usually sufficient, and 12 years is enough even for the grandest vintages. Johnson notes that Pomerols are usually distinguished by their deep color and sometimes creamy, concentrated ripe-plum flavors but without the high acidity and tannins that are typical of other Bordeaux wines.

== Châteaux ==
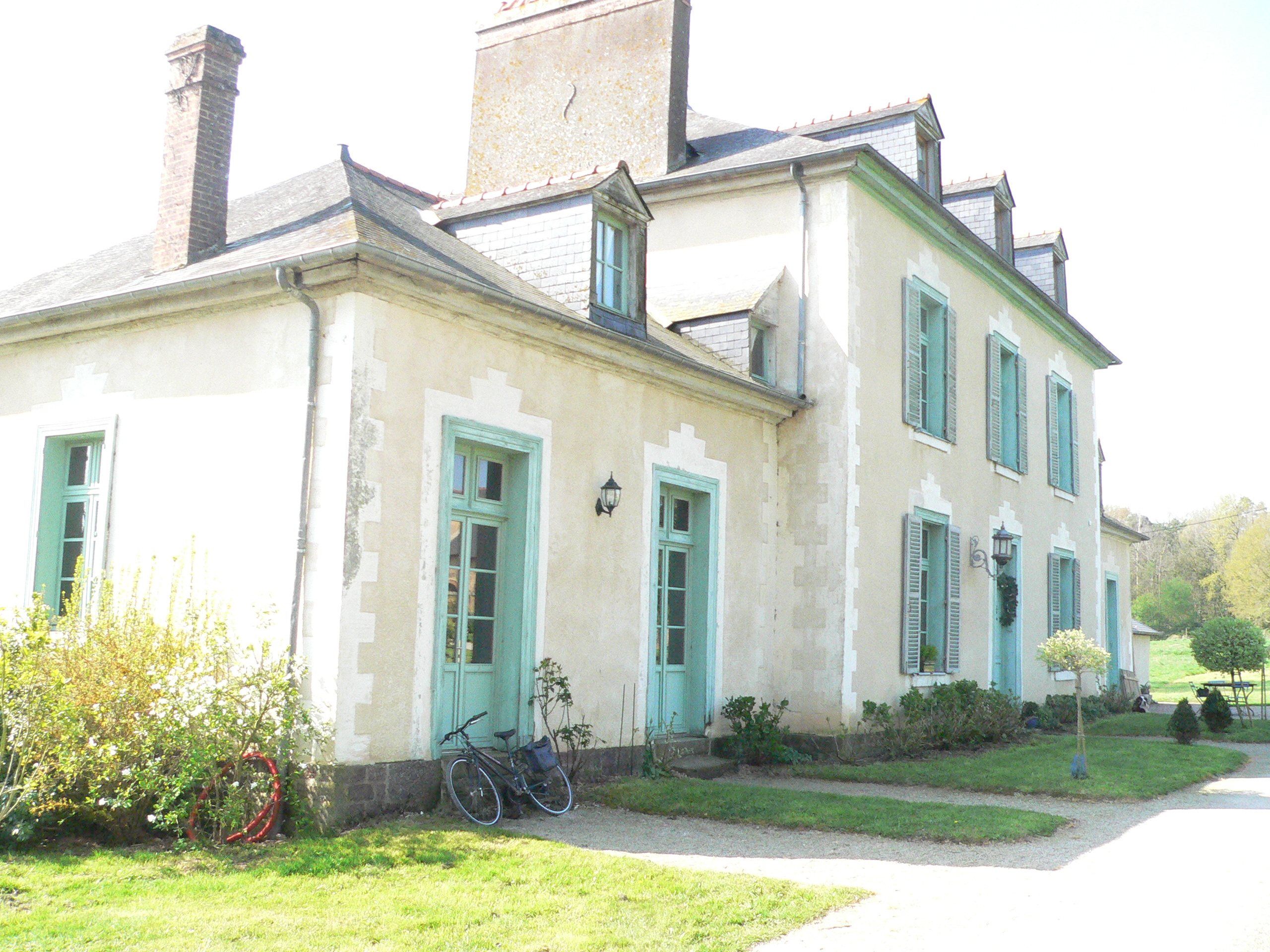

There is no official classification for the châteaux of Pomerol. While the reason for this is often touted as the relatively recent prominence of Pomerol on the world market, even now with the wines of Pomerol generating worldwide acclaim and recognition, many of the producers still feel that an official ranking of Pomerol estates is not needed. Some producers, such as Nicolas de Bailliencourt of Château Gazin, believe most of the opposition is from small growers who fear being left off any ranking making their wines perceived to be inferior. Another proprietor told wine writer Stephen Brooks that the current, unranked system "allows the mediocre wines to profit from the reputation of Pomerol's best wines," and pointed to the results of the 2002 AOC label tasting panel, determining whether wines are allowed to bear the name AOC Pomerol on their wine label. Despite 2002 being a very difficult and sub-par vintage not a single wine failed to gain AOC approval.

However, despite the lack of an official ranking, many wine writers and critics have over the years came up with their own personal classifications that have been cited by other sources. In 2001, Master of Wine Clive Coates included a ranking of Pomerol estates in his book An Encyclopedia of the Wines and Domaines of France.

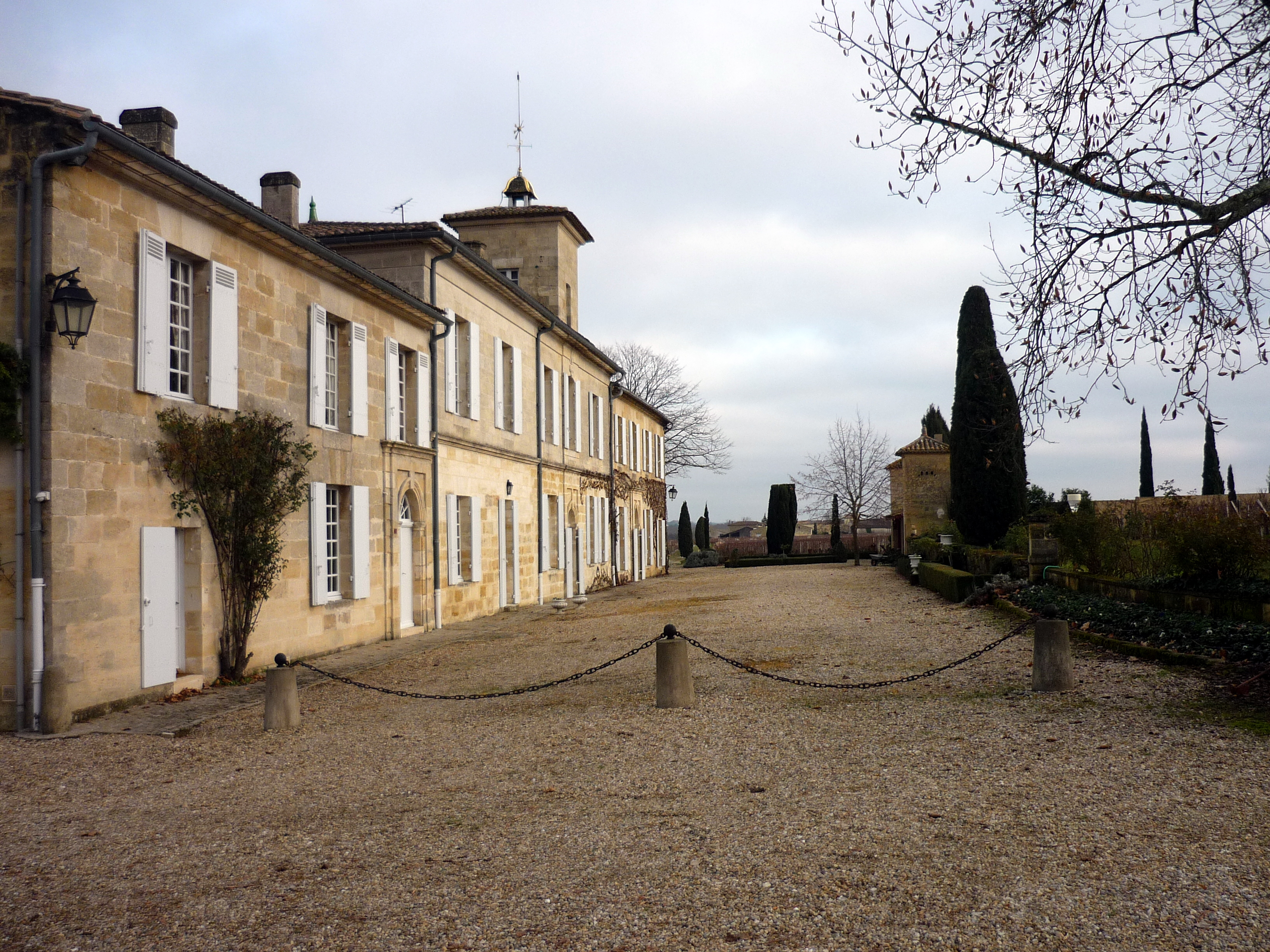
Château Gazin

- First Growth (On a par with First Growths of the Medoc and Premier Grand Cru Classé (A) estate of Château Cheval Blanc in Saint-Émilion) Château Pétrus
- Outstanding Growth (On a par with many Second and Third Growths of the Medoc) Château L'Évangile, Château La Fleur-Pétrus, Château Lafleur, Château Latour à Pomerol, Château Trotanoy, Vieux Château Certan.
- Exceptional Growth (On a par with many Second, Third and Fourth Growths of the Medoc) Château Le Pin, Château Certan de May, Château Clinet, Château La Conseillante, Château Clos l'Église, Château La Fleur-de-Gay and Château Gazin.
- Very Fine Growth (On a par with many Second, Third, Fourth and Fifth Growths of the Medoc) Château Beauregard, Château Bon-Pasteur, Château Hosanna, Clos du Clocher, Château la Croix-de-Gay, Château l'Enclos, Château le Gay, Château La Grave-à-Pomerol, Château Lagrange, Château Nenin, Château La Pointe, Château Taillefer and Château Clos-René.

== Food matching ==
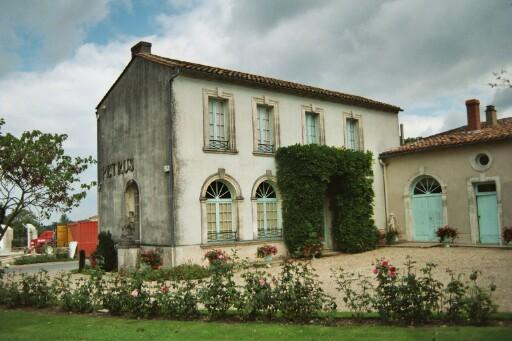
Château Pétrus

Wine writer Hugh Johnson has suggested that beef fillet or well hung venison is a good partner, particularly cooked in wine, but that Beef Wellington is to be avoided, as the pastry dulls the palate. Wine writer Oz Clarke has suggested that highly flavored game dishes, such as terrine and pâté can also be good, as they match up to the intensity of the wine.

== Tourism ==
Pomerol is well noted for the rural flavour that is a sharp contrast to the grand châteaux and ornate architecture that distinguishes many wine estates of the Medic. Many of the most distinguished estates are housed in what are often described as "simple farm houses". As much of Bordeaux, very few of the estates have tasting rooms and open to the public without appointment. This is because the bulk of Pomerol wine is sold en primeur, allocated to exclusive distributors and clients shortly after harvest, leaving little to no wine to be sold through the tasting room door.
