= Château Latour à Pomerol =

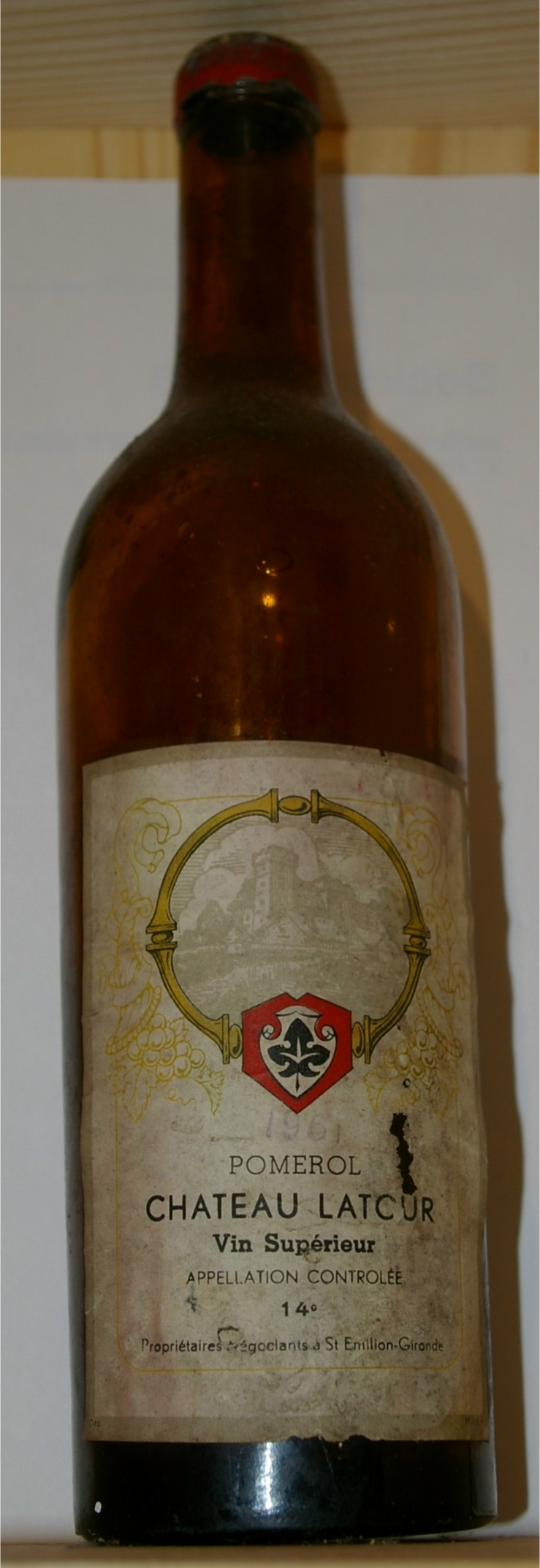
A bottle of Château Latour à Pomerol 1961.

Château Latour à Pomerol is a Bordeaux wine from the appellation Pomerol. The winery is located on the Right Bank of the Bordeaux wine region, in the commune of Pomerol in the department Gironde. As all wine produced in this appellation, Château Latour à Pomerol is unclassified, but is estimated among the great crus of the region.

== History ==
Originating from the estate of the Chambaud family in the 18th century, the sole heiress to the estate married Louis Garitey in 1875, who remained owners until Garitey's death in 1914 when the property was divided into three parts. The estate is first mentioned in the 1890 edition of Cocks & Féret where it was ranked among the best estates of Pomerol.

One part of the estate acquired in 1917 by Madame Edmond Loubat, she bought additions to the property with the estate named Haut-Canton-Guillot adjacent to Trotanoy and Clos des Grandes-Vignes near Pomerol's church, that together form the present Latour-à-Pomerol property.

Mme Loubat was also then proprietor of Château Pétrus, and the two properties have been closely associated since their reputation were established during and after World War II. The estate was inherited by her niece, Madame Lily Lacoste, in 1961, who remained the owner for 40 years before she donated the estate to the Fondation de Foyers de Charité de Châteauneuf de Galaure in 2002.

The estate was added to the properties farmed by Établissements Jean-Pierre Moueix in 1962.

== Production ==
The vineyards together extend 7.9 hectares (20 acres) with a grape variety distribution of 90% Merlot and 10% Cabernet Franc. The vineyard, with an average age of 35 years, is characterized by its soil diversity: rather loamy soil around the château itself and more gravelly and clayey on the best blocks near the church.

The annual production averages 3,000 cases (270 hl) of the Grand vin Château Latour à Pomerol, with no second wine made. (Grand vin has no legal definition, but generally indicates a vineyard's best offering.)
