= Château Mazeyres =

Bordeaux wine

Coordinates: 44.93257°N 0.23440°W

Château Mazeyres is a Bordeaux wine from the appellation Pomerol. The winery is located on the Right Bank of the Bordeaux wine region, in the commune of Pomerol in the department Gironde. As all wine produced in this appellation, Château Mazeyres is unclassified but the estate is estimated among the great growths of the region.

The estate also produces the second wine Le Seuil de Mazeyres.

== History ==
Château Mazeyres is located on a historic site, in a wooded park by the ruins of a Gallo-Roman villa destroyed in the 4th century. Early viticulture is demonstrated by the chai which was once a 16th-century convent, and the château constructed in the 19th century, during a period when the estate was one of the largest in Pomerol.

In 1988 Chateau Mazeyres was purchased by Caisse de Retraite de la Société Générale, and since 1992 has been managed by Alain Moueix, who also runs Château Fonroque. Alain Moueix began to introduce biodynamics since 2012 on the total property. The wines from Chateau Mazeyres are certified organics by Ecocert since the vintage 2015. They will be certified Biodynamics in 2018.

== Production ==
The vineyard area extends 25.57 hectares with the grape varieties of 73% Merlot and 24.4% Cabernet Franc 2.6% Petit Verdot the Grand vin Château Mazeyres there is an annual production of 5,000 cases, and of the second wine, Le Seuil de Mazeyres:ca. 1,600 cases.
