= Christian Moueix =

French winemaker

- Born: 1946 (age 79–80)
- Occupation: winemaker
- Known for: Owner, Dominus Estate
- Title: president, Établissements Jean-Pierre Moueix
- Spouse: Cherise Moueix
- Children: 2
- Parent: Jean-Pierre Moueix

Christian Moueix (French: [mu.ɛks]; born 1946) is a French winemaker and the president of the négociant house Établissements Jean-Pierre Moueix in Libourne, overseeing production in several estates in Saint-Émilion and Pomerol including Château La Fleur-Pétrus and Château Trotanoy. He has managed the company since his father Jean-Pierre Moueix stepped down in 1991.

== Early life ==
Christian Moueix was born in 1946, the son of Jean-Pierre Moueix.

== Career ==
Moueix also owns Dominus Estate in Napa Valley, California. Upon a recommendation by Robert Mondavi to establish production in Napa Valley, Moueix entered into a partnership with Robin Lail and Marcia Smith in 1982 on the historic Napanook Vineyards estate and became the sole owner of the property in 1995.

In 2008, Moueix was chosen the "Man of the Year" by the wine magazine Decanter.

== Personal life ==
Moueix is married to Cherise. He has two children from a previous marriage, Edouard, who has worked for JPM since about 2005, and Charlotte, a wildlife vet in South Africa.

== Art collectors ==
Moueix and his wife Cherise are well-known art collectors. In 2014, she sold Mark Rothko's No. 6 (Violet, Green and Red) to Yves Bouvier through an intermediary for $80 million plus an unspecified commission, which Bouvier then sold to Dmitry Rybolovlev for €140 million.

== See also ==
- List of wine personalities
