= Château L'Évangile =

Coordinates: 44.92568°N 0.19252°W

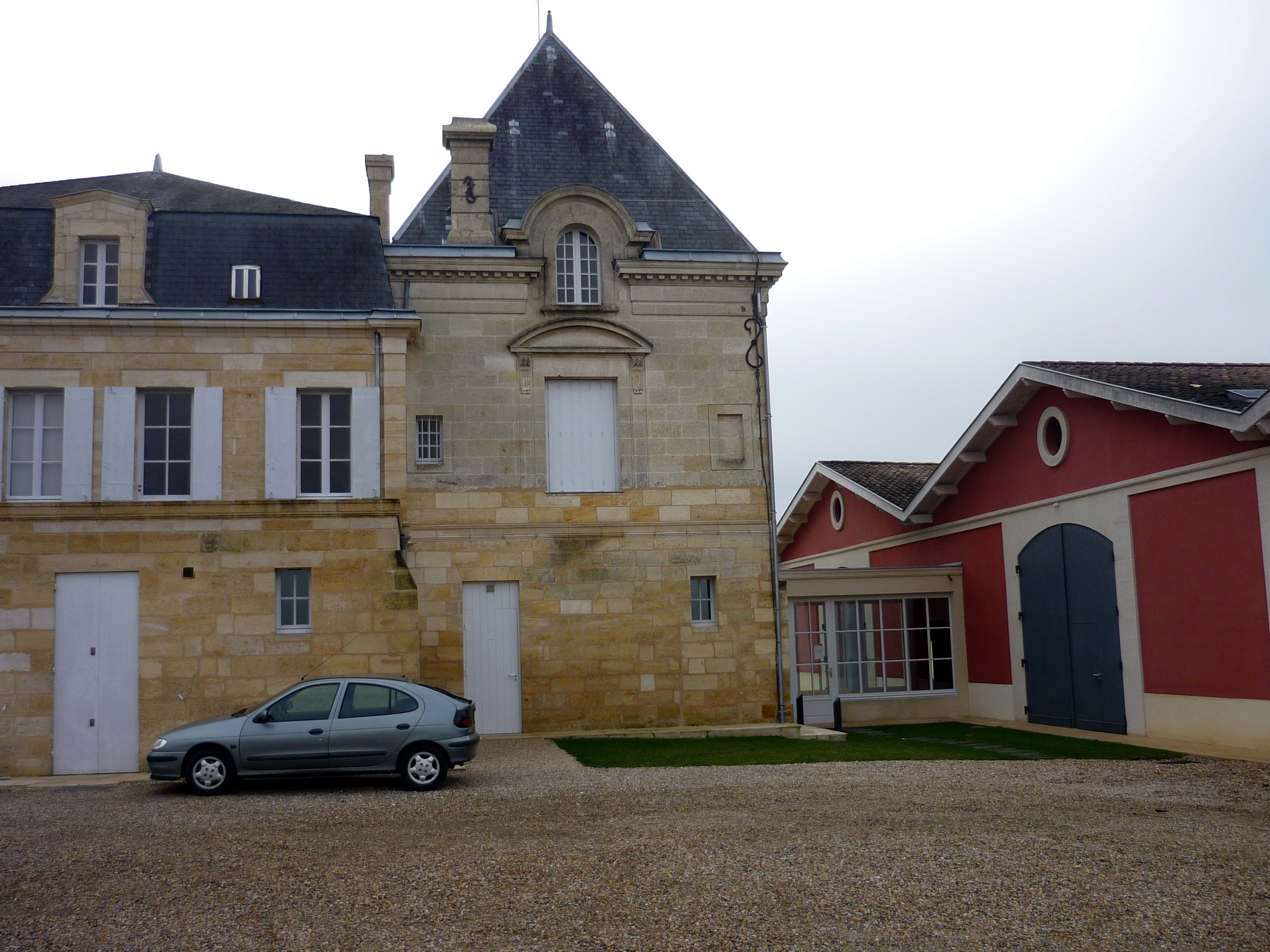
Exterior of the Chateau located outside near the border with Saint-Émilion

Château L'Évangile, archaically Fazilleau, is a Bordeaux wine estate from the appellation Pomerol. The winery is located on the Right Bank of the Bordeaux wine region, in the commune of Pomerol in the department Gironde. As all wine produced in this appellation, Château L'Évangile is unclassified, but the estate is estimated among the great growths of the region.

Placed on the eastern outskirts of Pomerol, the vineyard lies in a cluster with Vieux Château Certan, Château Pétrus, Château La Conseillante, near the border of Saint-Émilion and its nearest estate Château Cheval Blanc.

== History ==
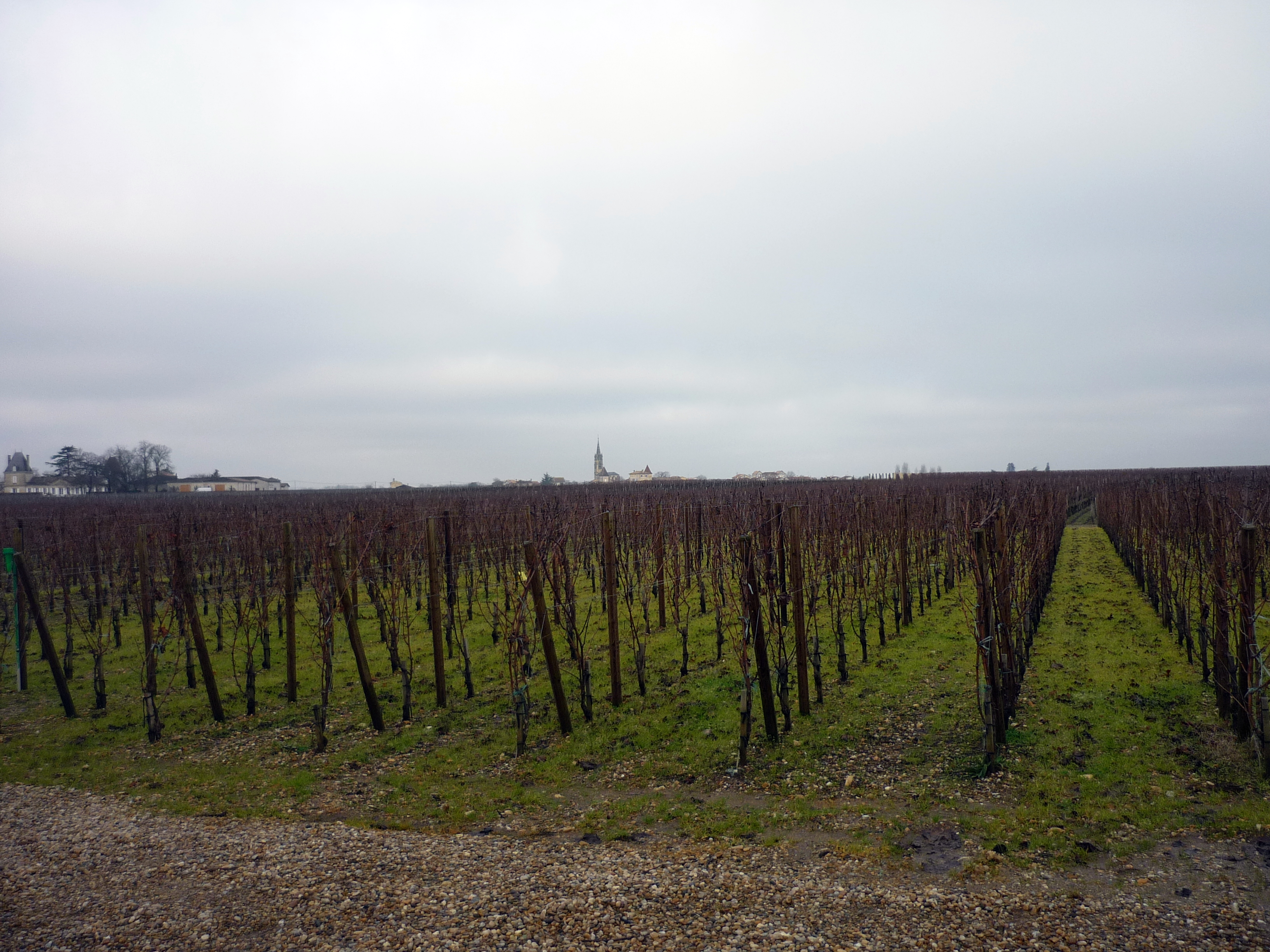
Vineyards of Château L'Évangile

L’Évangile appeared in the 1741 land registry under the name of Fazilleau, founded by the Libourne family Léglise. At the turn of the 19th century the property was sold to a lawyer named Isambert who gave the estate its present name, following the example set by Arnaud at neighbouring Pétrus.

In 1862, L’Évangile was purchased by Paul Chaperon, whose descendants, the Ducasse family remained the estate’s owners until 1990, when L’Évangile was acquired by Domaines Barons de Rothschild, the owners of Château Lafite Rothschild.

== Wine ==
Château L'Évangile has 80% Merlot and 20% Cabernet Franc. The aging in oak barrels is 18 months and 70% new oak barrels are used. The château also produces a second wine named Blason de L'Évangile (70 - 80% Merlot, 20 - 30% Cabernet Franc).

The average production of Château L'Evangile and the second wine Blason de L'Évangile is 5,000 cases of wine.
