= Château Lafleur =

Bordeaux winery in Pomerol, France

Château Lafleur (French pronunciation: [ʃato laflœʁ]) is a Bordeaux wine from the appellation Pomerol. The winery is located on the Right Bank of the Bordeaux wine region, in the commune of Pomerol in the department Gironde. As with all wine produced in this appellation, Château Lafleur is unclassified, but the estate is estimated among the great growths of the region. The wine is widely cited as one of the world's finest, rarest, and most expensive ones.

Since 1984 the estate has also produced a second wine named Les Pensées de Lafleur, which has been termed an "insider's secret".

== History ==
Located in the vicinity of Château Pétrus, this small estate shares history with the property across the road, Château Le Gay. Both part of the property Le Manoir de Gay in the mid 18th century, it was purchased by the Greloud family and divided among the sons into two properties, the Domain de Lafleur section eventually inherited by André Robin who imprinted on Lafleur his personal motto, "Qualité passe quantité" (French: Quality surpasses quantity).

In 1946 the sisters Marie and Thérèse Robin inherited both Lafleur and Le Gay, and ran both estates for nearly 40 years until Thérèse Robin's death. Allegedly reclusive characters, the sisters were uninterested in the growing fame of Lafleur, preferring to remain in the shadow of Château Pétrus. In 1981 the longstanding distributors of Lafleur the Libourne merchant Établissements Jean-Pierre Moueix handled management for Marie Robin.

Upon the death of Marie Robin in 2001, Jacques and Sylvie Guinaudeau took charge of the estate.

In 2025, Château Lafleur announced that it would cease producing wines under the Pomerol and Bordeaux appellations, reclassifying all six of its labels under the broader Vin de France designation. The estate cited the need to adapt viticultural and winemaking practices in response to climate change, noting that the regulatory framework of the established appellations had become too restrictive for the innovations it considered necessary. The move was widely regarded as a significant departure from tradition, given Lafleur's historic reputation within the Pomerol appellation.

== Production ==
The vineyard area consists of 4 hectares with the grape varieties of 60% Merlot and 40% Cabernet Franc.

The annual production averages 1,000 cases of the Grand vin Château Lafleur and approximately 750 cases of the second wine Les Pensées de Lafleur. Château Lafleur produces four other wines in the Fronsadais; Château Grand Village, Château Grand-Village, G Acte and Les Champs Libres.
