= Établissements Jean-Pierre Moueix =

Wine producer and distributor in Bordeaux, France

Établissements Jean-Pierre Moueix, or JP Moueix, is a Bordeaux négociant house founded by Jean-Pierre Moueix in 1937, situated on the Quai du Priourat in Libourne, in the Bordeaux wine region of France. While dealing in wholesale distribution of numerous Right Bank wines, the company also acts as a "négociant" for a large number of premium vineyards from Bordeaux and a selection of Italian, Australian, Spanish and German wines. It also operates exclusive distribution for select châteaux, and manages its own portfolio of Pomerol and Saint-Émilion estates. The company has 120 employees.

Since Jean-Pierre Moueix began investing in properties of the region in the early 1950s, the company grew to become highly influential in the French wine market, and was instrumental in the rise of the reputation of the Pomerol region. The early purchase of the Saint-Émilion estate Château Magdelaine in 1952 and the acquisitions of Pomerol La Fleur-Pétrus in 1950 and châteaux Trotanoy, Lagrange in 1953, while the gradual acquisition of Pétrus was begun in 1961, followed by the assuming the farming of Château Latour à Pomerol in 1962. In 1930 his father, Jean Moueix, had already bought the Saint-Émilion property, Château Fonroque. Later additions to the Moueix portfolio include the Napa valley property Dominus Estate, the Pomerol châteaux Hosanna and Providence, and complete ownership of the Saint-Émilion estate Château Belair then renamed Chateau Bélair-Monange.

Jean-Pierre Moueix retired in 1978 and died in 2003. In 1991 his son Christian Moueix became president of JP Moueix, while the grandson Edouard Moueix in the company since 2003 is today deputy general manager.

== Art collection ==
Prolific art collectors, the Moueix family sold the painting Triptych 1976 by Francis Bacon in April, 2008, originally purchased by Jean-Pierre Moueix in 1977. In an auction at Sotheby's New York the work was purchased for US$86.3 million by the Russian billionaire Roman Abramovich, recording the highest price paid for a postwar work of art.
