= Mas de Daumas Gassac =

Coordinates: 43.662°N 3.591°E

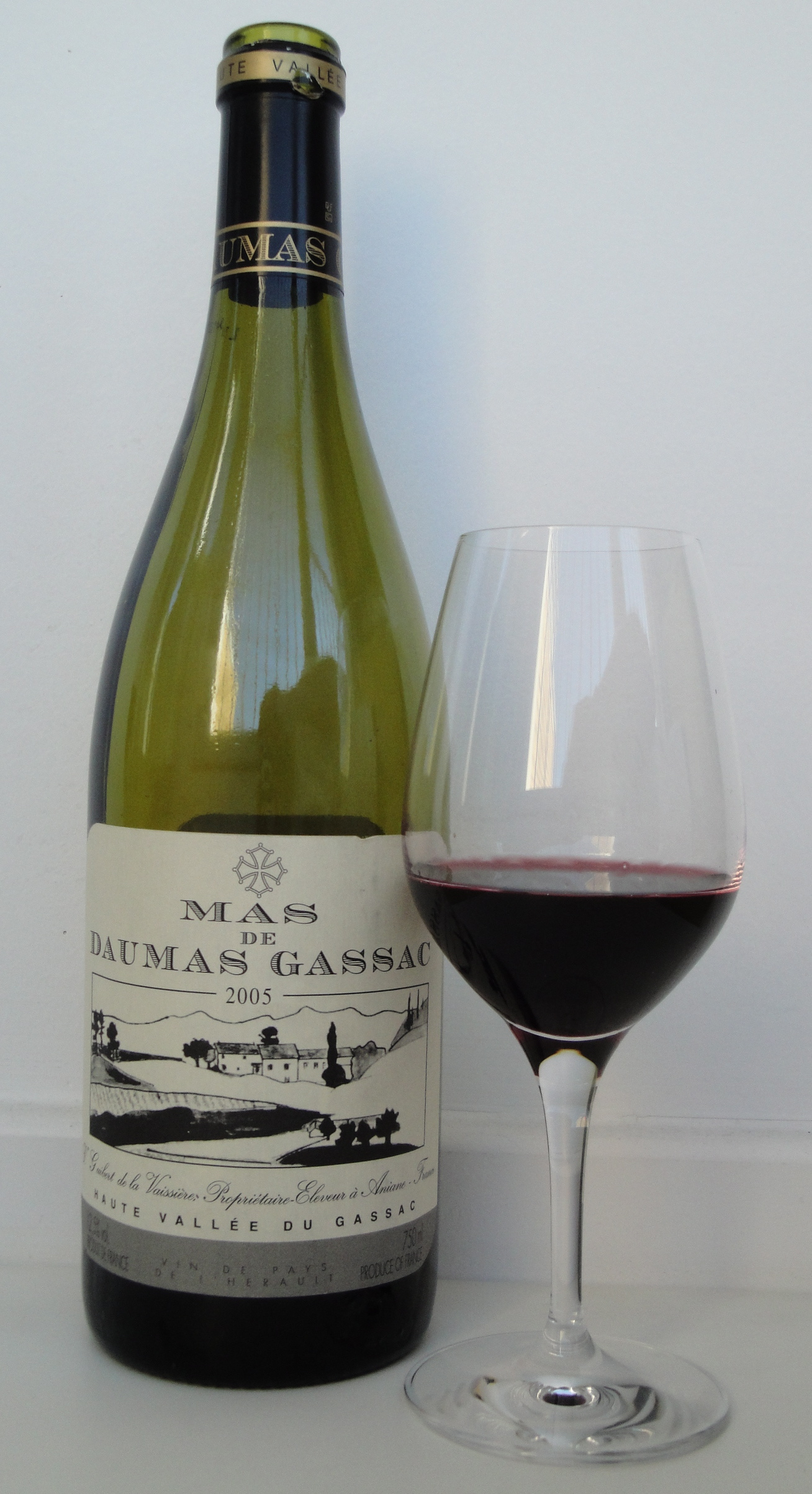
Mas de Daumas Gassac rouge

Mas de Daumas Gassac is a French wine producer from the wine region Languedoc, classified as Vin de Pays de l'Hérault due to its use of grape varieties outside specifications of its AOC. The winery, producing both white and red wine, is located in the south of France, in the commune of Aniane. Despite its modest designation and location, the vineyard has received widespread acknowledgement, described by The Times to taste like a "Latour" and by the French gastronomic guide GaultMillau as the "Lafite Rothschild of the Languedoc-Roussillon", it is frequently referred to as the Grand cru of the Languedoc.

== History ==
On land sold by the Daumas family to a former glove manufacturer, Aimé Guibert, wines were first planted at this vineyard in 1974. Following the recommendation of Henri Enjalbert, a professor of geography at the University of Bordeaux, whose assessment of the terroir determined the microclimate to be uncharacteristically favourable for cultivation of wine in such a warm region, the first vintage was produced in 1978 with the assistance of the oenologist Émile Peynaud.

Mas de Daumas Gassac came to be seen as the first to prove that a French non-appellation wine (as simply labelled Vin de Pays de l'Hérault) may be an extremely serious, long-living red wine able to fetch prices similar to a Bordeaux classed growth.

Aimé Guibert has since featured in the documentary film Mondovino, stating that "wine is dead".

== Moulin de Gassac ==
The estate also fronts a neighbouring cooperative label producing a wide range of products such as various blended and varietal wines, as well as spirits, balsamic vinegar, and an oil that is a blend of extra virgin olive oil and grape seed oil.

== Production ==
Over 50 hectares are cultivated in smaller plots dispersed throughout the estate, consisting predominantly of Cabernet Sauvignon, while other grape varieties include Merlot, Cabernet Franc, Pinot noir and Tannat, Nebbiolo, Barbera and Dolcetto. The white varieties are mostly Chardonnay, Viognier and Petit Manseng, but also Marsanne, Roussanne, Chenin blanc, Sercial and Muscat.

The red Grand vin Mas de Daumas Gassac has an annual production of 120,000 to 150,000 bottles. In addition, the estate produces a dry white Mas de Daumas Gassac Blanc (45,000 to 60,000 bottles), a Mas de Daumas Gassac Rosé Frizant (sparkling rosé - 8,000 to 12,000 bottles), and a cuvée exception named Émile Peynaud (2,000 bottles).
