= Château Certan de May =

Wine from the Bordeaux region of France

Château Certan de May, fully named Château Certan de May de Certan, is a Bordeaux wine from the appellation Pomerol. The winery is located on the Right Bank of the Bordeaux wine region, in the commune of Pomerol in the department Gironde. As all wine produced in this appellation, Château Certan de May is unclassified but the estate is long estimated among the great growths of the region.

== History ==
The estate's name has origins from the founding family, presumably of Scottish origin sometimes documented as Demay, who lived in France since the Middle Ages and were installed in Pomerol at the end of the 16th century. Archives state the family by royal ordonnance became masters of the fief of Certan, or Sertan, making this the oldest vignoble of the district, an area that also encompassed present day Vieux Château Certan and Château Certan-Giraud. The French Revolution led to the division of the domain, leaving the de May family with a small parcel of the original property, then called Petit-Certan.

After the death of the last de May in 1925 the estate came to the Barreau-Badar family, the present day owners. It is currently managed by Jean-Luc Barreau.

== Production ==
The vineyard area extends 5 hectares, with grape varieties of 70% Merlot, 25% Cabernet Franc and 5% Cabernet Sauvignon. Of the Grand vin there is typically produced 2,000 cases per year.
