= Château Nénin =

Pomerol winery

Château Nénin is a Bordeaux wine from the appellation Pomerol. The winery is located on the Right Bank of the Bordeaux wine region, in the commune of Pomerol in the department Gironde. As all wine produced in this appellation, Château Nenin is unclassified but the estate is estimated among the great growths of the region.

The estate also produces a second wine, Fugue de Nénin.

== History ==
Today one of the largest properties to be found on the southwestern slopes of the Pomerol, the Demay family are thought to have planted vines in the mid-18th century, although the development of the vineyards is attributed to the Paillet family in the mid-19th century.

The estate was owned by the Despujol family until 1997 when it was bought by the Delon family, proprietors of Château Léoville-Las Cases and Château Potensac. Consultancy is provided by the oenologist Michel Rolland.

== Production ==
The vineyard area extends 25 hectares, with grape varieties of 70% Merlot, 20% Cabernet Franc and 10% Cabernet Sauvignon.
