= Château Le Pin =

Bordeaux wine from the appellation Pomerol

Coordinates: 44.92583°N 0.20548°W

Château Le Pin, or simply Le Pin, is a Bordeaux wine from the appellation Pomerol. The unusually small estate is located on the Right Bank of France's Gironde estuary in the commune of Pomerol in the hamlet of Catusseau, and its wine is frequently one of the world's most expensive red wines.

== History ==
Madame Laubie, whose family had owned the plot since 1924 sold the one hectare vineyard in 1979 to the Belgian Jacques Thienpont for 1 million francs. The vineyards were developed by Jacques Thienpont whose family own the neighbouring Vieux Château Certan, and the wine was produced in tiny quantities from a farmhouse basement. The property was already called Le Pin from a solitary pine tree that grows near the winery. Today the estate comprises 2,7 hectares in one contiguous vineyard surrounding the winery. In 2011 a new winery, designed by the Belgian architectural practice Robbrecht en Daem architecten, was inaugurated using small stainless steel vats and gravity to move the wine.

Château Le Pin is considered by some a predecessor of the "garage wines", although this idea is rejected by many, including by the proprietors, on the basis of the merits of the terroir, and the absence of extreme measures to compensate for mediocre grapes.

Occasionally the most expensive wine in the world, continually receiving high wine ratings from wine critics and produced in extremely small numbers, Le Pin bottles are a constant presence on the wine auction market.

The winery is currently managed by Jacques Thienpont, and additional tiny plots of land have been acquired.

== Production ==
The vineyards extend over 5 acres (2.0 ha) of sandy gravel topsoil on a bedrock of limestone, with a grape variety of 100% Merlot the vines averaging 38 years of age. Typically 600 to 700 cases are produced per year, although in 2003 no wine was produced because of the drought and heatwave that year.
