= Jean-Pierre Moueix =

French Winemaker

- Born: 20 August 1913
- Died: 29 March 2003 (aged 89)
- Occupation: winemaker
- Title: founder, Établissements Jean-Pierre Moueix
- Children: 2, including Christian Moueix
- Parent: Jean Moueix

Jean-Pierre Moueix (20 August 1913 – 29 March 2003) was a French winemaker, the founder of Établissements Jean-Pierre Moueix.
