= Château La Conseillante =

Coordinates: 44.92411°N 0.19578°W

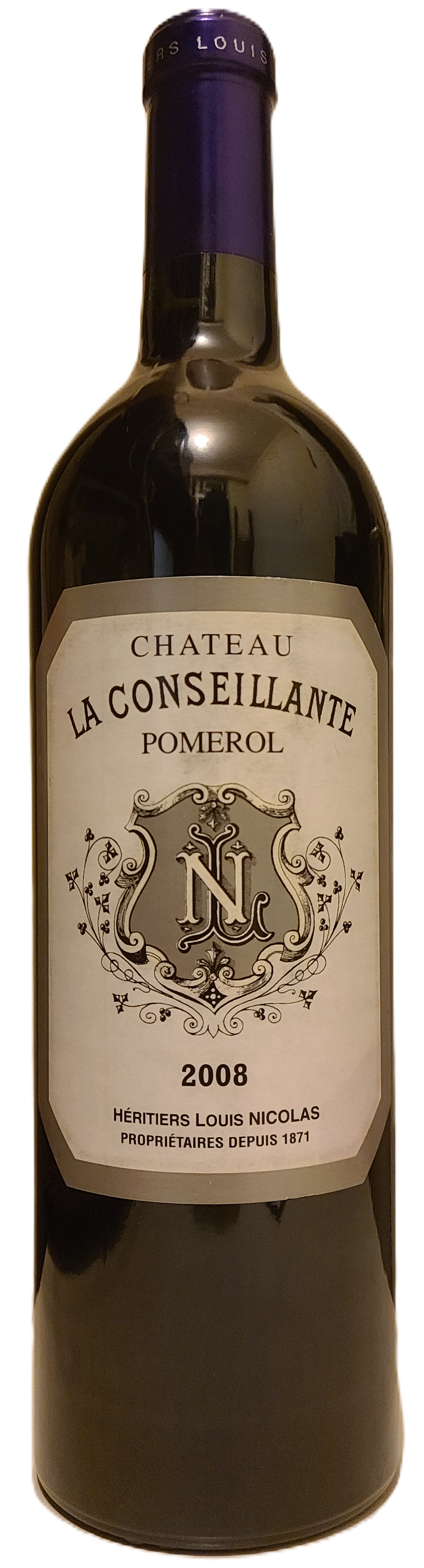
Grand Vin 2008

Château La Conseillante, previously Château Conseillante and simply La Conseillante, is a Bordeaux wine from the appellation Pomerol. The winery is located on the Right Bank of the Bordeaux wine region, in the commune of Pomerol in the department Gironde. As all wine produced in this appellation, La Conseillante is unclassified, but the estate is estimated among the great growths of the region.

Placed on the eastern outskirts of Pomerol, the estate sits between Château Petit-Village, Vieux Château Certan and Château L'Évangile to the west, and eastern adjacent Saint-Émilion neighbour Château Cheval Blanc.

The château also produces a second wine named Duo de Conseillante.

== History ==
The property, a métairie (English: small land holding) was inherited by Catherine Conseillan, a Libourne iron merchant, in 1734. In 1741, with an additional acquisition this was measured to be 23 hectares with less than 2 hectares under vine, but by 1754 she had joined the viticultural revolution like her neighbours Vieux Château Certan. By the time a modest house had been built to oversee the property, the estate had become known as "La Conseillante". Concerned that the estate would not become divided, she testamented it to a favorite niece, Marie Despujol.

The estate was acquired by Louis Nicolas in 1871, just before the Phylloxera blight, and once faced with devastation, he became one of the pioneers of carbon disulphide injections into the soil in 1878.

The estate remains the property of the Nicolas family to date.

== Production ==
The estate consists of 12 hectares with the grape variety of 80% Merlot and 20% Cabernet Franc. The annual production averages 4,000 cases of the Grand vin Château La Conseillante, and 1,000 cases of the second wine Duo de Conseillante.
