= Château Trotanoy =

Pomerol winery

Coordinates: 44.92938°N 0.20804°W

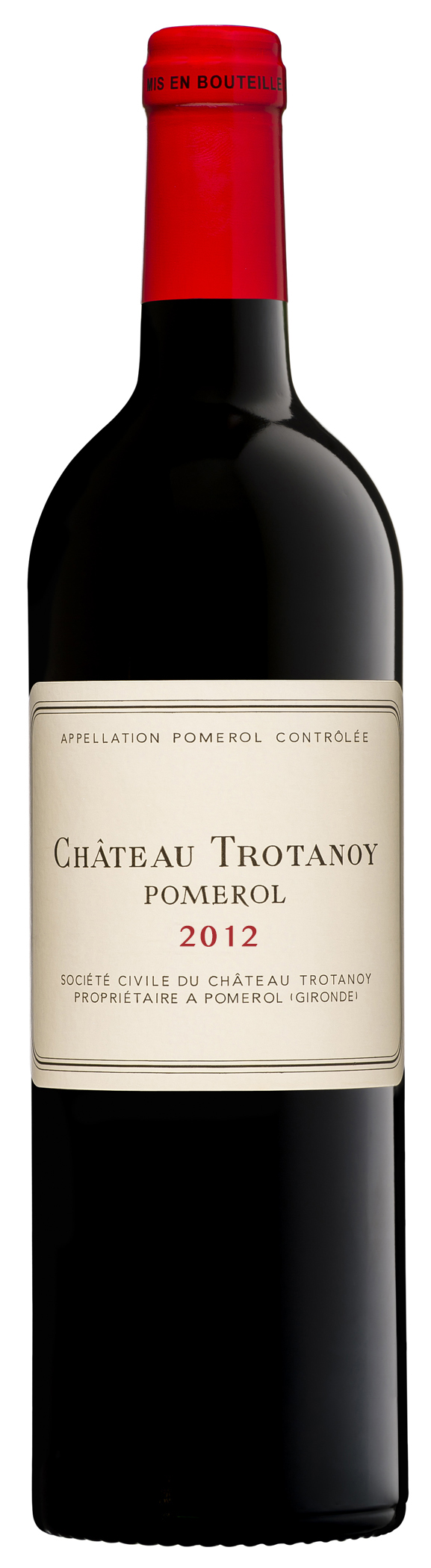

Château Trotanoy, archaically Trop Ennuie, is a Bordeaux wine from the appellation Pomerol. The winery is located on the Right Bank of the Bordeaux wine region, in the commune of Pomerol in the department Gironde. As all wine produced in this appellation, Château Trotanoy is unclassified, but the estate is estimated among the great growths of the region.

A second wine of Château Trotanoy, L’Esperance de Trotanoy, which made its debut with the 2009 vintage. 500 cases of L’Esperance de Trotanoy were produced. L’Esperance de Trotanoy is not made in every vintage.

== History ==
In the 18th century when owned by the pioneering Giraud family, the estate enjoyed a good reputation under the name Trop Ennuie, (too annoying in medieval French) a name indicating that cultivating the soil was difficult. In the early 20th century Jean-Jacques Moueix, nephew of Jean-Pierre Moueix, gave the estate its present name. It was purchased in 1953 by Ets. Jean-Pierre Moueix.

As Château Pétrus, Trotanoy is in the portfolio of Établissements Jean-Pierre Moueix, and its wine said to be made in a similar style to Pétrus.

== Production ==
The vineyard area extends 7.2 hectares with the grape varieties of 90% Merlot and 10% Cabernet Franc. The fascinating soil diversity - half gravel mixed with clay and half deep black clay - with the presence of “machefer” or iron pan in the subsoil, brings power and depth as well as complexity to the wine.

Château Trotanoy’s vineyard was one of the few not to freeze in 1956, and today it is composed of very old vines, the average being close to 35 years. As for other Ets. Jean-Pierre Moueix estates, the work done in the vineyard is fastidious - severe pruning in the winter, regular ploughing, crop-thinning, de-leafing, manicuring the clusters in the summer - and allows a perfect ripening of the fruit. The must is vinified in small concrete vats and the young wine matures in 50% new oak barrels for about 18 months.

When ready, this wine shows enormous complexity and concentration and belongs to the most sought-after Pomerols. It can easily be kept 25 years or more in great vintages.

The annual production averages 25,000 bottles of the Grand vin Château Trotanoy.
