= Château Pétrus =

Vineyard in Bordeaux, France

Coordinates: 44.93073°N 0.19285°W

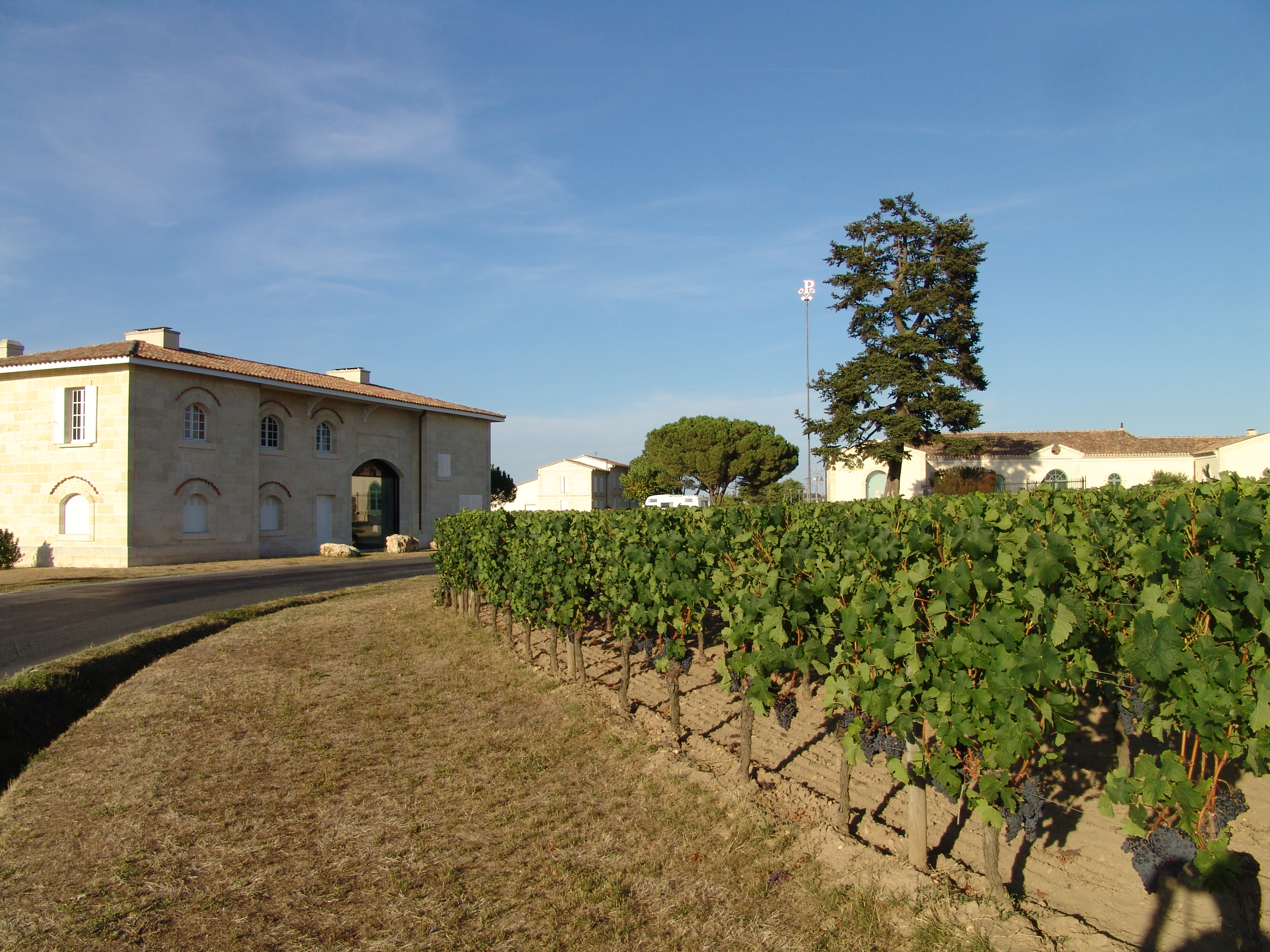
The main building of the Petrus estate

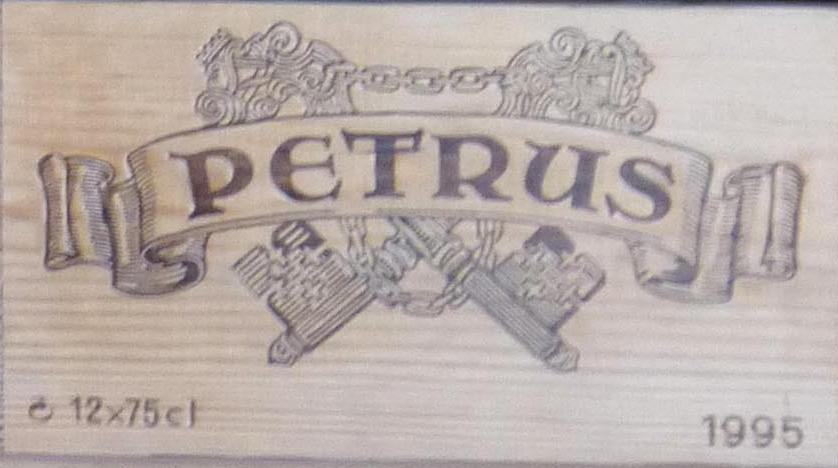
Close up of wooden wine crate used to ship bottles of Petrus

A bottle of Petrus 1982

Petrus (formerly known as Château Pétrus) is a Bordeaux, France, wine estate located in the Pomerol appellation near its eastern border to Saint-Émilion. A small estate of just 11.4 hectares (28 acres), it produces a red wine entirely from Merlot grapes (since the end of 2010), and produces no second wine. The estate belongs to Jean-François Moueix and his children.

Although the wines of Pomerol have never been classified, Petrus is widely regarded as the outstanding wine of the appellation. Petrus leads a duo of Pomerol estates in extreme prices, along with Le Pin, that rank consistently among the world's most expensive wines. A 750 ml bottle of Petrus wine is priced at an average of $4,112.

== History ==
1931 presentation card with the designs of the early 20th century, the label, cork, case and capsule markings

Originally, a 7-hectare (17-acre) vineyard, the estate had been owned by the Arnaud family since the end of the 18th century, and the name first appears in records from 1837. In the 1868 edition of Cocks & Féret, under listing Crus bourgeois et 1ers artisans, Petrus was ranked behind Vieux Château Certan and alongside Château Trotanoy. Some vintages of this period were labelled Petrus-Arnaud. At the Paris Exposition Universelle of 1878, Petrus won a gold medal, at a time when such an event had very significant results, establishing a selling price at the level of a Médoc second growth, the first wine of Pomerol to do so.

In 1917, the Arnaud family had to sell and La Société Civile du Château Pétrus, a share-holding company, was set up. Around 1925, the owner of the Hôtel Loubat in Libourne, the widow Mme. Edmond Loubat, began to buy shares in the estate and continued the acquisition progressively until 1945, when she became the sole owner of the domaine.

According to David Peppercorn, "the great age of Petrus" began with the end of World War II and the successful 1945 vintage. Jean-Pierre Moueix of the Libourne négociant house (Établissements Jean-Pierre Moueix) acquired exclusive selling rights of Petrus in that year, and the international reputation of Petrus began to grow. Mme. Loubat, who also owned Château Latour à Pomerol, remained an active vigneronne throughout her life, known for her meticulous dedication to detail and quality, and strong determination that her wine deserved to be priced equal to the great crus.

In the following years, the efficient partnership with Moueix became prosperous. Petrus was introduced to the United States. In 1947, Mme. Loubat presented two magnums of 1938 Petrus to the Lord Mayor of London, who had come to Pomerol for a visit, for the wedding of Princess Elizabeth.

After the 1956 winter frost that devastated the grapevines of the Bordeaux region and killed two-thirds of the Petrus vineyard, Mme. Loubat decided not to replant but to coppice (cut back severely) the vines on surviving rootstocks; this process of recépage had been previously untried in the region; her success ensured that the vines' average age remained high and established a tradition that has since been followed.

Petrus' fame in the U.S. grew in the 1960s, with the promotion by Henri Soulé, owner of the restaurant Le Pavillon in New York. According to Alexis Lichine, "[Petrus] was served at Le Pavillon in the days when Onassis sat at a corner table. After that, Petrus became a status symbol, the sort of name dropped by people who wish to imply not only that they know wine but that they are in wine".

On the death of Mme. Loubat in 1961, the estate was divided between a niece and nephew, Mme. Lily Lacoste-Loubat and M. Lignac, and a share was left to Jean-Pierre Moueix to break any deadlock between them and to ensure Moueix' continued influence. For a period, the estate was represented by the niece, but in 1964, Jean-Pierre Moueix bought the Lignac shares, and the oenologist Jean-Claude Berrouet became permanently attached to Petrus. Prior to this, Émile Peynaud had been employed as a part-time consultant. In 1969, 5 hectares (12 acres) of vineyard were added to the estate, purchased from neighbouring Château Gazin. increasing the surface area of Petrus from 7 to 11.4 hectares (28 acres).

Following the death of Jean-Pierre Moueix in 2003, his son Jean-François Moueix, head of Groupe Duclot, is the owner of Petrus; he and his children have controlled distribution worldwide via Clés Distribution since 2014. When Jean-Claude Berrouet retired as technical director after 45 vintages in 2008, he was replaced by his son Olivier Berrouet, who now manages the vineyard and the wine making.

In September 2018, Jean-François Moueix's entourage confirmed that 20 percent of the capital had been sold to Colombian-American billionaire Alejandro Santo Domingo.

== Terroir ==
The vineyard of Petrus covers 11.4 hectares (28 acres) and is located on a plateau in the eastern portion of Pomerol.

Located on top of a 20-hectare (49-acre) island mound, the Pétrus boutonnière or buttonhole, Petrus' original vineyard possesses topsoil and subsoil high in iron-rich clay that differs from neighbouring vineyards, where the soil is a mixture of gravel-sand or clay-sand.

The estate was among the first in Bordeaux to implement green-harvesting or éclaircissage as a way to lower crop yields and raise the quality of the remaining grapes.

== Grape varieties ==
The grape variety distribution is 100% Merlot since the end of 2010. The average age of the vines exceeds 45 years. This grape variety is made up of black, medium round berries. The administration of the estate takes particular care to maximize the quality of the harvest.

== Production ==
Petrus produces an average of 30,000 bottles per year. The grapes are hand harvested over two to three days. The wine is aged between 12 and 16 months in oak barrels, half of which are new, before bottling. A stringent pre-assemblage vat selection is carried out and certain parcels are rejected from the Grand Vin.

== Description ==
The wine is characterized by great elegance, a complex and powerful nose and a particularly opulent fruit. The guide to Bettana and Desseauve wines (2016) describes Petrus as follows: "With its refined and deep tension and the right density, its taffeta texture and floral returns, Petrus is a wine that shines and gradually imposes itself on you."

== Vintages ==
The best vintages are generally recognized as 1929, 1945, 1947, 1961, 1964, 1982, 1989, 1990, 2000, 2005, 2009, and 2010. In 1956, 1965, and 1991, the harvests did not produce a wine of sufficient quality and these vintages do not exist. The years 1963, 1968, 1977, or 1984 exist in very small quantities for the same reason. The vintages 1921, 1929, 1947, 1961, 1989, 1990, 2000, 2009, and 2010 all received a score of 100/100 from critic Robert Parker.

== Cost ==
The price of a bottle varies from 1,000 euros for a "small" vintage to more than 2,500 euros for a great vintage, or even 6,000 euros for an exceptional vintage such as 1947 or 1961. According to the Wine-searcher site, Petrus is the sixth most expensive wine in the world, after five Burgundy wines, and an average price of US$625,000 (about €600,000) for all vintages and countries combined.

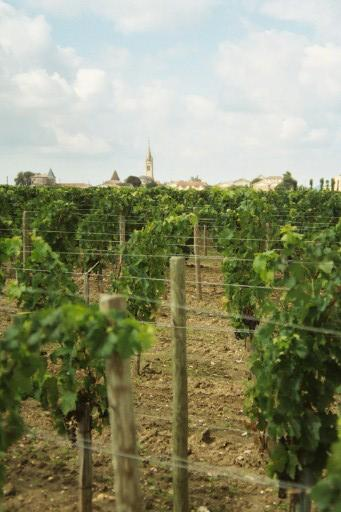
Petrus vineyards

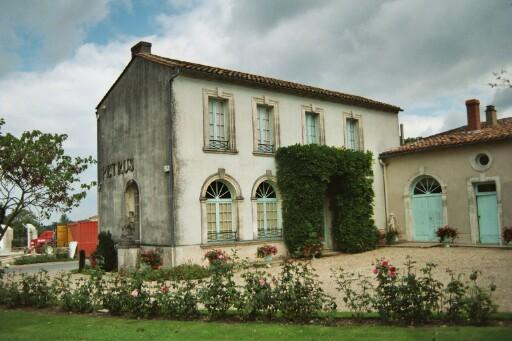
The Petrus country house
