= Pomerol =

- Commune
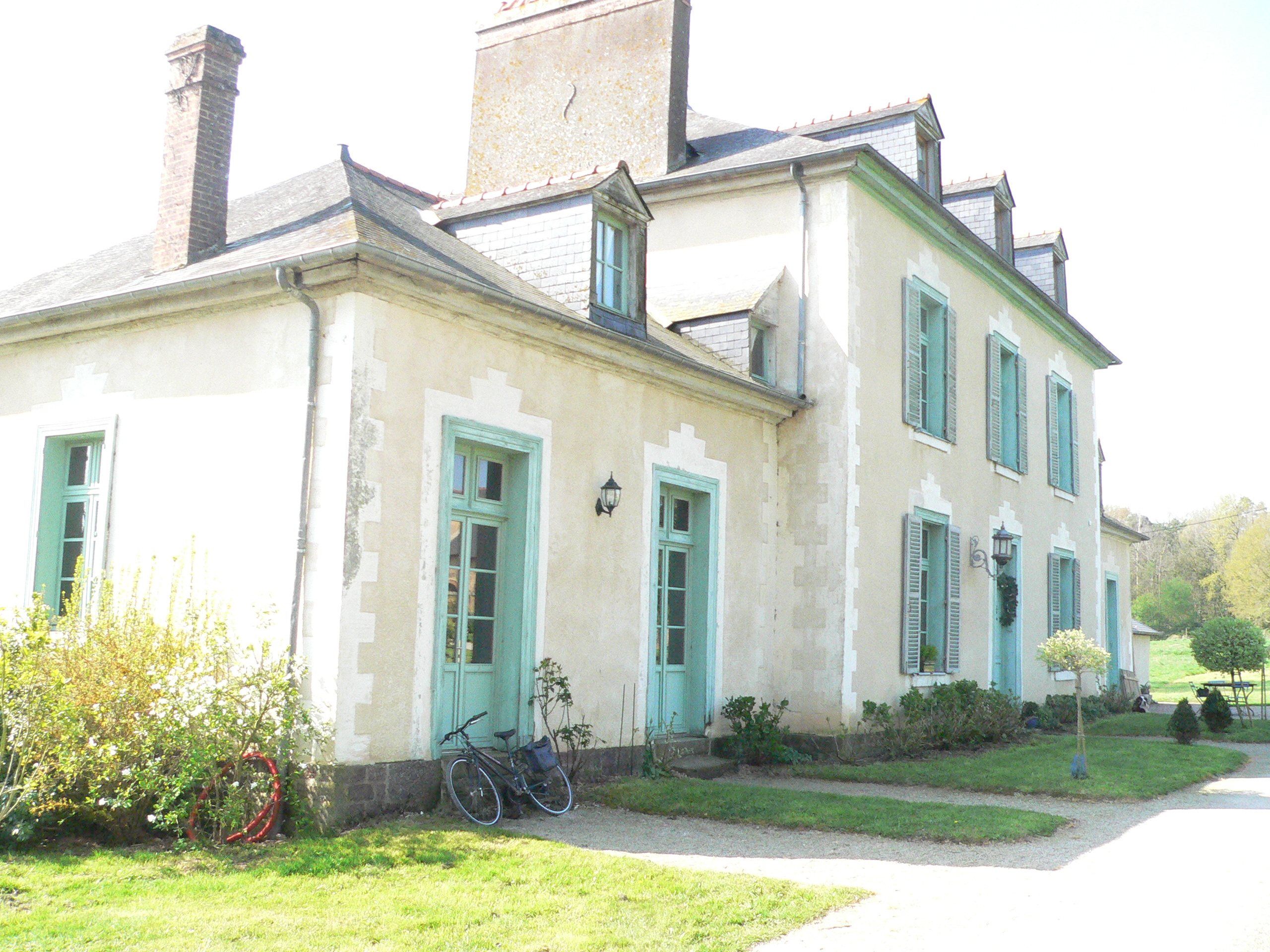
- Chateau Le Pin

- Coat of arms
- Location of Pomerol
- Location within France Location within Nouvelle-Aquitaine
- Coordinates: 44°55′58″N 0°11′57″W
- Country: France
- Region: Nouvelle-Aquitaine
- Department: Gironde
- Arrondissement: Libourne
- Canton: Le Libournais-Fronsadais
- Intercommunality: CA Libournais

Government
  - Mayor (2020–2026): Jean-Luc Barbeyron
- Area^{1}: 6.24 km^{2} (2.41 sq mi)
- Elevation: 30 m (98 ft)
- Highest elevation: 39 m (128 ft)
- Lowest elevation: 7 m (23 ft)
- Population (2023): 608
  - Density: 97.4/km^{2} (252/sq mi)
- Time zone: UTC+01:00 (CET)
  - Summer (DST): UTC+02:00 (CEST)
- INSEE/Postal code: 33328 /33500
- ^{1} French Land Register data, which excludes lakes, ponds, glaciers > 1 km^{2} (0.386 sq mi or 247 acres) and river estuaries.

Pomerol (French pronunciation: [pɔmʁɔl]; Occitan: Pomairòus) is a commune in the Gironde department in Nouvelle-Aquitaine near Bordeaux in southwestern France.

== Wine ==
With only 800 hectares (2,000 acres), Pomerol is the smallest wine producing area in the Bordeaux region. It is more a community where the vineyards are family-shared. The mostly small-sized producers in the area produce red wines. As in the neighbouring appellation of Saint-Émilion, the predominant grape variety is Merlot, often with Cabernet Franc and smaller quantities of Cabernet Sauvignon. Unlike other Bordeaux regions, Pomerol has no official wine ranking or classification. However, wines like Château Pétrus and Château Le Pin are priced as high as the classified first growths of the Pauillac and Saint-Émilion such as Château Ausone and Château Cheval Blanc.

The next-door and slightly larger "satellite" appellation of Lalande-de-Pomerol produces similar wines which are shorter-lived and less expensive.

== Population ==
Historical population
Year	Pop.	±% p.a.
1968	1,116	—
1975	1,037	−1.04%
1982	962	−1.07%
1990	867	−1.29%
1999	848	−0.25%
2007	743	−1.64%
2012	704	−1.07%
2017	607	−2.92%
2023	608	+0.03%
Source: INSEE

== See also ==
- French wine
- Bordeaux wine
- Plan Bordeaux
- Communes of the Gironde department
