= Vieux Château Certan =

Coordinates: 44.92774°N 0.19789°W

- Location: France
- Wine region: Bordeaux wine region

Vieux Château Certan is a Bordeaux wine from the appellation Pomerol. The winery is located on the Right Bank of the Bordeaux wine region, in the commune of Pomerol in the department Gironde. As all wine produced in this appellation, Vieux Château Certan is unclassified, but the estate is long recognised as among the great growths of the region, and by some reckoned comparable to neighbouring estate Château Pétrus.

The château also produces a second wine named Gravette de Certan.

== History ==
Although the estate's origins are uncertain, its age has been estimated by professor Henri Enjalbert to an origin date around 1770. It was then the property of the Demay family, and the estate was named Sertan. Long estimated as the leading estate of the region, it yielded the position to the adjacent Pétrus in 1875.

The estate was bought by the Belgian wine merchant Georges Thienpont in 1924, and it has remained within the family since. The family diversified in 1979 when Marcel and Gérard Thienpont founded nearby microcuvée estate Château Le Pin. In 1985, management of Vieux Château Certan came to Alexandre Thienpont.

== Production ==
The estate consists of 14 hectares with the grape variety of 60% Merlot, 30% Cabernet Franc and 10% Cabernet Sauvignon. The annual production averages 5,000 cases of the Grand vin.
