= Regional Bordeaux AOCs =

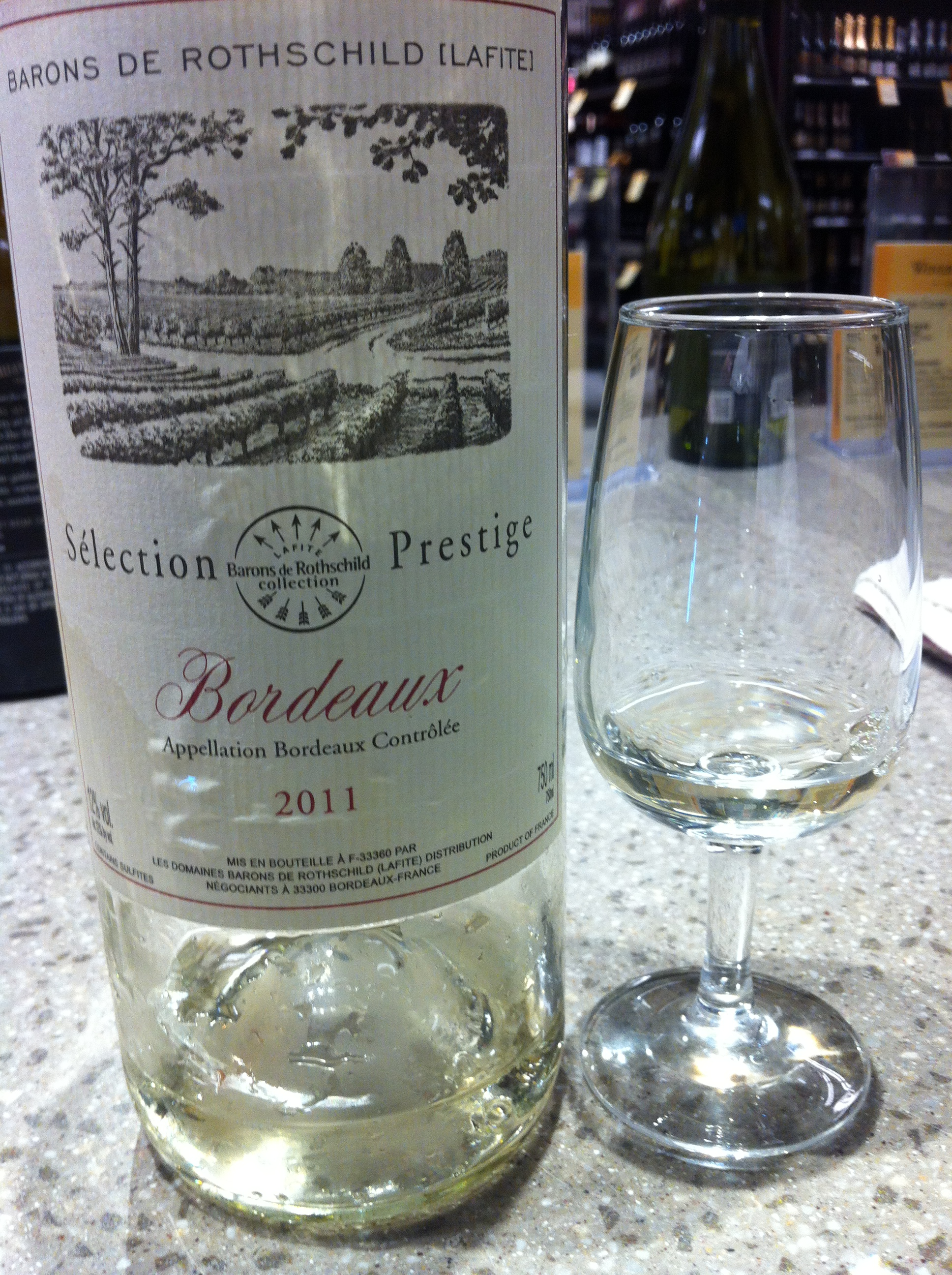
A dry white Bordeaux

In the Bordeaux wine region there are seven regional Appellations d'origine contrôlée (AOCs) that may be used throughout the Gironde department. These are Bordeaux Rouge AOC, Bordeaux Supérieur Rouge, Bordeaux Clairet, Bordeaux Rosé, Bordeaux Blanc, a dry white, Bordeaux Supérieur Blanc, a sweet white, and Crémant de Bordeaux, a sparkling méthode traditionnelle wine. The regional appellations together form the largest world-class wine vineyard, making up more than half of the production of the prestigious Bordeaux wine region, and representing more than 55% of all Bordeaux wines consumed in the world.

== Bordeaux AOC ==
=== Wine style ===
The entry-level Bordeaux AOC reds are fruity and easy-to-drink, and meant for early consumption rather than cellaring. More ambitious reds are usually sold as Bordeaux Supérieur AOC.

Notable exceptions to the general rule of Bordeaux AOC as simpler wines are some dry white wines produced in Médoc and Sauternes, where the production of red and sweet wines dominate. In difference from most of Graves, these areas are not allowed to use any other designation than Bordeaux Blanc AOC for dry white wines. Thus, some very ambitious and expensive dry white wines, such as Château Margaux's Pavillon Blanc and Château d'Yquem's "Y" have to be classified as "simple" Bordeaux Blancs.

All rosé and clairet wines are produced under regional appellations.

=== Production and area ===
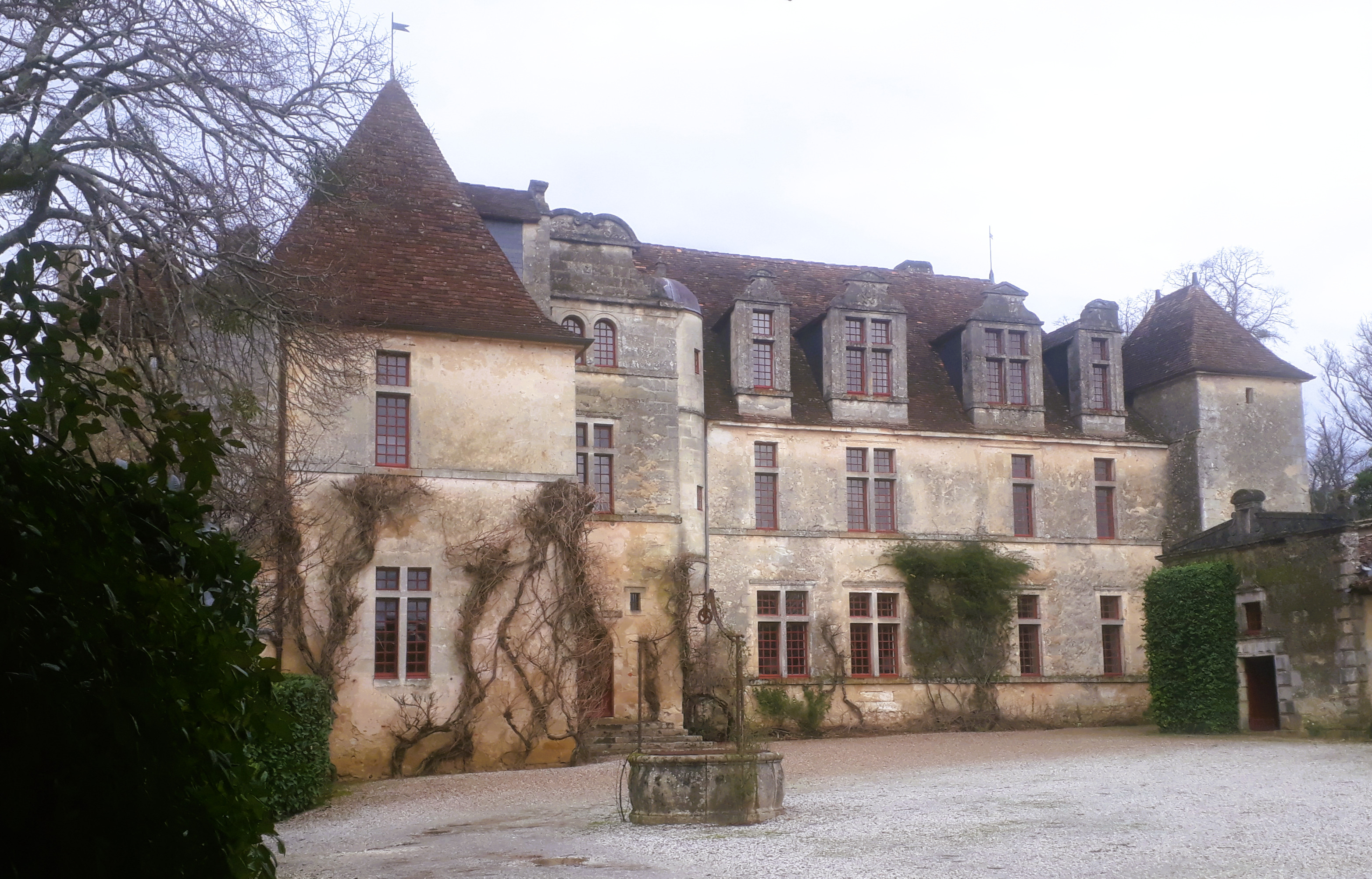
Château Le Grand Verdus, in Sadirac, Entre-deux-Mers

The vineyard area devoted to the production of Bordeaux AOC wines is approximately 61,700 hectares (152,000 acres), of which 50,000 hectares (120,000 acres) are used for red wine and 6,740 hectares (16,700 acres) for white wine.

Average yearly production is 3,300,000 hectolitres, corresponding to approximately 431 million 75 cl bottles, with 2,300,100 hectolitres of red wine and 304,000 hectolitres of white wine.

The maximal authorized yield for Bordeaux AOC is 55 hectoliter per hectare, and the alcohol level of the wine must be between 10 and 13 volume percent. Dry white Bordeaux may not have more than 4 grams per litre of residual sugar.

=== Grape varieties ===
For red wines, the most planted grape varietals are Merlot and Cabernet Sauvignon. As most regional Bordeaux AOC wines are produced on the Right Bank, Cabernet Franc is often found in the blend. Winemakers are using more and more Malbec, but Petit Verdot is not often seen.

For white wines, Sauvignon blanc and Sémillon each represent 42% of the vineyard surface and Muscadelle 9%.

== Bordeaux Supérieur Rouge AOC ==
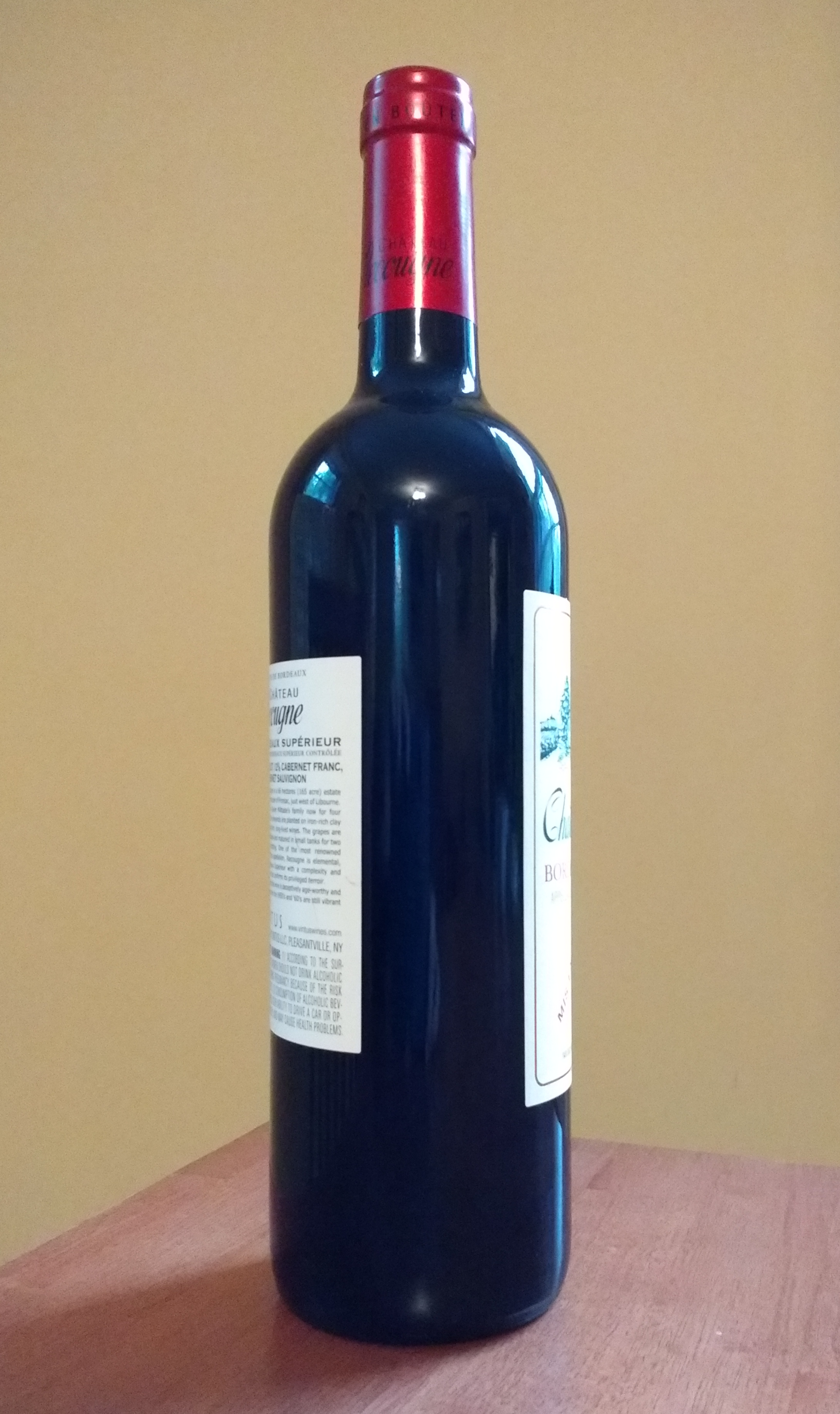
A bottle of Bordeaux Supérieur red wine

The Bordeaux Supérieur appellation covers the same geographic area as Bordeaux AOC. However, the wine in this appellation is often produced by single parcels of older vines. Moreover, Bordeaux Supérieur wines must be aged for at least nine months before they can be sold.

Just like regular Bordeaux these are blends, with the reds being predominantly Cabernet Sauvignon and Merlot with smaller amounts of Cabernet Franc, Petit Verdot, Malbec and even some Carmenere, such as at Château Damase. For the white wines, Sauvignon Blanc and Semillon are favored with smaller amounts of Muscadelle, Ugni Blanc, and Sauvignon Gris.

Under the strict guidelines of French appellation law for a Bordeaux to be classified as Supérieur it must come from a vineyard that is planted more densely. There must be 4,500 plants per hectare with a distance of 2.2 meters between rows, compared to 4,000 plants per hectare with a distance of 2.5 meters between rows for regular Bordeaux. This higher density makes it harder for the plants to survive creating stronger deeper roots, and healthier vines for the ones that do.

The regulations also stipulate a lower yield, about 10 percent lower per hectare, which allows each vine to maximize the nutrients received by the grapes that have not been pruned. The grapes must also be picked riper at harvest with higher natural sugar levels resulting in 10 percent natural alcohol level -- a slight bit higher than the 9.5 percent for regular Bordeaux.

Bordeaux Supérieur can be found anywhere in Bordeaux, but is biased towards the area north of Saint-Émilion and Pomerol. The result of these differences usually creates a superior wine with a richer and more complex flavor.

=== Production and surface ===
Yearly production: 489,230 hectolitres

Surface : 4,725 hectares (47.25 km^{2})

== Bordeaux Clairet AOC ==
Bordeaux clairet is a generic AOC for the Bordeaux defined as clairet. All other appellations in the Bordeaux region, including the most prestigious ones, are entitled to produce under this AOC. Bordeaux clairet is a wine which can either be described as a dark rosé wine or a light-coloured red wine. As there is also a more commonly used Bordeaux rosé designation, Bordeaux clairet is not simply any rosé from Bordeaux.

Bordeaux clairet wines are light, and similar in colour to the wines which were shipped from Bordeaux to England during the Middle Ages, known as French Claret. These wines established the fame of Bordeaux as a wine-making region, and led to the (primarily English) practice of referring to Bordeaux as "claret".

=== Production and surface ===
Yearly production is 52,000 hectolitres from 925 hectares of vineyard surface. Maximum authorized yield is 55 hectolitres per hectare.

=== Grape varieties ===
The authorized grape varieties are the same as red Bordeaux AOC although Merlot is the most common of this AOC.

== Summary of characteristics ==
Production requirements and statistics for the various regional AOCs are as follows:

AOC	Bordeaux (red)	Bordeaux Clairet	Bordeaux Rosé	Bordeaux Supérieur (red)	Bordeaux (white)	Bordeaux Sec	Bordeaux Supérieur (white)
AOC requirements
Allowed grape varieties	Cabernet Sauvignon, Cabernet Franc, Carmenère, Merlot rouge, Malbec, Petit Verdot				Principal grape varieties (min 70%): Sémillon, Sauvignon blanc, Sauvignon gris, Muscadelle; Accessory grape varieties (max 30%): Merlot blanc, Colombard, Mauzac, Ondenc, Ugni blanc		Principal grape varieties (min 70%): Sémillon, Sauvignon (blanc and gris), Muscadelle; Accessory grape varieties (max 30%): Merlot blanc (max 15%), Colombard, Mauzac, Ondenc, Ugni blanc
Specific colour requirement (if applicable)		lightly coloured red	rosé				
Grape ripeness (in terms of minimum sugar content)	178 g/L		187 g/L	178 g/L		170 g/L	212 g/L
Alcohol content after fermentation	min 10%		min 11%	min 10.5%	min 10.5% (potential) min 10% (actual)	min 10% max 13%	min 12.5% (potential) max 15% (potential) min 11.5% (actual)
Residual sugar (if applicable)					min 4 g/L	max 4 g/L	
Base yield	55 hl/ha			50 hl/ha	65 hl/ha		50 hl/ha
Minimum planting density	2,000 vines per ha						
Maximum number of buds kept after pruning	60,000 per ha						
Maturation requirement (if applicable), earliest sale date				1 July the year after harvest			1 July the year after harvest
Production statistics
Vineyard surface	44,000 ha	925 ha	3,300 ha	10,000 ha	6,740 ha		
Average annual production	2,500,000 hl	52,000 hl	180,000 hl	530,000 hl	420,000 hl		

== See also ==
- List of Vins de Primeur
- Bordeaux wine
