= Château de Tustal =

Castle in France

Coordinates: 44.7853°N 0.3887°W

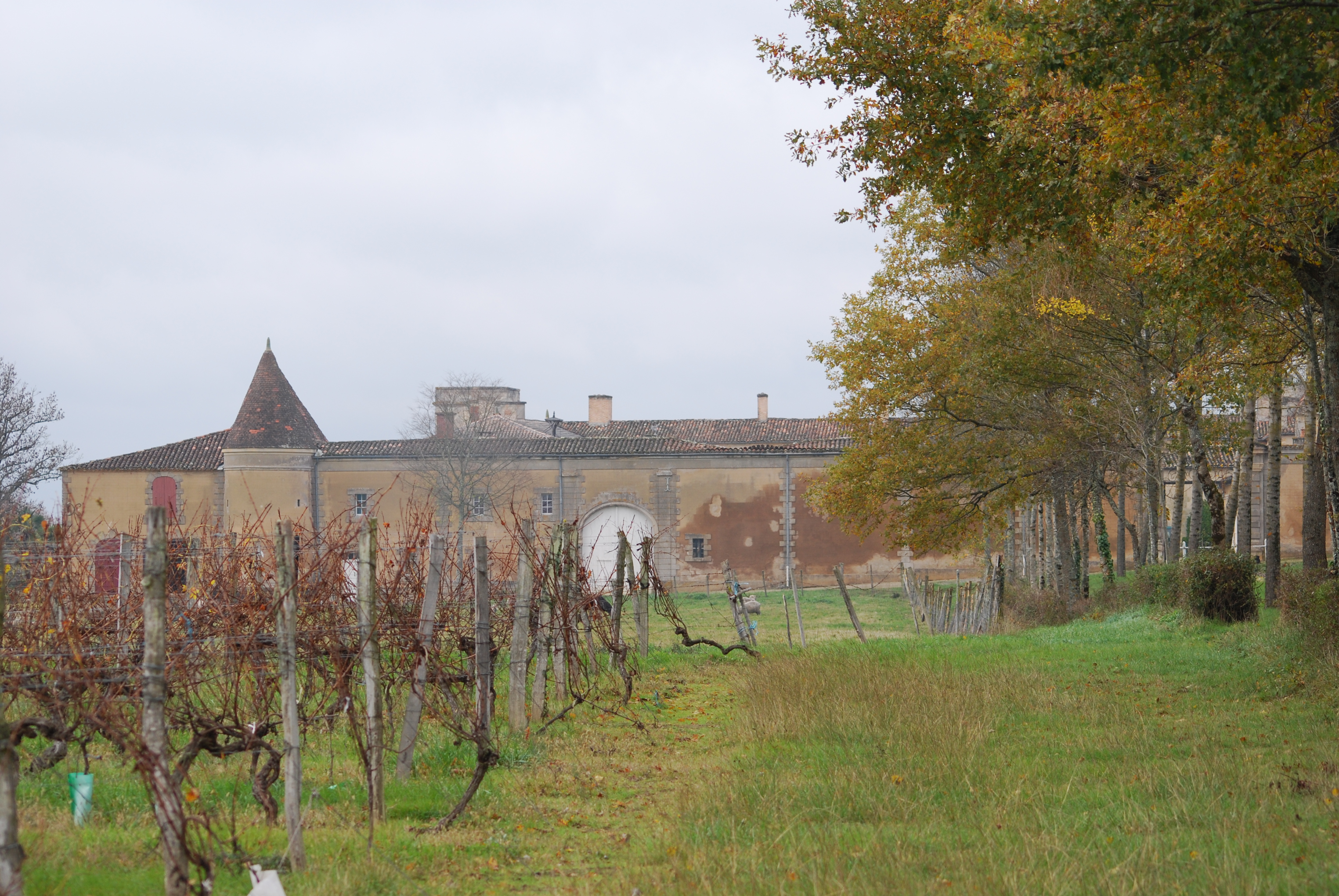
- Château de Tustal in 2012
- Interactive map of the Château de Tustal area

The Château de Tustal is an historic castle in Sadirac, Gironde, Aquitaine, France.

== History ==
The castle was built in 1614, with additional constructions added in the 18th and 19th centuries.

== Architectural significance ==
It has been listed as an official monument since 2008.
