= Clairet =

Type of French wine

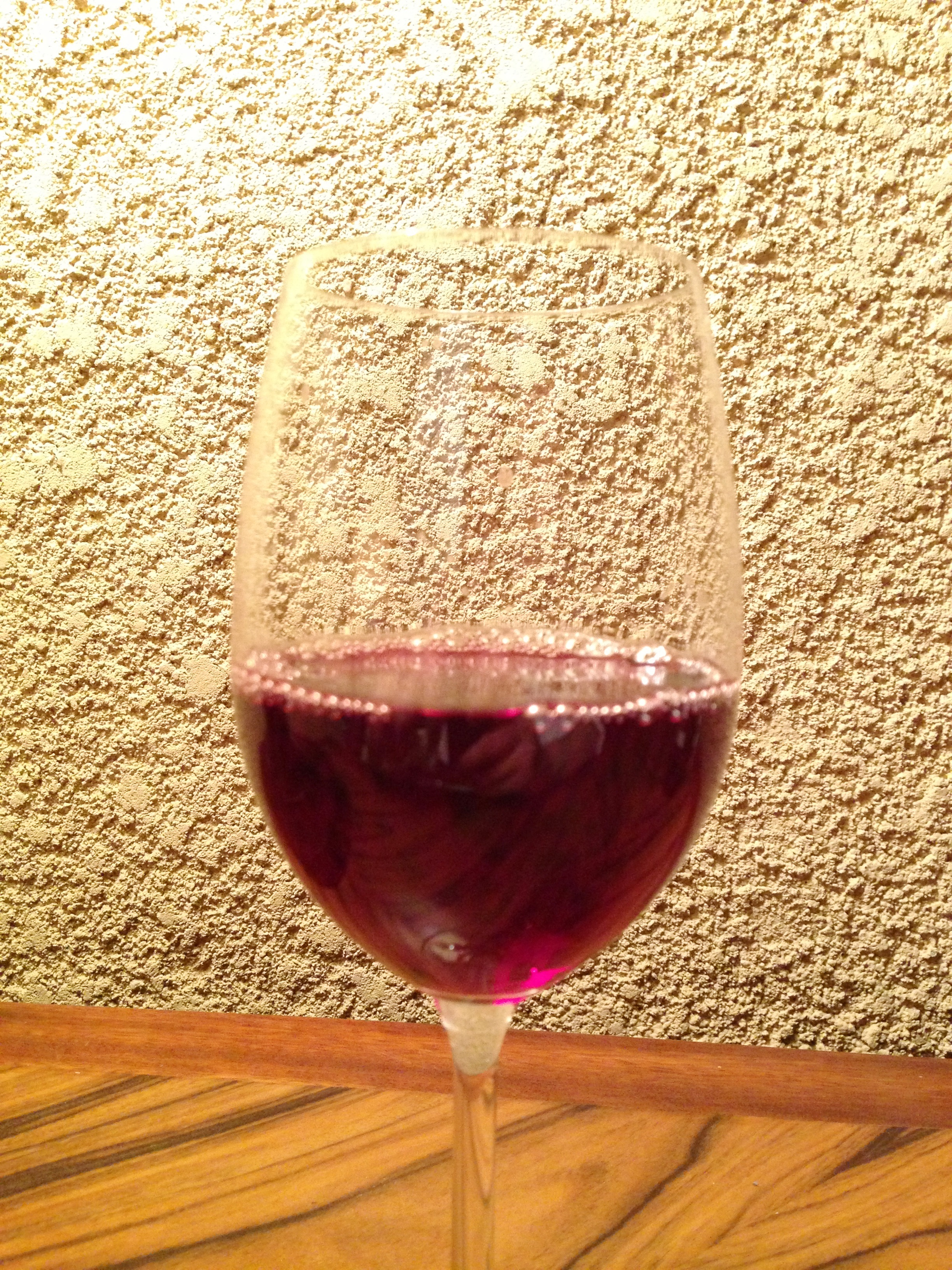
A glass of Clairet

Clairet (French: [klɛ.ʁɛ]) is a wine that is dark pink in style and may be described as a full-bodied and deep-coloured type of rosé. It is considered a specialty of the Bordeaux region and is thought to have originated in Quinsac in Premieres Côtes de Bordeaux. Similar to the light wine of the Middle Ages that was exported to England, also called "vinum clarum" and "vin clar" or "bin clar", the name is the source of the English term claret, although that term does not refer to a clairet but to a red wine.

The wine is bottled under the AOC of Bordeaux clairet.
