= Château Le Grand Verdus =

Manor house and wine estate in France

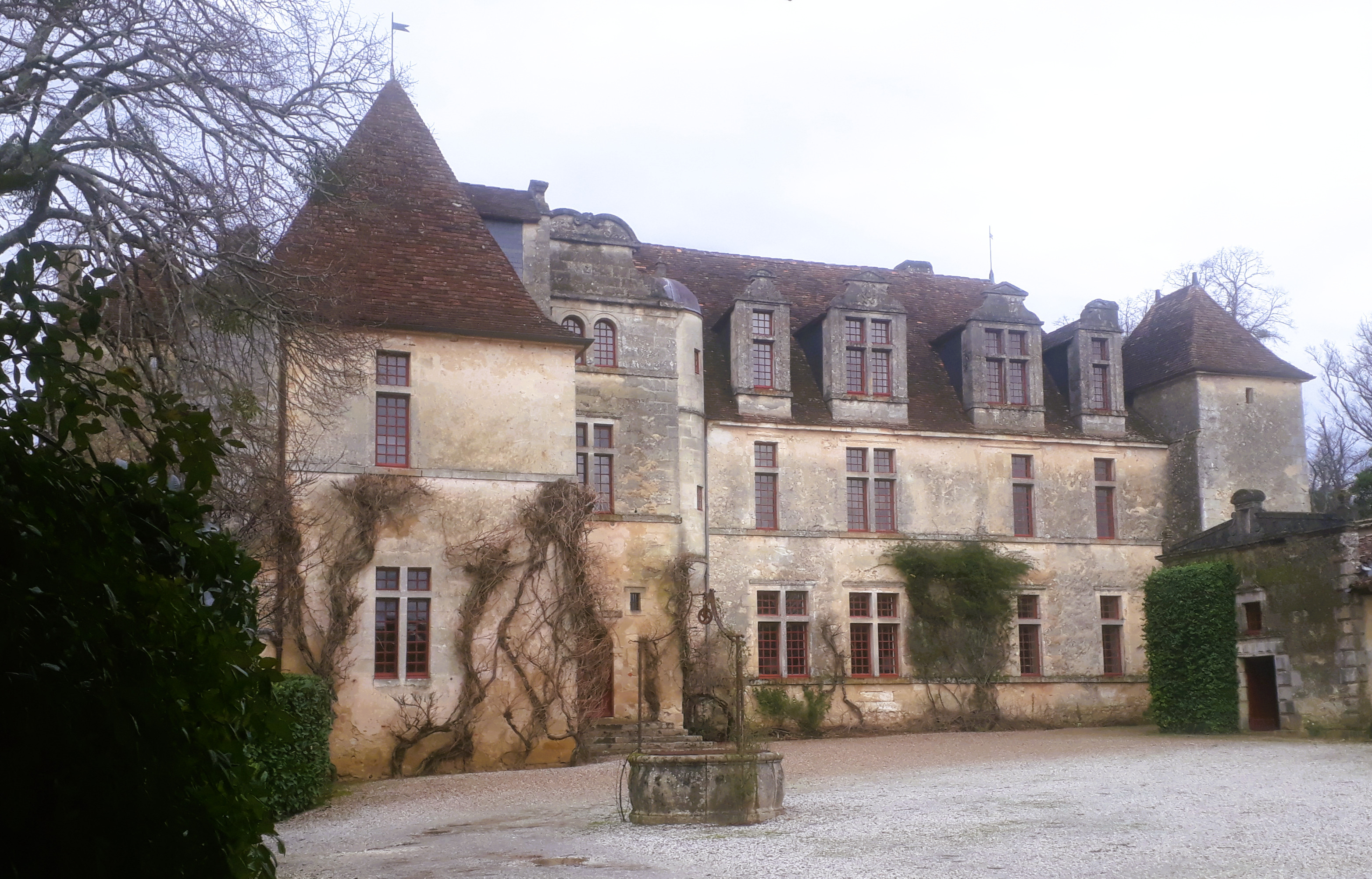
- Château Le Grand Verdus in 2024
- Interactive map of the Château Le Grand Verdus area

General information
- Coordinates: 44°47′40″N 0°23′45″W

The Château Le Grand Verdus is a manor house and a Bordeaux wine estate in Sadirac, Gironde, Aquitaine, France. The Renaissance-style residence was built in the 16th century. The vineyard produces a wide variety of wines, both Bordeaux appellations and those without a geographical indication (Vin de France). It has been certified organic since the 2023 vintage.

The château was built in the 16th century.

== History ==
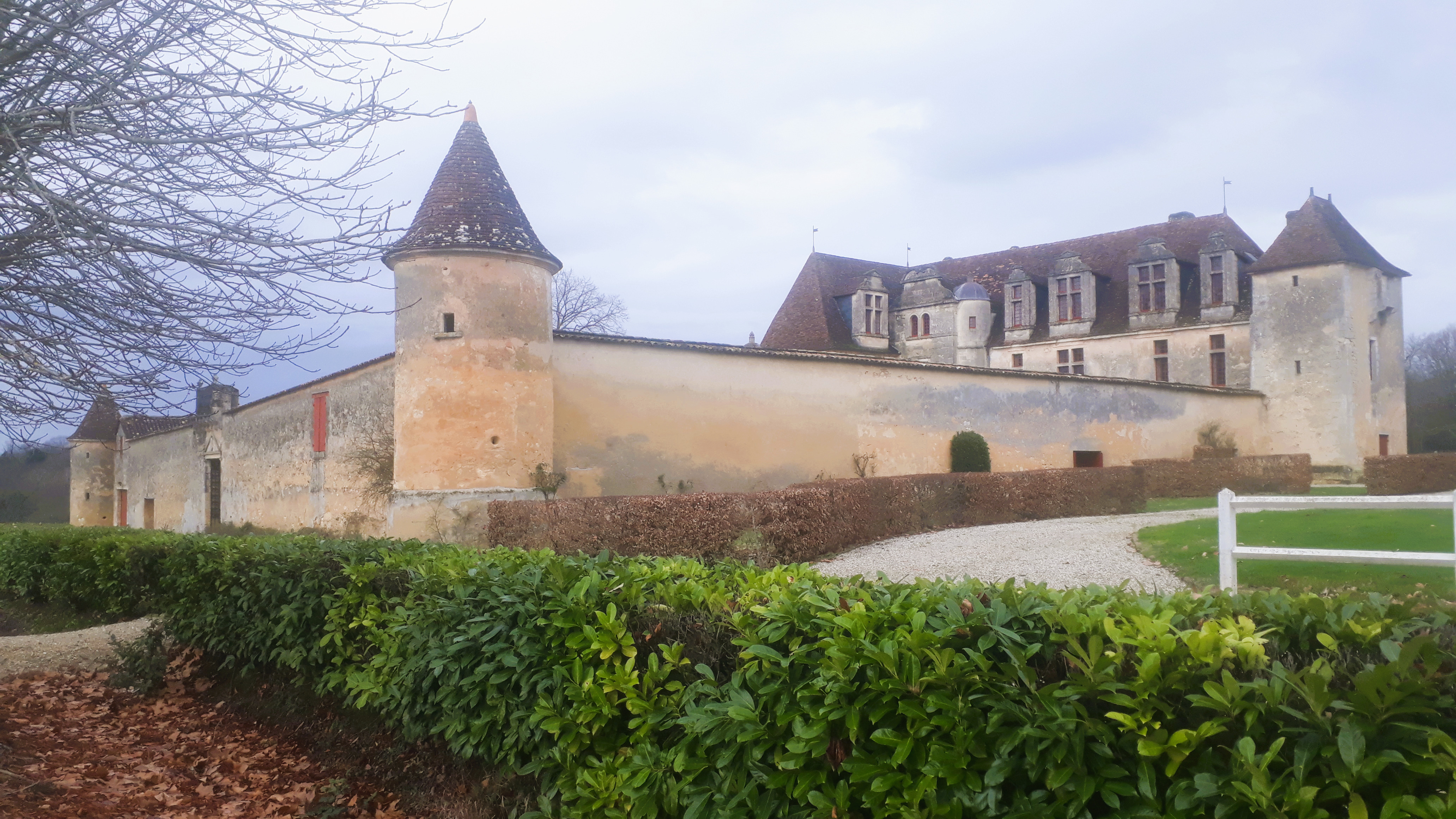
The south and east wall and the entrance to the main courtyard

At the place called Le Grand Verdus, vines were present in the 11th century. Towards the end of the Middle Ages, the site was a fortified stronghold whose first lord was Arnaud de Bonneau. The current fortified manor house in the Renaissance style was built in 1579.

In 1846, Le Grand Verdus became the property of Pierre Alphonse Deschamps (1799-1866[8]), son of Claude Deschamps (1765-1843), architect of the masson bridges of Bordeaux and Libourne. He and his wife, Clothilde Le Grix de La Salle (1810-1862[8]), had no children. The estate was inherited by Clothilde's brother, Charles Le Grix de La Salle (1812-1889), whose descendants still own the estate.

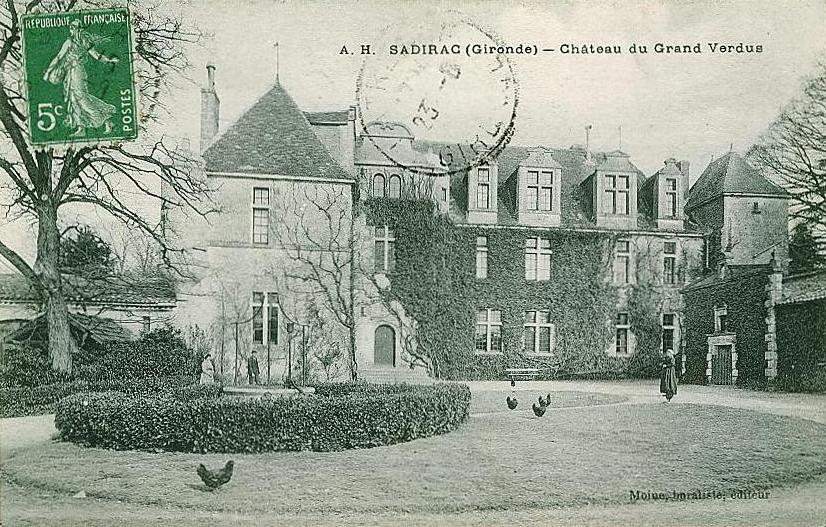
The house at the beginning of the 20th century

Philippe Le Grix de La Salle (1920-2016) was the first winemaker in the family and began his business just after the Second World War. The estate mainly produced sweet white wine, exported notably to Germany. In 1973, he left the Créon cooperative winery, uprooted the white vines to plant red, and created the label "Château Le Grand Verdus".

In the 1970s, the west wing, probably a former attic, was converted into a winery by Philippe Le Grix de La Salle and Émile Peynaud, a pioneer of oenology. To compensate for the limited space, a row of stainless steel tanks was placed on top of a bank of concrete tanks. He then collaborated with Pascal Ribéreau-Gayon.

In 1975, Philippe Le Grix de La Salle was joined by his son Antoine, returning from an internship in California with Robert Mondavi. Together, for 20 years, they developed the export of the estate's wines while expanding the vineyard plots until becoming one of the largest private producers in the Bordeaux-Supérieur AOC.

Since the 2000s, Antoine Le Grix de La Salle's sons, Édouard (in charge of viticulture) and Thomas (in charge of winemaking and marketing), have managed the estate. In 2005, the château replanted white grape varieties, the production of which has grown rapidly and is distributed in more than 35 countries.

In 2018, Thomas Le Grix de La Salle commissioned the architectural firm Fabre et de Marien to design an extension that included a new, semi-underground barrel cellar to optimize maturing conditions, and a new, ultra-modern vat room, resembling a giant metallic origami

The winery has been certified organic since the 2023 vintage.

== Architectural significance ==
It has been listed as an official monument since 1978.

== Winery ==
=== Vignoble et terroir ===
In 2026, the vineyard with its marked slopes will extend over 100 hectares. It represents a mosaic of terroirs with a very strong dominance of clay, outcropping limestone and a specific microclimate (southern flora).

80% is planted with red grape varieties: Merlot (60%), Cabernet Sauvignon (20%), Cabernet Franc (19%), and Syrah (1%). The remaining 20% is planted with white grape varieties: Sauvignon Blanc (65%), Sémillon (35%), and a small amount of Chenin Blanc since 2021. Experiments are also being conducted with small plantings of old grape varieties (Carménère, Petit Verdot, Castets, Malbec, Bouchalès, Mancin, Saint-Macaire, Pardotte, Jurançon Noir[5]) to study their evolution under the current climate through micro-cuvées of each variety over several vintages.

The vineyard is undergoing soil studies to optimize grape variety/terroir combinations. The vines are now replanted at a density of 4,500–5,000 vines/ha.

In 2020, the estate began its conversion to organic farming (certification expected in 2023) and is developing agroecological practices, notably through the creation of ecological corridors. Agroforestry is also being tested, with the establishment of hedgerows around the plots and the planting of fruit trees among the vines in an experimental plot.

== Wines ==
In 2023, the château produced 600,000 bottles, including 150,000 whites, and sold a good portion of them directly in 32 countries.

The range comprises 16 wines, grouped into 7 main categories:

- Classiques, bearing the historic "Château Le Grand Verdus" label, aged in stainless steel and concrete tanks and available as Bordeaux Supérieur, Bordeaux Blanc, and Bordeaux Rosé;
- Petites Cuvées, (Bordeaux Supérieur, Bordeaux Blanc, and Bordeaux Rosé);
- Originales (Vin de France, Bordeaux Supérieur), made from blends of different vintages or aged for extended periods;
- Grandes Réserves (Bordeaux Supérieur, Bordeaux Blanc), "atypical wines" from six different parcels;
- Parcellaires (Vin de France, Bordeaux), two single-varietal red wines that depart from Bordeaux classicism, one made from Syrah grapes from the Rhône Valley planted on an atypical terroir of granitic gravel, the other from Cabernet Franc grapes grown on a limestone base;
- Divergentes (Vin de France, Bordeaux), with a macerated white cuvée or "orange wine," a macerated wine made from Sémillon grapes aged like a red wine, and a red cuvée made from Merlot grapes with no added sulfites;
- Petites Bulles, a naturally sparkling white wine made from black grapes grown in cool terroirs from Cabernet Franc and Merlot grapes with a touch of Sauvignon Blanc.

=== Fruit Beer ===
Since 2012, Thomas le Grix de La Salle has been developing an organic malt beer, fermented with Sauvignon Blanc juice from Grand Verdus and brewed locally. The result is a fruit beer similar to those produced in Belgium.

== See also ==
- Bordeaux wine
- Entre-deux-Mers
