= Sadirac =

- Commune
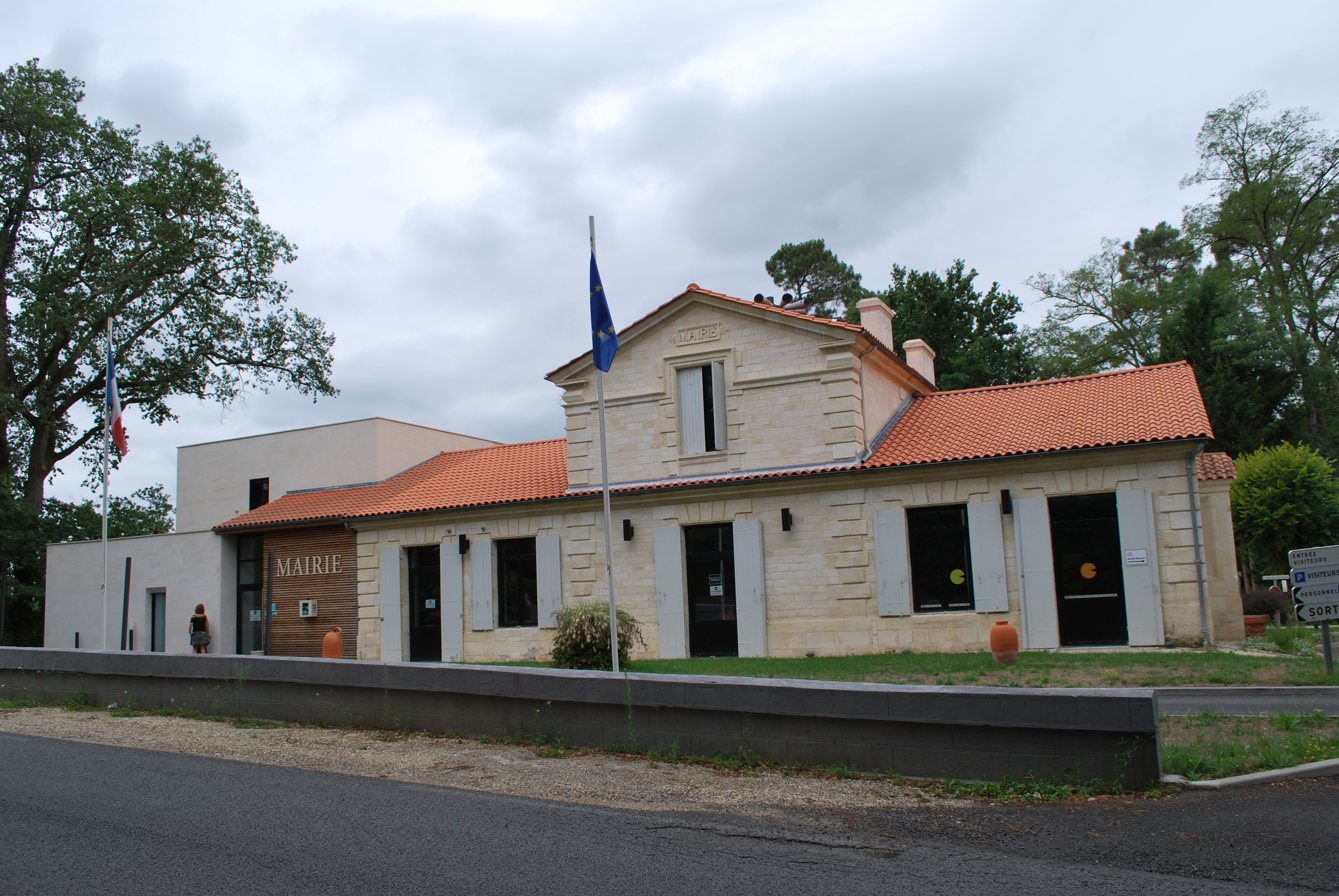
- The town hall in Sadirac

- Coat of arms
- Location of Sadirac
- Location within France Location within Nouvelle-Aquitaine
- Coordinates: 44°46′57″N 0°24′32″W
- Country: France
- Region: Nouvelle-Aquitaine
- Department: Gironde
- Arrondissement: Bordeaux
- Canton: Créon
- Intercommunality: Créonnais

Government
  - Mayor (2020–2026): Patrick Gomez
- Area^{1}: 19.11 km^{2} (7.38 sq mi)
- Elevation: 46 m (151 ft)
- Highest elevation: 112 m (367 ft)
- Lowest elevation: 31 m (102 ft)
- Population (2023): 4,769
  - Density: 249.6/km^{2} (646.3/sq mi)
- Time zone: UTC+01:00 (CET)
  - Summer (DST): UTC+02:00 (CEST)
- INSEE/Postal code: 33363 /33670
- ^{1} French Land Register data, which excludes lakes, ponds, glaciers > 1 km^{2} (0.386 sq mi or 247 acres) and river estuaries.

Sadirac (French pronunciation: [sadiʁak]) is a commune in the Gironde department in Nouvelle-Aquitaine in southwestern France.

== Population ==
Historical population
Year	Pop.	±% p.a.
1968	1,043	—
1975	1,206	+2.10%
1982	2,116	+8.36%
1990	2,899	+4.01%
1999	3,022	+0.46%
2007	3,361	+1.34%
2012	3,653	+1.68%
2017	4,244	+3.04%
2023	4,769	+1.96%
Source: INSEE

== Heritage ==
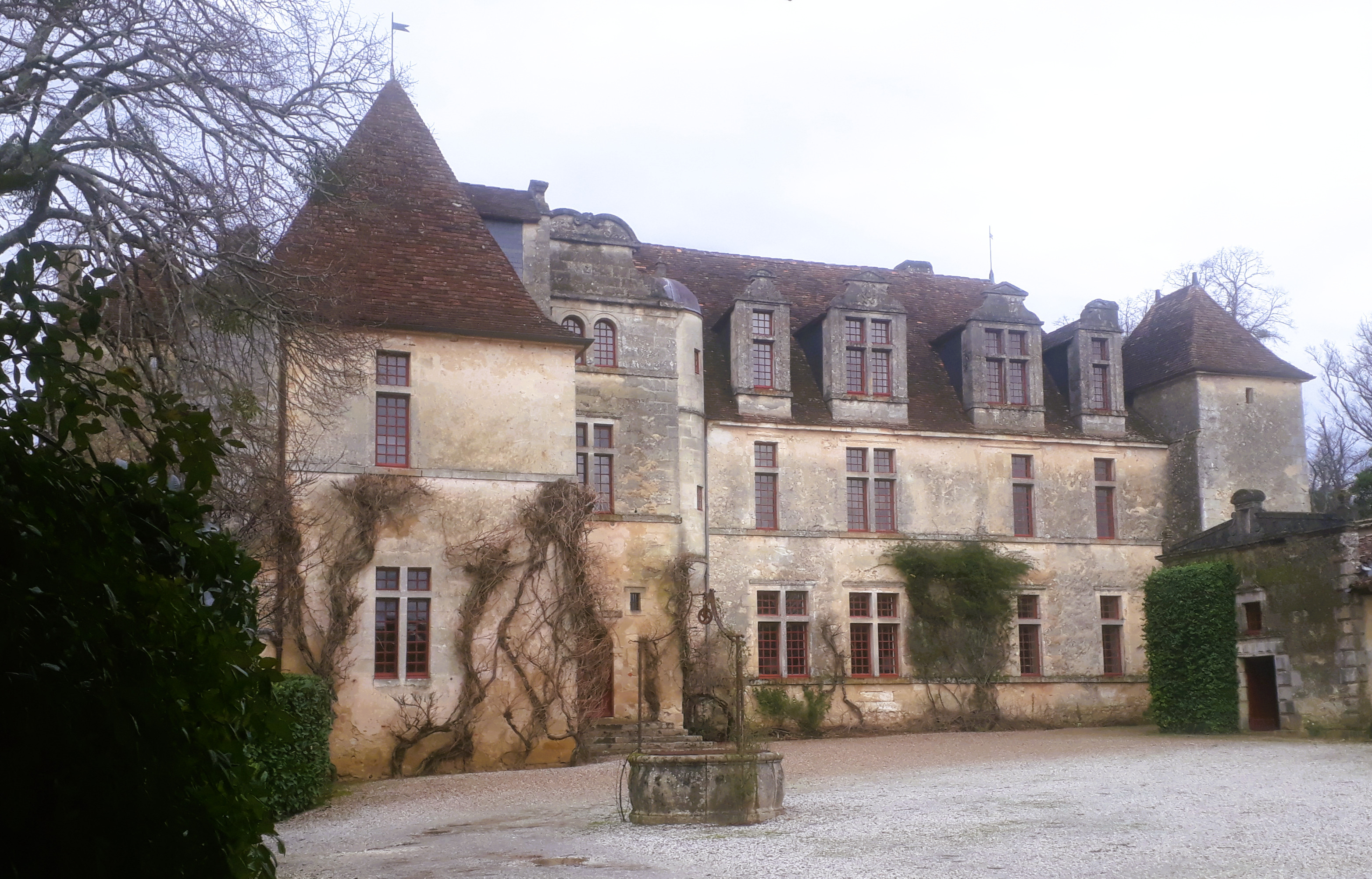
Château Le Grand Verdus

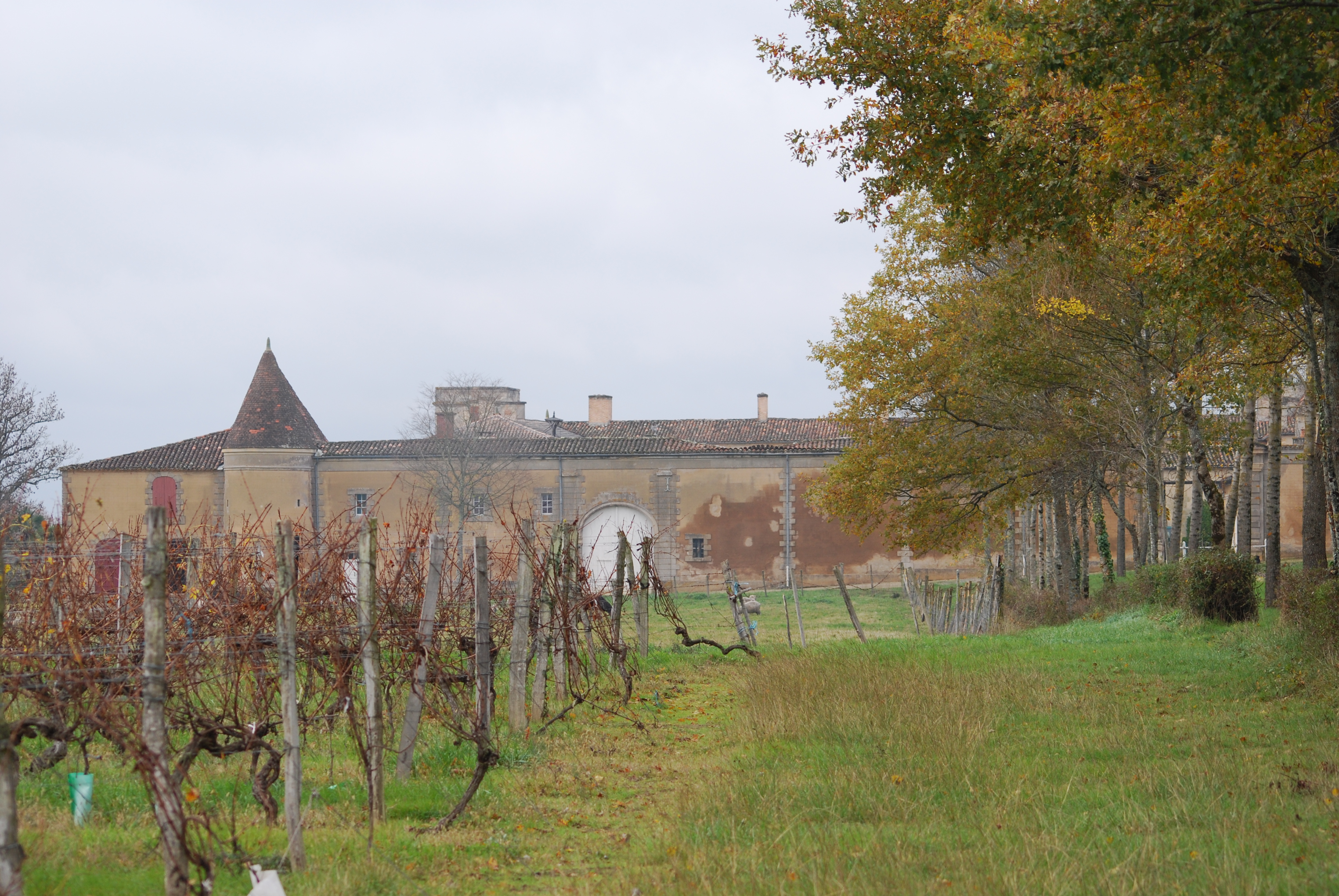
Château de Tustal

== See also ==
- Communes of the Gironde department
