= Sauvignon gris =

Variety of wine grape

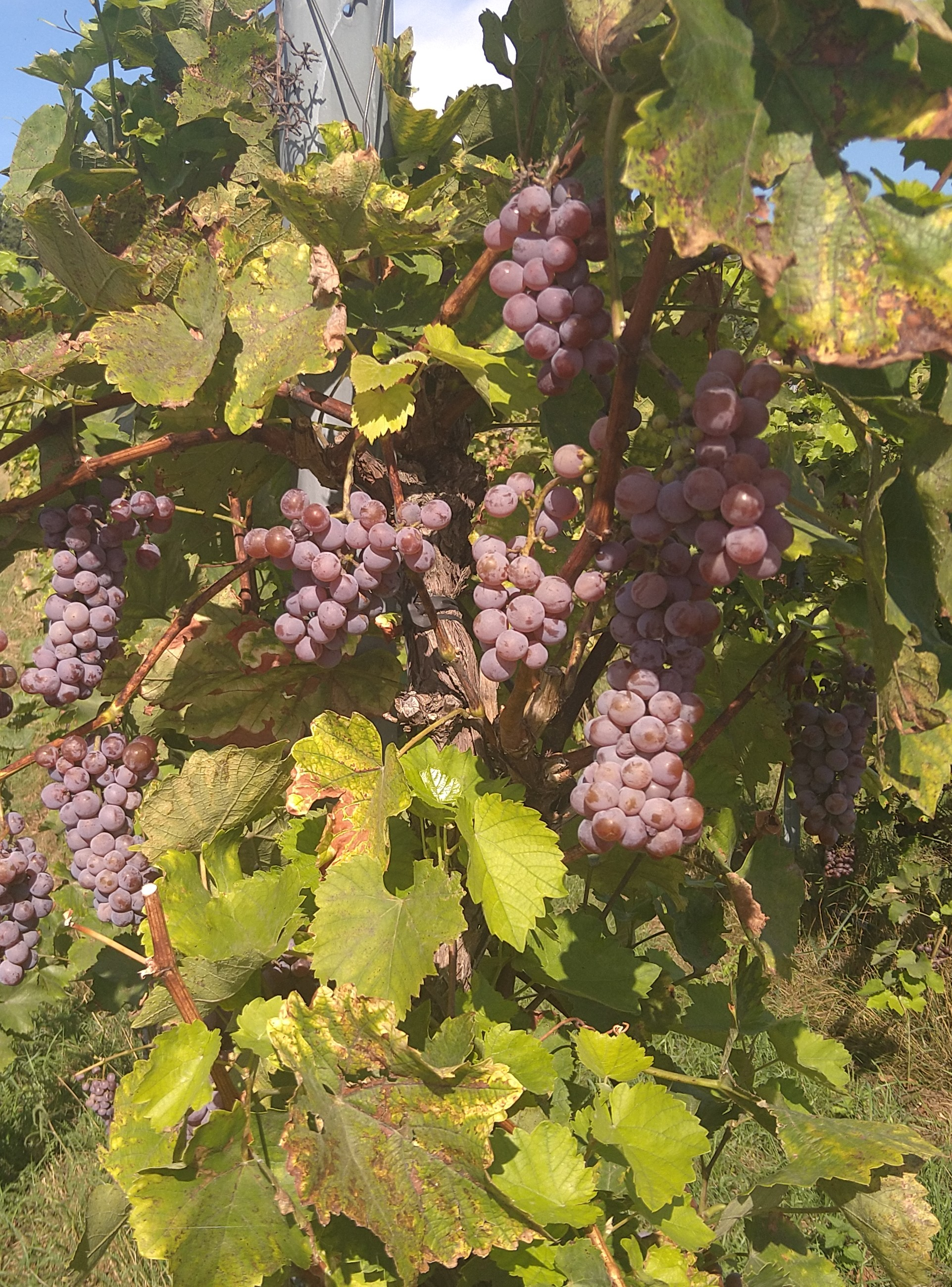
Sauvignon gris

Sauvignon gris (French pronunciation: [soviɲɔ̃ ɡʁi]) is a pink-colored wine grape that is a clonal mutation of Sauvignon blanc. The grape is primarily found in Bordeaux and Chile, where it was imported with Sauvignon blanc and Sauvignon vert cuttings. The grape produces less aromatic wines and is often used for blending.
