= Drops of God =

Japanese manga series

- First tankōbon volume cover, featuring Shizuku Kanzaki

神の雫 (Kami no Shizuku)
- Genre: Cooking; Drama
- Manga
- Written by: Tadashi Agi (Shin Kibayashi, Yuko Kibayashi)
- Illustrated by: Shu Okimoto
- Published by: Kodansha
- English publisher: NA: Vertical
- Imprint: Morning KC
- Magazine: Weekly Morning
- Original run: November 18, 2004 – June 12, 2014
- Volumes: 44
- Manga

Drops of God: Mariage
- Written by: Tadashi Agi
- Illustrated by: Shu Okimoto
- Published by: Kodansha
- Imprint: Morning KC
- Magazine: Weekly Morning
- Original run: May 28, 2015 – October 15, 2020
- Volumes: 26
- Manga

Drops of God deuxième
- Written by: Tadashi Agi
- Illustrated by: Shu Okimoto
- Published by: Kodansha
- Imprint: Morning KC
- Magazine: Weekly Morning
- Original run: September 21, 2023 – April 18, 2024
- Volumes: 2
- Anime television series
- Directed by: Kenji Itoso
- Written by: Yū Mitsuru
- Music by: Eishi Segawa
- Studio: Satelight (Note: Animation production assistance (アニメーション制作協力) for the series provided by Yanchester.)
- Licensed by: Crunchyroll; SEA: Tropics Entertainment
- Original network: Tokyo MX, BS NTV, Kansai TV, HBC
- Original run: April 10, 2026 – September 18, 2026
- Episodes: 24
- Television drama
- Kami no Shizuku (2009); Drops of God (2023)
- icon

Drops of God (Japanese: 神の雫, Hepburn: Kami no Shizuku) is a Japanese manga series written by Tadashi Agi, a pseudonym employed by creative team of sister and brother Yuko and Shin Kibayashi, and illustrated by Shu Okimoto. The story, about wine, is told in two parts – the first part focusing on protagonist Shizuku Kanzaki and his rival Issei Tomine on their search of the "Twelve Apostles" wines, and the second focusing on finding the "Drops of God". A third part of the series, serving as a short sequel, details Shizuku's life after the competition and taking Issei's daughter under his wing.

The series was serialized in Kodansha's seinen manga magazine Weekly Morning in Japan from November 2004 to June 2014. A sequel manga series, titled Drops of God: Mariage (マリアージュ ～神の雫 最終章～, Mariāju - Kami no Shizuku Saishūshō) was serialized from May 2015 to October 2020. The story continues where the original manga left off, focusing on Shizuku traveling abroad to deepen his knowledge of wine and his search for the "Drops of God", with the theme being the "marriage" between wine and food, exploring the many different combinations between them.

On September 13, 2023, another sequel was announced, titled Drops of God deuxième (神の雫 deuxième, Kami no Shizuku deuxième) and was serialized in Weekly Morning from September 2023 to April 2024. The story takes place after Mariage, with an older Shizuku traveling the world and arriving in Paris to teach Issei's daughter about wine.

Drops of God is widely successful and received praise for its accurate knowledge of wines, characters, story, art, and is famous for its global impact on the wine market, especially the sales of wines profiled in the manga. The series also inspired two live-action television adaptations. An anime television series adaptation produced by Satelight aired from April to September 2026.

== Plot ==
Shizuku Kanzaki is a junior employee in a Japanese beverages company, Taiyo ("Sun" in Japanese) Beer mainly focusing on selling beers. As the story opens, he receives news that his father, from whom he is estranged, has died. His father was the world-renowned wine critic Yutaka Kanzaki, who owned a vast and famous wine collection. Summoned to the family home, a splendid European style mansion, to hear the reading of his father's will, Shizuku learns that, in order to take ownership of his legacy, he must correctly identify, and describe in the manner of his late father, thirteen wines, the first twelve known as the "Twelve Apostles" and the thirteenth known as the "Drops of God" ("Kami no Shizuku" in the original Japanese edition and "Les Gouttes de Dieu" in the French translation), that his father has described in his will. He also learns that he has a competitor in this, a renowned young wine critic called Issei Tomine, who his father has apparently recently adopted as his other son.

Shizuku has never drunk wine, in part a reaction against the ruling passion of his late father, nor had any previous knowledge about wines. However, with strong senses of taste and smell, and an uncanny ability to describe his experiences from those senses, Shizuku submerges himself in the world of wine and tries to solve the mysteries of the 13 wines and defeat Issei. In this, he is also helped by knowledge gained from his time as a child with his father, and supported by his friends, including trainee sommelier Miyabi Shinohara and colleagues in the newly formed wine department of his company, which he now joins.

Following a draw on the "Apostles" wines, Shizuku and Issei received a near year-long grace period before the search for the "Drops of God" resumed. They are tasked by The Order of the Drops of God, a social club created by Yutaka and seven of his closest friends and fellow wine experts, to overcome each of their respective challenges to gain the seven pages of describing the "Drops of God" in Yukata's will. Aiding Shizuku in his competition are the family that operates the Western-style Izakaya Mama-Miya and other chefs, where Shizuku find temporary employment to study wine and food pairing.

== Production ==
=== Development ===
All the wines that appear in the comic are authentic, with authors Yuko and Shin Kibayashi being passionate wine lovers, even owning a 3,000-bottle collection. Despite neither author having professional wine qualifications, they grew up learning about French food and wine from their grandfather and drank wine every day as a hobby. One day, the siblings tried a 1985 DRC Échezeaux and become more entranced in the deeper aspects of the wine world, stating "when [they] had it, it made us think about the culture, the people, and we started to see these complex pictures and patterns like a rug. It made us see these illusions."

Whenever the siblings drank wine, they played a game of describing the "image" of wine, much like how characters in manga tend to do, and realized they shared "similar imagery without much diversion of vision from each other". Wanting to share their visions with other people, Shin suggested creating a manga centered around wine. When deciding which wine to feature in the manga, they researched and consulted with wine experts, and every wine that appeared in manga the siblings tasted. Based on a certain standard, they tasted various kinds of wine at all price ranges and from different parts of the world, even ones that don't appear in the manga. They excluded wines they thought readers would be disappointed in, regardless of price, or wines they personally found "unattractive", though they made sure no negative thoughts about wines were shown in the manga.

For the sequel series, the siblings became more interested in food pairing after introduced the pairing of oysters and Chablis wine in The Drops of God. In the depiction of Drops of God: Mariage, they wanted to emphasize how food and wine were intrinsic with each other, as there "are combinations that complement each other and that work against each other". To find an exquisite food pairing, they choose to spend time in their kitchen and at restaurants trying out different ingredients from Japanese, Chinese, and Western cuisines in order to find out what pairs best with wine.

=== Theme ===
As frequently shown in the manga, the theme of the manga centered around the deep complexity of wine and the "story" behind it, and how wine "mirrors a country's food culture and lifestyle." According to the authors, they stated that wine is the "main character" of the story, instead of the protagonists Shizuku and Issei.

In the series, the word "tenchijin" is used, which refers to the "elements that create wine: heaven/vintage, earth/terroir and man." A Japanese winemaker, Koji Nakata, used this on his wine label and was one of the inspirations for the sibling writers as they realized that "every amazing wine has these essences. It needs good terroir, vintage, and more than anything, a good winemaker... None of these essences can be absent to create a good wine. Even if one of them overpowers the other, it'll offset the balance. It's not simply an industrial product. When a person receives the gift from heaven and the earth, he can create wine. In the back of our mind, we always wanted to convey how amazing that is."

== Characters ==
Shizuku Kanzaki (神咲雫, Kanzaki Shizuku)
Voiced by: Kazuya Kamenashi (Japanese); Christopher Guerrero (English)
A young employee in Taiyo Beer beverages company, and the legitimate son of Yutaka Kanzaki and his late wife (who died when Shizuku was six). His father gave him an elite education about wine when he was still a child, though he didn't realize it until reaching adulthood. However, he started rebelling against his father in his teens, resenting his father's obsession over it, and finally drove him to join a beer company. Incidentally, he was transferred to the wine department in the company and started to undertake the task of finding the "Drops of God". His sense of taste and smell is extremely sensitive, so much so that he could discern the components of an unopened bottle of wine. He also inherited the superb intuition and verbal expressiveness about wine from his father. On the other hand, his knowledge about wine is amateur-level, but has been growing since he started working in the wine department and meeting various wine experts and lovers throughout his journey. He also travelled around the world with his father during childhood, giving gave a him broad experiences, being well-immersed in arts and culture of the world. The first wine he had ever tasted was Château Mont-Pérat.
Shizuku believes drinking is an essential part in understanding a wine, and comes to see wine drinking as a fun experience under any circumstance. He is simple-minded and optimistic, radiating a charming and warm personality that allows him to easily befriend anyone he meets and is helpful towards those in need. His concentration when pursuing goals and handsome appearance have attracted many women, but his insensitivity to romantic cues meant such feelings are normally unnoticed and unreciprocated.
Miyabi Shinohara (紫野原雅, Shinohara Miyabi)
Voiced by: Maaya Uchida (Japanese); Taylor Shaye (English)
A sommelier apprentice working in a French restaurant, she is very knowledgeable in all matters related to wine and has shown some talents in wine tasting. However, due to bad luck and a possible lack of intuition, she has failed to pass the Sommelier qualification exam several times. She was subsequently contracted by Taiyo Beer to work as a consultant for its wine department and eventually earned her sommelier license during Shizuku's year-long traveling.
She has been supporting Shizuku with her knowledge about wine, but Shizuku often mocks her to be too bookish about wine, though her skills improves as time passes. She almost always appears together with Shizuku, and harbors romantic feelings towards him, often expressing jealously over other women Shizuku spends time with. In the story, a running gag depicts Miyabi as having the habit of bringing a male friend to her apartment to drink wine, and almost always ending up drunk and waken up realizing she has undressed herself to her panties while drunk.
Yutaka Kanzaki (かんざき ゆたか, Kanzaki Yutaka)
Voiced by: Banjō Ginga (Japanese); Mike Smith (English)
Shizuki's father and was one of the leading wine collectors in the world, with his entire collection said to be worth around 2 billion yen at the current market price. At age 67, he died of pancreatic cancer before the beginning of the story and left a will that initiated the "Drops of God" search, with the underlying purpose of providing guidance to his two heirs, Shizuku and Issei. Yutaka was a globally renowned wine critic on par with Robert Parker and his writings used to influence the market price of various wines. In his younger days, Yutaka made a fortune through wine futures trading and has forged numerous connections throughout his lifetime, many of which Shizuku would become acquainted with during his journey.
Although enigmatic and deeply dedicated to his passion for wine, Yukata was ultimately a loving father to Shizuku, though he dislikes how Yukata put him through many strict, unique training methods in his youth and resented how Yukata seems to put wine over him and his late mother. During Issei's childhood, Yukata kept his distance from his older son, only checking in on him a few times, but eventually regretted this decision, thus including him in his will and legally adopted him one week before his death.
Issei Tomine (遠峰一青, Tōmine Issei)
Voiced by: Takuya Satō (Japanese); Reagan Murdock (English)
Young and charismatic, he is a renowned wine critic and became the adopted son of Yutaka shortly before his death, and set his eyes on Yutaka's huge wine collections. Shizuku and Issei are the two beneficiaries listed in Yutaka's will, subsequently he became the main rival of Shizuku in the search of "Drops of God". Issei is in fact the illegitimate son of Yutaka and Honoka, thus Shizuku's half-brother - a fact Issei is aware of and seek to surpass Yukata's legacy, though only a few people (not even Shizuku and Sarah) know this secret.
He is often seen as arrogant and cold, but is in fact extremely hard-working to improve his tasting skills and understanding of wine, enduring great hardship and even risked his own life to further his understanding of Yutaka's descriptions of wine in the will. For example, in the searches of "Drops of God", he traveled in Taklamakan Desert alone, climbed Mont Blanc, participated in multiple Marathons, and attempted deep diving. Issei has dedicated his life to wine to an obsessive degree, and will never lie about any matter related with wine, which is reflected in the fair-mindedness he has shown in his contest with Shizuku.
Christopher Watkins (クリストファー・ワトキンス, Watkins Christopher)
A young American man sent by his father, Charles Watkins, to join in the search of the "Twelve Apostles" wines, starting from the "Ninth Apostle" and onwards, as in accordance to Yukata's will. Raised by his wine expert father, he is a genius in wine tasting with experience and talent that rivals both Shizuku and Issei, such being was able to identify the first eight Apostles immediately after hearing the descriptions and even one-up them on a few occasions. However, at the end of the search of the "Ninth Apostle", Robert criticized him for simply "copying and presenting Yutaka's account" without truly understanding the nature of the wine. After this setback, Christopher decided to start a journey to his refined own understanding of wine, though he still observes the "Drops of God" competition for his father and unofficially participates in looking for the Apostles.
Although a frivolous self-admitted Japanophilia with a womanizer streak, Chris is a very sharp-minded, hard-working, and kind person, helping people along his journey. Despite knowing her feelings for Shizuku, Chris also develops a sincere crush on Miyabi, though she firmly rejects his romantic overtures.
Ryouko Kiryuu (きりゅうりょうこ, Kiryū Ryōko)
Voiced by: Yūko Kaida (Japanese); Maganda Marie (English)
She is Yutaka's lawyer and was naturally present when Yutaka made his will, being entrusted with the management of Yutaka's wine collection and the execution of his will. Along with Robert, Kiryuu presides as an overseer for the "Drops of God" search and thus a neutral figure in the competition, though she worries over Shizuku.
Shiro Fujieda (ふじえだ しろう, Fujieda Shirō)
Voiced by: Shinshū Fuji (Japanese); Christopher Caz (English)
The owner and sommelier of the wine bar "Monopole", the mentor of Miyabi and a trusted counselor for Shizuku. While quick remind Shizuku and his friends of their ever-growing tabs, he is very generous and often takes out fine wines to treat friends (such as Opus One and Calon-Ségur) and provides samples to help Shizuku whenever he needs it. In his younger days, he studied wine in France and used to be a member of the student protest and communist movements. Over the course of the series, more of Fujieda's personal life is revealed, such as his family and is eventually married to his old flame, Akie.
Soichiro Mishima (みしま そういちろう, Mishima Sōichirō)
Voiced by: Yūya Uchida (Japanese); Alex Hanback (English)
The owner of a famous restaurant chain and Miyabi used to work in one of his restaurants. At the beginning of the story, he was a cold-blooded businessman focusing on maximizing profits, such as instructing his managers to reduce stocks of wine in the restaurants and buy from nearby liquor stores when customers place orders instead. After Mishima reunited with his past lover Anne, he became a warmer and more generous person. Mishima is a good friend to Shizuku and Miyabi, lending them a hand from time-to-time and serves as another confidant to them, and they also helps him in return. Sometime later, Mishima was forced to closed his business due Maki and Issei, and moved to Paris to run a small wine shop.
Maki Saionji (さいおんじ マキ, Saionji Maki)
Voiced by: Misa Watanabe (Japanese); Brianna Roberts (English)
The president of Saionji Corporation / SAION Tradeing, which specializes in the import and sale of wine, granting her extensive connections in the fine wine business. She is the financial sponsor of Issei and his on-and-off casual lover, though she wishes to have Issei to herself, despite knowing his habit of having romantic flings with other women. Maki is an unscrupulous and spiteful woman that will do anything to achieve her own purpose, even once setting up a trap to disadvantage Shizuku in searching one of the Apostles, and driving Loulan away from Issei out of jealousy.
Robert Doi (どい ロベール, Doi Robēru)
Voiced by: Jin Urayama
Half-French half-Japanese, Robert is a member of the Order of the Drops of God and Yutaka's most trusted friend and rival, having known each other since their youth. An eccentric with a cranky temperament, he currently lives in a cardboard hut built in a park in Ginza called Chateau Robert, while in fact he is a billionaire and the park in which he lives is actually privately owned by himself. Known as the "Minstrel of Wine", Robert is a renowned wine connoisseur and has the experiences and talents to accurately identify the Apostles after hearing Yutaka's accounts in the will, hence serves as the unbiased judge of the "Drops of God" contest. Although neutral, he will sometimes give out advice to both Shikzuku and Issei. While he tries to hid it, Robert's health has been weakening over the course of the series, but is determine see Yukata's will through.
Sarah
Voiced by: Lynn
The half-French half-Japanese, maternal half-sister of Issei and a successful model, currently contracting with Taiyo Beer as its commercial model. She first drank wine at the age of 5, became a regular wine drinker at the age of 12, and started to fall in love with wine at the age of 14. She has extensive knowledge about wine, though not to the same extent as her brother, and Miyabi once commented Sarah is "like Madam Leroy". Sarah likes talking to Shizuku and has a somewhat devious interest in him, but keeps the fact that she is the sister of Issei away from Shizuku and sometimes checks on Shizuku's progress in searching various Apostles and reports the information back to Issei.
Kawarage (かわらげ)
Voiced by: Akihiko Ishizumi
The manager of the wine department of Taiyo Beer and is one of the founder of the wine department, having established it with his superior and fellow wine connoisseur. A reticent and gentle old man, he often appears invisible in the department, but his knowledge and love of wine is unparalleled in the department. He also trusts his subordinates a lot and acts like a father-figure towards them, which greatly aids Shizuku in his search for the Apostles wines.
Chosuka Honma (ほんま ちょうすけ, Honma Chōsuka)
Voiced by: Soshiro Hori
Shizuku's colleague in the wine department and a hardcore wine hobbyist. He was dumped by a French woman before and subsequently became a fierce supporter of Italian wine, having deep knowledge in that category. Of humble origins, both his parents died and he has devoted himself passionately to wine, with his small apartment is almost fully stuffed with wine storages. Despite clashing Shizuku at first, they become good friends and Honma looks after the younger members in a brotherly way and always eager to help Shizuku in his "Drops of God" competition. Tadashi modeled Chosuka after the real life Japanese wine critic Atsushi Honma.
Ryusuke Kido (きど りゅうすけ, Kido Ryūsuke)
The most junior employee in the wine department and most tech savvy out of all them. At first, he knew nothing about wine and wanted to be transferred to the PR department, but he was assigned to the wine department instead due to a mistake of the new employee training department. However, he was slowly brought into the world of wine, and started to appreciate the depth and delicacy of wine. He also started to develop romantic relationship with a female colleague in the company and enjoys trying wine together. Kido dreams of spreading cheap and delicious wine that is relatively unknown, including wines outside France and Italy, amid Japanese wine drinkers. As a running gag, Kido would often receive comical forms of abuse from Honma whenever he makes a cheeky remark.
Kyrgyz Loulan
Voiced by: Konomi Kohara
A Xinjiang girl with a Japanese mother who lives in the Taklamakna desert, and she was named after the ancient Loulan Kingdom. During the search of the second Apostle, Issei met her and she aided him in his mission. She knew nothing about wine at first, but has a superb sense of smell that rivals Shizuku's, prompting Issei invited her to come back to Japan to help him in the search of Apostles. She entered a romantic, somewhat casual relationship with him, but a jealous Maki eventually drive her away. Loulan then went to France alone and was adopted by Charles Watkins after witnessing her talent with wine. Under his masterful tutelage, Loulan learned more about wine and established herself as a genius wine taster in Paris in a matter of months, becoming a more sophisticated and confident person in the process. Having seen his obsessive devotion to wine first hand, she determined to surpass Issei in order to save him.
Junya Ishikawa (いしかわ じゅんや, Ishikawa Junya) and Kenya Ishikawa (いしかわ けんや, Ishikawa Kenya)
Twins brothers that are Miyabi's high school friends and they look after their family liquor store together after their father retired. Junya graduated from the elite Hitotsubashi University and believes "the quality of the wine depends on from which winemaker's hand it is made". Unlike Junya, Kenya used to be a Bōsōzoku and dropped out of high school and believes "the quality of the wine depends on from which vineyard it is made". Their constant bickering initially caused them to split the store in two sections, but Shizuku and Miyabi helps them find a compromise and develops a good friendship with the former.
Ryo Takasugi (たかすぎ りょう, Takasugi Ryo)
Smart, humble, and handsome, Ryo is Miyabi's high school classmate and her first love. Due to his wealthy family background, he was transferred to an elite private school where many of his schoolmates came from similarly wealthy backgrounds. There, his old value system was challenged and he slowly transformed to a brand-conscious and snobbish man. However, with the help of Miyabi, Shizuku and their colleagues Ryo regained his former self and rekindles his old friendships, as well forming one with Shizuku. After Ryo's father planned to send him to China to start new business there, Ryo proposed to Moegi, his former classmate's sister, and asked her to go to China together, which she accepts.
Moegi Tanaka (たなか もえぎ, Tanaka Moegi)
Ryo's girlfriend and Miyabi's old high school friend. She is a timid girl with low self-confidence, often thinking Miyabi and Ryo being a more matching couple. When invited to a party by Ryo, one of the girls in the party who knew Ryo in a miai tried to humiliate the humble-looking Moegi, and tricked Moegi in participating in a blindfolded wine tasting contest. However, Moegi turned out to have a great intuition about wine, and her descriptions of the wine received compliments from Issei. After a few months of dating, Moegi accepted Ryo's proposal to China with her fiancé and help him start a new business there.
Honoka Tomine (とおみね ほのか, Tōmine Honoka)
A member of the Order of the Drops of God, she is known as the "Tasting Witch", a leading wine taster in France, and Yutaka's former lover. The mother of Issei and Sarah, and her husband (Sarah's father) is the director of a major airline. She had a complex relationship with Yutaka and is haunted by past, which reflects her peculiar relations with Issei and Shizuku. When Issei was a child, Honoka once attempted to kill him in a snow mountain during a depressive episode, which she is deeply ashamed of.
She has placed herself as a neutral figure in the contest between Shizuku and Issei, though will give them advice to nudge them in the right direction. However, both Honoka and Robert realize her personal feelings was affecting her judgement and stepped down of the Order, allowing her to be more relax.
Charles Watkins
Known as the "Noble Wine Collector", he is the father of Christopher Watkins and is one of the most wealthiest men in American, having a hand in many businesses and is a renowned wine collector. Similar to Robert, He is a long-time friend and rival of Yukata, and a member of the Order of the Drops of God. However, Charles also has complex love-hate relationship with Yukata, and according to Chris, wishes to take "revenge" against him by using Chris and his adoptive daughter, Loulan, to interfere in the "Drops of God" search.
Yoshida
The kind and gentle butler and caretaker of the Kanzaki mansion. During the "Drops of God" competition, he is a quiet neutral figure that helps with the service and attends to the various figures that visit the mansion, but he deeply cares for Shizuku and is privy to the fact Issei is his master's illegitimate son.
Komi Mamiya
A bright, sensible and friendly young woman that helps runs her family's Izakaya and helps Shizuku during his last months of traveling by employing him at the restaurant. More practical than her father, she sometimes argue with him over decisions, but wholly supports those she loves.
Kurazo Mamiya
Owner and chef of the Western-style, multi-location Izakaya Mama-Miya. A proud and stubborn man who runs his business with his wife Kami and daughter Komi. Despite being trained in French-style cooking, he knows little about wine, relying on Shizuku and others on such matters to create good pairings.
Tohru Kamoshida
Mama-Miya's sommelier and Komi's boyfriend, who is in charge of Mama-Miya's secondary branch. His family runs a sushi restaurant, but choose to earnestly devotes himself to wine and is a promising talent, but struggle with picking out proper wine and food pairings.
Count Romano Visconti
Known as the "Silent Wine Aristocrat", he is a strict and assertive member of the Order of the Drops of God.
Francoise Black
Known as the "Empress of the Vineyards", she is a member of the Order of the Drops of God with great artistic sense.
Lord Henry Gilbert
Known as the "Arbiter of Wine", he is a fair and impartial member of the Order of the Drops of God and a wine critic.
Andrew Wang
Known as the "Gold Taster", he is a cunning and capricious member of the Order of the Drops of God. With lineage that ties back royalty and nobles, Wang is successful entrepreneur and owns a large collection of wines that rivals Yukata. Wang possess excellent wisdom and knowledge of food/wine pairings, with only Yukata surpassing him and harbors deep reverence towards his old friend.
Émilie Mikasa
Half-Japanese Half-French chef that specialize in classic French cuisine. While serious and aloof, she's a pleasant, moral and passionate person, even outing herself for being put in unfair advantage by her sponsor in a competition. She moved to Paris to open a new restaurant and helped Shizuku in picking out wines for the "Drops of God" challenge. As small running gag, she has a habit of snapping corks with her bare hands when annoyed.
Louis Bernard
The Corsican owner of the business license and sommelier of Chef Mikasa's Paris restaurant, which he ran years ago with his deceased friend Alain before being it was shut down. Stubborn and traditional, he's proud of French wine and has little knowledge of New World wines, but putting in effort overcomes his biases. Aiding Mikasa in reopening his former place, he fell in love with Mikasa and the happy couple quickly married.
Jiro Bernard
Half-French half-Japanese, he is the son of Louis and his first wife, who died when he was young. Sweet and earnest, he is a patissier apprentice that studied under famous pastry chef Toshi Yoroizuka, and wish to find pairings with New World wines and French cuisine.
Harashima
The hard-working and honorable chef and owner of the popular Bistro 9. A famous former high school baseball player, he runs the Bistro with his former teammates and is affectionally called "Captain". After meeting Shizuku in a competition, the two became friends each other and consult with each other over food and wine.

== The "Twelve Apostles" and "The Drops of God" ==
To win each round of the competition to identify the 13 mystery wines, Shizuku and Issei have to present a correct choice of wine and a justification of the choice which most closely matches Yutaka's description of the wine in his will. The judge is Yutaka's old friend Robert Doi. The thirteenth wine, "The Drops of God", is never revealed in the series, stating every person has own personal "Drops of God" because every person's taste is different.

	Shizuku's choice	Country	Issei's choice	Country	References
First Apostle	2001 Georges Roumier Chambolle Musigny 1er Cru Les Amoureuses	France	1999 Georges Roumier Chambolle Musigny 1er Cru Les Amoureuses	France	
Second Apostle	2000 Château Palmer	France	1999 Château Palmer	France	
Third Apostle^{a}	2000 Santa Duc Gigondas	France	1981 Château de Beaucastel Châteauneuf-du-Pape	France	
Rematch^{b}	2000 Pégaü Châteauneuf-du-Pape Cuvée da Capo	France	2000 Pégaü Châteauneuf-du-Pape Cuvée da Capo	France	
Fourth Apostle	1992 Château Lafleur	France	1994 Château Lafleur	France	
Fifth Apostle	2000 Marc Colin Montrachet	France	2000 Michel Colin-Deléger Chevalier-Montrachet	France	
Sixth Apostle	2001 Luciano Sandrone Barolo Cannubi Boschis	Italy	2001 Bruno Giacosa Barolo Falleto	Italy	
Seventh Apostle	2003 Glaetzer Amon-Ra Shiraz Barossa Valley	Australia	2003 Sine Qua Non The Inaugural (Eleven Confessions) Syrah Central Coast AVA	USA	
Eighth Apostle	Jacques Selosse Cuvée Exquise NV	France	2000 Billecart-Salmon Cuvée Elisabeth Salmon Brut Rosé	France	
Ninth Apostle^{c}	2005 Brunello di Montalcino Poggio di Sotto	Italy	2005 Brunello di Montalcino Poggio di Sotto	Italy	
Tenth Apostle	2002 Grands Échezeaux Grand cru Robert Sirugue	France	2007 Grands Échezeaux Grand cru Robert Sirugue	France	
Eleventh Apostle	Priorat (DOC) 2008, Les Manyes - Terroir Al Limit	Spain	Priorat (DOC) 2008, domaine Ferrer Bobet - Seleccio Especial	Spain	
Twelfth Apostle	Château d'Yquem 1976	France	Château d'Yquem 1975	France	
Drops of God					

Green background means the competitor won the round and picked the correct wine.
^a Both choices were judged to be incorrect, therefore a rematch was held.
^b Although they selected the same wine, as Issei refused to describe his wine, he was judged to have lost this round of the competition.
^c Christopher also participated in this contest and found the correct wine. However, Issei's description of the wine was closest to Yutaka's understanding, and was judged as the victor by Robert.

== Wines ==
The following is a list of the wines appearing in the manga series.

Tankōbon volume	Chapter number	Wine
Volume 1	Chapter 1	Domaine de la Romanée-Conti Richebourg 1990; Aleth Le Royer-Girardin Pommard Rugiens 2000; Aleth Le Royer-Girardin Pommard Rugiens 1999; Henri Jayer Richebourg 1959
Volume 1	Chapter 2	Château Mouton Rothschild 1982
Volume 1	Chapter 3	Château Mont-Pérat 2001; Opus One 2000
Volume 1	Chapter 5	Henri Jayer Vosne-Romanee Cros-Parantoux 1999
Volume 1	Chapter 6	Emmanuel Rouget Vosne-Romanée 1er Cru Les Beaumonts 1997
Volume 1	Chapter 7	Miani Rosso; Domaine Jean Gros Vosne-Romanée 2001; Domaine Jean Gros Echézeaux Grand Cru 2002
Volume 2	Chapter 9	Champagne Salon 1995
Volume 2	Chapter 10	Emmanuel Rouget Vosne-Romanée 1er Cru Cros Parantoux 1999
Volume 2	Chapter 11	Château d'Yquem 1990; Château Calon-Ségur 2000
Volume 2	Chapter 14	Château Mouton Rothschild 2000
Volume 2	Chapter 16	Château Lagrange 1996
Volume 2	Chapter 17	Château Giscours Le Haut-Médoc de Giscours 2000
Volume 3	Chapter 19	Verget Chablis 1er Cru 'Vaillons' 2003
Volume 3	Chapter 20	Domaine Alain Hudelot-Noëllat Chambolle-Musigny 2000
Volume 3	Chapter 22	Château de Saint Cosme 2001
Volume 3	Chapter 23	Domaine François Raveneau Chablis 1er Cru; Louis Jadot Chablis 2002
Volume 3	Chapter 25	Les Caves de la Loire Coteaux du Layon 1978
Volume 3	Chapter 26	Château La Mission Haut-Brion 2001; La Chapelle de la Mission Haut-Brion 2000; Château Le Pin 1982
Volume 3	Chapter 28	La Pousse d'Or Santenay 1er Cru 'Clos Tavannes' 2002
Volume 4	Chapter 29	Domaine Philippe et Vincent Lécheneaut Marsannay 'Les Sampagny' 2001
Volume 4	Chapter 34	Bellenda Contrada di Concenigo Colli di Conegliano Rosso; D'Angelo Canneto 2000; Velenosi Roggio del Filare
Volume 4	Chapter 35	Château Boyd-Cantenac 2001
Volume 4	Chapter 37	St. Michael-Eppan Sanct Valentin Alto Adige 2000
Volume 4	Chapter 38	Ata Rangi Pinot Noir
Volume 5	Chapter 40	Domaine Henri Gouges Nuits St. Georges 1996; Domaine Jean Yves Bizot Vosne-Romanee 2001; Domaine Jacques-Frederic Mugnier Chambolle-Musigny 2001
Volume 5	Chapter 42	Domaine Michel et Patrice Rion Chambolle-Musigny 2001
Volume 5	Chapter 44	Domaine Robert Groffier Pere & Fils Bonnes-Mares Grand Cru 1999; Domaine Robert Groffier Pere & Fils Bonnes-Mares Grand Cru 2001
Volume 5	Chapter 45	Château Lynch-Bages 1983
Volume 5	Chapter 48	Pavillon Blanc du Château Margaux 2002
Volume 6	Chapter 49	Château Talbot 1997; Château Talbot 1990
Volume 6	Chapter 50	Domaine Georges Roumier Chambolle Musigny 1er Cru Les Amoureuses 1999
Volume 6	Chapter 51	Domaine Georges Roumier Chambolle Musigny 1er Cru Les Amoureuses 2001
Volume 6	Chapter 52	Tua Rita Rosso Dei Notri Toscana 2003; Tenuta di Trinoro 'Palazzi' Toscana 1999
Volume 6	Chapter 54	Château Latour 2002; Château Margaux 2002; Château Lafite Rothschild 2002; Château Haut-Brion 2002; Château Mouton Rothschild 2002
Volume 6	Chapter 57	Château Lafite Rothschild 1984; Château Margaux 1970; Château Margaux 1978

== Media ==
=== Manga ===
Written by the sibling team Yuko and Shin Kibayashi under the pseudonym Tadashi Agi, Drops of God was serialized in Kodansha's seinen manga magazine Weekly Morning from November 18, 2004, (Note: Debuted in the magazine's 51st issue of 2004, released on November 18.) to June 12, 2014, (Note: Finished in the magazine's 28th issue of 2014, released on June 12.) with its chapters compiled in 44 tankōbon volumes and released from March 20, 2005, to July 23, 2014. It was also published in South Korea, Hong Kong, and Taiwan. Since April 2008, volumes have also been published in France by Glénat. By December 2007, the series had registered sales of more than 500,000 copies, which increased to over half a million copies, and by May 2021, more than 3.5 million copies. By August of the same year, the series has accumulated over 15 million copies in circulation.

Vertical Inc. published the series in North America under the title The Drops of God. After publishing four volumes (covering the first eight Japanese volumes and the first two Apostles), the fifth volume jumped ahead to the story arc for the Seventh Apostle (volumes 22 and 23 of the Japanese edition), published under the name The Drops of God: New World. Vertical stated that this was done "by author request" and urged readers to "tell all your friends about the series so there will be second and third seasons to fill in the gap!"

Starting October 14, 2019, Volumes 1–11 of the English translation were available digitally through ComiXology on Kindle, with plans to have all 44 volumes in English translation by Kodansha, which had been made available free for Amazon Prime members. In May 2020, volumes 12–22 of the English translation were released, alongside volumes 23–33 in October of that same year, with the final batch of volumes 34–44 released in May 2021. In Fall 2025, Kodansha USA started reprinting the printed, 2-in-1 omnibus editions of the manga.

==== Volume list ====
No.	Original release date	Original ISBN	English release date	English ISBN
1	March 20, 2005	978-4-06-372422-6	October 14, 2019 (digital)	9781646590421
1. The Scent of a Hundred Flowers (百の花の香り, Hyaku no Hana no Kaori); 2. A Prayer to the Fruitful Earth (豊饒なる大地への祈り, Hōjōnaru Daichi e no Inori); 3. The Profound and Subtle Queen (重厚にして繊細なる女王, Jūkō ni Shite Sensainaru Joō); 4. Over the Bed Wafts an Aroma of Awakening (ベッドの上は目覚めの香り, Beddo no Ue wa Mezame no Kaori); 5. The God of Burgundy (それはブルゴーニュの神様, Sore wa Burugōnyu no Kamisama); 6. A Maiden Fleeing through Strawberry Fields (苺畑で逃げゆく乙女, Ichigo Hata de Nige Yuku Otome); 7. Tasting in the Park (公園でテイスティング, Kōen de Teisutingu); 8. Cradling God's Blessing in Both Hands (この神の恵みを両手に抱いて, Kono Kami no Megumi o Ryōte ni Daite)
2	May 21, 2005	978-4-06-372435-6	October 14, 2019 (digital)	9781646590438
9. Draining the Glass of Reunion (再会のグラスを飲み干して, Saikai no Gurasu o Nomihoshite); 10. A Maiden Smiling in the Strawberry Fields (苺畑で微笑む乙女, Ichigo Hata de Hohoemu Otome); 11. The Sweet Dessert of Parting (別れのデザートは、甘く, Wakare no Dezāto wa, Amaku); 12. The Ones Who Watch Over (見届ける者たち, Mitodokeru-sha-tachi); 13. At All the Battles' Start (すべての闘いのはじまりに, Subete no Tatakai no Hajimari ni); 14. A Lovely, Cruel Flower (可憐で残酷な一輪の花, Karende Zankokuna Ichirin no Hana); 15. Tough Love for a Saucy Lolita (小粋なロリータに愛のムチを, Koikina Rorīta ni Ai no Muchi o); 16. The Mystery Man of the Wine Division (ワイン事業部の怪人, Wain Jigyōbu no Kaijin); 17. Merry-Go-Round (メリーゴーラウンド, Merī Gō Raundo); 18. A Fantastico Night (ファンタスティコの夜, Fantasutiko no Yoru)
3	August 21, 2005	978-4-06-372459-2	October 14, 2019 (digital)	9781646590445
19. Karma and Cuisine (因縁は料理とともに, Innen wa Ryōri to Tomon); 20. The Wine or the Cuisine (ワインか料理か, Wain ka Ryōri ka); 21. Father and Daughter (父と娘と, Chichitoko to); 22. Passionate Gods Awaken (熱き神々の覚醒, Atsuki Kamigami no Kakusei); 23. Chablis and Oysters; 24. And the True Preparations Begin (そして本当の準備を, Soshite Hontō no Junbi o); 25. Quietly a New Round Opens (新たな火蓋は静かに切られ, Aratana Hibuta wa Shizuka ni Kirare); 26. Happening Across a Wonderful Gift (素敵な贈り物には偶然に, Sutekina Okurimono wa Gūzen ni); 27. The Necessity of French Wine (フランスワインという必然, Furansu Wain to Iu Hitsuzen); 28. Downtown Wine Brothers Blues (下町純情ワイン兄弟, Shitamachi Junjō Wain Kyōdai)
4	November 20, 2005	978-4-06-372477-6	October 14, 2019 (digital)	9781646590452
29. Drink Daddy's Wine! (父ちゃんのワインを飲め！, Tōchan no Wain o Nome!); 30. Manly Tears! The Brothers' March (Otokonaki!? Shitamachi Junjō Kyōdai Kōshinkyoku); 31. Invitation to an Opulent Ball (華麗なる舞踏会への招待, Kareinaru Budōkai e no Shōtai); 32. Removing That Mask (その仮面を外して, Sono Kamen o Hazushite); 33. The Great French Wine Blunder (大いなる仏ワインの誤算, Ōinaru Futsu Wain no Gosan); 34. Dead Heat in the Entrance Hall (玄関ホールのデッドヒート, Genkan Hōru no Deddo Hīto); 35. One with Sunflowers at Dusk (落日の向日葵畑に心かさねて, Rakujitsu no Himawari Hatake ni Kokoro Kasanete); 36. Thus Spoke the Will from On High (天上の存在、遺言状はかく語りき, Tenjō no Sonzai, Igonjō wa Kaku Katariki); 37. Deep in a Hushed Forest of Mysteries (その静謐なる神秘の森の奥で, Sono Seihitsunaru Shinpi no Mori no Oku de); 38. Like Violet Butterflies Flitting Across the Surface (水面を彷徨う菫色の蝶に, Minamo o Samayō Sumireiro no Chō ni)
5	January 21, 2006	978-4-06-372490-5	October 14, 2019 (digital)	9781646590469
39. Closing Her Eyes at a Shimmering Past (眩し過ぎる過去に、女は瞳を閉じて, Mabushi Sugiro Kako ni, Onna wa Hitomi o Tojite); 40. Three Glasses Inviting to the Past (過去へと誘う３杯のグラス, Kako e to Izanau 3-pai no Gurasu); 41. The Zen Riddle of Tasting (テイスティング禅問答, Teisutingu Zenmondō); 42. Tasting in Cosplay (コスプレ・で・テイスティング, Kosupure de Teisutingu); 43. The Perfect World by the Spring (泉のほとりの完全なる世界, Izumi no Hotori no Kanzennaru Sekai); 44. Water Spouting from the Depths of Mystery (神秘の淵から湧き上がる水, Shinpi no Fuchi Kara Waki Agaru Mizu); 45. Until Despair Becomes Memory (絶望が思い出に変わるまで, Zetsubō ga Omoide ni Kawaru Made); 46. A Glass to Meet the Past (過去と出逢うためのグラス, Kako to Deau Tame no Gurasu); 47. Sometimes Love Goes with Silence (時に愛は、沈黙とともに――, Toki ni Ai wa, Chinmoku to Tomo ni); 48. An Angel Dances before the Dueling Knights (決闘の騎士の眼前で、天使が舞う, Kettō no Kishi no Ganzen de, Tenshi ga Mau)
6	April 21, 2006	978-4-06-372510-0	October 14, 2019 (digital)	9781646590476
49. With the War God's Blessing on the Eve of Battle (決戦前夜、軍神の加護を我が手に, Kessen Zenya, Gunshin no Kago o Ga ga Te ni); 50. The Too-Perfect Lovers (あまりにも完璧な恋人たち, Amarini mo Kanpekina Koibito-tachi); 51. Fashioned by Man (人の造りしもの, Hito no Tsukuri Shimo no); 52. Bittersweet the Taste of First Love (初恋の味はほろ苦く, Hatsukoi no Aji wa Horonigaku); 53. An Unforgettable Friend (忘れがたき旧友, Wasure Gataki Kyūyū); 54. To See That Old Smile Again (あの日の笑顔をもう一度, Ano Hi no Egao o Mōichido); 55. The Reigning Kings of Bordeaux (ボルドーに君臨する王者たち, Borudō ni Kunrin Suru Ōja-tachi); 56. A Deluge of Sensuality (官能の洪水, Kannō no Kōzui); 57. The Law of Transience (盛者必衰の理, Jōsha Hissui no Kotowari); 58. What Makes a Queen a Queen (女王たる所以, Joōtaru Yuen)
7	July 21, 2006	978-4-06-372543-8	October 14, 2019 (digital)	9781646590483
59. A Bitter Gift (甘くはないギフト, Amaku wanai Gifuto); 60. Left Bank Treasure Hunt (ボルドー左岸の宝探し, Borudō Sagan no Takarasagashi); 61. Two People, Separate Times (あれから二人、違う時間の中で, Ara Kara Futari, Chigau Jikan no Naka de); 62. Proof of Class (一流の証明, Ichiryū no Shōmei); 63. A Pegasus Soaring through Time (時を駆ける天馬, Toki o Kakeru Tenma); 64. Friends, Wine, and Yakitori (友とワインと焼き鳥と, Tomo to Wain to Yakitori to); 65. A Visitor from Yore (在りし日からの訪問客, Arishi Hi Kara no Hōmon Kyaku); 66. Yet Beautiful in Faded Sepia (セピアに色褪せて、なお美しく, Sepia ni Iroasete, Nao Utsukushiku); 67. A Mysterious Smile (微笑みはミステリアス, Hohoemi wa Misuteriasu); 68. Encountering da Vinci (ダ･ヴィンチとの邂逅, Da Vinchi to no Kaigō)
8	October 23, 2006	978-4-06-372556-8	October 14, 2019 (digital)	9781646590490
69. A Wine of Ill Will (悪意のワインボトル, Akui no Wain Botoru); 70. The Woman in the Wine (ワインに棲む女, Wain ni Sumu Onna); 71. Critical Point of Malice (悪意の臨界点, Akui no Rinkai-ten); 72. A Blood-Soaked Party (パーティーは血塗られて, Pātī wa Chinura Rete); 73. The Wages of an Affair (そして、関係の代償を, Soshite, Kankei no Daishō o); 74. Enveloped in a Sandstorm (砂の嵐に抱かれて, Suna no Arashi ni Idakarete); 75. Thinking of Mona Lisa (モナ・リザを想いながら, Mona Riza o Omoinagara); 76. To a Supple, Healing Smile (潤いと癒しの微笑みに, Uruoi to Iyashino Hohoemi ni); 77. A Toast of Remorse and Humiliation (悔恨と屈辱の乾杯, Kaikon to Kutsujoku no Kanpai); 78. To Bring Back the Wine (ワインを取り戻すために, Wain o Torimodosu Tame ni)
9	November 22, 2006	978-4-06-372569-8	October 14, 2019 (digital)	9781646590506
79. Pulling the Strings of Recollection (記憶の糸を手繰って, Kioku no Ito o Tagutte); 80. Memories Inside the Cave (思い出はカーヴの奥に, Omoide wa Kāvu no Oku ni); 81. Opened by the Sweet Aroma (甘き香りに扉を開いて, Amaki Kaori ni Tobira o Aite); 82. As Your World Expands, Just a Little (少しだけ広がるキミの世界, Sukoshi Dake Hirogaru Kimi no Sekai); 83. At a Wall Blocking Love (愛をさえぎる高い壁に, Ai o Saegiru Takai Kabe ni); 84. Father, Son, and Native Land (父と子と生まれた国と, Chantoko to Uma Reta Kuni to); 85. Threshold Between Heaven and Earth (天と地のはざまで、人は, Ten to Ji no Hazama de, Hito wa); 86. Mixing Together, Bold and Straight (混ざり合い、強くまっすぐに, Mazari Ai, Tsuyoku Massugu ni); 87. Hoping for Another Late-Night Chat (もう一度、夜更けに語り合いたくて, Mōichido, Yofuke ni Katariaitakute); 88. A New Compass Beyond the Desert (新たなる羅針盤は砂漠の彼方から, Aratanaru Rashinban wa Sabaku no Kanata Kara)
10	February 23, 2007	978-4-06-372578-0	October 14, 2019 (digital)	9781646590513
89. A Large Hand in a Nostalgic Land (郷愁の場所で出会った大きな手に, Kyōshū no Basho de Deatta Ōkina Te ni); 90. The Relentless Pursuit of Wine (追いかけて、追いかけてワイン, Oikakete, Oikakete Wain); 91. An Actress's Resolve at the Makeup Table (女優の決意はメイクの前に, Joyū no Ketsui wa Meiku no Mae ni); 92. In Search of the Banished Palate (封印されたその味覚のために, Fūin sa reta Sono Mikaku no Tame ni); 93. Bringing the Sweet Days of Youth to a Close (甘く薫る青春の日を終わらせて, Amaku Kaoru Seishun no Hi o Owara Sete); 94. A Sense of the Journey to Come (旅立ちの予感に抱かれるまま, Tabidachi no Yokan ni Daka reru mama); 95. Feeling the Passage of Decades (大いなる時の流れを、この身に感じて, Ōinaru Toki no Nagare o, Kono Mi ni Kanjite); 96. A Place Filled with Familiar and Non (新しさと懐かしさが出会う場所で, Atarashisa to Natsukashisa ga Deau Basho de); 97. Cultivating a Future Worth Pining For (懐かしい未来を育てる老人, Natsukashī Mirai o Sodateru Rōjin); 98. Connecting the Future, Connected to the Past (繋ぐ未来、繋がれる過去, Tsunagu Mirai, Tsunaga reru Kako)
11	May 23, 2007	978-4-06-372599-5	October 14, 2019 (digital)	9781646590520
99. Restive Nights, Reassured Mornings (戸惑いの夜も、確信の朝も, Tomadoi no Yoru mo, Kakushin no Asa mo); 100. The Fading Feel of the Ancient Tree's Bark (老木の手触りは虚空に消えて, Rōboku no Tezawari wa Kokū ni Kiete); 101. Into the Labyrinth, with No Escape Route (迷路の前で退路を断つ覚悟を, Meiro no Mae de Tairo o Tatsu Kakugo o); 102. The Long Road Beyond the Tree (老木へと続く遥かなる道を往け, Rōboku e to Tsudzuku Harukanaru Michi o Yuke); 103. Slumber of the Wine-Loving Artist (ワインを愛した芸術家のまどろみ, Wain o Aishita Geijutsuka no Madoromi); 104. An Aroma of Grapes, Long Kept Hidden (大切に隠された葡萄の香り, Taisetsu ni Kakusareta Budō no Kaori); 105. Enveloped by Double Handfuls of Love (両手いっぱいの愛に囲まれて, Ryōte-Ippai no Ai ni Kakoma rete); 106. Phantom Encounters at the After-Dark Playland (夜の遊園地で出会う幻影, Yoru no Yuenchi de Deau Genei); 107. Pride Staked on Silence (その誇りに懸けた沈黙, Sono Hokori ni Kaketa Chinmoku); 108. True Bitterness, Found After the Fact (遅れて知る真実の苦さ, Okurete Shiru Shinjitsu no Nigasa)
12	August 23, 2007	978-4-06-372622-0	May 6, 2021 (digital)	9781646592999
109. Seeds of Discontent, Growing in the Lonely Landscape; 110. The Trap Set in Place; 111. Trusted Bonds, Broken Wines; 112. A Goodbye Amid Turbulent Winds.; 113. Cheers to an All-too-Late Coincidence; 114. Across the Sea, to a New Challenge; 115. A Somehow Disengaged Relationship.; 116. The Sadness of Those Left Behind; 117. The Bottle that Lost Its Name.; 118. Aromatic Synchronicity.
13	November 6, 2007	978-4-06-372633-6	May 6, 2021 (digital)	9781646593002
119. A Pair's Genius, Amid the Phantoms of Wine; 120. Major Help from a Friend's Hand.; 121. Beyond the Rising Bubbles; 122. The Essential Champagne.; 123. Flames Burning Like Magic; 124. With the Matador of Joy.; 125. Butterflies Flying in the Spring of Good Tidings.; 126. Like the One I First Loved; 127. In Pursuit of Familiar Faces; 128. A Furtive Hand on an Enigmatic Head
14	December 6, 2007	978-4-06-372651-0	May 6, 2021 (digital)	9781646593019
129. A Deep Dive, When the Time is Right; 130. Her Strings Vibrating with Solitude.; 131. Uninhibited Above the Sunlit Grass; 132. A Kiss for the Young Hero..; 133. Bargaining Between Man and Woman; 134. A Beam of Light for a Sunken Heart.; 135. Dousing One's Memories in Wine; 136. Time Has a Way of Maturing a Man; 137. Guided by a Returning Smile; 138. The Master and the Cruel, Profound Reunion.
15	February 22, 2008	978-4-06-372664-0	May 6, 2021 (digital)	9781646593026
139. First Love, with a Single Tear Shed; 140. A Serenade Greeted by a Smile; 141. Embraced by a Mother's Image; 142. Uninvited Guest to a Night of Disappointment; 143. Soaking a Bitter Heart in Wine; 144. Wine Be Ever so Capricious; 145. In Pursuit of Vanished Goddesses; 146. The Queen's Wine, Paired with a Mystery; 147. When the Devil's Hand Brushes the Glass; 148. Beyond the Stairs to the Cellar
16	May 22, 2008	978-4-06-372686-2	May 6, 2021 (digital)	9781646593033
149. The Girl Who Gazed at the Desert Sunset; 150. Bewitched by the Persian Winds; 151. The Moment They Were Lured to Their Dreams; 152. Wild Fruit, Maturing With Time.; 153. Grant Your Bliss, O Silvery Goddess; 154. An Irreplaceable Encounter Off the Mount; 155. The Largest Rose in the World; 156. The Liquid Jewel, Sparkling Ominously; 157. Guided by a Shadowy, Formless Voice; 158. Their Hearts Soar Across Silvery Mountains
17	August 22, 2008	978-4-06-372725-8	May 6, 2021 (digital)	9781646593040
159: A Joyful Oath Atop Snow-capped Mt. Yari; 160: The Great Rose Burns Anew; 161: Aflight and Tempted by the Lure of Mischief; 162: The Aloof Guide Shuts the Door; 163: A Firm Handshake with a Trustworthy Friend; 164: In Search of Faint Light Amidst Stormy Skies; 165: The Siren Song of a Snow-Colored Demon; 166: Terrified of the Gentle Call of Death; 167: Waiting for a Rival Beloved Beyond Friendship; 168: The Turned Figure Within Wispy Memories
18	November 21, 2008	978-4-06-372751-7	May 6, 2021 (digital)	9781646593057
169 The Graceful White Peak, Revived; 170. The Stern, Yet Gentle Voice; 171. A Friend, Always By Wine's Side; 172. A Quiet Bloom in the Shade; 173. Softly Unfurling Wings of Blue; 174. The Wine Quintet Called Life; 175. Swept in the Great Wind of the Mainland; 176. The Pale Foe Lurking at the Great Table; 177. Connected to the "Land Beloved By God"; 178. Mediterranean Winds Easily Besting the Wall
19	December 22, 2008	978-4-06-372759-3	May 6, 2021 (digital)	9781646593064
179. A Simple Glance to Those Without Purpose; 180. The Strategist Stains a Holy Wedding; 181. Awakened from Slumber by a Loud Voice; 182. The Mariage Vividly Soars Upward; 183. The Dark of Night, Filled with Fragrant Orchids; 184. Happy Tears, Shed Out of Sight; 185. A Flower Swaying in Late Summer Winds.; 186. Reunions and Letters Always Come Suddenly; 187. Walking the Darkness, Enveloped by Eternal Void; 188. A Godlike Flame in the Faraway Night
20	March 23, 2009	978-4-06-372779-1	May 6, 2021 (digital)	9781646593071
189. A Mountain Sunset Framing Ancient Japan; 190. The Cold Akino Moon Above the Poem-Chasers; 191. Asuka's Horizon, Burning Red Underneath the Sky; 192. The Small, Brooding Maitreya; 193. For Whom Tears Are Shed.; 194. The Blue Moon Faintly Glints from Afar; 195. A Light Like a Will-o'-the-Wisp; 196. The Hand Reaches Out to One Puzzled Cheek; 197. Departing with a Profound Smile.; 198. Betting on a Beloved Trailblazer; 199. A Resolute Shadow Over the Young Strategist
21	August 21, 2009	978-4-06-372815-6	May 6, 2021 (digital)	9781646595419
200. Saint-Émilion, The Unchanging Light of Beauty; 201. The Bouquet Scatters to the Four Winds; 202. Strong, Yet Gentle Arms Around the Bride; 203. Wanderer in a 17th-Century Forest; 204. The Rival's Voice Wavers; 205. The Genius Boldly Raises His Right Hand; 206. The Untold Truth, All Found in Wine; 207. A Sudden Sea Breeze Rouses the Mermaid's Heart; 208. Turning a Moody Wine Toward You Anew; 209. A Reunion on the School Sports Field
22	November 13, 2009	978-4-06-372838-5	May 6, 2021 (digital)	9781646595426
210. Sentiments, Resentments-a Familial Battle for a New Apostle; 211. The People's Prayers and Wisdom Never Dying; 212. On a Journey to the Unknown I'll Take You; 213. A Genius' Fear Departed Beyond the Skies; 214. The Black Shadow Creeping Into a Tranquil Vineyard; 215. Pitch-Black Gunpoint and a Blue-Spark Roar; 216. In a Cask Shrouded in Deep Purple Smoke; 217. A New Hand Enrobed in an Inner Veil; 218. To Me, New World Flowers Blooming in Profusion; 219. Sunshine's Dazzling Smile and Heavy Brown Shadows
23	January 22, 2010	978-4-06-372849-1	October 20, 2020 (digital)	9781646595433
220. The Trees of Emerald Enmity Growing Triumphantly Lush; 221. What's in You, Scarlet Flames, an Evil Heart or a Virtuous Soul?; 222. A Comrade Shining on a Crimson Horizon in the Twilight; 223. Dreams Spoken of by a Flickering Mirage of Trees; 224.The Spire's Entrance in Unprecedented Serenity; 225. Those Who Walk Arm in Arm to Time's Score; 226. Awakening From a Century-Long Slumber to a Holy Dawn; 227. The Faint Aroma of Artistry of a Glass Wet with Tears; 228. Fight or Flight? A Raging Heart, Sparking with Spite; 229. Back Towards the Gentle Aroma of Yesteryear
24	March 23, 2010	978-4-06-372879-8	October 20, 2020 (digital)	9781646595440
230. Eternal Bonds Rooted in the Gironde's Banks; 231. Sweet Sorbets of Pauillac Bringing Insights to the Past; 232. The Speedster Awakens to a Lion's Boldness; 233. Saint-Julien's Healing Winds Fill a Warrior's Sails; 234. Young Man, Feel the Terroir and Walk the Stately Path; 235. The Princess Unlocks a 100-Year-Old Seal of Love; 236. The Winds of Saint-Estèphe Bring Rose-Colored Joy; 237. Expectant Blooms Illuminating the Roads of Bordeaux; 238. Thorny Fruits, Opening at Night to Liven the Room; 239. Surges of Passion, Flowing with Every Goodbye
25	August 23, 2010	978-4-06-372849-1	October 20, 2020 (digital)	9781646595457
240. May the Scent Bring Me the Terroir-Laden Winds; 241. Lend an Ear to the Whispers of the Shimmering Sky; 242:. Love Born in Silence Connects to Two Roads.; 243. Flames, Kindled on an Odyssey, Burn on in the Heart; 244. A Light Kiss to the You in My Memories; 245. Let Your Voice Soar in the Warmest of Welcomes; 246. A Cool Morning's Greeting, Like the Wings of an Angel; 247. Raising a Glass Beyond Two Rising Suns.; 248. White Bubbles Inviting You On to Hidden Memories; 249. Peace and Darkness Contrast in a Lemony Afternoon
26	November 5, 2010	978-4-06-372938-2	October 20, 2020 (digital)	9781646596683
250. The Wind and Leaves, Amid a Sepia-Toned Pulse; 251. The Lady with Golden Hair Enters My Gaze; 252. A Novel Soft Cheek, Greeted with Tidings of Pink; 253. Philosophy Taking Root and Nourishing the Heart; 254. Vestiges of a Past Lover from the White, Empty Sky; 255. An Unforgettable Glimmer, Sating Faithful Lips; 256. A Melody of Summer Birdsong by the Babbling Brook; 257. Für Élise; 258. The Banquet's Aroma, Suddenly Piercing the Skies; 259. Beyond a Clouded Conscious, The Crimson Light of Trust
27	December 22, 2010	978-4-06-372968-9	October 20, 2020 (digital)	9781646596751
260. Winds of Your Beloved, Lifting Pride-Woven Veils; 261. The Free, Mighty Tree Lifts Its Leaves Up to Heaven; 262. Bittersweet Shadows, Made by the Summer Sunset; 263. Two Marionettes, Cursing the Unbreakable Strings; 264. The Sun, Enclosed in Eternal Night, Is Reborn Anew; 265. Young Grass, Burning a Summer's Lifetime in the Afterglow; 266. An Eternal Flicker at the End of a Dreary Summer; 267. Shining Sparks, Carving Out Vibrant Life; 268. Sepia-Tone Treasures from a Distant, Nostalgic Home; 269. In Praise of the Beauty of Eons-Old Mountain Ranges
28	March 23, 2011	978-4-06-372988-7	October 20, 2020 (digital)	9781646596768
270 A Young Tree's Dreams of Paradise Spread Across Fields of Passion; 271. An Unforgettable, Elegant Night, Still Blooming in My Hand; 272. A Holy Hunt, Driven by Silence, Bearing Fruits Beyond; 273. A Quiet Nocturne from a Set of Pure Fingers; 274. Your Baptism of Wisdom, Salvation for Bitter Fools; 275. From Bitter Seeds Come the Sweet Buds of Spring; 276. The Sun Touches the Eastern Sky, Blazing in a Day of Revelation; 277. Through Hot, Dusty Lands, to the Land Between Moon and Sun; 278. The Incessant Cavalcade of Trickery, Between Friendship and Invasion; 279. Multi-hued Gospels, with Bewitching Noise, from the Wellspring
29	June 23, 2011	978-4-06-387005-3	October 20, 2020 (digital)	9781646596775
280. The Freed Child Sings Over Distant Castle Walls; 281. The Awe-Inspiring Light of Three Suns on the Land; 282. The Lustrous Bloom Connects Across Two Capitals; 283. Light, Dark, and Swirling Winds Split Paths; 284. A Jester's Earnestness Under the Laughs and Tears; 285. A Decadent Aphrodisiac, or a Stirring Miracle Cure?; 286. The Shining Elixir, and Wailing Dregs, of Wine; 287. Aching Wounds Between Memory and Oblivion; 288. Particles in the Mirage of a "Cool" Dream; 289. A Mariage Reddening the Sun on the Road
30	September 23, 2011	978-4-06-387045-9	October 20, 2020 (digital)	9781646596782
290. The Dreams of Champions, Running with Past Flames in Tow; 291. Red-Hot Passions in a Cruel World of White; 292. A Moonlight Goddess Making the Setting Sun Shine; 293. Melancholy Waters, as the Wind Fills Your Sails; 294. Press On, Past the Horizon, to the Sage's Mountain; 295. Delicate Sounds, Woven by a Born Master; 296. A Young Tree, Glistened by Ashen Fog and Azure Dew; 297. Heaven Smiles Only Upon Traversing Tear-Lined Trails; 298. A Paradise that Opens After Days-Long Faith; 299. Ripples Turn Into Waves in the Spring of Knowledge
31	November 17, 2011	978-4-06-387064-0	October 20, 2020 (digital)	9781646596799
300. Indomitable Passion and Force, in a City of Hope; 301. Sudden Tidings from a Small, Open Window; 302. A Small Wildflower, Sweetly Tilting Forward; 303. The Sweet Aromas of Home, Poured Into the Spring of Tomorrow; 304. A Small, Persistent Dream Blessed with Summer's Light; 305. The Pilgrim-Blessing Angel, Wings Struck by Lightning; 306. Eternal Thoughts, Painted on a Red Canvas at Midnight; 307. The Young Lion, Polishing His Fangs in the Bottomless Valley; 308. Which to Take: The Cup of Glory, or of Solitude?; 309. A Chill Summer Wine Through the Gates of Glory
32	February 23, 2012	978-4-06-387084-8	October 20, 2020 (digital)	9781646596805
310. A Glass of Reminisces, Lost in a Forest of Sentiment; 311. A Melodic Duet Echoing Across the Beautiful Heights; 312. A White-Walled Maze, Lost Amid Infinite Stardust; 313. Sepia-Toned Thoughts Before an Explosive Soul; 314. Live Your Inscrutable Life, Though the Road May Vanish; 315. Encounters in Blue Waves, Memories in Faint Place; 316. Red Robes Waver Atop the Solemn Hill of the Cross; 317. Village Wisdom, Dyed in the Colors of the Harvest.; 318. A Great Blue Illusion, and an All-Black Reflection; 319. A Beautiful Lost Bird, Moved by a White Ring
33	May 23, 2012	978-4-06-387107-4	October 20, 2020 (digital)	9781646597284
320. The Grandeur of Japan, Seen Through a Fragrant Sea; 321. A Samurai Proudly Choosing Shields over Lances; 322. The Great Hand Speaks of the Earth and Trees' Secrets; 323. Dazzling Figures, Similar but Never Meeting; 324. The Song of Deep, Long Roots, Seen from Inside1; 325. The Samurai Sees the Sky, Gauging the Way Ahead; 326. Escape the Restive Paradise and Seek New Lands; 327. Sinking Deep Into the Charms of Dark Beauty; 328. The Stark Tactical Balance Between Life and Death; 329. Valiant Survivors, Gather in the Halls of Judgment
34	August 23, 2012	978-4-06-387134-0	May 18, 2021 (digital)	9781646597314
330. The Blue Spring in the Darkness Reflects Warm Light; 331. The Quiet of a Resting Sea, Embraced by Clear Skies; 332. Let the Poem of Hope Echo Across Light and Dark; 333. Ridges Taller than Mountains, Blessing the Chosen; 334. Like Two Unique Stars, Diverging for Eternity; 335. Casting Two Shadows Under a Long-Missed Sun; 336. The Sun's Blessings Light Up a Warm Heart; 337. A Sunny Veranda, Energized by a Nostalgic Figure; 338. In a Field Never Tilting, East or West; 339. Flying Rumors Invite a Nearby Home to Oblivion
35	November 22, 2012	978-4-06-387156-2	May 18, 2021 (digital)	9781646597321
340. A Calm, Dignified Flower In the Frigid Air; 341. A Deep Scarlet Reflecting on the Rare Genius's Way; 342. A Fleeting Beauty Under the Dazzling Blooms; 343. Lured by a Bewitching Devil in a Ravine; 344. A Kiss to the Flickering Flames of Memory; 345. Multi-hued Seeds, Sensing a Sprouting Duet; 346. The Flowers of Spring Tinting the Fields Pink; 347. A Cup with the Spirit of a Hero; 348. A Silvery Moon; a Lantern-Lit Night; 349. A Sword of Onyx, Released From Its Scabbard
36	February 22, 2013	978-4-06-387188-3	May 18, 2021 (digital)	9781646597338
350. The Cup of the Sun Plays a Melodic Rondo; 351. Psychologies of Time and Earth; 352. Flickering Light and Shadow, Over a Song of Wind; 353. Man, Run the Fields; Blooms, Color the Fields; 354. Winds Across a Pond Shake Sunbeams and Couples; 355. The Classic, Enjoyed Over Wine; 356. Unexpected Companions, the Guides of Bacchus; 357. Surging Seas of Gold, Fading Into Darkness; 358. The Sweet, Aromatic Beacon of Aged Wine; 359. Daydreams Catching a Rising Gust of Wind
37	April 23, 2013	978-4-06-387204-0	May 18, 2021 (digital)	9781646597345
360. Shining Bubbles Growing Above the Clouds; 361. The Best of Memories, the Worst of Recollections; 362 For Whom the Glass Rises; 363. The Princess Awakens from a Long, Deep Sleep; 364. The Evening Sun Gently Illuminates the Couple; 365. Winds of Innovation Blowing Across a Nation; 366. In Search of a Wandering Sunset; 367. Silhouettes of Happiness, Growing Ever Darker; 368. Lend an Ear to the Story the Drink Tells; 369. A Game of Sunsets
38	June 21, 2013	978-4-06-387221-7	May 18, 2021 (digital)	9781646597352
370. The Story Changes Expression with Each Retelling; 371. Firm Crimson Buds, Falling like Silk Thread; 372. Sunset Over Granada; 373. White Moonlight Shines on the Workings of Life; 374. Time and Life, The Truth of All Space; 375. The Fog Lifts with the Sunrise; 376. The Spirit of Wine Sings a Song of Hope; 377. Set Sail for the Stairs of the World; 378. The Hero Flies as Far as His Wings Will Take Him; 379. The Glass of Victory, Basking in the Afterglow
39	September 20, 2013	978-4-06-387247-7	May 18, 2021 (digital)	9781646597369
380. A Hazy Sun and a Gust of Wind; 381. The Puppeteer Looks Into the Distance and Laughs; 382. Two Dreams in One Bottle; 383. After Many Years, the Trees Express the Land; 384. A Movable Wine Feast; 385. The Shining of the Stars Heralds a New Ripening; 386. White Lands Rearing a Clear, Classic Drink.; 387. The Student Overcomes the Master; 388. Poems of Mountains, Winds, and Earth; 389. The Beauty Lets Her Hair Hang Down
40	November 22, 2013	978-4-06-387268-2	May 18, 2021 (digital)	9781646597376
390. The Glittering Hall's Roots Come to the Surface; 391. Great Japanese Wine Expands Social Rings; 392. A Tough Father's Elegance, a Gentle Mother's Kindness; 393. The Eternal Milky Way; 394. Wine Builds Bedrock; Time Breeds Maturity; 395. The Shining God's Seat Appears Over the Ages; 396. A Rest in the Kaleidoscope Maze; 397. A Strange Story Woven by Time; 398. The Magic of Time Runs Across Landscapes; 399. At Times, Like a Flower-Selling Girl
41	February 21, 2014	978-4-06-387293-4	May 18, 2021 (digital)	9781646597383
400. The God of Time Oversees the Ancient Manor; 401. The Pair's Faces, Tinged in a Deep Crimson; 402.The Corridor Reveals a Rainbow of Visages; 403. The Lady Sings of the Joy of Togetherness; 404. A Ruby-Tinged Decision; 405. Encounter in the Fog; 406. The Sad Solution to the Riddle; 407. The Light Illuminates the Mist-Shrouded Path; 408. Gazing at You; 409. The Equivalent Exchange of Time
42	May 23, 2014	978-4-06-388322-0	May 18, 2021 (digital)	9781646597390
410. The Frame of a Lifetime; 411. The Gold-Tinged Indiscretion; 412. The Grape Badge; 413. Rain Coloring the Reunion; 414. The Umbrellas of Cherbourg; 415. The Poppies Speak; 416. The Phantom Label; 417. A Heart Full of Love; 418. What Is Only Understood Now; 419. Memories Melting Into the Night Sky
43	June 23, 2014	978-4-06-388339-8	May 18, 2021 (digital)	9781646597406
420. Beside You; 421. The Moldy Label; 422. The Storehouse that Locked In Time Itself; 423. All Too Enormous; 424. The Long and Winding Road; 425. The Two Rivers; 426. An Ode to Life; 427. Another Journey to Maturity; 428. The Final Present; 429. Tonight, Wine with Us All
44	July 23, 2014	978-4-06-388349-7	May 18, 2021 (digital)	9781646597413
430: The Apostle's Melody; 431: The River's Eternal Surface; 432: A Great and Mighty Chaos; 433: The Brothers' Performance; 434: The Arrogant Man; 435: A Tacit Understanding; 436: The Successors; 437: The Happiest Night in the World; 438: The Revelation; 439: Time for Departure

==== Drops of God: Mariage ====
Drops of God: Mariage (マリアージュ ～神の雫 最終章～, Mariage - Kami no Shizuku Saishūshō) began serialization on May 28, 2015, a few months after the original manga ended its serialization, and concluded on October 15, 2020, with its chapters collected into a total of 26 tankōbon volumes. On August 31, 2023, Kodansha USA revealed they have licensed the sequel, with the first volume initially to be released digitally on September 26, 2023, but was pushed back to October 3 of the same year.

No.	Original release date	Original ISBN	English release date	English ISBN
1	October 23, 2015	978-4-06-388537-8	October 3, 2023 (digital)	978-1-68-491784-6
1. The Two Shops (二つの店); 2. Wine Without Fault (ワインに罪なし); 3. Narita Divorce (成田離婚); 4. A Happy Mariage (幸せな結婚); 5. Two Mariages (二つのマリアージュ); 6. The Final Mariage (最後のマリアージュ); 7. The Promised Day (約束の日); 8. The Order of the Drops of God (神の雫騎士団)
2	January 22, 2016	978-4-06-388552-1	October 24, 2023 (digital)	9781684917853
9. Classic Ingredients (王道食材); 10. A Race Against Time (時間との戦い); 11. Mariage with Blue Cheese (ブルーチーズとのマリアージュ); 12. Mariage with Hard Cheesee (ハードチーズとのマリアージュ); 13. The Family and the Old house (古い家と家族); 14. Mariage of the Sea of Remembrance (追憶の海のマリアージュ); 15. Memories of Yutaka Kanzaki (神咲豊多香の追憶); 16. A Perfect Mariage (完璧なマリアージュ); 17. A Godlike Mariage (神のマリアージュ); 18. Qualifications Test (資格審査); 19. To Each His Own Mariage (それぞれのマリアージュ)
3	April 22, 2016	978-4-06-388585-9	November 28, 2023 (digital)	9781684917860
20. The Most Basic of Fundamentals (「基本の基」); 21. Mama-Miya's Challenge (「ママミーヤ」の挑戦); 22. Mariage with Curry (カレーとのマリアージュ); 23. The Formidable Romaneya (難敵「ロマネ屋」); 24. Three Weddings (三種のマリアージュ); 25. Marriage of Aromas (香りのマリアージュ); 26. Secret Weapon for Victor (勝利の秘密兵器); 27. The Final Showdown's Theme (決勝戦のテーマ); 28. A Little Ingenuity (少しの工夫); Special End-of-Book Appendix; Tadashi Agi's Post-Book Marriage; Even a Dog Can Understand! Glossary for All Things Mariage; Wedding Wine List
4	July 22, 2016	978-4-06-388621-4	December 26, 2023 (digital)	9781684917877
29: Father and Son (父と子); 30: The Smiling Goddess of Harvest (微笑む豊穣の女神); 31. The Magic of Time (時がかける魔法); 32. Kamoshida's Feelings (鴨志田の想い); 33. Working the Edomae Sushi (江戸前寿司の『仕事』); 34. The Showdown Commences (戦闘開始); 35. All in Accord (呼応するものたち); 36. A Father's Parting Gift (父の置き土産); 37. Transcending Space and Time (時空を超えるもの)
5	October 21, 2016	978-4-06-388649-8	January 30, 2024 (digital)	9781684917884
38. Battle for Supremacy (拮抗するバトル); 39. Conger Eel Clash (穴子対決); 40. From Father to Son (父から子へ); 41. An Unexpected Development (まさかの綻び); 42. Angoulême's Dignity (アングレームの矜持); 43. Mama-Miya Vs. Bistro 9 (ママミーヤ VS. ビストロ9); 44. The Crowning of the Champion (王者決定！); 45. Shizuku's Choice (雫の決断); 46. The French Way (フレンチの流儀)
6	January 23, 2017	978-4-06-388683-2	April 23, 2024 (digital)	9781684917891
47. A New Battle Looms (新たな戦いの兆し); 48. An Extraordinarily Experimental Wine (前代未聞の“実験”ワイン); 49. The Contest for Four Clues (四枚の争奪戦); 50. Entrance (前菜); 51. True Ratatouille (本当の「ラタトゥイユ」); 52. The Ingredients' Feelings (素材の「気持ち」); 53. Set Sail for a New Battle (戦いへの船出); 54. The Second Challenge (第2の課題); 55. III-Tempered Champagne (不機嫌なシャンパーニュ)
7	April 21, 2017	978-4-06-388714-3	July 9, 2024 (digital)	9781684917907
56. A Spécialité for Him (彼のためのスペシャリテ); 57. The Familiar Scent of a Beloved Hometown (懐かしき故郷の香り); 58. French Tradition (王道のフレンチ); 59. Chef Mikasa's Braise (三笠シェフの「ブレゼ」); 60. A True Meunière (本当の「ムニエル」); 61. The World Wine Expo (世界ワイン博覧会); 62. The True Merit of International Wines (各国ワイン その個性と実力); 63. A Miraculous Wedding (マリアージュの奇跡); 64. Rôti d'Agneau de Pré Salé (プレ・サレ仔羊のロースト)
8	July 21, 2017	978-4-06-510045-5	September 24, 2024 (digital)	9781684917914
65. A New Meeting; 66. Suddenly Reunited; 67. A Gâteau au Chocolat; 68. The Art of the Pâtissier; 69. The Perfect Mariage; 70. At the Reims Cathedral; 71. The Meaning of "La Vie en Rose"; 72. Departure from Paris; 73. Solemn Start to a Noble Battle
9	October 23, 2017	978-4-06-510277-0	November 24, 2024 (digital)	9781684917921
74. Precious Little Memories; 75. Victor of the First Round; 76. The Second Course; 77. Sensuous Champagne; 78. The Curtain Rises; 79. A Supreme Glass; 80. A Glass Held High; 81. The Fabulous Fourth Course; 82. A Chance Encounter in the Past
10	November 22, 2017	978-4-06-510515-3	December 10, 2024 (digital)	9781684917938
83. A Stream of Tears; 84. The Final Dish and the Final Wine; 85. The Conclusion of the Fourth Course; 86. The Last Page; 87. Challenging Chinese Cuisine; 88. The Foibles of Food Sites; 89. A Trip to Terzo; 90. Shizuku's Decision; 91. Comeback Plan
11	January 23, 2018	978-4-06-510736-2	March 18, 2025 (digital)	9781684917945
92. The Secret Weapon; 93. Wine Consultant; 94. Wine for Lunch; 95. Yashiki's Resolve; 96. Bistecca alla Fiorentina; 97. Dinnertime; 98. Misaki's Quick Thinking; 99. A Girl Could Only Dream; 100. Scenery Yet Unseen
12	April 23, 2018	978-4-06-511228-1	April 22, 2025 (digital)	9781684917952
101. A Menu for a Reunion; 102. A Powerful Teammate; 103. Our Summer; 104. Maturity and Trust; 105. The Hometown Couple; 106. An Invitation to Chinese Cuisine; 107. A Treasure Trove of Ingredients; 108. Classical Beijing Bites; 109. The Imperial Mariage
13	July 23, 2018	978-4-06-511896-2	June 24, 2025 (digital)	9781684917969
110. Spice and Numbness; 111. A Tough Customer; 112. Shanghai Menu; 113. Wine of Hospitality; 114. Wine of the River and Forest; 115. A Wine of Alabaster Sand; 116. Far East Spice; 117. Maturation and Decline; 118. The Freezing Connection
14	October 23, 2018	978-4-06-513094-0	January 27, 2026 (digital)	9781684917976
119. Two Mapo Tofus; 120. A Treasure Box of Aromas; 121. Chinese Terroir; 122. Yin and Yang; 123. Terroir of Tofu; 124. A Seductive Rosé; 125. A Most Unpleasant Encounter; 126. The Wine Within the Haze; 127. The Challenge of Gypsum Tofu
15	November 22, 2018	978-4-06-513464-1	January 27, 2026 (digital)	9781684917983
128. An Altocumulus Cloud of Flavor; 129. Two Chefs; 130. Phantasmal Embrace; 131. Echoes in the Underground Cellar; 132. Golden Shark Fin; 133. The Price of Shark Fin; 134. The "Taste" of Shark Fin; 135. A Shockingly Bad Mariage; 136. The Green Connection
16	January 23, 2019	978-4-06-514140-3	—	—
17	April 23, 2019	978-4-06-514969-0	—	—
18	July 23, 2019	978-4-06-516559-1	—	—
19	October 23, 2019	978-4-06-517638-2	—	—
20	November 21, 2019	978-4-06-517828-7	—	—
21	January 23, 2020	978-4-06-518154-6	—	—
22	April 23, 2020	978-4-06-518998-6	—	—
23	July 20, 2020	978-4-06-520237-1	—	—
24	October 23, 2020	978-4-06-520910-3	—	—
25	November 20, 2020	978-4-06-521230-1	—	—
26	December 23, 2020	978-4-06-521579-1	—	—

==== Drops of God deuxième ====
Another sequel manga, titled Drops of God deuxième (神の雫 deuxième, Kami no Shizuku deuxième), began serialization in Weekly Morning magazine on September 21, 2023, and concluded on April 18, 2024, into a total of 2 tankōbon volumes.

No.	Original release date	Original ISBN	English release date	English ISBN
1	March 22, 2024	978-4-06-534786-7	—	—
2	May 22, 2024	978-4-06-535466-7	—	—

=== Live-action TV series ===
==== 2008 Korean TV series project ====
In 2008, a Korean adaptation was in the works, with actor Bae Yong-joon (who the Kibayashi siblings modeled character Issei after) expressing interested in it, but ultimately fell through and was never greenlit.

==== 2009 Japanese TV series ====
A live action television adaptation, also titled Kami no Shizuku, was broadcast on Nippon TV in January 2009.

==== 2023 multinational TV series ====
On August 24, 2021, a multinational, multi-lingual TV series was announced as a co-production between Legendary Television, Dynamic Television, France Télévisions and Nippon TV-owned Hulu Japan, in partnership with Adline Entertainment, with Legendary Television handling worldwide sales for all territories apart from France and Japan. Apple TV+ picked up streaming rights for the series which consisted of two seasons, with Season 1 aired in 2023 and Season 2 aired in 2026.

=== Anime ===
An anime television series adaptation was announced by Pony Canyon on November 20, 2025. It is produced by Satelight and directed by Kenji Itoso, with Yū Mitsuru writing and supervising scripts, Takehiro Suwa designing the characters, and Eishi Segawa composing the music. The series aired from April 10 to September 18, 2026, on Tokyo MX and other networks. For the first cours, the opening theme song is "hate you? love you?" performed by Hokuto Yoshino, while the ending theme song is "Kami no Shizuku" (カミノシズク) performed by Maaya Uchida. For the second cours, the opening theme song is "Call Me Asap" performed by Super Dragon, while the ending theme song is "Every Summer" (エブリー・サマー) performed by Eill. Crunchyroll streamed the series. Tropics Entertainment licensed the series in Southeast Asia for streaming on Tropics Anime Asia YouTube channel.

==== Episodes ====
No.	Title	Directed by (Note: Production staff information is taken from the ending credits of each episode.)	Written by	Storyboard by	Original release date
1	"The Beginning of All Battles"; Transliteration: "Subete no Tatakai no Hajimari ni" (Japanese: すべての闘いのはじまりに)	Ryō Miyata	Yū Mitsuru	Kenji Itoso	April 10, 2026
Taiyoh Beer company salesman Shizuku insists he knows nothing about wines, despite being son of world-famous wine expert Yutaka Kanzaki. Yutaka suddenly dies from illness. Meeting Yutaka's lawyer Kiryu, Shizuku learns Yutaka adopted wine critic Tomine Issei. According to Yutaka's will Shizuku and Tomine must identify the name, year and manufacturer of 12 wines he personally selected, including a 13th he deemed greatest in the world, the Drops of God. Whoever wins inherits his ¥12Billion wine collection. Shizuku considers this unfair against the expert Tomine. They are presented with a bottle of wine and asked to describe its nature; with whoever does best being allowed to live in Yutaka's mansion during the contest. Shizuku's friend Miyabi, an apprentice sommelier, discovers Shizuku actually inherited Yutaka's incredible sense of smell, and that Shizuku's childhood memories all relate to Yutaka teaching him about wine without realising it. While practicing with Miyabi and her mentor Shiro, Miyabi breaks a bottle of Cros-Parantoux, one of only 700 bottles by vintner Henri Jayer which Shiro acquired for CEO Mishima as part of his negotiations with wine merchant Guillemard. Mishima fires Miyabi and her boss Morikubo. To save their jobs, Shizuku claims he can replace Cros-Parantoux, even though he may not take anything from Yutaka's collection before winning the contest.
2	"Prayers to a Fragrant Land"; Transliteration: "Hōjōnaru Daichi e no Inori" (Japanese: 豊穣なる大地への祈り)	Kandai Sudō	Yū Mitsuru	Hidekazu Satō	April 17, 2026
Trying similar wines Shizuku is impressed by a Les-Beaumonts by Rouget, Jayer's nephew, but notes it is not a perfect replacement. Shiro introduces him to elderly wine expert Robert Doi who is fascinated by their story and gives them a bottle from his collection. Guillemard arrives for her meeting with Mishima and it is revealed Cros-Parantoux was the wine they drank when dating 15 years ago, but Guillemard had to leave him for an arranged marriage. Robert's bottle is revealed to be Cros-Parantoux made by Jayer in his later years after giving ownership of his vineyard to Rouget. After Guillemard leaves Shizuku urges Mishima to follow her, since Guillemard is now divorced but it is obvious she is losing her sense of taste to a brain tumour. Grateful to Shizuku, Mishima follows Guillemard. Shizuku attends the contest for Yutaka's mansion and is shocked the judge is Robert, Yutaka's oldest friend. Tomine describes the wine as the painting Angelus by Millet, embodying the earthiness of the soil. Shizuku describes it as a loving goodbye, as the grapes came from Bordeaux where he last hugged his mother before her death in 1982. The wine is revealed as a 1982 Château Mouton Rothschild. Unfortunately, by the rules of the contest Robert declares Tomine the winner. Tomine is shocked Shizuku only wants the rest of the Rothschild bottle. Shizuku warns Tomine he will discover Yutaka's message behind the Drops of God.
3	"Thus Spoke the Will"; Transliteration: "Yuigonjō wa Kaku Katariki" (Japanese: 遺言状はかく語りき)	Fumihiro Ueno	Yū Mitsuru	Masayoshi Nishida	April 24, 2026
Shizuku asks his boss to transfer him to Taiyoh Beer's new wine department with manager Kawarage and his assistant Kawamata, who are happy to support Shizuku in his contest. Shizuku reads Yutaka's will and learns Yutaka named the wines his Twelve Apostles. Kiryu reads the description of the first Apostle to Shizuku and Tomine at the same time. The clue references a spring in a forest with the scent of fruits and flowers and violet butterflies. Tomine immediately guesses the country of origin but is unsure of the name and year. Shizuku is certain there are more clues hidden in the education Yutaka gave him as a child. Miyabi and Kawarage believe it is a Pinot noir from Burgundy, with Mishima suggesting vineyards in the Côte de Nuits region. By chance Shizuku passes an art gallery with a painting of violet butterflies over water in a forest. The artist, Mizusawa kaori, admits she painted it after tasting a particular wine, but due to a bout of amnesia she can't remember the name. The only thing she has is the name Kaori engraved on an engagement ring she was wearing when she lost her memories. Shizuku guesses the ring was a gift from a wine expert and that Yutaka meant for Shizuku to meet Kaori. Despite her current husband's concern, Kaori asks Shizuku to help her remember.
4	"Made by the Hand of Man"; Transliteration: "Hito no Tsukuri Shimo no" (Japanese: 人の造りしもの)	Ryō Miyata	Yū Mitsuru	Takaaki Ishiyama & Kandai Sudō	May 1, 2026
Kaori recognises Burgundy wines, with Shizuku identifying it as a 1999 Chambolle-Musigny wine. Tomine confirms where the 1st Apostle's grapes were grown. Musician Makabe visits the restaurant for the perfect Chambolle-Musigny to mourn his deceased wife, the 1999 vintage. Shizuku finds the scent is close enough to Yutaka's description to identify the 1st Apostle without tasting it. Mishima is surprised as Shizuku's choice is far from the perfection of the 1999. Kaori tries the 1999 and remembers it was one she and her fiancé drank when he proposed. That same day her fiancé drowned in the accident that made her amnesiac. Satisfied, Kaori has dinner with her relieved husband. Model Sarah is hired to represent Taiyoh Beer. She is surprised Shizuku claims to have found the 1st Apostle, and secretly informs Tomine. Tomine submits the perfect 1999 but realises he made a mistake as it evokes Adam and Eve in the Garden of Eden, not butterflies. Shizuku submits an inferior 2001 and Robert declares Shizuku the winner, as Yutaka believed imperfect wines were more interesting. Robert explains 1999 was a perfect grape growing year when God alone made the perfect Chambolle-Musigny, but the 2001 weather was poor so vintner Christopher Roumier had to work hard to produce good wine, like an Apostle seeking God.
5	"The Strange Man From the Wine Division"; Transliteration: "Wain Jigyōbu no Kaijin" (Japanese: ワイン事業部の怪人)	Rei Satō	Yū Mitsuru	Rei Satō	May 8, 2026
Chosuke transfers to the Wine Department with a fanatical preference for Italian wine over French. Miyabi suggests a contest between the two. Shizuku encounters Watanuki, unhappy owner of Ma Famille restaurant. Watanuki explains Tomine previously gave him a bad review for his wine/food pairings, and now Tomine is returning to review him again. Watanuki’s daughter Suzuka blames him for serving random expensive wines while ignoring the wines his sommelier wife chose before she died. Seeing the wines, Shizuku urges Watanuki to trust his wife. Tomine is impressed with the new pairings and gives a better review, so Watanuki asks Suzuka to be Ma Famille’s sommelier. Shizuku loses Round 1 to Chosuke, noting Chosuke’s Contrada Di Concenigo from Colli Di Conegliano is good from the bottle, but his 2001 Saint Cosme from Côtes du Rhône required decanting first. For Round 2 Shizuku offers 2001 Marsanny Les Sampagny from Domaine Lecheneaut while Chosuke chooses 2000 Canneto D’Angelo from Basilicata. Having learned the decanter method, Shizuku wins Round 2. For Round 3 Chosuke presents Roggio Del Filare from Marche. Tomine interrupts, certain Chosuke has won with Roggio. However, Chosuke happily admits Roggio was defeated by Shizuku’s Grand Cru Classe Margaux from Bordeaux. Tomine notes Shizuku’s wines chosen by Watanuki’s wife all complemented each other, so he won on presentation over quality. Elsewhere, a man connected to Taiyoh Beer is unimpressed with the Wine Department.
6	"Bring Back the Smile From That Day"; Transliteration: "Ano Hi no Egao o Mōichido" (Japanese: あの日の笑顔をもう一度)	Maki Kamiya	Mitsuho Seta	Masayoshi Nishida	May 15, 2026
Takasugi, Miyabi's rich former classmates, asks Taiyoh Beer for wines for his new supermarket from the five best Château's; Lafite, Margaux, Latour, Haut-Brion and Mouton. Shizuku points out there are better tasting wines. Takasugi insists all wines are the same and he only wants the famous brands. Miyabi suggests taste testing better wines. Takasugi demands wine superior to Château Margaux, and if they fail Miyabi must work at his supermarket. Miyabi admits Takasugi was her first crush due to his shy smile, but now his family is rich she can't stand his arrogance. She contacts other former classmates, twins Kenya and Junya, who also run a wine bar. The twin's father, Ishikawa, is fascinated by Takasugi's challenge and offers them a bottle. Shizuku deduces the wine is an expired cheap Bordeaux, but Ishikawa reveals it is actually a 1984 Château Lafite, a bad year for grapes, reminding them famous Château's can still produce bad wines. Miyabi realises they can win by comparing a bad Margaux from a good year with a good wine from the same year from a less famous Château. Shizuku visits Tomine for help. Tomine presents him Château Margaux 1970 and 1978, both good years, and promises to help if Shizuku answers a riddle.
7	"The Pegasus in the Heavens"; Transliteration: "Toki o Kakeru Tenba" (Japanese: 時を駆ける天馬)	Ryō Miyata	Mitsuho Seta	Toshiharu Sato	May 22, 2026
Tomine asks the difference between the wines. Shizuku realises the 1970 is poor because Margeaux let their standards fall. In 1977 the new owners hired Enologist Paul Pontallier, who produced the superior 1978. For answering the riddle, Tomine provides a bad Margeaux from 1975. Robert gives Shizuku a letter to the Japan Wine School to sample leftover wines, but none are a superior 1975. Takasugi invites Miyabi to dinner and chooses a 2000 Margeaux just for the price. Miyabi is disappointed he didn’t use a decanter, leaving the wine bitter. By chance, Shizuku finds the perfect wine at Shiro’s bar. Takasugi and his lawyers are disappointed by Shizuku’s selection and insist he lost. Miyabi insists Takasugi try the second wine and Takasugi is transported to the past when he was poor but had many friends. Shizuku reveals the bad wine was the Margeaux, while the superior wine was Château Chasse-Spleen, whose brand ranks far below the five great Château’s. Takasugi admits after his family became rich; he started dating a rich girl. For her birthday he gave her a watch, but she humiliated him because it was not a designer brand. Afterwards, he became obsessed with brands, but now realises his mistake. He admits Shizuku won and decides to start learning about wines. Tomine puts his own wine collection into storage, having realised to defeat Shizuku he must change his approach to enjoying wine.
8	"A Smile That's Mysterious"; Transliteration: "Hohoemi wa Misuteriasu" (Japanese: 微笑みはミステリアス)	Fukutarō Takahashi	Mitsuho Seta	Junichi Sakata	May 29, 2026
Kiryu reveals the 2nd Apostle riddle. An artist possesses two identical Mona Lisa’s; the left in Spring after conceiving a child, and the right in Summer. Yutaka claims he loved the left more. Tomine informs his sponsor/lover Maki he has not drunk wine in a week to increase his desire. He then leaves to travel the Taklamakan Desert. Shizuku and Miyabi meet author Maiko, who was sent a bottle of wine with a black label. A letter from Bacchus, God of wine, challenges her to identify what the right hands of newborn Gods reveal, or she will not survive. Shizuku samples the wine and sees the Mona Lisa before being painted. Tomine encounters desert nomads, including the half-Japanese Loulan. Miyabi gifts Maiko a 2002 Margaux, which she rejects as she never drinks Second wines; made from grapes not good enough for a first wine; the Grand Vin. Maiko’s wine collection are all Grand Vin, except for one Second. Nikaido, Chief Editor from Maiko’s publisher, believes the letter is a prank. Shizuku deduces Maiko and Nikaido are in a secret relationship. Maiko’s Second is the same as the Bacchus bottle; 2000 Alter Ego from Château Palmer. Kawarage provides a Palmer Grand Vin, which repulses Shizuku, yet he can sense the 2nd Apostle beyond the flavour. Bandits attack the nomads, forcing Tomine and Loulan to escape. At Maiko’s party Shizuku has Alter Ego served to see if the guests can solve Bacchus’ riddle. Maiko becomes ill, with Shizuku suspecting poison.
9	"A Smile That's Refreshing and Healing"; Transliteration: "Uruoi to Iyashi no Hohoemi ni" (Japanese: 潤いと癒しの微笑みに)	Madoka Yaguchi	Mitsuho Seta	Takaaki Ishiyama	June 5, 2026
The hospital confirms poisoning, which is killing Maiko's unborn baby, so as the father Nikaido is given the option to abort it. After waking up Maiko blames Bacchus for poisoning her. However, Shizuku deduces Maiko poisoned herself. During the freezing desert night Tomine collapses by old ruins, so Loulan keeps him warm. Maiko confesses she planned to abort her baby as Nikaido already has a wife and son. She invented the Bacchus poisoning so Nikaido would learn about the baby when she miscarried, which he would not suspect she was responsible for. Shizuku reveals Nikaido refused the abortion, so Maiko decides to raise the baby herself. Loulan reveals she miraculously found a bottle in the ruins, 2000 Silk Road Loulan, a wine from Loulan Kingdom on the Silk Road, sating Tomine's desperate thirst for wine. Tomine and Loulan become lovers and he discovers she has a sense of smell suited to a sommelier, so he invites her to Japan. At the Second Apostle tasting Tomine chooses 2000 Château Palmer Alter Ego Grand Vin, but on tasting it sees only Mona Lisa in summer, not the pregnant Monas Lisa in spring. Tomine explains this is a Cépage Trap, where a second wine uses different grapes than the Grand Vin of the same year. Therefore, the Second Apostle is 1999 Château Palmer. Tomine is declared winner, and he warns Shizuku to expand his knowledge.
10	"In the Great Flow of Time"; Transliteration: "Ōinaru Toki no Nagare o" (Japanese: 大いなる時の流れを)	Fumihiro Ueno	Yū Mitsuru	Yukie Yamamoto & Yomotsu Hirasaka	June 12, 2026
The Wine Division gets another new employee, Kido, who does not like alcohol. Deciding to convince him, Shizuku and Miyabi visit Murakoshi, a custodian looking after Yutaka's wine collection. He helps Shizuku recall the first wine he ever wanted to try was 2001 Échezeaux Domaine de la Romanée-Conti, so he lets Kido taste wine using grapes from the same field, but by a different vintner, 2001 Échezeaux Grande Cru Vincent Girardin. Kido loves it so much he decides to learn about wine. Loulan begins working for Tomine, but is not welcomed by his female employees. For the Third Apostle, Yutaka describes loneliness, the beginning of summer, food cooking, and a stranger guiding a lost child home. Loulan senses she might have already tasted the flavour. Mishima senses Yutaka is trying to teach them about nostalgia. Miyabi agrees, as her nostalgic wine is 1982 Château Branaire-Ducru, which inspired her sommelier career. Robert sends Shizuku to Kurokawa, director of Sara's next movie. Kurokawa provides 1970 Château Pétrus Grand Vin, which also feels nostalgic. Murakoshi directs them to Tomioka, who provides Châteauneuf-du-Pape AOC from Château de Beaucastel, a Vieilles Vignes of new grapes from old vines, mixing the present with the past. Shizuku realises the Third Apostle must be a Vieilles Vignes. Tomine feeds Loulan sweets until she finds the right flavour. Shizuku and Tomine present their chosen wines to Robert.
11	"A Large Hand Met in a Nostalgic Place"; Transliteration: "Kyōshū no Basho de Deatta Ōkina te" (Japanese: 郷愁の場所で出会った大きな手)	Kandai Sudō	Yū Mitsuru	Kandai Sudō	June 19, 2026
Shizuku presents 2000 Domaine Santa Duc Gigondas, but realises the nostalgia Yutaka described is absent. Tomine presents 1981 Château de Beaucastel Châteauneuf-du-Pape but realises it does not feel like nostalgia either. Robert declares them both failures, as Tomine's recent avoidance of wine has robbed him of his taste, and Shizuku lost confidence in himself. Robert gives them three days to find the Third Apostle or he will end the contest. Shizuku is convinced the Apostle uses Grenache grapes from vines at least 100 years old. Tomine is plagued by visions of himself as elderly. Shizuku visits Takasugi and is drawn to a sculpture in his supermarket made of wine corks, one of which is the Apostle. Tomine visits an amusement park and spends hours on the rides. Shizuku visits Mao, granddaughter of artist Fuse, who recently suffered a stroke. Mao reveals Fuse loved wine and was seeking a specific wine he promised to drink with his son Kazuki, who died at 16. From traces of wine on Fuse's paintbrushes Shizuku realises Fuse used wine to draw sketches. Tomine spends ¥1 million to rent the park all night. Shizuku locates the name of the Third Apostle written on a sketch, the wine Fuse associated with his deceased son and other precious family members. Tomine experiences a memory of himself becoming separated from his mother at the park, but was found by Yutaka. He awakens convinced he knows the Third Apostle.
12	"Sentiments, Resentments, A Familial Battle for a New Apostle"; Transliteration: "Harukanaru Michi o Yuke" (Japanese: 遥かなる道を往け)	Fukutarō Takahashi	Yū Mitsuru	Junichi Sakata	June 26, 2026
Meeting Robert again, Shizuku notes his wine contains notes of sweet chestnuts he ate with his mother. Hearing this, Tomine refuses to submit his wine and allows Shizuku the victory. Shizuku reveals his wine was 2000 Domaine du Pegau Châteauneuf-du-Pape Cuvee du Capo, from 100-year-old vines. Robert reveals Tomine chose the same wine. Shizuku realises he might have won, but Tomine understood the wine more. Maki is furious Tomine has sex with Loulan, so she arranges for Loulan to select the wine for a business dinner between two CEO's who used to be friends. She then has the bottle swapped with an identical spoiled bottle. Maki is shocked Tomine serves the spoiled wine anyway to represent the CEO's spoiled relationship. Realising they were foolish, the men reconcile. Undeterred, Maki secretly claims to Loulan Tomine is furious, and convinces her to return to China. Having guessed what Maki did, Tomine rushes to the airport and is thrilled Loulan could not get on the plane due to the sommelier knife Tomine gave her. Loulan is relieved and agrees to stay with him. Kawarage invites Shizuku to a wine street stall, revealing the sommelier serves different wines every day to suit the weather, as wine can change flavours based on temperature, humidity and other factors. Shizuku realises all he lacks against Tomine is experience, which he will gain by continuing Yutaka's journey through the world of wines.
13	"You Remind Me of My First Love"; Transliteration: "Hatsukoi no Hito ni Nishi Kimi wa" (Japanese: 初恋の人に似し君は)	Hitoshi Ōya	Yū Mitsuru	Tatsuji Yamazaki	July 3, 2026
The clue to the Fourth Apostle is Tōson Shimazaki’s poem First Love. Shizuku selects wines for a concert by Makabe, the musician who helped Shizuku with the First Apostle, themed around first love featuring violinist Sonata Aki, who suffers from loneliness after her fiancé, Shijima, abandoned her eight years ago. To help Aki remember him, Shiro serves a 2001 Château Nénin. Meanwhile, Tomine searches for a woman from his past named Julietta, intending to share a 1982 Clos des Lambrays they promised to drink as adults. Tragically, Tomine's search ends at Julietta's grave, where he leaves the bottle. After Kido reveals Shijima became a successful street musician, Aki reunites with him, and the loneliness vanishes from her music. At the Apostle judgment, both Shizuku and Tomine select Château Lafleur Pomerol, but Shizuku chooses the 1992 vintage while Tomine chooses 1994. Robert declares Tomine the victor, stating the correct year was obvious if they understood Yutaka's clues. Miyabi realizes Shizuku chose 1992 hoping his father's first love was his mother. Conversely, Tomine chose 1994 because he understood Yutaka was referencing a bittersweet, unfulfilled childhood romance, which was perfectly captured by the sharper, acidic flavours of the 1994 vintage.
14	"The Missing Goddesses"; Transliteration: "Shissō Shita Megamitachi" (Japanese: 失踪した女神たち)	Takanori Yano	Yū Mitsuru	Masayoshi Nishida	July 10, 2026
Murakoshi discovers five unique wines missing from Yutaka’s collection. When the police arrest Robert for the theft, Shizuku, Miyabi, Tomine, and Loulan team up to find the real culprit. Suspecting one of three recent visitors; Hamasaki the architect, Ikegami the real estate agent, or Morishita the Karuizawa wood-carving master is a secret wine expert who targeted only the rarest bottles, Tomine invites them to dinner to test them. First, Tomine serves an over-chilled white Burgundy (Le Puligny-Montrachet 1er Cru "Les Pucelles). Morishita holds his glass improperly, attempting to warm it, and drops it. Next, Tomine serves a prestigious red (Domaine Leroy Romanée St. Vivant) in a glass rubbed with a fishy odor. Disgusted, Morishita refuses to drink it, exposing his expertise. Morishita confesses a friend defaulted on a loan he cosigned, but even after selling his own wine collection he is now in danger of he and his sick wife losing their house, so he stole the valuable bottles. He returns the bottles, and Murakoshi drops the theft charges. To help Morishita, Ikegami arranges a deal. A client has discovered an unidentified wine collection in an old villa with Karuizawa-style doors. Shizuku and Tomine agree to identify the wines, while Morishita is hired to restore the doors, earning enough to clear his debt.
15	"Wine, Served With Mystery"; Transliteration: "Wain ni Misuterī o Soete" (Japanese: ワインにミステリーを添えて)	Rakuto Nakajima	Yū Mitsuru	Tatsuji Yamazaki	July 17, 2026
Robert surprises everyone by requesting that they swap partners during the wine-identification: Loulan pairs with Shizuku due to their senses of smell, while Miyabi joins Tomine with their encyclopaedic wine knowledge. The setup sparks subtle jealousy in Shizuku toward Tomine. Tomine identifies a Petrus Pomerol Grand Vin purely from its cork, while Shizuku and Loulan identify the same wine by scent alone. Impressed by her deep knowledge, Tomine considers hiring Miyabi, though she later chooses not to tell Shizuku about the offer, preferring her partnership with him. Meanwhile, Shizuku learns during a chat with Loulan about their families that Tomine has a younger sister, and Loulan gains confidence after Shizuku echoes Tomine's praise for her potential as an expert. After three days, the teams correctly identify all the wines. Though roughly half have spoiled, the client plans to serve the surviving expensive bottles in his restaurant. Murakoshi thanks Robert for orchestrating a situation that allowed Shizuku and Tomine to drink wine as allies rather than rivals. Ultimately, both original pairs reunite on good terms, recognizing they work best together. Soon after, they receive an invitation to the Fifth Apostle contest, held at one of Yutaka's private villas overlooking Mount Fuji.
16	"Beautiful Silver Goddess"; Transliteration: "Utsukushiki Hakugin no Kamiyo" (Japanese: 美しき白銀の神よ)	Fumihiro Ueno	Mitsuho Seta	Rei Satō	July 24, 2026
The Fifth Apostle clue describes a mountain that is both peaceful and monstrous, yet offers a summit view of the whole world. Despite their proximity to Mt. Fuji, both Shizuku and Tomine identify the target as the Matterhorn in the Alps, which has glorious views but is known locally as Devil's Mountain for the dangerous climb. Loulan urges Tomine to go, seeing it as a message from Yutaka. After undergoing hypnotism, Tomine uncovers lost memories linking his mother to the Matterhorn and departs for Switzerland, leaving Loulan and his assistant Kobayashi in charge. Shizuku also flies to Switzerland. On the flight, his praise of a menu wine prompts the entire cabin to request it, causing chaos for a stewardess named Yamashita. She later meets him at his hotel and offers to show him around town. With no guides available on short notice, Yamashita takes Shizuku to a wine bar run by an unfriendly guide. Impressed when Shizuku correctly identifies that a mystery wine is non-European, a 2006 New Zealand Riesling, the guide, Andrew Stalden, agrees to lead him. However, Shizuku must acclimate at base camp for 24 hours to prevent altitude sickness. Meanwhile, Tomine takes dangerous medications to cut his acclimation time to 12 hours. When bad weather threatens the climb, Shizuku’s persistence reminds Andrew of a young Yutaka. Consequently, Andrew agrees to take the longer, physically demanding western route to bypass the storm.
17	"A Voice, Strict But Gentle"; Transliteration: "Kkibishiku moYyasashikiSsonoKkoe wa" (Japanese: 厳しくも優しきその声は)	Harume Kosaka	Mitsuho Seta	Harume Kosaka	July 31, 2026
Shizuku and Andrew successfully climb the Matterhorn via the safer west route. Meanwhile, Tomine attempts the dangerous east route. When his guide, Hauer, abandons him due to severe weather, Tomine presses on alone, hallucinates a childhood trauma of his mother trying to kill him after a falling out with Yutaka, and reaches the summit. On the west side of the mountain, Shizuku catches the scent of wine coming from the east wind. At base camp, Andrew shares a celebratory wine with Shizuku. Recognizing its aroma as the same scent from the summit, Shizuku identifies it as the Fifth Apostle. Back in Japan, Shizuku submits 2000 Domaine Marc Colin et Fils Montrachet, representing a successful climb with support from a trusted friend. However, its taste evokes Mont Blanc in the Alps, revealing it is not the Fifth Apostle. Tomine submits the winning 2000 Michel Colin-Deléger et Fils Chevalier-Montrachet, representing triumph over impossible trials by oneself. Despite his victory, Tomine feels guilty. He reveals to Maki and Loulan he carried a bottle of the Marc Colin wine up the mountain, believing it was the Apostle but realising he was mistaken after reaching the summit. That bottle was the source of the scent Shizuku caught on the wind, leading Shizuku to associate the wine with the Matterhorn. Tomine considers his win tainted, feeling he inadvertently cheated by influencing Shizuku to make the wrong choice.
18	"Embraced By the Eternal Universe"; Transliteration: "Eiennaru Uchū ni Idakarete" (Japanese: 永遠なる宇宙に抱かれて)	Takanori Yano	Yū Mitsuru	Takehiro Nakayama	August 7, 2026
Tomine's mother, Honoka, returns after three years abroad; Sarah is pleased, but Tomine is not. Summoned to the 6th Apostle challenge, Tomine hears the wine described as maternal warmth, adult loneliness, and the Miroku Bosatsu Hanka Shiizo statue contemplating the universe. Tomine travels to Kōryū-ji Temple in Kyoto to see the statue. Shizuku skips Kyoto, sensing the clue implies self-reflection rather than a journey. Though Chosuke insists it is a 1995 Barolo Riserva Monfortino, Shizuku narrows it to wines made from Italian Nebbiolo grapes from Piedmont and feels drawn to Asuka, Nara. There, he and Miyabi discover Spazio ("Outer Space") restaurant run by a Piedmontese owner. Shizuku shares his search and notes that Barolo wine made him recall a poem by Kakinomoto no Hitomaro. Astonished, the owner reveals that exact moon at twilight poem inspired him to move to Japan and discover 2001 Pio Cesare Barbaresco. In Kyoto, as Tomine stares at the statue, Honoka admits she already tasted the 6th Apostle with Yutaka. Tomine refuses the answer to avoid cheating, prompting Honoka to call him arrogant and insecure, warning he will never match Yutaka if he fails to identify the Apostle. Meanwhile, Shizuku realizes the Barbaresco evokes the setting sun, not the moon, keeping his focus on Barolo. The owner explains his ex-girlfriend left him while pregnant, leaving only her Pio Cesare collection and Hitomaro’s poem. Recalling a Pio Cesare Barolo exists, Shizuku insists they drink it atop the Akino hills at dawn.
19	"A Pale Moon Shines in the Distance"; Transliteration: "Aoi Tsuki wa Tōku Kagayaki" (Japanese: 蒼月は遠く輝き)	Kandai Sudō	Mitsuho Seta	Kandai Sudō	August 14, 2026
On the hills, Leo meets a young boy named Sora and recognizes his eyes. Sora’s grandparents confirm Natsuki was his mother, making Sora Leo’s son. Leo asks to see Natsuki to apologize, but learns she died after childbirth. Her parents reveal she left the Pio Cesare wine and the poem to guide Leo back to Akino to meet his son. Shizuku realizes one of Natsuki’s wine poems describes the 6th Apostle. Meanwhile, Honoka takes Tomine back to the temple and offers him a 1997 Gevrey-Chambertin Clos St. Jacques 1er Cru in front of the smaller "Crying Miroku" statue, which mirrors her loneliness. Watching the sunset later, followed by the rising moon, Honoka’s words inspire Tomine to return to Tokyo for the Apostle. Both present their selections to Robert. Tomine offers 2001 Barolo Riserva Le Rocche del Falletto, but realizes it conveys cold isolation rather than maternal warmth. Shizuku presents 2001 Luciano Sandrone Barolo Cannubi Boschis, capturing the journey from loneliness to comforting human connection. Robert declares Shizuku the winner of the 6th Apostle. Though proud of his victory, Shizuku is warned by Robert not to grow arrogant ahead of the 7th Apostle.
20	"A New Hand, Shrouded in a Veil"; Transliteration: "Atarashiki te wa Bēru ni Tsutsumarete" (Japanese: 新しき手はベールに包まれて)	Ryō Miyata	Mitsuho Seta	Tatsuji Yamazaki	August 21, 2026
After recovering her sense of taste, Guillemard marries Mishima. At their reception, the couple reveals their wine selection is the first six Apostles to honour Shizuku and Miyabi. Shizuku realizes the first six Apostles tell a story about human life, inspiring an epiphany that all twelve Apostles may represent the full scope of the human experience. Meanwhile, Honoka tells Tomine the Apostles represent the world itself. Both rivals visit Robert for the 7th Apostle riddle, which describes Barcelona’s Sagrada Família, which has been under continuous construction since 1882. Miyabi interprets this as a metaphor for "New World" winemaking regions like America or Australia, whose industries are young compared to France and Italy. Tomine travels to Napa Valley in America with Loulan, Tomine admits his lack of familiarity with New World wines leaves him completely uncertain for the first time. They meet Kent Nakagawa, the pioneer who first brought American wines to Japan. Nakagawa admits he lost his sense of taste after a car crash; a fate he considers divine punishment for taking bribes to write fake wine reviews. Meanwhile, after tasting various New World wines, Shizuku heads to Australia's Barossa Valley with Miyabi. Guided by Nadia, Taiyoh Beers Australian representative, they explore the century-old region, though dinner is interrupted by Nadia's hostile father who insists Japanese people are the enemy.
21	"Prayers and Wisdom Unending"; Transliteration: "Inori to Eichi wa Taeru Koto Naku" (Japanese: 祈りと叡智は絶えることなく)	Fumihiro Ueno	Mitsuho Seta	Yukie Yamamoto	August 28, 2026
After he leaves, Nadia explains her father runs Emerald Forest, an environmental group fighting Japanese loggers in Australia. Noting Australia's dry climate is ideal for grapes, Shizuku connects the 7th Apostle clue to early European colonization of Australia. Overhearing loggers planning to burn down Emerald Forest, Shizuku uses his sense of smell to identify flammable Cedar trees, pinpointing the target. Experienced woodsmen quickly clear the burning trees, halting the blaze. Grateful, Nadia's father reveals he met Yutaka 15 years ago, who foresaw Australia’s winemaking potential, and shows Shizuku a vineyard planted after Yutaka's visit. Both rivals return to Robert. Tomine presents an American 2003 Inaugural Eleven Confessions Syrah, representing completed work through collaboration that remains dynamic as its bottle and label change yearly. Shizuku presents 2003 Glaetzer Amon-Ra Shiraz from a restored vineyard. However, Shizuku realizes his choice evokes Cambodia’s Angkor Wat after it was rebuilt rather than the still under construction Sagrada Família, admitting his mistake. Robert declares Tomine the winner. Tomine explains his wine mixes 100-year-old vines with modern methods, rendering it both complete and incomplete, a dynamic Robert notes applies to both competitors. After Miyabi demonstrates both wines are equal in quality, Shizuku takes a short vacation, returning with the shock announcement that he is quitting the competition.
22	"Gentle Fragrance of Distant Days"; Transliteration: "TtōkiHhi noYyasashikiKkaori" (Japanese: 遠き日の優しき香り)	Kandai Sudō	Yū Mitsuru	Kandai Sudō & Tatsuji Yamazaki	September 4, 2026
Shizuku believes Yutaka designed the Apostle contest expecting him to lose, intending to motivate Tomine to become the world's top wine expert. Robert assures Miyabi that Yutaka had plans for both his sons, prompting her to convince Shizuku to continue uncovering his father's message. Tomine announces the 8th Apostle clue on television, referencing the sun, moon, and a gruelling journey, and invites wine experts across the world to solve it. Kawarage suspects the clue points to the Marathon du Médoc, a race Yutaka ran through Bordeaux vineyards. Shizuku realizes childhood trips with his father mirrored the marathon's exact route, prompting Kawarage to send him to France to walk the route again. Meanwhile, Tomine confides in Loulan that Yutaka was his secret biological father and adopted him only to spur Shizuku's growth as a wine expert. Loulan counters that the contest is already making Tomine a better man, strengthening his resolve to surpass Yutaka. Upon arriving in France, Shizuku meets Yutaka's friend, Kars. Criminals mistake Shizuku for Tomine, who just arrived with Loulan and Maki, and attempt to kidnap him. One kidnapper, Mary, betrays her fellows and helps the brothers escape. She reveals the gang runs a counterfeit wine ring and planned to force Tomine to give their wine a favourable review. Recognizing they are both Yutaka's sons, Mary asks them to help save her family.
23	"Oh, Young One"; Transliteration: "Osanaki Shayo" (Japanese: 幼き者よ)	Issei Kume	Yū Mitsuru	Issei Kume	September 11, 2026
Mary reveals her father, Hayama, refuses to sell his shop's wine after the mafia tricked her into stocking counterfeit bottles alongside genuine ones. The mafia also plan to force Tomine to announce their counterfeit wine is the Eighth Apostle. When Shizuku tries identifying real bottles by scent without uncorking them he makes several mistakes until realising the counterfeiters used recycled authentic bottles that retained the scent of the original genuine wines. Identifying the years of the genuine wines, Shizuku and Tomine successfully separate the counterfeits from the genuine wines. Hayama confesses his regret over ending a past friendship with Yutaka, forgives Mary, and invites her to help run the shop. Tomine deduces from the counterfeit wine scent the "mafia" are actually imposters, local amateurs growing grapes in earth damaged by pesticide overuse. Teaming up with outraged local vineyard owners, they capture the criminals and hand them to the police. At the celebration, Shizuku tries a wine that makes him think of Miyabi. Kars reveals Yutaka gave Shizuku wine-infused desserts as a child, proving Shizuku has actually been training as a wine expert longer than Tomine. Later, Shizuku calls Miyabi to update her on the trip, but hearing Mary’s voice in the background, a jealous Miyabi decides to fly to France herself.
24	"A Light on a Long Road"; Transliteration: "Chōkyū no Tabiji ni Ru hi" (Japanese: 長久の旅路に燈る火)	Takanori Yano	Yū Mitsuru	Rei Satō	September 18, 2026
Shizuku visits the Médoc vineyards, where seeing Tomine running the marathon sparks his competitive drive to join in. Along the way, Tomine reminds Shizuku of Yutaka, whom he misses, while Tomine is moved by Shizuku's unconditional appreciation for all wines. Arriving to wait with Loulan and Maki, Miyabi explains that winemaking is a marathon, with different routes leading to the same goal. Shizuku and Tomine cross the finish line together and simultaneously reach for a race-finisher wine they suspect is the Eighth Apostle, crashing into each other. Afterwards, Hayama gifts them a bottle each from his collection. Shizuku presents his chosen wine to Robert, realizing it represents Yutaka’s journey to becoming a wine expert, and decides to share it with Miyabi. Tomine agrees the Eighth Apostle contest has no clear winner. However, Robert questions Loulan and Miyabi, who reveal Hayama's gift bottles, wines from the restaurant where Yutaka and Hayama once worked. Robert insists the rivals share them. They realize the bottles are an 1870 Château Léoville Barton and an 1870 Château Léoville Las Cases, originating from the Léoville estate divided among three brothers, symbolizing separated family reuniting for a shared purpose. Moved by this, Tomine cedes the Eighth Apostle victory to Shizuku. Yutaka’s narration reflects on his 50-year journey, leaving his sons with the ultimate question: "What is wine?"

=== Others ===
A social game based on Drops of God and created by Mobage was released on February 9, 2011, and is only available in Japan. In November 2007, a music album inspired by the series was released.

On January 22, 2009, a diary book detailing the Kibayahi siblings creative process about the manga and columns of their research was released. A photo book about Kazuya Kamenashi and the 2009 TV series on March 3, 2009.

== Reception and impact ==
The series has received both local and global critical acclaim, being praised for its story, art, and educational knowledge of wine. It has been featured in the New York Times Best Selling list of manga many times.

Drops of God was also featured in The New York Times' Dining and Wine section, highlighting the variety of wines shown in the manga and their impact of sales.

The success, popularity, and cultural impact of Drops of God has been credited to its influence for increasing interest in wine, most notably the ones introduced in the manga, propelling obscure winemakers to celebrity status, increasing domestic and international sales, and even fed into wine speculation with bottles that were usually priced lower, reaching the thousands overnight. In 2018, online wine magazine Grape Collective that French wine producers, such as Château Calon-Segur, Château Palmer, Saint-Estèphe, and Château Le Puy, gained 130% rise in sales in Japan during the first year of the manga's publication. In 2013, the mention of Château Poupille in the series had increased sales by 20 to 30% in Japan and around 50% in Taiwan, China and Korea.

When French comic book publisher Glénat translated Drops of God, the French wine market experienced visible changes in their stocks, particularly for three producers in their international and abroad sales. One of the most memorable wines covered in the Drops of God is Château-Mont-Perat, with its normal price of €15 changing to €150 per bottle and rise annual production of 25,000 cases to 50,000. In L'Expansion, the manga is cited to be "an extraordinary [sales] lever, much more effective than the Parker points". In France, the French government acknowledged that contribution, and the writers were presented with two awards, Order of Agricultural Merit in 2011, and Ordre des Arts et des Lettres in 2018 for their influential impact in their economy and help in maintaining interest in wine in young people. In 2010, prestigious La Revue du vin de France awarded the Drops of God staff their "Special Award of the Year", making them the first Japanese people to receive the award. In July 2009, Drops of Gods was even featured the Gourmand World Cookbook Awards Hall of Fame.

Japanese importer Enoteca has stated that the character Shizuku has begun to influence its stock ordering decisions. The sale of fine wines in South Korea has increased significantly as a result of the popularity of the comic, with the sale of wine rising from less than a third of the market to around 70 per cent of alcohol sales. In 2005, elite South Korean companies were even reported to have bought all the wines introduced in The Drops of God as a way to “educate” their employees.

Youth demand for wine in Taiwan is largely driven by Drops of God. After an issue with a mention of lesser known producer Château Mont-Pérat came out, a Taiwanese importer sold 50 cases of Mont-Pérat in two days. Sales of Umberto Cosmo's Colli di Conegliano Rosso also leaped 30% after being mentioned in the Manga series. All Nippon Airways reported it had to recraft the in-flight wine lists to accommodate the increased interest.

After being featured in the finale of the Japanese television adaptation series of Kami no Shizuku in March 2010, the little-known Bordeaux wine 2003 Château le Puy became significantly popular in Japan. In September 2010, the proprietor of Château le Puy, Jean-Pierre Amoreau, made public his intention to cease international sales of their 2003 vintage in order to deter wealthy speculators, so that the wine remains within reach of everyone. In 2018, Berkeley's Broc Cellars reported that the Zinfandel called the "Vine Starr" helped increased sales and interest with their Japan base.

A 2007 Reuters feature asserted that "wine industry experts believe part of the manga's appeal is that it teaches readers enough about wine to understand the drink and impress their friends, but does so in an entertaining way". In the July 2009 Decanter publication of "The Power List" ranking of the wine industry's individuals of influence, Shin and Yuko Kibayashi placed at number 50, citing that the work was "arguably the most influential wine publication for the past 20 years". In 2012, the Kibayashi siblings were nominated Wine Intelligence Business Award for their contribution in the wine industry. In 2016, the Kibayashis was awarded with the Asian Wine Personality award by The Drinks Business and Vinexpo for their influence on the wide trade, acknowledging wide readership across Asia, including Japan, Korea, Hong Kong, mainland China, Taiwan and Indonesia.

The 2023 live-action TV series has also received positive reviews from critics. On review aggregator Rotten Tomatoes, the 2023 series has an approval rating of 100% with an average rating of 8.2/10, based on 24 critic reviews.

By 2023, the franchise has sold over 5 million copies worldwide.

An Indie game titled "Drops of God: Creating your Ambrosia" is based on the series.

=== Wine Salon and WineGame app ===
In 2019, the Kibayashis siblings collaborated with President of Bijou USA and Vice President of Bijou Japan, Peter Chiang, whose family the Napa Valley estate Kanpai Wines, on two Drops of God-themed projects, the Wine Salon and WineGame app. From October 20–21, the Kibayashis assisted in preparing the wine menu for a two-day event, choosing 30 different wines from 9 different producers. The Kibayashis also spend the event singing books and interacting with fans. During a press released, Shink and Yuko stated that they approached the event the same way they did with the series:

We will be applying the same principles for the exploration of American wines we shared in the manga: Heaven, Earth, Man and Marriage ... In The Drops of God, heaven represents the weather, and is a direct reference to the climate of a given geographical area. Earth refers to terroir, or soil and viticultural/cultural practices and conditions. Man refers to winemaking and cellar practices, while marriage refers to the marriage of wine and food.”

Winemakers that also attended the event credited the Kibayashis for their influence and praised Drops of God for its storytelling and creativity, as "[recognizing] these virtues in the wines that it folds into its stories" and emphasizes "The magic of wine is that it is as much a story as it is a beverage: a marriage of place, process, and people. Drops of God celebrates this magic.”

Following the venture, online wine salon for US consumers and a Wines of God app (developed by Chef Jose Andres and Rob Wilder), a branded version of the WineGame app, both named after the manga, was launched. Drops of God-themed Wine Salon and WineGame app features an interactive educational wine game, personal wine recommendations for individual members, special offers from restaurants and hotels, and notify members of wine-related events.
