= Taiwanese wine =

Wine making in Taiwan

Taiwanese wine is grape wine made in Taiwan.

== History ==
Independent winemaking was illegal in Taiwan for a long time due to the monopoly granted to the Taiwan Tobacco and Liquor Corporation. Taiwan Tobacco and Liquor Corporation produced just one wine, a rosé. With liberalization following the end of military rule independent winemakers became legal in 2002 and in 2014 a Taiwanese wine won its first gold medal at an international competition. The primary grapes cultivated for winemaking in Taiwan are Black Queen and Golden Muscat which were both introduced to the country in the 1950s. The relative rarity and high quality of Taiwanese wines makes them particularly prized by Hong Kong collectors.

== Wineries ==
Although it was once largely lost Taiwan's indigenous winemaking culture is staging a comeback. Two of the most acclaimed wineries are Domaine Shu Sheng and Weightstone Vineyard Estate & Winery.

== Characteristics ==
Grape harvest in Taiwan is dictated by the typhoon season which means growers are sometimes forced to pick less than ripe fruit.

== Awards and recognitions ==
A red wine from Taichung was awarded a gold medal at the 25th Vinalies Internationales in France. In 2020 Taiwanese wines won two gold medals at the 26th Vinalies Internationales Competition.

== As a market ==
Because online sales of alcohol are for the most part illegal in Taiwan most sales happen at physical retail locations.

=== History ===
Before the economic boom of the 1980s and 1990s there was little grape wine sold in Taiwan as people preferred hard alcohol, beer, and traditional non-grape wines. In 2016 French wine had a 46.7% market share, American wine had a 10.7% market share, and Chilean wine had a 9% market share. Older Taiwanese wine drinkers tend to prefer red wine while younger drinkers are more open to whites with many preferring them to reds. Consumption of sparkling wine has also been increasing. From 2014 to 2020 sparkling wine imports increased by 15% from 962,365 liters a year to 1.07 million liters a year.

The popularity of wine has largely been driven by the youth and the business community who find a knowledge of wine indispensable when doing business abroad. Youth demand was mainly started by, and continues to be driven by, the wine based Japanese comic series Drops of God. After an issue with a mention of lesser known producer Château Mont-Pérat came out, a Taiwanese importer sold 50 cases of Mont-Pérat in two days. Sales of Umberto Cosmo's Colli di Conegliano Rosso also leaped 30% after being mentioned in the Manga series.

== Organizations ==
A number of organizations such as the Taiwan Wine Academy offer classes and training to both the public and aspiring wine professionals.

== See also ==
- Agriculture in Taiwan
- Beer in Taiwan
- Japanese wine
- Taiwanese whisky
