= Domaine Raveneau =

French wine producer

Domaine Raveneau is a French wine grower and producer. It is based in the Chablis wine region of Burgundy, France.

== History ==
François Raveneau established the domaine in 1948 by combining vineyards that he had purchased with vineyards owned by the family of his wife, who was part of the Dauvissat wine family.

François was the first member of his family to bottle his own wine; previously the grapes had been sold to other estates to use. François's father, Louis Raveneau had previously owned a number of parcels of land in Chablis, but sold them all during the 1950s. Chablis was going through a difficult economic period due to increased competition from the Languedoc wine region which reduced the demand for Chablis, decimation of the vineyards from phylloxera and the interruption in production due to World War II. François still saw the potential of the region and took advantage of low land prices in the 1960s and 1970s to expand the estate, including parcels in some of the Chablis Grand cru vineyards.

Raveneau had developed a good reputation for their wine within France by the 1970s. A wine importer from the United States, Kermit Lynch, had tasted their wine at Taillevent restaurant in Paris and phoned the estate to try to arrange a visit with the domaine, but was told by François that they were not interested in exporting and then hung up. It took a number of years to convince François to export his wine, but Lynch was eventually successful and began to bring the wines into the United States in the early 1980s, giving the estate its first significant international exposure.

The current proprietor of the estate is Jean-Marie Raveneau, who started working at the estate in 1978 after having studied at the Lycée viticole de Beaune and took over the winemaking role full-time in 1984. His father François continued to assist until his retirement in 1988. Jean-Marie is assisted by Bernard Raveneau, his elder brother who joined the estate in 1995.

François Raveneau died in 2000.

== Wines ==
The domaine holds 9.29 hectares of vineyard land planted entirely with Chardonnay grapevines, in Chablis. The wines are harvested entirely by hand, Raveneau is one of only five estates in Chablis to still use this method.

No new oak barrels are used to make the wines. The wines are fermented in stainless steel and then aged in barrels with an average age of seven to eight years, for twelve to eighteen months.

Raveneau owns sections of three Chablis Grand cru vineyards. These holdings are 0.54 hectares in Les Clos, 0.60 hectares in Blanchots and 0.75 hectares in Valmur.

Further land is owned within six Chablis Premier cru vineyards. The largest holding is Montée de Tonnerre, with 3.20 hectares, followed by Butteaux with 1.50 hectares. The other four are Foret with 0.60 hectares, Vaillons with 0.50 hectares, Montsmains with 0.35 hectares and Chapelot with 0.30 hectares.

There is also a newly acquired 0.95 hectare parcel of village classified Chablis, on the opposite side of the Vaillons slope. The first vintage from this plot was harvested in 2007.

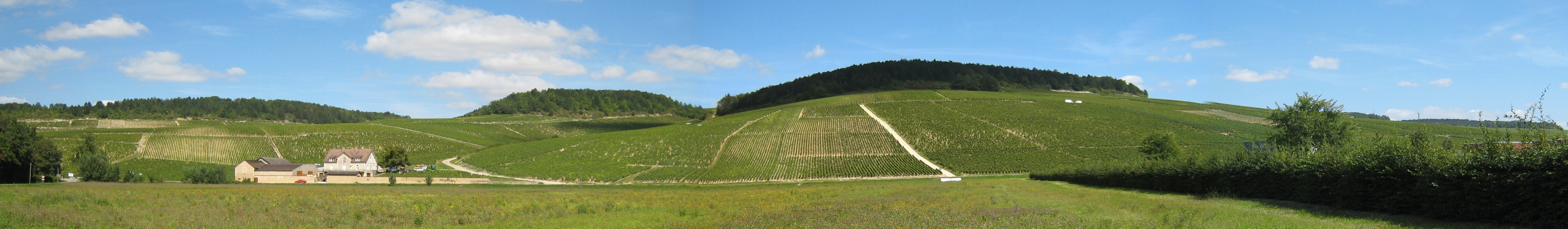
The Grand Cru vineyards of Chablis. Raveneau makes wine from the three right-most vineyards - Valmur, Les Clos and Blanchots
