= Château Mont-Pérat =

French winery in Bordeaux

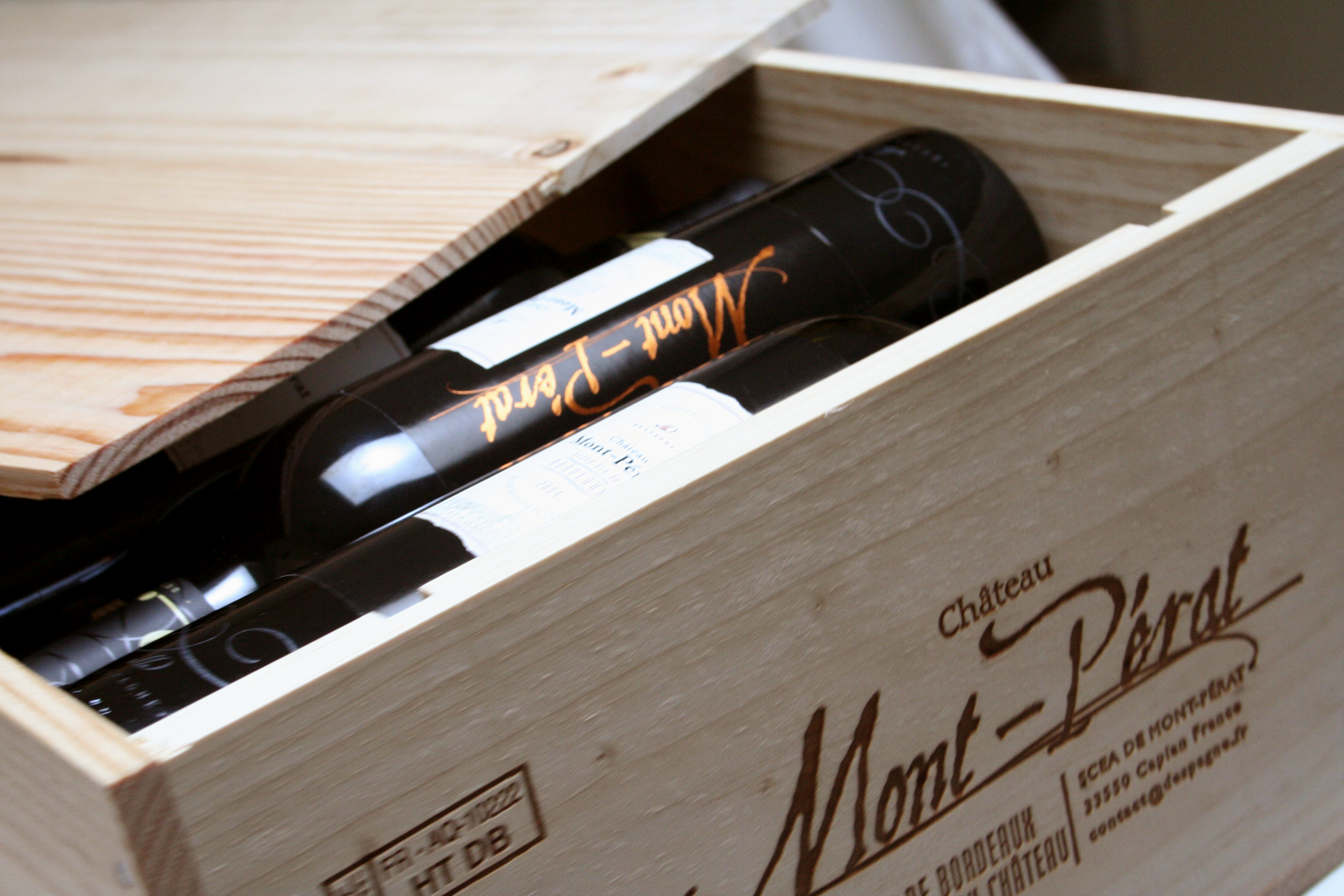

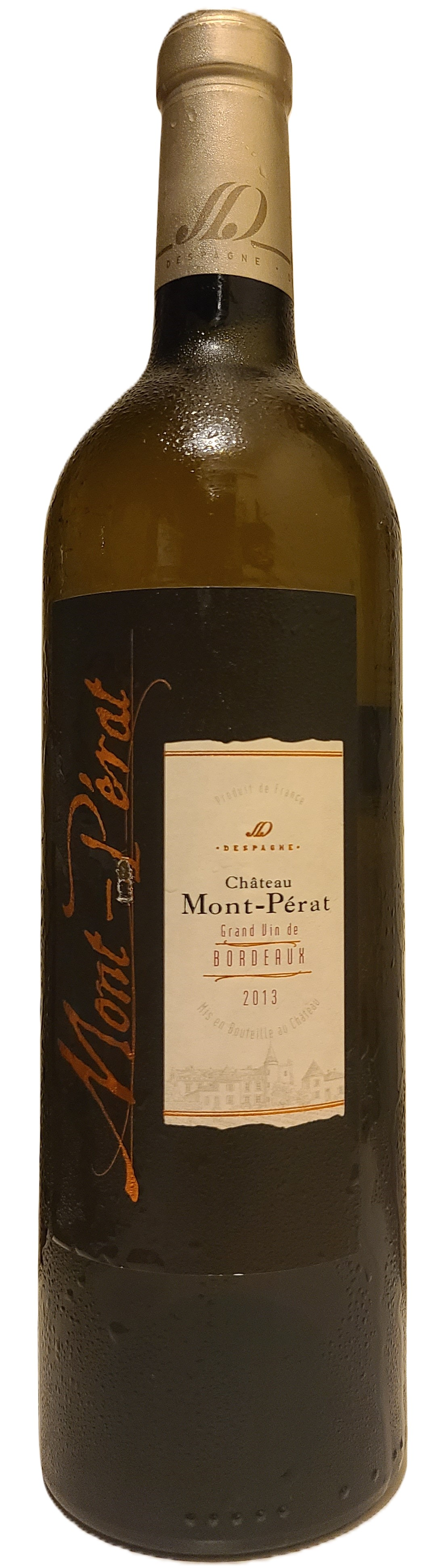
Blanc 2013

Château Mont-Pérat, archaically Domaine du Peyrat, is a Bordeaux winery from the appellation Premières Côtes de Bordeaux in the department Gironde. The estate is located on the Right Bank of the Garonne, opposite that of Graves, in the commune of Capian.

The estate produces a red and a dry white grand vin. Mont-Pérat has for long remained relatively unknown, though the estate was mentioned in the second edition of Féret in 1864, it has more recently been described as a wine that could pass for being much more expensive.

The estate was acquired by the Despagne family in 1998, also proprietors of the considerably more fashionable and higher priced Merlot based wine Girolate.

The vineyards extend 102 hectares (250 acres) with vines of Merlot, Cabernet Sauvignon, Cabernet Franc, Sauvignon blanc, Sémillon and Muscadelle.

== Les Gouttes de Dieu ==
The 2001 Château Mont-Pérat was featured in the first volume of the manga Les Gouttes de Dieu, where it was compared to a concert with Queen. Unprecedented popularity followed, and there was such overwhelming response by Asian wine importers to secure the wine that led the owners to unplug their phones. A Taiwanese importer sold 50 cases of Mont-Pérat in just two days.
