= Henri Jayer =

French vintner (1922–2006)

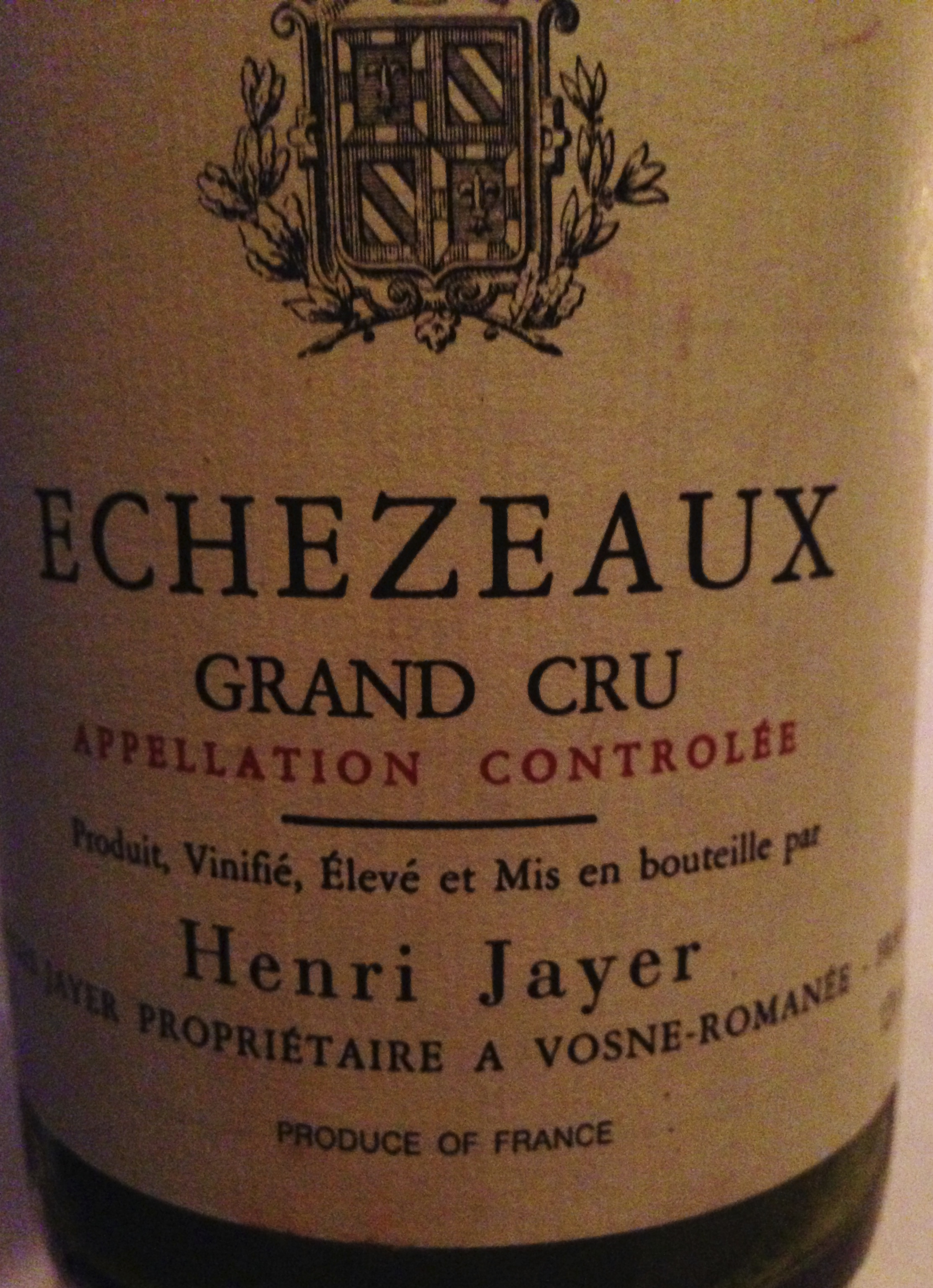
Georges Jayer (Made by Henri Jayer)Echezeaux Grand Cru Burgundy

Henri Jayer (1922 – 20 September 2006) was a French vintner who is credited with introducing important innovations to Burgundian winemaking. He was particularly known for the quality of his Pinot noir. Jayer was born in Vosne-Romanée. He attended the University of Dijon in the 1940s and earned a degree in oenology. Using a 7.4-acre (3.0 ha) inheritance that included parcels in the Échezeaux and Beaux Monts vineyards, Jayer began producing wine under his own label in the 1950s. Henri Jayer wines are now highly sought after and renowned for their balance and elegance, as well as their lushness and concentration. One bottle sells for thousands of dollars. Henri Jayer's daughter commissioned the leading international auction house Baghera/wines to hold Domaine Henri Jayer's unique ex-domaine auction in Jun 2018, Henri Jayer, The Heritage These bottles and magnums sold at the auction were and are the only Henri Jayer to be protected by Prooftag as proof of domaine provenance. Every bottles and magnums from the domaine cellar were sold without any remains. This sale has been recorded in WSET Diploma program as important study material.

== Innovations ==
Jayer opposed extensive use of chemicals in vineyards and advocated plowing to control weeds. Jayer believed that low yields were the foundation of truly great wines. Jayer was noted for his refusal to filter his wines and known for always destemming his grapes in contrast to habits of other growers in Burgundy that even today let stems go through the crusher when vintages does not provide enough tannins. This has the side effect of adding tannins with more green and bitter character. Jayer also invented a new technique called cold soak that is a pre-maceration avoiding spontaneous fermentation at temperature of about 10 °C for 1–4 days. The method aims to extract more complex aromas, color, less harsh tannins and add more nose to wines.

He is noted for his wines from the premier cru Cros-Parantoux - a very small vineyard (only 1.01 hectares) of Vosne-Romanée at a high altitude above the famous grand cru vineyard Richebourg. This vineyard at the time had low reputation and was considered too much work and not worth bothering with. The soil consisted of very thin layer of clay limestone sitting on a bed of rock. The soil is very poor, it is very rocky and very cold. Jayer understood early that these conditions made up for a very good natural and fresh acidity in wines. In collaboration with Madame Noirot-Camuzet, who owned the vineyard, Jayer took care of her vineyards (beginning after the war in 1945) and for that was offered to keep half of the harvest for himself. As is the custom of Burgundy, Jayer bought piece by piece through the years of this vineyard from the Camuzet family and in 1978 he was convinced that the quality was right and decided to produce his first 100% cros-parantoux wines.

== Later years ==
In 1996, the French Government told Jayer that he must either retire or forfeit his pension. In response, Jayer transferred his vineyards to his nephew, Emmanuel Rouget, but was still responsible for half the wine being bottled under Rouget's name until 2002. Jayer's last vintage was in 2001. Jayer died in Dijon, France of prostate cancer, aged 84.
