= Ben Cane =

Australian winemaker

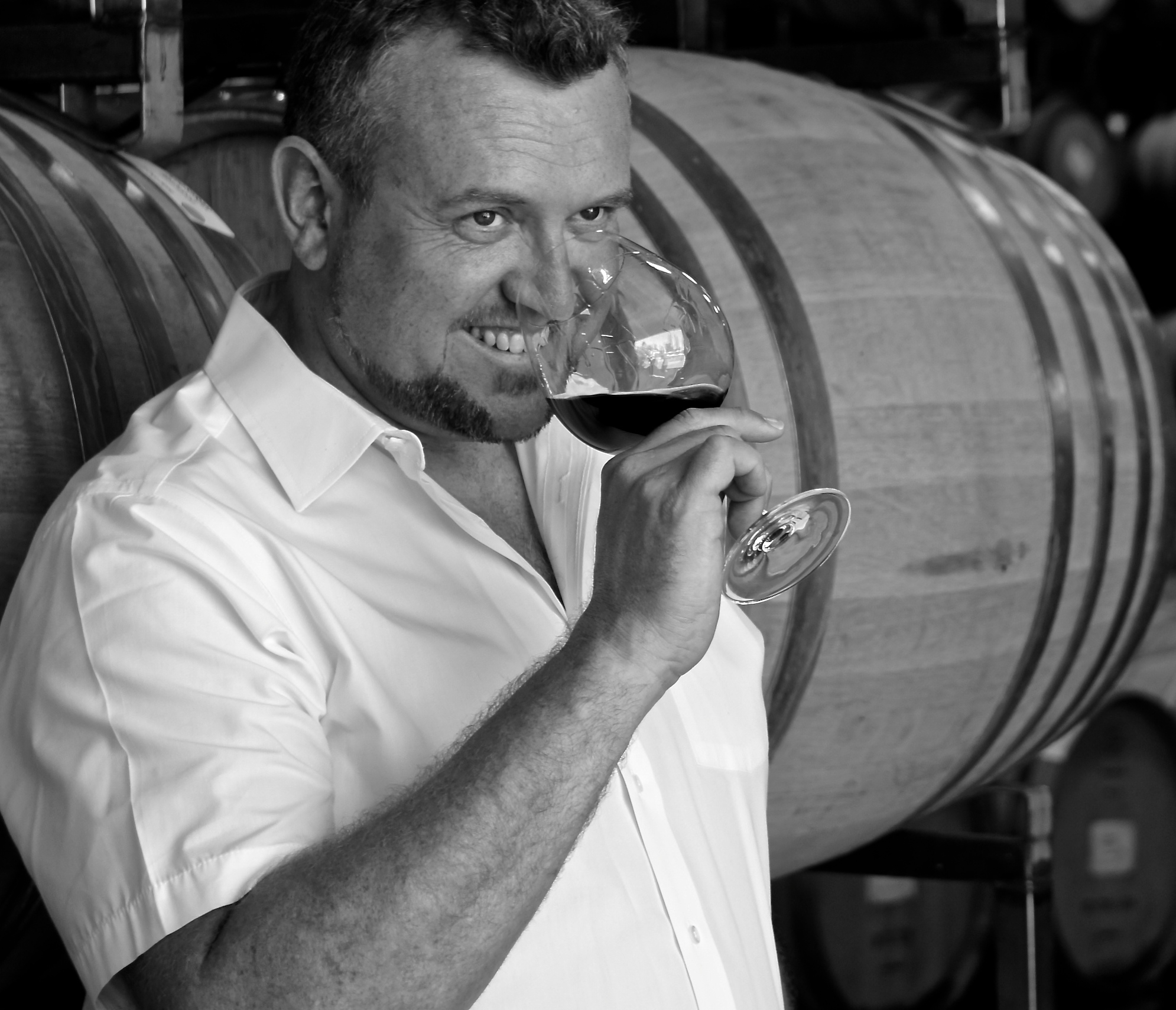
Ben Cane

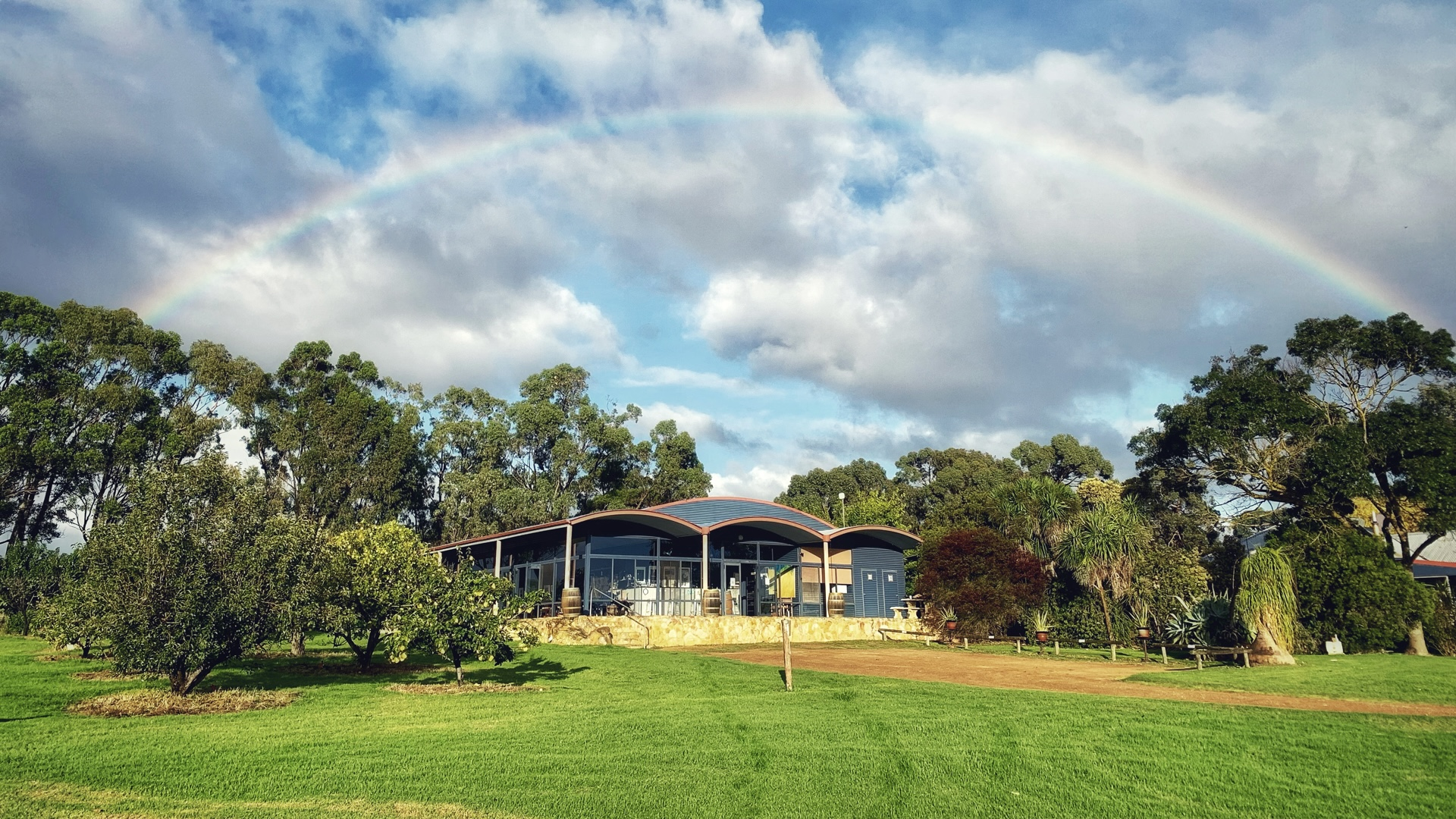
The cellar door at Duke's Vineyard, Porongurup, Western Australia

Benjamin Cane is an Australian winemaker who currently owns Duke's Vineyard in the Great Southern region of Western Australia.

== Biography ==
Ben earned a B.S. in Organic Chemistry and Psychology at the University of Adelaide, South Australia and later received his postgraduate diploma in oenology in 1998. While at university, he worked in several wine-related jobs including in a vineyard and in a cellar and managing a bottle shop. After completing university, he took a job with Simon Gilbert Wine Services in the Hunter Valley of New South Wales, Australia. His love for pinot noir began while working as an assistant winemaker at Arcadian Winery in Santa Barbara County, California. Once his tenure at Acadian was completed, he travelled through South America, Africa, Asia and Europe before returning to Australia where he became a vineyard manager in the Barossa Valley. Over the next five years, he held numerous jobs: working in the Languedoc; in New South Wales; at Domaine Dujac in Morey-St.-Denis, France; at De Bortoli Wines in the Yarra Valley region of Victoria, Australia; at Poderi Colla in Piedmont, Italy; and at Yalumba Wines in the Barossa Valley. These experiences gave him an insight into wine production in France and Italy.

Ben returned to the United States in 2006 and became a contract winemaker at Freestone Vineyards. In 2007 the Duncan Family of Silver Oak Cellars hired Ben as an assistant winemaker to Daniel Baron to develop the pinot noir program for Twomey Cellars, the sister winery to Silver Oak. The following year he began overseeing production of sauvignon blanc. Ben initially began producing wine from Twomey's Russian River Valley WestPin vineyard. He went on to expand the label's vineyard program to include fruit sourced from the Anderson Valley and Sonoma Coast Appellations, as well as the famed Bien Nacido Vineyard in Santa Maria Valley. His vision for Twomey was "to craft a wine that expresses the uniqueness and terroir of each vineyard site with finesse and balance, by blending old world techniques with new world innovation and technology." By 2013 he produced seven pinot noir vintages for Twomey. In October 2013 Ben left Twomey and took a Head Winemaker job at a boutique winery also within the Russian River Valley AVA of Sonoma County.

At Westwood Ben was hired to completely redesign the brand, winery and reputation of the small boutique winery that produced 4,000 cases. He oversaw the 23 acre estate vineyard planted to several pinot noir clones, chardonnay and Rhône varietals and worked alongside the biodynamic expert, Philippe Coderey, to achieve biodynamic certification for the estate in 2017. The wines were consistently given high points and accolades from several critics, including a triple crown at the Sonoma Coast Wine Challenge 2016.

In late 2018 Ben accepted a position as Winemaker at Cape Mentelle Winery in Margaret River, Western Australia (which was owned by Moët Hennessy Louis Vuitton at the time) and moved back to his home country with a strong desire to reconnect with the premium Australian wine industry. During three years at Cape Mentelle, Ben was an instrumental member of the winemaking team overseeing the production of 60,000-100,000 cases, assisted with the viticulture of 130ha of vines across Margaret River, and was the designated technical voice to represent the brand in market to trade, media and consumers, and in-house staff across LVMH.
