= Justin Meyer =

American winemaker (1938–2002)

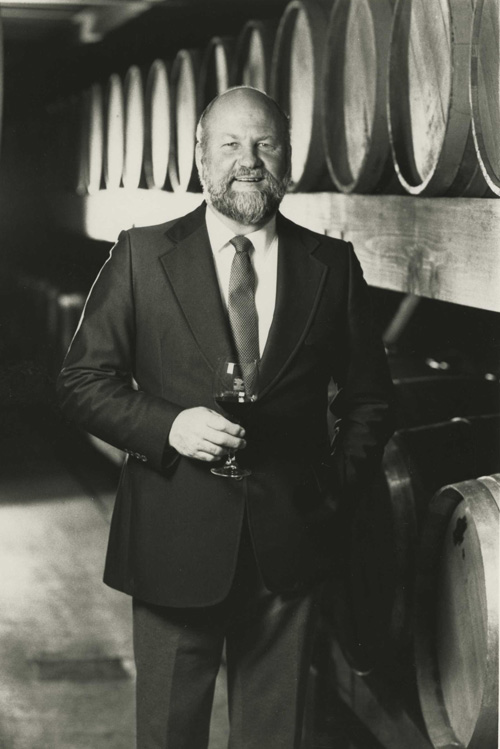
- Born: Raymond Meyer; 11 November 1938; Bakersfield, California, US
- Died: 6 August 2002 (aged 63); Sierra Nevada, US
- Occupations: Vintner and enologist
- Known for: Co-founding Silver Oak Cellars; His vast expertise in winemaking and being a major influence in the American Vineyard Foundation, which he presided in the 1990s.

Justin Meyer (born Raymond Meyer, 11 November 1938 – 6 August 2002) was an American vintner, enologist, and member of the Christian Brothers. He was the founder along with Raymond Twomey Duncan of Silver Oak Cellars in 1972, a successful winery based in the Napa Valley and Alexander Valley. Today Duncan's sons David Duncan and Tim Duncan run Silver Oak Cellars, as well as Twomey Cellars, established in 1999. Meyer sold his share of the company to Duncan in 2001. One of California's top wine experts, he was president of the American Vineyard Foundation in the 1990s and also held numerous other positions in the wine industry. The San Francisco Chronicle cites Meyer as "one of the legends of the Napa Valley".

== Background ==
Meyer was born Raymond Meyer on 11 November 1938 in Bakersfield, California. He joined the Christian Brothers shortly after graduating from high school and was given the religious name of Justin. He taught Spanish at a Christian Brothers high school in Sacramento and in 1964 was apprenticed to winemaker Brother Timothy at their winery, Greystone Cellars, in St. Helena, California in the Napa Valley. At one point the Christian Brothers ran 6 wineries and were the largest brandy producers in the world according to Meyer.

=== Career ===
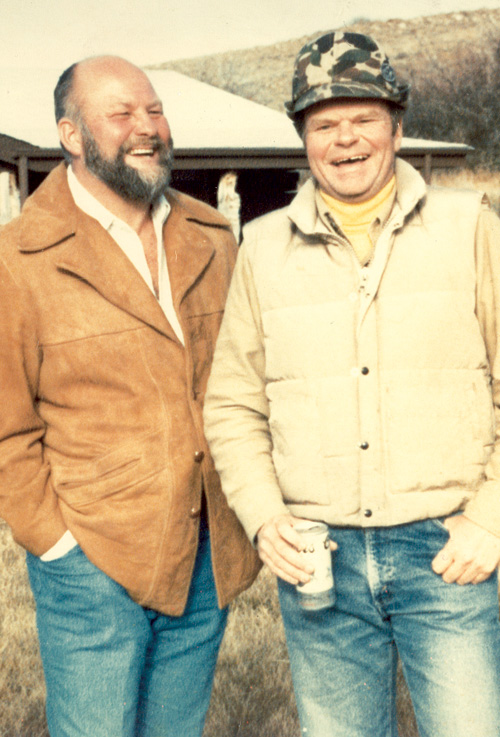
Meyer with Silver Oak Cellars co-founder, Raymond Twomey Duncan

He left the Christian Brothers in 1972, and became president of V&E Consulting and Management Company. That year, Meyer met Colorado entrepreneur Ray Duncan who had purchased a 750-acre plot of land in the Napa Valley of northern California, which was formerly the Oakville Dairy farm, as an investment in growing and selling grapes. Meyer, a winemaker who was a monk of the Christian Brothers religious order, formed an agreement, with Duncan, setting up a winery on the Christian Brother's site in St. Helena. Meyer would provide his winemaking, cultivation and Californian market expertise while Duncan provided the financial backing.

The pair bottled their first vintage Cabernet Sauvignon in 1972, aging the wine in the old Keig Dairy barn on the original plot of land Duncan purchased. They made the decision to produce only Cabernet Sauvignon and to attempt to produce the finest in the world, to age the wine exclusively in American oak barrels. Meyer said of the reason for deciding to concentrate on one wine, "it was kind of a reaction to my days at Christian Brothers, where we made so many wines it was hard to do them all right, and it was kind of in keeping with what I thought — that Cabernets were what Napa and Sonoma did best, so why not devote our attention to that. This is a pretty common concept in France." According to noted wine critic Robert Parker, Meyer always believed in harvesting ripe, physiologically mature fruit. In answer to the question of why Silver Oak insists upon aging their wines in American oak barrels, Meyer once said, "I'm happy with a cellar of about 65 degrees. Aging is speeded up by heat and slowed down by cold, but the only thing I do to modify my cellar is drink it faster... To my palate, American oak imparts less wood tannin than French oak. I like tannic wine about as much as I like tough steak."

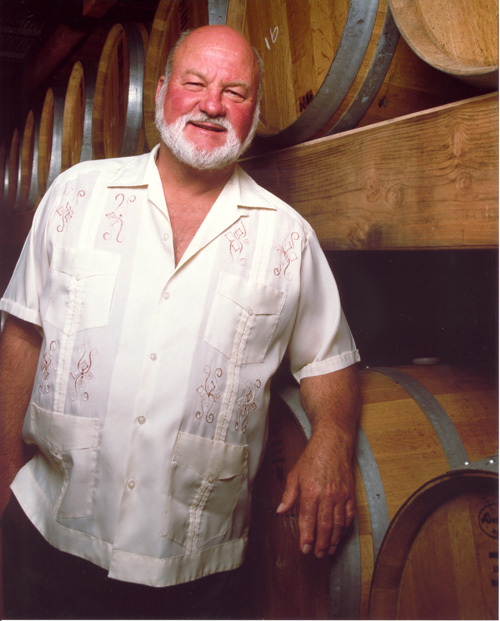
Meyer and Silver Oak's barrels

Meyer and Duncan made their first three vintages at the Christian Brothers winery, and in 1975 bought the Franciscan Winery, selling it in 1978 to buy the Silver Oak winery near Oakville and buying up new land. The Silver Oak winery began production in 1981 and the 1982 harvest was considered by Meyer to be "something special" and was attempted to be replicated in later years. Growth of the company from 1977 onwards enabled Silver Oak to purchase further vineyards in the 1980s and early 1990s, becoming one of the most successful Cabernet Sauvignon brands. By the 1994 vintage, the concept changed and the Silver Oak Napa became a blend of Cabernet Sauvignon, Cabernet Franc, Merlot and Petit Verdot, but still aged solely in American oak, a California take on the classic Bordeaux chateau-bottled red wine. Meyer was president of the American Vineyard Foundation in the 1990s, and also held several other important positions in the wine industry.

He trained Daniel Baron extensively to replace himself as Silver Oak's chief winemaker. In the late 1990s, he was diagnosed with Type-2 Diabetes and a degenerative brain disease. In January 2001, he sold his share of the company to Ray Duncan, citing health problems, but continued as a consulting winemaker until his death in August 2002. Meyer once said "Only one wine can be your best, and I felt that cabernet was what we did best in Napa and Sonoma".

== Death and legacy ==
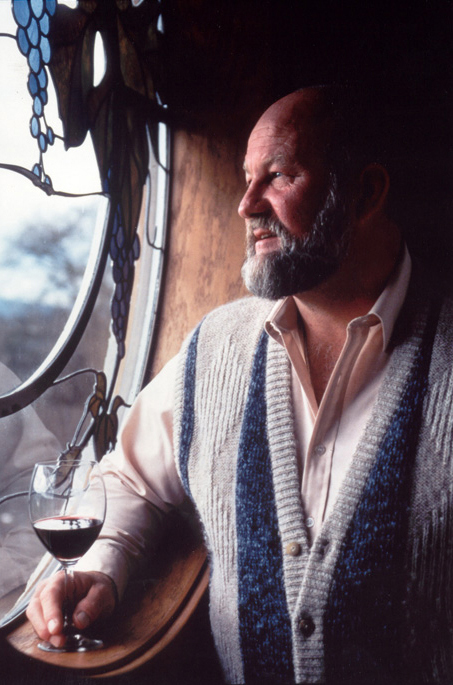
Meyer enjoying a glass of wine

Meyer died of a heart attack at the age of 63 while on vacation in the Sierra Nevada mountains near Lake Tahoe on August 6, 2002. A memorial service was held at Silver Oak four days later.

Upon his death, Jim Wolpert, the head of the department of viticulture and enology at University of California Davis said, "The debt of gratitude that we in the research community owe to him is immeasurable. He will be missed in ways that I don't think we all understand yet. There was no question about his reputation. His approach was always a no-nonsense, no-politics approach. He never let the main issues get sidetracked." John De Luca, president of the Wine Institute said "I'm not sure people truly perceive his extraordinary impact on the wine industry. He is one of the defining figures, one of the great figures in wine of our time." Patrick Gleeson, executive director of the American Vineyard Foundation, who Meyer had mentored as a young lad said, "His vision and love for wine has undoubtedly made him a living legacy amongst friends, peers and those in the industry. Justin's passing will not diminish the influence he has had on the wine industry and hopefully it will inspire others to follow in his footsteps."

He is survived by his wife, Bonny. The couple had two sons, Chad and Matt, and a daughter, Holly. Bonny Meyer operates Bonny's Vineyard, and his son Matt also operates Meyer Family Cellars, which his father helped him establish in the Yorkville Highlands of Mendocino County in January 1999.
