= Daniel Baron =

American winemaker (born 1949)

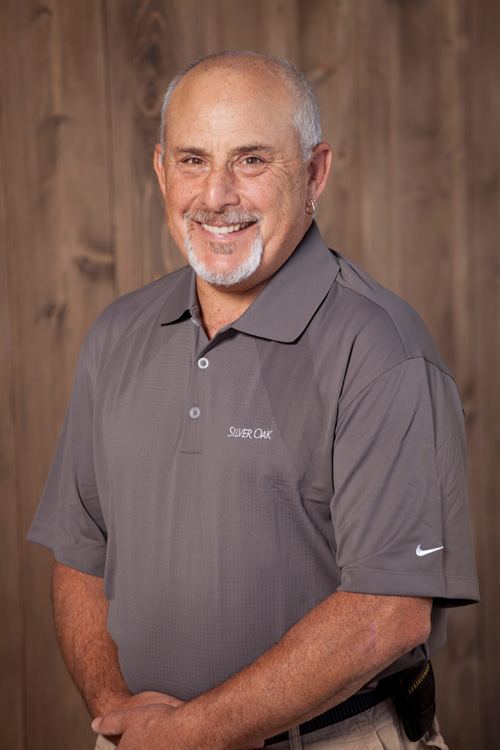
- Born: 1949 (age 76–77)
- Occupation: Winemaker

Daniel Baron (born 1949) is an American winemaker. He is best known for his work with the Duncan family-owned Silver Oak Cellars and Twomey Cellars, and was Director of Winemaking for both. After his retirement in 2017, he launched Complant Wine with his son, Sam Baron, to produce small production, artisanal, single vineyard wines. Originally a field worker for John Rolleri at Chateau Montelena, he gained experience in the Bordeaux region of France and was mentored by the likes of grape geneticist Professor Harold Olmo, and winemakers Jean-Claude Berrouet and Justin Meyer. He became general manager of Christian Moueix's Dominus Estate in the 1980s. He became winemaker for Silver Oak, an exclusive Cabernet Sauvignon producer, in 1994, and was trained by Justin Meyer to follow in his footsteps as Silver Oak's winemaker before Meyer’s retirement in 2001. In 1999, Baron was instrumental in persuading the Duncans to establish Twomey to pursue Merlot, Pinot noir, and Sauvignon blanc after discovering high quality Merlot grapes on Silver Oak’s Soda Canyon Ranch Vineyard. He has served on boards such as the American Society of Enology and Viticulture and the Napa Valley Wine Technical Group.

== Biography ==
Baron grew up on Long Island, New York. He describes himself as a "beach rat", and his first job was working as a lifeguard at Jones Beach. However, after his freshman year in college, he tested positive for mononucleosis, and was rejected for a second term as a lifeguard. Without a job, he drove to San Francisco with friends and settled in Sonoma County in 1968, and from 1971 he worked as a tractor driver and field worker under vineyard manager John Rolleri at Chateau Montelena. While working there he developed an interest in winemaking and was taught the basics of viticulture by Rolleri, who taught him how to plant, prune, and harvest. He enrolled at University of California Davis in 1974. Over four years he obtained bachelor's and master's degrees in viticulture and enology. He received Highest Honors for his Bachelor of Science, Plant Science Major before obtaining a Master of Science in Horticulture. During his studies there he was mentored by grape geneticist Professor Harold Olmo. After graduation, Baron was employed as a vineyard manager and assistant winemaker at Navarro Vineyards in the Anderson Valley.

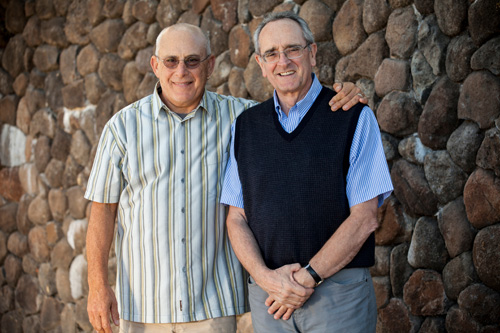
Baron with Jean-Claude Berrouet

Passionate about the art of winemaking, in 1981 Baron moved to the Bordeaux region of France to gain experience in one of the world's finest wine producing regions. He was involved in the production of two vintages in various chateaus, gaining a valuable insight into its history and in cultivating top-notch wines, changing his perception of winemaking. While in France, Daniel was hired at the legendary Chateau Petrus where he met owner Christian Moueix, winemaker Jean-Claude Berrouet, and cellarmaster Jean Veyssiere and his son Francois, who he credits with providing him detailed knowledge into the history of viticulture and the business of winemaking. Baron has said that they "taught me about wine as a part of culture and how history, quality and tradition are intertwined with the practical aspects of winemaking." Moueix is considered to be a major winemaker of the Bordeaux region of France. After a successful harvest at Chateau Petrus in 1982, Moueix established a new winery, Dominus Estate, in the Napa Valley, and asked Baron to manage the facility; he worked there until 1994. In 1994, Baron met co-founder of Silver Oak Cellars, Justin Meyer, after seeing a quirky classified ad in the newspaper Wine Country. Meyer soon began training Baron as his eventual successor, and Baron was ultimately appointed Silver Oak winemaker in 1994. Baron said of Meyer, "Justin instilled in me both pride in what Silver Oak had accomplished and the humility to realize that there is always room to improve. He constantly searched for ways to raise quality, and that’s become one of our core values at Silver Oak. Baron quickly became successful; Meyer considered the 1995 variety to be the best of the 1990s, and noted wine critic Robert M. Parker was also impressed with Silver Oak’s 1997 Napa Valley Cabernet Sauvignon.

Baron was instrumental in convincing Silver Oak owners Raymond Twomey Duncan and his sons David Duncan and Tim Duncan to establish Twomey Cellars in 1999 after discovering high-class Merlot plantings on Silver Oak’s Soda Canyon Ranch Vineyard. Baron’s goal at Twomey Cellars was to create Merlot in the French style. In 2007, Baron was made Director of Winemaking for Silver Oak Cellars and Twomey Cellars; Twomey now cultivates Pinot noir, Merlot and Sauvignon blanc.

In March 2013, Baron sailed aboard the M/S Paul Gauguin to Tahiti and the Society Islands, during which he spoke about winemaking and hosted wine tastings. Baron retired from Silver Oak and Twomey Cellars after completing the 2016 vintage. He and his winemaker son, Sam Baron, launched the Baron Family Wine, LLC to produce Complant, a small production, artisanal label. They make Napa Valley Chardonnay, Santa Lucia Highlands Pinot Noir and Napa Valley Cabernet Sauvignon in a vibrant, moderate alcohol style. Daniel is the president of Daniel Baron Consulting, which provides technical assistance on grapegrowing and winemaking in Napa, Sonoma and Mendocino Counties. In 2018 and 2019, he made three trips to Bordeaux, France to study at the Institut des Sciences de la Vigne et du Vin at the Université de Bordeaux and was the first American to receive Le Diploma Universitaire de Taille et d'Empamprage. In 2019, Baron began making the Francophone and Ode labels for Nakedwines.com producing Pinot Noir and Cabernet Sauvignon. He published the first season of his podcast, "The Winemaker's Journey" in 2020. The podcast focuses on the evolution of a winemaker's personal style as well as interview with innovative viticulturists and researchers.

== Winemaking and philosophy ==
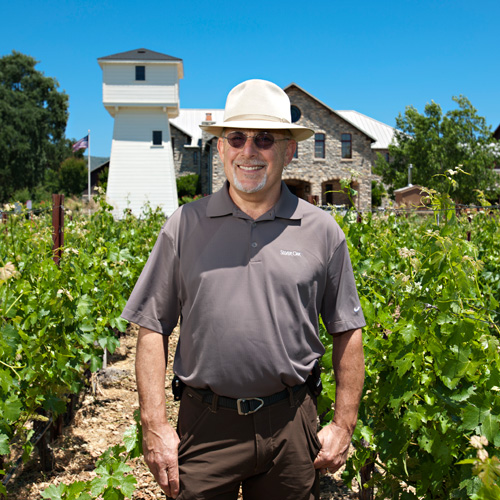
Baron walking through the vineyards at Silver Oak's Oakville winery

Baron has been outspoken on the influence of terroir, the emphasis on vineyard selection, fruit maturity, and other factors in creating Silver Oak's distinct style. Baron's Silver Oak Cabernet Sauvignon is typically aged for about 24-25 months exclusively in American oak barrels, following in the tradition of Justin Meyer. He ages Twomey's Merlot typically for 18 months in French oak barrels, and six times during the aging process the wine is racked from barrel to barrel, something known as soutirage traditionnel. Soutirage is the method of moving wine from one barrel to another using gravity rather than a pump, which can be disruptive to a wine. This process softens tannins, clarifies the wine and enhances aromatic qualities.

Baron, who describes bottling as a "traumatic time for wine", has said, "To me, wine has always been more than something to drink. My family’s love and appreciation of good food, the time I’ve spent in France and the many mentors I've had along the way have led me to an appreciation of the role wine plays in daily life as well as history and culture. To me, creating wine is one of the ways people preserve civilization." Baron has also said, "Even after years of experience, every vintage feels like a childbirth-if we remembered how much it hurt, we might never do it again. And wines are much like our children. Their personality is there from day one, and we can track it through, know its essence even if its behavior at any particular moment is off. You get a feel from all of this of where the fruit has been and where it’s going. You have to remember this when you think about judging wines. They're alive and changing moment to moment; they have good days and bad; they show well in a particular glass or with particular food. Judging a wine at any particular moment in its life is like giving a kid a letter grade based on his behavior in the supermarket."

== Reception ==
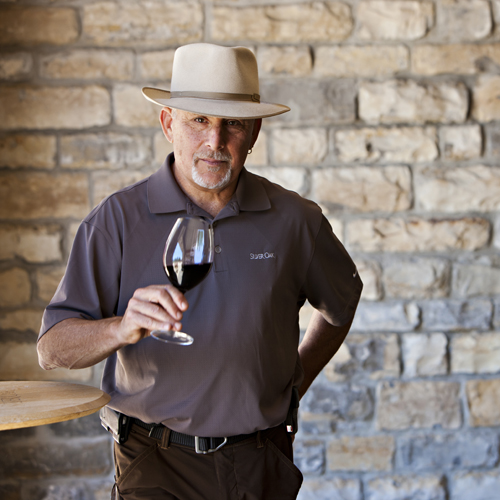
Daniel Baron

Baron’s wine has been described as an "art form," which is "known to cabernet lovers around the country." The Rough Guide to California considers Silver Oak's Cabernet Sauvignon to be the "crème de la crème of the heady red." In 2012, Wine & Spirits Magazine selected Silver Oak’s 2008 Alexander Valley Cabernet as one of the "Year’s Best Cabernet Sauvignon," which was acclaimed by critics. Sonoma Wine said Twomey’s wines are a “marriage of classical French technique and an extraordinary California vineyard, [which] results in Twomey’s distinctive, complex, and rich expression of luscious fruit.” Wine Enthusiast said of the 2008 Twomey Merlot: “made with a drop of Cabernet Franc, this Merlot is rich, smooth and bone dry. With modest alcohol, it brims with flavors of black and red currant, licorice, anise and white pepper, as well as a subtle touch of sweet, smoky new oak. The grapes come from the cool Soda Canyon area of Napa Valley, at the base of Atlas Peak. Twomey's 2009 Russian River Valley Pinot noir was awarded first place in the American Wine Society's National Tasting Project in 2012. Eric Asimov of The New York Times cited Twomey's 2009 Anderson Valley Pinot noir as "one of our favorites, bigger and softer but with both finesse and intensity."

== Personal life ==
Baron resides in Napa, California, with his wife, Gwyneth; they have three children together who are now of adult age. He has been active on boards such as the American Society of Enology and Viticulture, the Napa Valley Wine Technical Group, Congregation Beth Sholom and the Napa Valley Youth Symphony, and is a keen surfer, sailor, snowboarder, martial artist and mandolin player in his spare time.
