= Jean-Claude Berrouet =

French winemaker

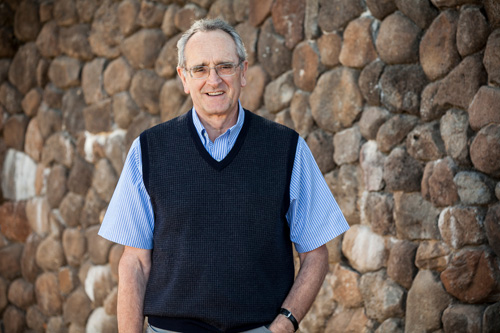
Jean-Claude Berrouet

Jean-Claude Berrouet is a French winemaker. World-renowned in his field and in Merlot production, he is best known for his work with Jean Pierre Moueix at the famous Chateau Petrus and Dominus Estate, also owned by the Moueix family. The Oakland Tribune considers Petrus under Berrouet to be "arguably one of the world's most revered and most expensive wines." He is known for making wines of subtlety and nuance that are considered the counterpoint of Michel Rolland.

== Biography ==
Berrouet was born into a Basque family in the Bordeaux region of France. From his schooldays he was a close friend of Jean Brana at Saint-Jean Pied-du-Port. He became winemaker and technical director for Établissements Jean-Pierre Moueix in 1964. There he was responsible for the production of their complete range of wines, such as Pomerol and St. Emilion. He produced some 44 vintages for Établissements, working at estates such as Chateau Magdelaine, Trotanoy and the famous Chateau Petrus. He has been cited as a "great talent" of enology. He achieved fame with his work at Chateau Petrus in particular, where he worked for over forty years. Noted wine critic Larry Walker said that under Berrouet, the "wines have shown a huge improvement, becoming much more supple. The Oakland Tribune considers Petrus under Berrouet to be "arguably one of the world's most revered and most expensive wines." Berrouet is considered to be one of the foremost proponents of "classicist" winemaking, in that his wines are balanced, true to their origins and capable of longer ageing.

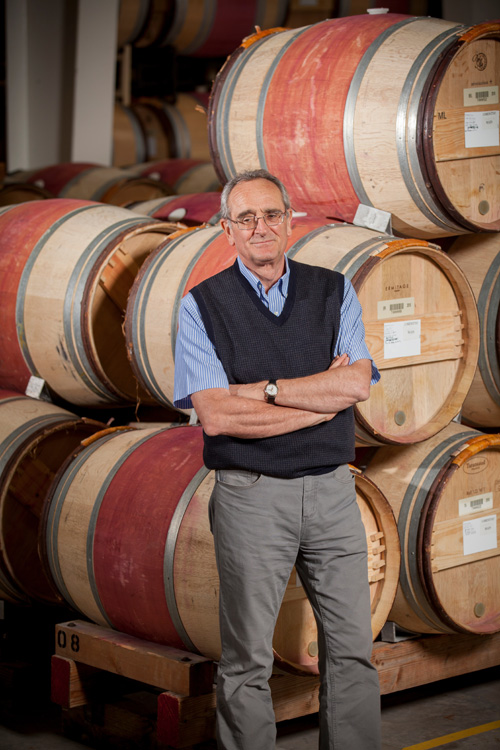
Jean-Claude Berrouet

Berrouet began working for Dominus Estate as a technical consultant under Christian Moueix in the 1980s. He was chief winemaker, and was heavily involved from its outset in 1982, producing its first vintage in 1983. In May 2012, Twomey Cellars announced that they had hired Berrouet to assist Daniel Baron in the production of Twomey's Napa Valley Merlot. Baron said of Berrouet's decision to join Twomey, "Much of my style of winemaking is based on his aesthetic. In fact, I often credit my time with him as one of the inspirations that led to Twomey Cellars. Jean-Claude knows how to combine subtlety, intensity and balance in a wine and his joy of living comes through in every glass." Berrouet has also mentored numerous other notable winemakers over the years with his deep knowledge of viticulture, including Yamlick Reyrel. Berrouet has said, "A wine should tell you the story of the place it came from. Innovation and change are important, but there should be limits on techniques that a winemaker can use and still have a wine classified as a Bordeaux. If I'm a conductor playing Mozart, can I add notes to it? Pretentious men do this. As long as I can make a living doing what I do, I will resist the move to a standard taste."

Berrouet retired formally from winemaking in 2007, but with the help of his son, Jean-François Berrouet, he has continued work as technical consultant for wineries in Israel, Argentina, China and France. The Petrus Estate, as of 2010, it now run by Jean Pierre Moueix's son Jean-François Moueix, and Berrouet's other son, Olivier Berrouet, is Director of Winemaking. Berrouet also owns the 6 hectare Vieux Chateau St-Andre in Montagne St Emilion, which he runs with his son Jean-François. Upon his retirement, Christian Moueix said "Jean-Claude Berrouet's contribution has not only been lengthy, but also, immeasurable. With a lifelong passion in poetry as well as wine, his philosophy has been for the wines to express their terroir, always favoring elegance over extraction."
