= Ovid Napa Valley =

Coordinates: 38.461286°N 122.343007°W

- Location: Oakville, California, USA
- Appellation: Napa Valley AVA
- Founded: 2000
- First vintage: 2005
- Key people: Mark Nelson and Dana Johnson (founders), Austin Peterson (winemaker), Jack Bittner (managing partner)
- Parent company: Silver Oak Cellars
- Varietals: Cabernet Sauvignon, Cabernet Franc, Petit Verdot, Merlot, Syrah
- Website: http://www.ovidnapavalley.com/

Ovid Napa Valley is a winery in Pritchard Hill, to the northeast of Oakville in the Napa Valley of California. It was established in 2000. The area, in one of the rockiest parts of the Napa Valley with iron-red and yellow soils, typically produces earthy varieties of Cabernet Sauvignon and Cabernet Franc. Ovid winery is solar-powered and organically farmed and has been certified "Napa Green" by the Napa County Department of Public Works and the California Green Business Program. In 2017, a majority share of Ovid was sold to the Duncan family, who own Silver Oak Cellars and Twomey Cellars.

== History ==
Ovid is named after the Roman poet Publius Ovidius Naso, who lived from 43 BC to 17 AD, and wrote an epic poem of some 12,000 lines, Metamorphoses. The name was originally given to Ovid Technologies, a software business in New York which Ovid Napa Valley founder Mark Nelson had established in the late 1980s. Nelson sold the company in 1998 and bought up property on Pritchard Hill, to the east of Oakville, California, with his wife, Dana Johnson. Chappellet Winery has existed on Pritchard Hill since the late 1960s, and neighbor David Arthur Vineyards has been in operation since the early 1980s. Due to its high quality, expensive wines, Pritchard Hill has been described by James Laube of Wine Spectator as "Napa's Rodeo Drive."

Ovid planted 15 acres of mainly Cabernet Sauvignon and Cabernet Franc grapes in 2000. It was designed by Howard Backen, who also designed Continuum Estate on Pritchard Hill. The winery, which uses dark wood tones, is solar-powered and is organically farmed. It has been certified "Napa Green" by the Napa County Department of Public Works and the California Green Business Program. It officially opened in 2003.

In 2017, a majority share of Ovid was sold to the Duncan family, who own Silver Oak Cellars and Twomey Cellars, for reportedly around $50 million. There are no immediate plans to increase output or change prices.

== Operations ==
Ovid Napa Valley vineyards are situated on Pritchard Hill to the northeast of Oakville, California, at an elevation of 1,100 feet (340 m) to 1,200 feet (370 m). They are divided into two parcels, the larger of which borders David Arthur Vineyards and the smallest, Martinez Winery. The area is one of the rockiest parts of the Napa Valley, with iron-red and yellow soils. Due to the terrain, it is difficult to cultivate the vineyards. Former Winemaker Andy Erickson stated that: "There is something in the chemical makeup of those soils that gives the wines a gravel, mineral character that is unique."

Ovid hired viticulturist David Abreu as the vineyard manager upon its inception. Andy Erickson was the founding winemaker while Michel Rolland is their consulting winemaker. Austin Peterson began as an assistant winemaker to Erickson in 2006 and was appointed chief winemaker five years later.

Ovid's cellar is small, holding two vintages at a time. It is set in a small cave, about 20 feet (6.1 m) into the rock hillside. After being harvested, the grapes flow directly from harvest trucks into fermentation tanks that are underground.

The wines ferment in both in oak barrel and concrete. The first wines produced at Ovid in 2005 and 2006 were aged in 100% oak to prevent the risk of bringing in outside bacteria. New oak dropped to about 90% in 2007 and as of 2017 was in the low 80s.

== Wines ==
Ovid typically produces 1000 to 1200 cases annually. Less than 100 cases of Syrah are typically produced for "fun" from only about half an acre, a red wine with a very dark core.

Ovid wines are typically earthy in flavor due to the terrain, which produces fruit that is typically chewier and denser. Antonio Galloni of Vinous stated that 2005 Ovid was characterized by "New leather, smoke, tobacco, mint and savory herbs," with "hints of mocha, blackberry jam and dark spices wrap around the fleshy finish." 2006 was a strong year for Ovid, due to a particularly warm summer. Antonio Galloni described 2006 Ovid as "powerful, intense," with "Mocha, espresso, dark cherries, spice and tobacco [which] add aromatic nuance." 2007 Ovid is creamier, with mocha and chocolate taste, while 2008 Ovid is characterized by blackberry jam, exotic spices, black cherry, menthol, licorice and lavender. 2009 Ovid is described as "voluptous," a creamy blend with "hints of sweet tobacco, menthol and licorice" and 2010 as having a "sense of energy and thrust," with "Black cherry jam, chocolate, plum and mocha." In 2010, Ovid released Loc-Cit, a selection of their best Cabernet Sauvignon. 2011 Ovid is described by Galloni as "silky," 2012 as "bold, racy, with "red cherry, pomegranate, smoke, licorice and tobacco," and 2013 as "dark, powerful and vertical in its sense of structure." Ovid 2015 Hexameter Red Wine is a blend of 65% Cabernet Franc, 21% Cabernet Sauvignon, 10% Merlot and 4% Petit Verdot.
