= Clendenen =

Clendenen or Clendennen is a surname. Notable people with the surname include:

- Clarence C. Clendenen (1899–1977), American historian
- Jim Clendenen (1953–2021), American winemaker
- John Clendennen, Irish politician
- Mike Clendenen (born 1963), American football player
