= Carol Shelton =

American winemaker

- Citizenship: United States
- Education: Enology, University of California
- Occupations: Winemaker; Entrepreneur
- Years active: 1978-present
- Employer: Shelton-Mackenzie Wine Company
- Known for: Carol Shelton Wines
- Notable work: Zinfandel wine
- Spouse: Mitch Mackenzie
- Awards: San Francisco Chronicle Wine Maker of the Year (2005)
- Website: www.carolshelton.com

Carol Shelton is an American winemaker and entrepreneur. She has been called the most awarded winemaker in America and was the San Francisco Chronicle's Winemaker of the Year in 2005.

== Personal life and education ==
Shelton was raised in Rochester, New York and San Mateo, California. When she was a child, Shelton's mother created a memory game based around smells, Shelton credits this game as helping her have a skill in chemistry and a good nose. Shelton wanted to be a paleontologist when she was ten years old. In high school she decided to become a poet. Shelton studied poetry at University of California, Davis but remained undeclared in her major. When she was a Freshman she took a tour of Sebastiani Winery. The smell of the wine cellar at Sebastiani triggered her interest in winemaking and she decided to study enology and received her degree in 1978. She was one of the first women to graduate with a degree in Enology. She worked on the Aroma Wheel project under Ann C. Noble and researched yeast strains and wine.

== Career ==
After graduation, she started working at Robert Mondavi Winery. She then worked in Australia for Saltrams Wines. At Mondavi, and other wineries, she wasn't allowed to work in the cellars with the men winemakers. She almost went back to being a poet. In 1980, she started doing lab work with Andre Tchelistcheff at Buena Vista Winery, whom she credited with re-instating her interest in being a winemaker. The following year she worked for Sonoma Vineyards. In 1991 she became winemaker at Windsor Vineyards. It was at Windsor where she developed a strong interest in Zinfandel wine. She worked at Windsor for nineteen years. Shelton left Windsor after not feeling recognized and acknowledging that the "Management was pretty male dominated and not supportive," of her work. The winery was awarded the Golden Winery Award in 1996 from the California State Fair, and despite being the winemaker for the winery, she was not acknowledged for the award. During her tenure at Windsor she made 45 different wines. In 2000, Shelton and her husband, Mitch Mackenzie, started Shelton-Mackenzie Wine Company. The company manages a wine label and a consulting firm called Vincare. Shelton served on the board of Zinfandel Advocate Producers from 1994 to 1998.

=== Carol Shelton Wines ===
Shelton-Mackenzie Wine Company distributes Shelton's namesake label, Carol Shelton Wines. They make Zinfandel wine from single vineyard grapes. Their Zinfandel's are called Wild Thing, Karma Zin, Black Magic Late Harvest Zinfandel, and Monga Zin. The Monga Zin grapes come from dry farmed old vine grapes from the Cucamonga Valley AVA. The Wild Thing is made from wild yeasts and uses grapes from Mendocino County, California. Karma Zin uses old vines that are over 100 years old and come from the Russian River Valley AVA. It is 85 percent Zinfandel and a remaining blend of Alicante Bouschet, Carignane and Petite Sirah. They also produce rosé, and a dessert wine. Their rosé has been labeled as Rendezvous Rosé and Mendocino County Dry Rosé. The 2007 vintage was made from 100% Carignane. As of 2008, they have produced Coquille Blanc, a blend of Grenache blanc, Roussanne, and Viognier. The label produces a total of 15,000 cases a year. The labels on the wine show a female character that Shelton describes as her "alter-ego." Their tasting room and production space are located in an industrial park in Santa Rosa, California.

=== Awards ===
She has been the recipient of numerous awards in the wine industry. Wines that Shelton has made have been awarded first place at the California State Fair.

- 1993, Bon Appétit's Andre Tchelistcheff Winemaker of the Year
- 1996, Jerry Mead's Winemaker of the Year
- 1996, Golden Winery Award, California State Fair
- 1999, Dan Berger's Winemaker of the Year
- 2005, San Francisco Chronicle Winemaker of the Year
