= Rancho San Juan Cajón de Santa Ana =

Coordinates: 33.860°N 117.890°W

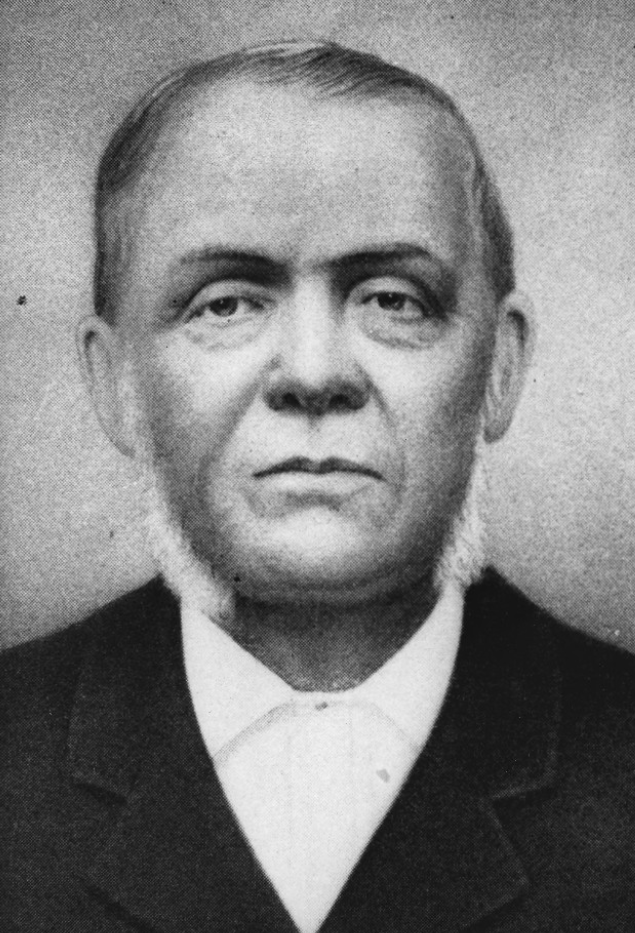
In 1837, Juan Pacífico Ontiveros was granted Rancho San Juan Cajón de Santa Ana, which included all of modern-day Anaheim, Fullerton, and Placentia.

Rancho San Juan Cajón de Santa Ana was a 35,971-acre (145.57 km^{2}) Mexican land grant in present-day Orange County, California.

The grant was given in 1837 by Governor Juan Alvarado to Juan Pacífico Ontiveros. The grant encompassed the present-day cities of Anaheim, Fullerton, and Placentia.

== History ==
Juan Pacifico Ontiveros (1795–1877) was a corporal at the Mission San Gabriel Arcángel and later mayordomo (foreman) of Mission San Juan Capistrano. In 1825, Ontiveros married María Martina Osuna (1809–1898), step daughter of Tomás Olivera, grantee of Rancho Tepusquet.

With the cession of California to the United States following the Mexican–American War, the 1848 Treaty of Guadalupe Hidalgo provided that the land grants would be honored. As required by the Land Act of 1851, a claim for Rancho San Juan Cajón de Santa Ana was filed with the Public Land Commission in 1852, and the grant was patented to Juan Patricio Ontiveras in 1877.

In 1853, Ontiveros sold 21,527 acres (87.1 km^{2}) to Abel Stearns. In 1855, Ontiveros bought Rancho Tepusquet, in present-day northern Santa Barbara County, from his father-in-law Tomás Olivera. In 1856, he moved to Rancho Tepusquet, constructed an adobe house and lived there until his death.

In 1857, Ontiveros sold 1,160 acres (4.7 km^{2}) that would become Anaheim, to George Hansen who was working for 50 German-American families from the San Francisco Bay Area.

Juan Nicolas Ontiveros and Patricio Ontiveros had remained on Rancho San Juan Cajón de Santa Ana. In 1863, Juan Pacifico gave them 3,900 acres (16 km^{2}) of Ranch San Juan Cajón de Santa Ana. At this time, they were both married. Juan Nicolas and Patricio did not keep their share very long, and in 1864, both deeded their share to their brother-in-law, Augustus Langenberger (married Pietra Ontiveros). In 1865, Daniel Kraemer started the influx of settlers to Placentia, when he purchased 3,900 acres (16 km^{2}).

== See also ==
- List of Ranchos of California
- Ranchos of California
- Ranchos of Orange County, California
