= Silver Oak Cellars =

Winery in California

Coordinates: 38°26′26″N 122°22′52″W

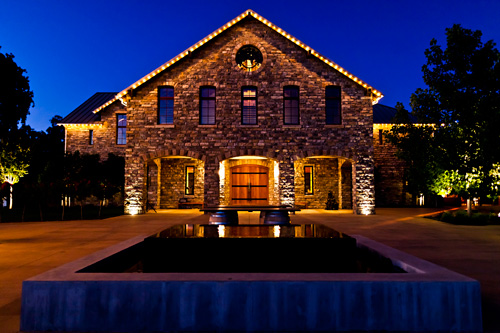
- Location: Oakville, California; Healdsburg, California, USA
- Appellation: Napa Valley AVA; Alexander Valley AVA
- Founded: 1972
- First vintage: 1972
- Key people: Founders Ray Duncan and Justin Meyer; David Duncan, President and CEO, Tim Duncan, Executive Vice President; Nate Weis, Director of Winemaking
- Varietal: Cabernet Sauvignon
- Website: http://www.silveroak.com/

Silver Oak Cellars is a family-owned, California winery dedicated to producing only Cabernet Sauvignon. Silver Oak was established in 1972 by Ray Duncan and Justin Meyer. It is currently operated by Ray's sons David Duncan, who serves as the president and CEO, and his brother, Tim Duncan, who serves as executive vice president. Silver Oak has two wineries; one in Oakville in the Napa Valley and one in Healdsburg in the Alexander Valley. The Duncan Family also established Twomey Cellars in 1999, which has wineries in Calistoga and Healdsburg.

In 2007, the ColoradoBiz cited Silver Oak as one of a dozen California wineries which "have reached cult status" for its Cabernet Sauvignon production and occupies an "important niche in California's wine industry." In 2016, Silver Oak's Oakville winery became the first commercial winery in the world to earn the U.S. Green Building Council's LEED (Leadership in Energy and Environmental Design) Platinum Certification for efficient energy use; their Alexander Valley winery was also granted the certification in the "new building" category in 2018.

== History ==
Silver Oak was the vision of Justin Meyer. Entrepreneur and oil entrepreneur, Ray Duncan had purchased Franciscan Vineyards and approached Justin Meyer, whom he had met through mutual friends, and asked him to plant and manage his vineyards and winery. While working at Christian Brothers, Justin agreed, and started Silver Oak on the side. Ray invested in Meyer and Silver Oak was established in 1972. Named after its location between Oakville and the Silverado Trail in Napa Valley, Justin and Ray's vision for Silver Oak was to devote all their resources to producing a single wine and Justin's favorite focus - Cabernet Sauvignon. Justin's vision was to perfect and make a wine that was 100% Cabernet, no blending.

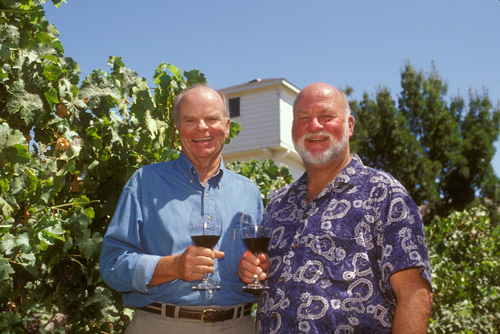
Founders, Ray Duncan and Justin Meyer

In 1972, Ray purchased a dairy farm in Oakville, in the Napa Valley, which is the site where the Silver Oak Napa Valley winery stands today. It was on this dairy farm in 1972 where Silver Oak's first vintage was produced using grapes from Silver Oak's Alexander Valley vineyards. That same year, Ray and Justin began planting Silver Oak's first Napa Valley vineyard. Seven years later, Silver Oak harvested the grapes for the company's first Napa Valley Cabernet Sauvignon. Silver Oak produced 1,600 cases of 1972 North Coast Cabernet Sauvignon, Silver Oak's first wine. However, according to David Duncan, quoted in 2007, the company didn't sell wine for the first five years but then sold out for 28 years consecutively, and the company has continued to grow. In 1981, on the site of the old dairy farm in Oakville, Silver Oak broke ground on their Napa Valley winery which was completed in 1982. Growth of the company from 1977 onwards enabled Silver Oak to purchase further vineyards in the 1980s and early 1990s, becoming one of the most successful Cabernet Sauvignon brands of the 1980s. In 1994, Justin Meyer brought on Daniel Baron to become his successor. Daniel Baron has served as Silver Oak's Director of Winemaking since 2001.

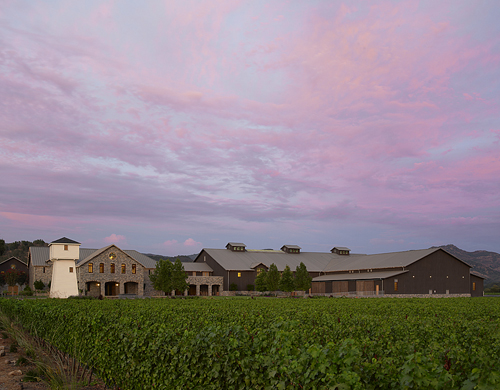
Silver Oak Cellars, Oakville.

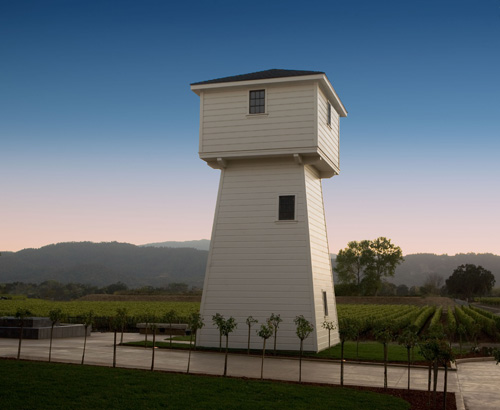
Historic tower, Oakville.

After being approached by numerous large scale alcohol industries with offers to buy Silver Oak, the partners decided they had different visions for the winery. As Justin's son, Matthew Meyer was starting a small production winery on the side - Meyer Family Cellars - in January 2001, co-founder Justin Meyer sold his share of the company to Ray Duncan. Soon after, Justin Meyer died on August 6, 2002, and was commemorated in the Culinary Institute of America's Vintner Hall of Fame at Greystone in Saint Helena. Larry Walker of Wines & Vines accredited Meyer with making important contributions in uniting growers and winemakers, reviving the American Vineyard Foundation, where he served as president, and catapulting the California wine industry to a leading player on the world stage.

On New Years Day 2006, the Oakville winery experienced a major flood from the Napa River. The following month, on February 2, 2006, the Oakville winery was devastated by a fire which destroyed the dairy barn, the original structure on the property. The Duncan Family decided to rebuild the Oakville winery from the ground up, which was completed in October 2008. The rebuild included using some 550 tons of reclaimed stone from a 115-year-old dismantled mill in Coffeyville, Kansas, installing 1,464 solar panels to generate solar power for the facility, elevating the property 4.5 feet above the flood plain and moving their iconic water tower 12 feet. The Duncan Family also salvaged the two stained glass windows in the original winery that had been created by local artist Diane Peterson in the theme of the Napa Valley. Peterson was asked during the rebuilding to create two further stained glass windows—four windows in total which represent the four seasons. In the tasting room is a glass-house library, built from white oak which had previously been a barn in Missouri, displaying Silver Oak wines dating back to the 1970s. Upon appointment, visitors can be taken on a "Silver Tour and Taste" or a Silver Tour and Food Pairing, featuring foods prepared by winery Chef Dominic Orsini.

In August 2012, Silver Oak announced the acquisition of Sausal Vineyard and Winery in the Alexander Valley known for its zinfandel-based wines and variety of soils which had not been previously available to Silver Oak. The aim of the purchase was to use the land (75 acres planted in vines) to expand Silver Oak's Cabernet Sauvignon production. In March 2014, Silver Oak Cellars was visited by Hollywood A-listers Drew Barrymore, Reese Witherspoon, and Cameron Diaz. In July 2014, a second generation Napa Valley winemaker Nate Weis joined the firm. On August 24, Silver Oak was affected by the 2014 South Napa earthquake, although $32,500 worth of wine was saved thanks to Duncan's decision to install steadier four-barrel racks after the 2006 fire in anticipation of a future earthquake.

In 2017, the Duncan family purchased Napa Valley's Ovid winery, with 15 acres of vineyards set in Pritchard Hill. They also signed an agreement with the San Francisco Giants, becoming their first official wine partner.

== Vineyards ==
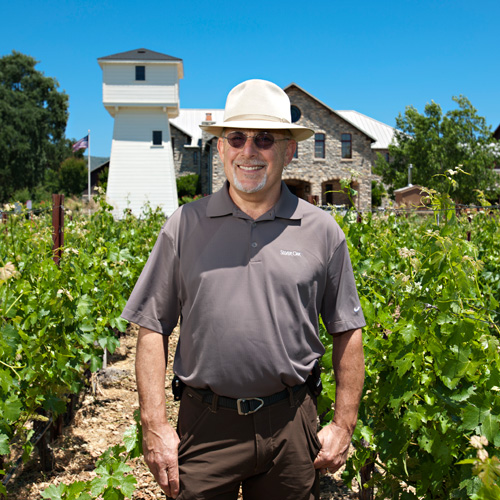
Winemaker Daniel Baron walking through the vineyards at Silver Oak's Oakville winery

Fruit for Silver Oak's Cabernet Sauvignon is sourced from estate-owned vineyards in the Napa and Alexander Valleys, and from independent partner growers who have a contract with Silver Oak to grow grapes for them. The backbone of Silver Oak's Napa Valley Cabernet Sauvignon comes from Silver Oak's 113 acre Soda Canyon Ranch Vineyard in the Napa Valley where Silver Oak grows Cabernet Sauvignon, Merlot, Cabernet Franc, Petit Verdot and Malbec grapes. Silver Oak also owns Jump Rock Vineyard, an 18-acre vineyard with rusty-red, rocky soils dedicated to Cabernet Sauvignon. In St. Helena, Silver Oak farms the small 8 acre Navone Vineyard. Its gravelly loam soils help to produce Cabernet Sauvignon and Petit Syrah. In Alexander Valley, all of Silver Oak's vineyards are dedicated to growing Cabernet Sauvignon. In 1987, Silver Oak purchased an 80-acre vineyard they named Miraval, the cornerstone of Silver Oak's Alexander Valley Cabernet Sauvignon. Miraval Vineyard sits at an elevation of 200–350 feet with clay and sandy loam soils. In the southern end of the valley, near the course of the Russian River, Silver Oak cultivates the 45 acre Red Tail Vineyard, which they purchased in 1988. It has clay and sandy loam soils at an elevation of 320–340 feet. In 2012 Duncan bought the 113-acre former Sausal Winery. In 2018 Silver Oak acquired two more vineyards in the area: Big River and Crazy Creek.

== Winemaking ==
Silver Oak Cabernet Sauvignon is aged for about 25 months exclusively in American oak barrels. Silver Oak's Alexander Valley wines are aged in both new and once-used American oak barrels and spend an additional 14 months in bottle before release. Silver Oak's Napa Valley Cabernet Sauvignon is aged in only new American oak barrels and spends about 20 months in bottle after barrel. In answer to the question of why Silver Oak insists upon aging their wines in American oak barrels, Meyer once said, "I'm happy with a cellar of about 65 degrees. Aging is speeded up by heat and slowed down by cold, but the only thing I do to modify my cellar is drink it faster... To my palate, American oak imparts less wood tannin than French oak. I like tannic wine about as much as I like tough steak." The company formed a partnership with Missouri-based barrel producer A&K Cooperage in 2000 to have a steady supply of American oak barrels made to Silver Oak's specifications. In 2015, Silver Oak acquired A&K, becoming the first winery in the United States to own an American cooperage. Silver Oak now has full control of its barrel production, and have officially called it "The Oak Cooperage".

== Reception ==
In 2007 the Colorado Biz cited Silver Oak as one of a dozen California wineries which "have reached cult status" for its Cabernet Sauvignon production and occupies an "important niche in California's wine industry." The popularity of the wines means that their new releases are eagerly awaited, cited by The California Directory of Fine Wineries as a "ritual for connoisseurs", and people often camp out overnight to be at the front of the queues. In his review of the Silver Oak Cabernet Sauvignon, noted wine critic Robert Parker called Silver Oak winery a "superb Cabernet producer." Orange Coast Magazine cited Silver Oak's Alexander Valley Cabernet Sauvignon as a "beautiful, complex contemporary wine with more than enough polish to stand up to the classics." The Rough Guide to California considers Silver Oak's Cabernet Sauvignon to be the "crème de la crème of the heady red." Frommer's said that the firm was "long known for producing the go-to cabernet for label-conscious big spenders", and Lonely Planet cited the wine as "one of those names that you bring to the dinner table to turn heads" and added that it was "pricey, yes, but legendary." Philip Goldsmith described Silver Oak as a "temple for red-wine lovers," highlighting the "powerful, velvety" taste and "unusual aroma," resulting from aging in exclusive American oak barrels. Peg Melnik and Tim Fish described the wine as an "art form," which is "known to cabernet lovers around the country." In 2012, Wine & Spirits Magazine selected Silver Oak's 2008 Alexander Valley Cabernet as one of "Year’s Best Cabernet Sauvignon," which was acclaimed by critics. In 2016, Oprah Winfrey cited 2012 Alexander Valley Cabernet Sauvignon on her annual "Favorite Things" list.

== Technology and sustainability ==
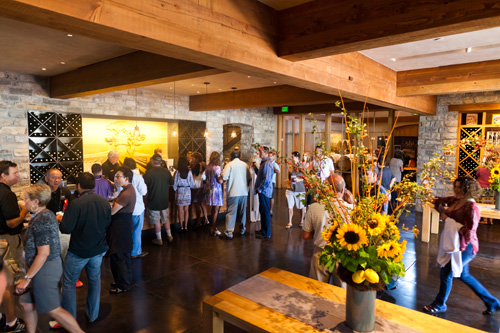
Interior of the winery at Oakville

Silver Oak has considered sustainable methods important since its inception. The Duncan Family states that the company's livelihood and future livelihood depend upon the "ecological viability of the land" and contribute to a better quality grape and wine. The new winery in Oakville, built using reclaimed materials, features 1464 solar panels which provide far more energy than the winery needs and results in 292,000 kilowatt hours sent back to the municipal power grid. The building itself was designed to increase energy efficiency and features a fermentation room with a natural air conditioning system. This system expels hot air, allowing cool night air to enter while the room's large windows and thick walls regulate temperature. The Napa Winery is Green Business certified under the Napa Green Winery Program, administered by the Napa County Department of Environmental Management (DEM), and the Association of Bay Area Government's (ABAG) Green Business Program, meeting the requirements of environmentally sustainable farming such a soil, water and energy conservation.

In the vineyard, Silver Oak practices Integrated Pest Management to regulate harmful pests and have installed nesting boxes in their vineyards for bluebirds and owls to help control pests. Between vine rows, Silver Oak grows cover crops to aid in the growth of organic matter, reduce weed growth, help retain soil nutrients and improve soil structure. Their irrigation system in the vineyards is regulated with soil moisture and plant stress monitors to conserve water application. Silver Oak's Soda Canyon Ranch, Miraval, Calistoga, and Geysersville vineyards have been awarded the Fish Friendly Farming Certification, which is awarded to agricultural properties which help restore fish and wildlife habitat and improve the quality of water.

In 2016, Silver Oak's Oakville winery became the world's first production winery to be granted LEED (Leadership in Energy and Environmental Design) Platinum Certification under the Existing Buildings, Operation and Maintenance (EB:OM) rating system – the highest level of certification granted by the U.S. Green Building Council (USGBC) for efficient energy use. Its membrane bioreactor treats an average of 4700 gallons a day during the winemaking process, and allows for the water to be reused for cleaning tanks and flushing the toilets. The winery employs a CO_{2} heat pump for sanitizing water and over 2500 solar panels for energy, storing it in batteries. In 2018, the Alexander Valley winery achieved LEED Platinum certification for its new Alexander Valley facility, the first in the world to attain it in the category of "new construction." According to Bloomberg the facility uses "zero toxic materials, solar panels, pure, filtered air, salvaged redwood siding from old 1930s wine tanks and is "wrapped in a sleekly modern, barn-style building".

In 2009, Silver Oak's Associate Winemaker Christiane Schleussner, working with Carlos Macku, Lesa Gonzalez, Ana Cristina Mesquita and Leonard C. Kirch at Cork Supply USA and Cork Supply Portugal, pioneered the commercial sensory evaluation method known as "dry cork sensory screening" for detecting the chemical compound TCA (2,4,6-trichloroanisol), which is responsible for cork taint.
