= Rancho Tepusquet =

Land grant in California

Coordinates: 34.900°N 120.260°W

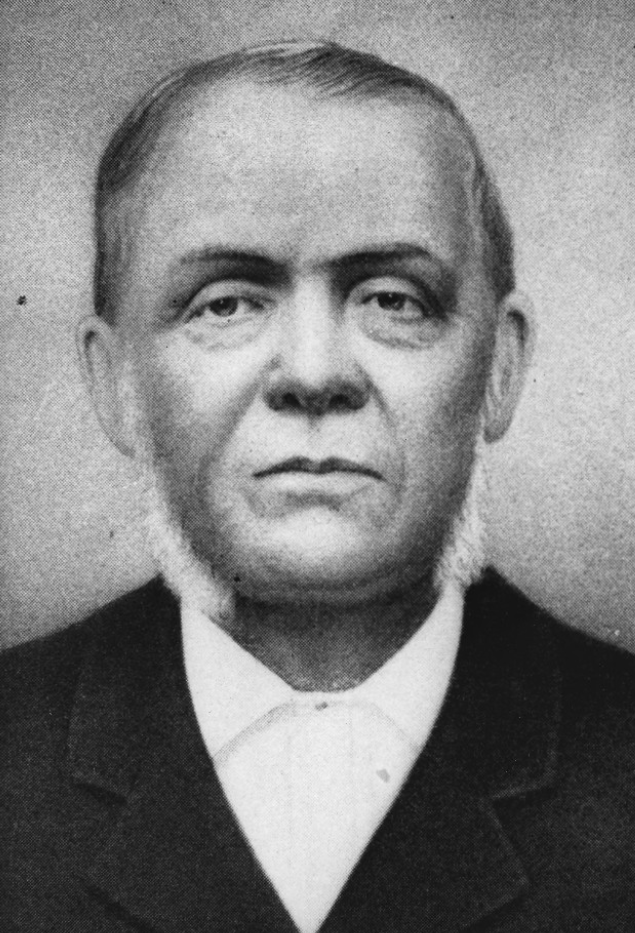
In 1855, Juan Pacífico Ontiveros purchased Rancho Tepusquet, which included all of modern-day Sisquoc and Garey.

Rancho Tepusquet was a 8,901-acre (36.02 km^{2}) Mexican land grant in present-day northern Santa Barbara County, California given in 1837 by Governor Juan B. Alvarado to Tomás Olivera. The grant extended along the Sisquoc River and encompassed present day Sisquoc and Garey, northeast of Los Alamos.

== History ==
Tomás Olivera (1787–1848) married María Antonia Cota (1793–) in 1816. By her previous marriage, María Antonia Cota had daughters: María Martina Osuna (who married Juan Pacifico Ontiveros of Rancho San Juan Cajón de Santa Ana in 1825) and Eduarda Osuna (who married Benjamin Foxen of Rancho Tinaquaic in 1831). Tomás Olivera was superintendent of three mission ranches - La Purisima, Santa Ines and Santa Barbara. Tomás Olivera was granted the two square league Rancho Tepusquet in 1837, and died in 1848.

With the cession of California to the United States following the Mexican-American War, the 1848 Treaty of Guadalupe Hidalgo provided that the land grants would be honored. As required by the Land Act of 1851, a claim for Rancho Tepusquet was filed with the Public Land Commission in 1852, and the grant was patented to María Antonia Cota et al., heirs of Tomás Olivera in 1871.

In 1855, the heirs of Tomás Olivera sold Rancho Tepusquet to step daughter, María Martina Osuna (1809–1898) and son-in-law Juan Pacifico Ontiveros (1795–1877). Juan Pacifico Ontiveros moved to Rancho Tepusquet in 1856, and constructed an adobe on the property, where he lived until his death. Today the adobe is the center of Bien Nacido Vineyards. The Ontiveros family has remained prominent in the Tepusquet region of Santa Barbara County well into the 20th Century.

== See also ==
- Ranchos of California
- List of Ranchos of California
