= Poderi Colla =

Italian winery

Coordinates: 44.669968°N 8.0638882°E

Poderi Colla is an Italian winery, based in Barolo, Piedmont, Italy. It was established by Ernesto "Tino" Colla and his niece Federica in 1993. Poderi Colla has three vineyards covering some 70 acres, Cascina Drago and Tenuta Dardi Le Rase in Barolo and Tenuta Roncaglie in Barbaresco. Wine Opus described the wines as "impressive, traditional-leaning wines", describing their Barolo Bussia as "a firm, powerful expression of Nebbiolo", but said that their Barbaresco Roncaglie "shows more finesse and elegance". Cincinnati Magazine described their 2002 Barbera d'Alba as of "really serious quality". Australian winemaker Ben Cane worked for Poderi Colla for some time.
