= David Duncan (vintner) =

American vintner and entrepreneur (born 1965)

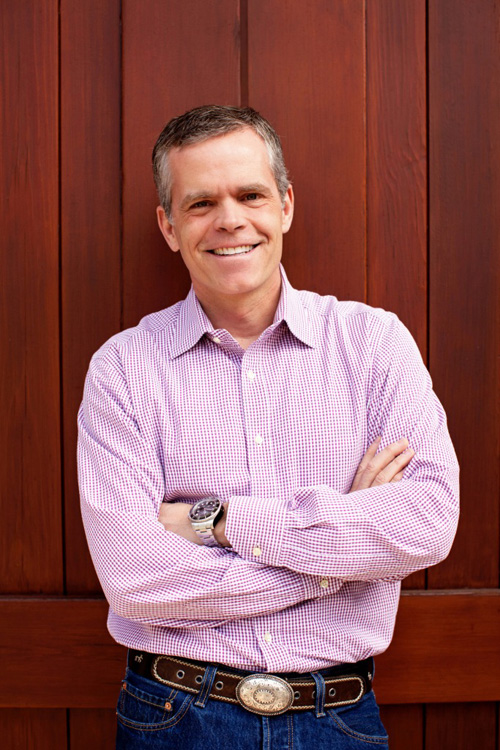
- Born: David Duncan; 1965 (age 60–61)
- Occupations: Vintner; Entrepreneur

David Duncan (born 1965) is an American vintner and entrepreneur. The president and chief executive officer of Duncan Oil, he is also the president and chief executive officer of Silver Oak Cellars and managing partner of Twomey Cellars, successful wineries in northern California, operating in the Napa, Alexander and Russian River Valleys. He is the son of late Raymond Twomey Duncan, an oil and wine entrepreneur who co-founded Silver Oak in 1972 with Justin Meyer. Silver Oak is a family-run and owned business, and his brother Tim Duncan is executive vice president of the company. ColoradoBiz says that David Duncan is "as much a hands-on winery president as he can be", as president of a winery that has "reached cult status" for its Cabernet Sauvignon production.

== Early life ==
David Duncan was born in Durango, Colorado, where his father had founded an oil company. He is one of four brothers, the others being Mike, Kevin and Tim. During the summers as a teen, he worked on a farm and cattle ranch. He obtained early information in wine cultivation through his father and would often visit the Napa Valley as the Silver Oak business expanded in the 1970s and 1980s, becoming one of California's most successful Cabernet Sauvignon brands. He studied at the University of Notre Dame, where he received a degree in English in 1988, and obtained an MBA at the University of Denver in 1994 through attending night school. He began working for his father's Duncan Oil firm, and was promoted from Exploration Manager to President in the 1990s. He became a Board Member of Colorado's First Western Trust Bank, and was also Lead Director for Noodles & Company, a chain of restaurants based in Boulder, Colorado.

== Silver Oak Cellars and Twomey Cellars ==
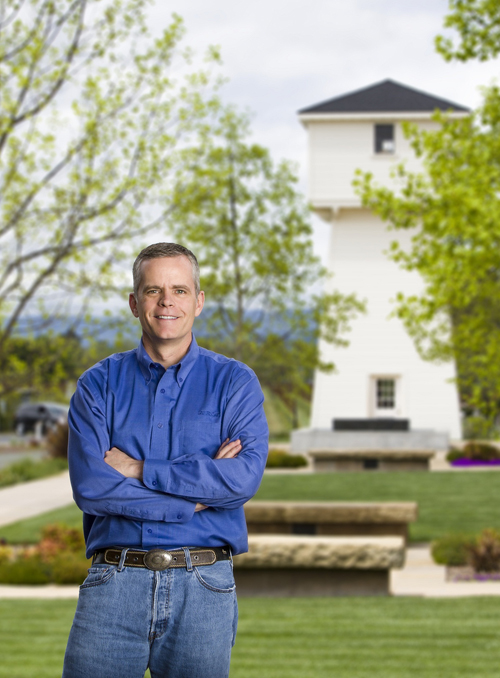
Duncan at the Oakville centre

In 1999, Duncan was instrumental in helping his family establish Twomey Cellars, to further the family's interest in wine beyond Silver Oak's exclusive Cabernet Sauvignon. Twomey Cellars is dedicated to producing Pinot noir, Merlot, and Sauvignon Blanc. Duncan helped establish the wineries for Twomey in Calistoga in 2003 and Healdsburg in 2007. In 2002, Duncan's father, Ray Duncan, asked him if he would move to the Napa Valley and run the family's wine business. At the time, Duncan's wife, Kary, was the assistant Chief of Medicine at the University of Denver. It took them less than 24 hours to agree to the move. Upon their move, Kary left her position to take up a dermatology practice in St. Helena. Duncan is the president and CEO of Silver Oak Cellars and a Managing Partner of Twomey.

From 2006 to 2008, Duncan played a key role in the creation of Silver Oak’s new Oakville Winery, after the previous winery was destroyed by a fire in February 2006. Duncan paid close attention to sustainability in the design of the new winery, with the desire to create something monumental and an ideal space for making Napa Valley Cabernet Sauvignon and entertaining guests. Duncan said, "The new winery is a winemaker's dream. We incorporated all the technological advancements of recent years into the winery's design but made sure we could accommodate changes down the line." The rebuild included using some 550 tons of reclaimed stone from a 115-year-old dismantled mill in Coffeyville, Kansas, installing 1,464 solar panels to generate solar power for the facility, elevating the property 4.5 feet above the flood plain and moving their iconic water tower 12 feet. In the tasting room, adjacent to the new tasting bar that was built with reclaimed white oak from a barn in Missouri, is a glass-house library displaying Silver Oak wines dating back to the 1970s. The new winery opened in September 2008.

In 2007, Duncan purchased the Roshambo Winery in the Russian River Valley near Healdsburg, California with more than 17 acres of vineyards to produce estate wines for Twomey. He also established a second tasting room for Twomey at the Healdsburg facility. In August 2012, Duncan purchased the Sausal Vineyard which he said, "Presents us with an excellent opportunity to grow Cabernet Sauvignon with a variety of soils and conditions not previously available to us in the production of our Alexander Valley Cabernet." He describes his job as "to get it into the bottle, and then Tim has to get it out the door." In 2009, Duncan was elected to sit on the board of the Napa Valley Vintners. In January 2014 Duncan was interviewed by the Young Presidents' Organization (YPO), during which he spoke about the negative impact that Alexander Payne's Sideways had had on merlot production in the US, the "Sideways effect", which saw merlot production decline from 14% of the market to just 2%. In 2016, Silver Oak purchased Missouri-based barrel producer A&K Cooperage, becoming the first winery in the United States to own an American cooperage. Silver Oak now has full control of its barrel production, and have officially called it "The Oak Cooperage".

In 2017, the Duncan family purchased Napa Valley's Ovid winery, with 15 acres of vineyards set in Pritchard Hill. They also signed an agreement with the San Francisco Giants, becoming their first official wine partner. In December, Duncan was interviewed on CNBC in relation to the Napa Valley's recovery from the wildfires which have affected the region, stating that all of Silver Oak's fruit had been picked before the fires broke out.

Duncan continues to closely pursue sustainability and energy efficiency. In 2016, Silver Oak's Oakville winery became the world's first production winery to be granted LEED (Leadership in Energy and Environmental Design) Platinum Certification under the Existing Buildings, Operation and Maintenance (EB:OM) rating system – the highest level of certification granted by the U.S. Green Building Council (USGBC) for efficient energy use. The winery employs a CO_{2} heat pump for sanitizing water and over 2500 solar panels for energy, storing it in batteries. In 2018, the Alexander Valley winery achieved LEED Platinum certification for its new Alexander Valley facility, the first in the world to attain it in the category of "new construction." Duncan was quoted as saying "It's never been done before. In the future, no one should build a winery that's lower than the standards we're creating. One of my goals has been to make it cost-efficient; if we build green at any cost, we're not proving anything because that's not practical for most people."

== Other interests ==
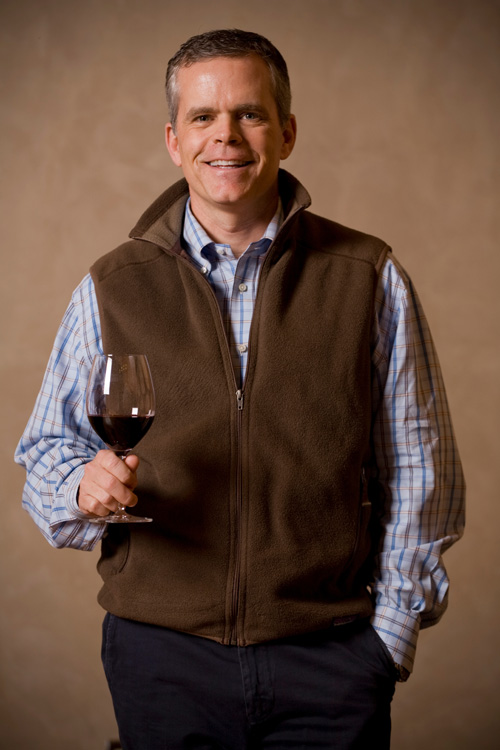
David Duncan

A resident of St. Helena, California, Duncan has served as chapter chairman and member of the Northern California Chapter of the Young Presidents Organization and chairman of the board of the St. Helena Hospital Foundation. He is involved in the St Helena Montessori School and in organizations related to wine production in the Napa Valley. He is also a founding member of a Napa Valley band called the Silverado Pickups and plays the guitar and harmonica alongside other fellow Napa Valley vintners, including Jeff Gargiulo, Shane Soldinger, Dan Zepponi, winemaker Tres Goettings, wine-industry advisor Paul Hoffman, and professional percussionist Joe Shotwell. With songs such as "Wine Country Cowboy", the band have played at the Napa Valley's BottleRock music festival alongside bands such as The Black Keys and the Kings of Leon. He also contributed to Jim Collins's book Great by Choice: Uncertainty, Chaos, and Luck--Why Some Thrive Despite Them All.

Duncan formerly ran a Tumblr blog named "Bottle Stories", in which Silver Oak enthusiasts could post their anecdotes about the brand.
