= Zelma Long =

American enologist and vintner

Zelma R. Long (born c. 1945) is an American enologist and vintner. She is considered to be one of the female pioneers in California wine, and was the first woman to assume senior management of a Californian winery, Simi Winery, of which she was president from 1989 to 1996. Long founded and was the first president of the American Vineyard Foundation to help finance research in enology and viticulture and also founded the American Viticulture and Enology Research Network (AVERN). She is the co-owner of Long Vineyards in St. Helena, California, and the Vilafonte Wine Estate in South Africa. Long has particularly been active in research into viticulture in Washington state.

== Career ==
Long graduated from the Oregon State University in 1965 and had an internship at the University of California San Francisco Medical Center, followed by a brief career as a dietician. In 1966, her family purchased a hillside vineyard in the Napa Valley and her love of viticulture was born. She then pursued a master's degree in Enology and Viticulture at the University of California, Davis in 1968 but left there in 1970 before completing her degree to work a harvest at Robert Mondavi Winery in the Napa Valley, ultimately being promoted to chief enologist during the boom of the 1970s, between 1973 and 1979. Robert Mondavi considered her departure from the company in 1979 as one of his biggest losses. She became Vice President of Simi Winery in the Alexander Valley in 1979, and after enrolling at Stanford University, became president and CEO from 1989 to 1996. She is credited with breathing new life into Simi and modernizing it, introducing new winemaking techniques and establishing new vineyards. She then served as Executive Vice President at Chandon Estates until 1999 when she committed herself to running Long Vineyards, which she established with her then-husband Bob Long in St. Helena, California in 1977.

Long founded and was the first president of the American Vineyard Foundation (AVF) to help finance research in enology and viticulture, and also founded the American Viticulture and Enology Research Network (AVERN). Long has been dedicated to enology research into other states, particularly Washington which she considers to have the best Merlot grapes in the world. She established Zelphi Wines with current husband Philip Freese, and has since ventured into new wine projects in Germany and South Africa, establishing the Vilafonte Wine Estate in Paarl, South Africa. She has said of winemaking, "Age is a precondition to greatness. Even if only 10 percent of all fine wines are fully mature before they are drunk up, it's those great aged wines that set the standard."

As one of the female pioneers of the development of viticulture in the United States, she is highly acclaimed, and has been a mentor to numerous aspiring female vintners in California. In a male-dominated industry, her coworkers have named her "Miss Oblivious", because of her "ability to turn a deaf ear to sexism". The Amis du vin Association cited her as a "superior" winemaker. She was a recipient of the James Beard Award for Wine Professional of the Year in 1997, California Wine pioneer by Wine Spectator in 1993, the MASI award for her contribution to international wine in 1994, and that year she was also nominated for Woman of the Year. In January 2009, the University of California, Davis honored her with The Outstanding Alumni award. She is the author of books such as Enological and Technological Developments. She has a keen interest in Buddhist, Asian and African art and culture, and enjoys birdwatching and horseriding in her spare time.
