= Oenology =

Study of wine and winemaking

Oenology (also enology; /iːˈnɒlədʒi/ ee-NOL-o-jee) is the science and study of wine and winemaking. Oenology is distinct from viticulture, which is the science of the growing, cultivation, and harvesting of grapes. The English word oenology derives from the Greek word oinos (οἶνος) "wine" and the suffix –logia (-λογία) the "study of". An oenologist is an expert in the science of wine and of the arts and techniques for making wine.

== Education and training ==
University programs in oenology and viticulture usually feature a concentration in science for the degree of Bachelor of Science (B.S, B.Sc., Sc.B), and as a terminal master's degree — either in a scientific or in a research program for the degree of Master of Science (M.S., Sc.M.), e.g. the master of professional studies degree. Oenologists and viticulturalists with doctorates often have a background in horticulture, plant physiology, and microbiology. Related to oenology are the professional titles of sommelier and master of wine, which are specific certifications in the restaurant business and in hospitality management. Occupationally, oenologists usually work as winemakers, as wine chemists in commercial laboratories, and in oenologic organisations, such as the Australian Wine Research Institute.

=== Australia ===
Schools in Australia tend to offer a "bachelor of viticulture" or "master of viticulture" degree.

- Charles Sturt University - Wagga Wagga, New South Wales
- Melbourne Polytechnic/La Trobe University - Melbourne Australia
- Queensland College of Wine Tourism - Stanthorpe, Queensland
- University of Adelaide - Adelaide, South Australia

=== Brazil ===
- Federal Institute of Rio Grande do Sul - Bento Gonçalves, Porto Alegre, Feliz, Sertão, Canoas, Porto Alegre-Restinga, Caxias do Sul, Osório, Erechim, and Rio Grande
- Federal University of Pampa - Dom Pedrito Campus, Rio Grande do Sul

=== Canada ===
- Brock University - St. Catharines, Ontario

=== France ===
Official National Diploma of Oenology:

- Institut Agro Montpellier pole vigne-vin - Montpellier
- Institut National Polytechnique de Toulouse - Toulouse
- Jules Guyot Institute - Dijon
- University of Bordeaux - Bordeaux
- University of Montpellier I - Montpellier
- University of Reims - Reims

Other wine diplomas:

- Université de Bourgogne - Dijon
- Université du Vin - Suze-la-Rousse

=== Germany ===
- Hochschule Geisenheim University - Geisenheim, Hesse
- University of Hohenheim - Stuttgart, Baden-Württemberg
- Heilbronn University of Applied Sciences - Heilbronn, Künzelsau, Schwäbisch Hall, Baden-Württemberg
- Staatliche Lehr- und Versuchsanstalt für Wein- und Obstbau Weinsberg - Weinsberg, Baden-Württemberg
- Bayerische Landesanstalt für Weinbau und Gartenbau - Veitshöchheim, Bavaria
- Weincampus Neustadt - Neustadt an der Weinstraße, Rheinland-Pfalz

=== Israel ===
- The Hebrew University of Jerusalem - Rehovot

=== Italy ===
- Università Cattolica del Sacro Cuore - International Vintage Master - Piacenza
- University of Bologna - Cesena
- University of Padua - Conegliano
- University of Palermo - Marsala
- University of Perugia - Perugia
- University of Salento - Lecce
- University of Teramo - Teramo
- University of Trento - Edmund Mach Foundation - Trento, San Michele all'Adige
- University of Turin - Grugliasco, Alba, and Asti (as a Consortium of the Universities of Turin, Milan, Palermo, Sassari, and Foggia)
- University of Udine - Udine
- University of Verona - Verona

=== New Zealand ===
- Eastern Institute of Technology - Hawke's Bay
- Lincoln University - Christchurch
- University of Auckland - Auckland

=== Peru ===
- Universidad Privada San Juan Bautista - Ingeniería en Enología y Viticultura - Lima, Ica, Chincha

=== Portugal ===
- Universidade do Porto - Porto
- University of Trás-os-Montes and Alto Douro - Vila Real
- Universidade de Évora - Évora

=== South Africa ===
- University of Stellenbosch - Stellenbosch

=== Slovenia ===
- University of Nova Gorica - School for viticulture and enology - Vipava

=== Switzerland ===
- Changins - Nyon

=== Spain ===
- Universitat Rovira i Virgili - Tarragona
- Universidad de La Rioja - La Rioja
- Universidad de Cádiz - Cádiz, Andalusia

=== Ukraine ===
- National University of Life and Environmental Sciences of Ukraine - Kyiv
- National University of Food Technologies - Kyiv
- Odesa National Academy of Food Technologies - Odesa

=== United Kingdom ===
- Plumpton College - East Sussex

=== United States ===
- Allan Hancock College - Santa Maria, California
- California Polytechnic State University, San Luis Obispo - San Luis Obispo, California
- Colorado Mesa University - Grand Junction, Colorado
- Colorado State University - Fort Collins, Colorado
- Cornell University - Ithaca and Geneva, New York
- Finger Lakes Community College - Canandaigua and Geneva, New York
- California State University, Fresno - Fresno, California
- Grayson College - Grayson, Texas
- Kent State University - Kent, Ohio
- Miami University - Oxford, Ohio
- Napa Valley College - Napa, California
- Oregon State University - Corvallis, Oregon
- Patrick & Henry Community College - Henry County, Virginia
- Paul Smith's College - Paul Smiths, New York
- Sonoma State University - Sonoma, California
- Surry Community College - Dobson, North Carolina
- University of California, Davis - Davis, California
- University of Missouri - Columbia, Missouri
- Virginia Polytechnic Institute and State University (Virginia Tech) - Blacksburg, Virginia
- Washington State University - Pullman, Washington
- Yavapai College - Clarkdale, Arizona

== Prominent oenologists ==
- Alberto Antonini
- Miguel Brascó
- Cathy Corison
- Tullio De Rosa
- Peter Gago
- Emma Gao
- Hermann Jaeger
- Max Léglise
- Zelma Long
- Justin Meyer
- Thomas Volney Munson
- Hermann Müller (Thurgau)
- Ottavio Ottavi
- Jacques Puisais
- Michel Rolland
- Carol Shelton
- Păstorel Teodoreanu
- Miguel A. Torres
- Keith Wallace
