= Twomey Cellars =

Winery in Calistoga, California, U.S.

Coordinates: 38°33′58″N 122°33′24″W

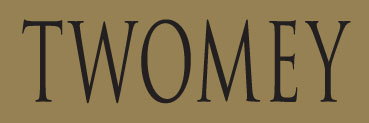
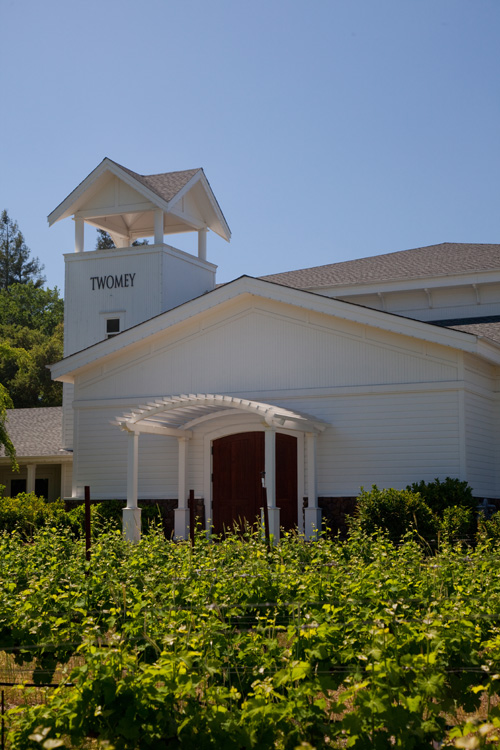
- Location: Calistoga, California; Healdsburg, California; Philo, California; Dundee, Oregon, USA
- Appellation: Napa Valley AVA; Russian River Valley AVA Dundee Hills AVA Anderson Valley AVA
- Founded: 1999
- Key people: Ray Duncan; David Duncan, Proprietor/Chairman & CEO, Tim Duncan, Proprietor/Chief Revenue Officer; Nate Weis, Vice President of Winegrowing; Justin Hirigoyen, Director of Winemaking; Dominic Orsini, winery chef
- Varietals: Pinot noir, Sauvignon blanc
- Website: https://www.twomey.com/

Twomey Cellars (pronounced too-me) is a California winery. It was established in 1999 by the Duncan Family, who have operated the successful Silver Oak Cellars in California since 1972. The Duncan Family started Twomey Cellars to pursue varietals other than Cabernet Sauvignon. Twomey has three wineries: one in Calistoga in the Napa Valley; one in Healdsburg in the Russian River Valley; one in Philo in Anderson Valley, and produces mainly Pinot noir and Sauvignon blanc. Twomey’s Sauvignon blanc is a blend of Sauvignon blanc grapes from their estate vineyards at their wineries in Napa Valley, Anderson Valley, and Russian River Valley.

Twomey is named after Ray Duncan's mother, Velma Marie Twomey Duncan. Nate Weis is Director of Winemaking for both Twomey and Silver Oak. In 2007, Twomey hired Ben Cane, a Pinot noir specialist who became Twomey’s Pinot noir and Sauvignon blanc Winemaker in 2008. Twomey's 2009 Russian River Valley Pinot noir was awarded first place in the American Wine Society's National Tasting Project in 2012. As of 2017 Twomey produces about 20,000 cases a year.

== History ==
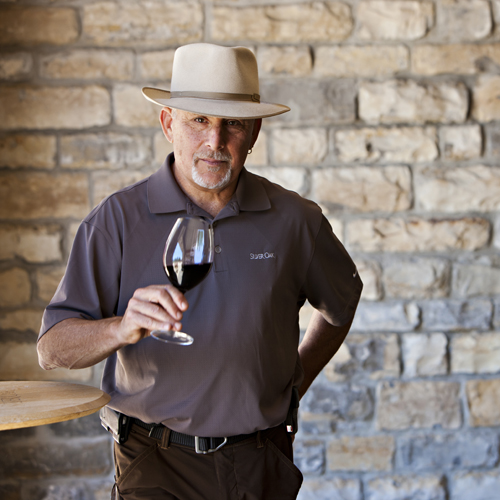
Daniel Baron

Twomey began with the Soda Canyon Ranch Vineyard located in southeastern Napa Valley. Ray Duncan and the Duncan family purchased Soda Canyon Ranch Vineyard in 1999 for Silver Oak’s Napa Valley Cabernet Sauvignon, but Daniel Baron, former Director of Winemaking for Silver Oak, discovered it was planted with high class French Merlot clones, and persuaded the Duncans to venture into producing it and establish a new company.

Twomey’s Merlot was a single vineyard wine made with grapes grown at Soda Canyon Ranch Vineyard. In 2000 Twomey acquired the West Pin Vineyard in the Russian River Valley to begin making Russian River Valley Pinot noir in addition to the single vineyard Napa Valley Merlot. As production of Twomey wines continued to increase, the Duncan family believed that Twomey needed a winery of its own. In 2003, the Duncans purchased Stonegate Winery in Calistoga to become the home of Twomey. Twomey’s Calistoga winery, which is surrounded by a Sauvignon blanc vineyard, is situated in a palatial farmhouse-like building, featuring an open tasting room with sleek slate floors and a black, polished bar.

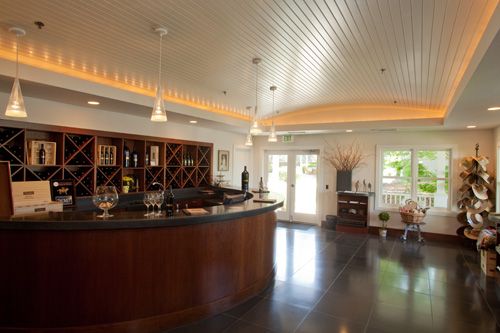
Winery interior, Calistoga

In 2006, the Duncan family purchased Roshambo Winery in Healdsburg to establish a second winery for Twomey. This winery, dedicated to the production of Pinot noir and Sauvignon blanc, has glass walls and curving roofs shaped like the contours of the nearby hills. The winery was overhauled for a period of about 2 years to convert it into a Pinot noir production facility, introducing small (2- and 5-ton) open top fermentors, with temperature closely controlled by separate heating and chilling plates.

In 2007, Ben Cane was hired to oversee the production of Pinot noir and Sauvignon blanc. In May 2012, noted winemaker Jean-Claude Berrouet joined Twomey as winemaking consultant, working closely with Director of Winemaking Daniel Baron in the production of Twomey's Napa Valley Merlot. Jean-Claude Berrouet served as the winemaker and technical director at Établissements Jean-Pierre Moueix for 44 vintages. During his tenure at Etablissement Jean-Pierre Moueix, he was responsible for the production of their line-up of wines from Pomerol and St. Emilion, including the Chateau Petrus. In July 2014, Cane departed Twomey for Westwood Wines, and was replaced by Erin Miller, a winemaker with considerable previous experience working for Provingage Wine Associates, Evening Land Vineyards, the Hartford Family Winery and Kendall-Jackson’s Vinwood Cellars. Nate Weis joined the same year and then replaced Daniel Baron in 2017 when Baron retired. Miller has since been succeeded by Justin Hirigoyen. In 2017, Twomey and Silver Oak signed an agreement with the San Francisco Giants, becoming their first official wine partner. As of 2017 Twomey produces about 20,000 cases a year.

== Vineyards ==
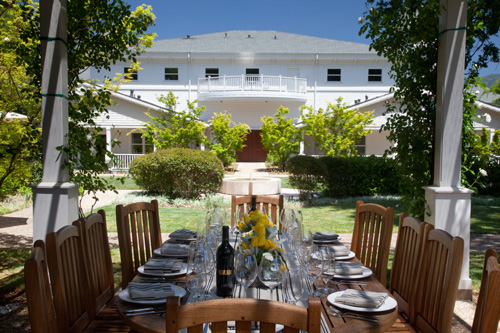
Twomey Cellars, Calistoga

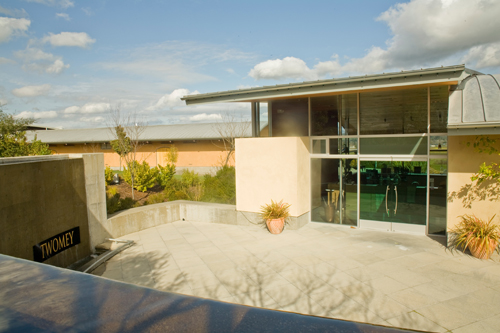
Twomey Cellars, Healdsburg

Twomey’s Calistoga Estate Vineyard, surrounding the Calistoga Winery, and Healdsburg Estate Vineyard, on the Healdsburg winery property, are planted with Sauvignon Blanc. Their sources of fruit for their Merlot, Pinot noir and Sauvignon blanc wines come from estate-owned vineyards in the Napa, Russian River and Anderson Valleys, and from independent partner growers who have a contract with Twomey to grow grapes for them. The Duncan family’s purchase of the Soda Canyon Ranch vineyard in 1999 in southeastern Napa Valley was the impetus for Twomey’s creation. They originally purchased Soda Canyon Ranch Vineyard to produce Cabernet Sauvignon for Silver Oak. Soda Canyon Ranch Vineyard is located in the rolling hills of southeastern Napa Valley and its volcanic soils are tightly planted with French Merlot clones.

In 2000, Twomey acquired West Pin Vineyard in the Russian River Valley to begin making Russian River Valley Pinot noir. In 2010, the Duncan family purchased the 17-acre Monument Tree Vineyard, one of the most sought-after vineyards for Pinot noir production in the Anderson Valley. The vineyard, located at the top of the Anderson Valley, is named after an imposing redwood tree which towers above the hillside vineyard which was struck by lightning. In 2017, the Duncan family purchased Prince Hill Vineyard, a 40 acre vineyard in the Dundee Hills of the Willamette Valley, from Dick Erath. The vineyard produces Pinot Noir for Twomey exclusively.

Twomey produces three appellation Pinot noirs, a single vineyard Pinot noir and a Sauvignon blanc estate. The grapes for the appellation Pinot noirs are from the Russian River Valley, Anderson Valley and Sonoma Coast appellations. The fruit for the single vineyard Pinot noir comes from the famed Bien Nacido Vineyard in the Santa Maria Valley.

== Methods ==
=== Soutirage Traditionnel ===
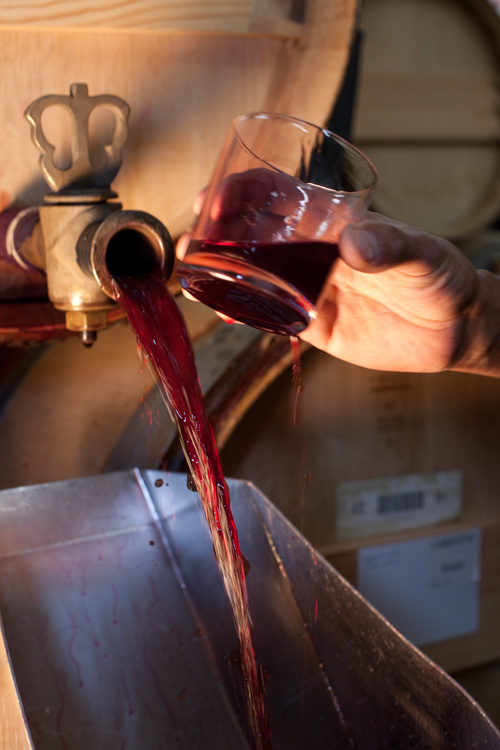
Soutirage of Twomey's Merlot

Twomey was one of two Northern California wineries to use the labor-intensive technique of soutirage traditionnel to produce its Merlot. Twomey’s Merlot was typically aged for 18 months in French oak barrels, and during the aging process the wine is racked from barrel to barrel, something known as soutirage traditionnel. Soutirage is the method of moving the wine from one barrel to another using gravity rather than a pump, which can be disruptive to a wine. This process softens tannins and clarifies and enhances the aromatic qualities of this wine.

=== Dry cork sensory screening ===
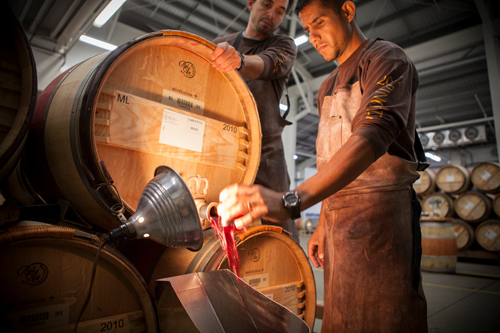
Soutirage process

In 2009, Silver Oak and Twomey’s Associate Winemaker Christiane Schleussner, working with Carlos Macku, Lesa Gonzalez, Ana Cristina Mesquita and Leonard C. Kirch at Cork Supply USA and Cork Supply Portugal, pioneered the commercial sensory evaluation method known as "dry cork sensory screening" for detecting the chemical compound TCA (2,4,6-trichloroanisol), which is responsible for cork taint. The breakthrough process was described in the Journal of Agricultural and Food Chemistry, Vol. 57, Issue 17 in 2009 and is also used by Twomey.

=== Sustainability ===
Like Silver Oak Cellars, Twomey is committed to sustainability and state-of-the-art farming practices. The Duncan family states that their livelihood and future livelihood depend upon the "ecological viability of the land" and contribute to a better quality grape and wine.

== Reception ==
Sonoma Wine said that Twomey's wines are a "marriage of classical French technique and an extraordinary California vineyard, [which] results in Twomey’s distinctive, complex, and rich expression of luscious fruit." Wine & Spirits states that their Russian Valley wines are "A simple, sweet syrah with a gamey edge", and well-balanced. Wine Enthusiast said of their 2008 Twomey Merlot: "made with a drop of Cabernet Franc, this Merlot is rich, smooth and bone dry. With modest alcohol, it brims with flavors of black and red currant, licorice, anise and white pepper, as well as a subtle touch of sweet, smoky new oak. The grapes come from the cool Soda Canyon area of Napa Valley, at the base of Atlas Peak." In 2004, the Cheers/Beverage Dynamics National Wine Panel, consisting of respected restaurant, hotel and retail beverage professionals, voted their 2000 Merlot as one of their five-star wines, remarking that the wine was "full-bodied with great cherry and chocolate flavors."

Of Twomey’s Pinot noir wines, the Prince of Pinot, William Gaffney of PinotFile said, "Clearly, there is a serious commitment at Twomey Cellars to produce Pinot noirs to rival their lofty and iconic neighboring wineries on Westside Road." Twomey's 2009 Russian River Valley Pinot noir was awarded first place in the American Wine Society's National Tasting Project in 2012. Eric Asimov of The New York Times cited Twomey's 2009 Anderson Valley Pinot noir as "one of our favorites, bigger and softer but with both finesse and intensity."

He also stated that the 2009 Twomey was his number two selection, describing it as "fresh and pungent, yet somewhat restrained as well. It was harmonious, a quality that we didn’t find often enough." According to the Washington Examiner, Twomey's Bien Nacido Pinot noir from the Santa Maria Valley is their first vineyard-designated Pinot noir bottling and the wines are noted for their "silky finish". They say of it: "Made from organically farmed fruit, the wine is crafted in a forward style, featuring aromas of sweet strawberry and wild raspberries on the nose and repeated on the palate where they are joined by lush, ripe berries and undercurrents of red currants and violets, all built on a graceful framework with a fine balance between tannins and acidity."

Twomey's 2010 Bien Nacido Vineyard and Santa Maria Valley Pinot noir went on sale on September 29, 2012 and was produced in 1100 cases. Twomey describe it as being of a "red-ruby color and an expressive, [with a] complex nose of fresh rose petals, fresh crushed cranberries and wild strawberries with a subtle hint of rose." The San Francisco Chronicle notes the quiet ambiance of Twomey's wineries, describing them as "an elegant escape from the typical, crowded tourist destinations nearby." In 2015, Wine & Spirits named Twomey in its annual list of "Top 100 Wineries".
