= Dominus Estate =

California wine estate

Coordinates: 38°24′18″N 122°22′26″W

- Location: Yountville, California, US
- Appellation: Napa Valley AVA
- Formerly: Napanook Vineyards
- Founded: 1836
- First vintage: 1983
- Key people: Christian Moueix
- Known for: Dominus; Napanook
- Website: www.dominusestate.com

Dominus Estate is a California wine estate producing Bordeaux style blends, owned by Christian Moueix. The winery is located in Yountville within the Napa Valley AVA.

== History ==
George C. Yount, the founder of Yountville, planted in 1836 the first vines of the valley on the location of Napanook vineyard. In 1850 the property was bought by Charles Hopper, and owners since include Hugh La Rue, a pioneer in the use of rootstock and John Daniel Jr., the owner of Inglenook Winery who bought the estate in 1946.

Following Daniel's death in 1970, Napanook passed to his daughters Robin Lail and Marcia Smith who in 1982 began a partnership with Christian Moueix, acting on a recommendation by Robert Mondavi to establish production in Napa Valley. Daniel Baron became general manager of Dominus in the 1980s. Moueix, also in charge of production at Château Pétrus and president of Établissements Jean-Pierre Moueix, became the sole owner of Dominus Estate when Lail and Smith sold their shares in 1995. Napanook, the estate's second wine, was first released in 1996.

With the previous thirteen vintages crushed and aged at the nearby facility Rombauer Winery, a new winery was constructed by the Swiss architects Jaques Herzog and Pierre de Meuron in 1996, a $5 million, 50,000 sq ft (4,600 m^{2}) structure. The architects' first U.S. project, it was constructed from stone-filled gabions to provide protection from scorching heat by day and the cold at night.

== Production ==
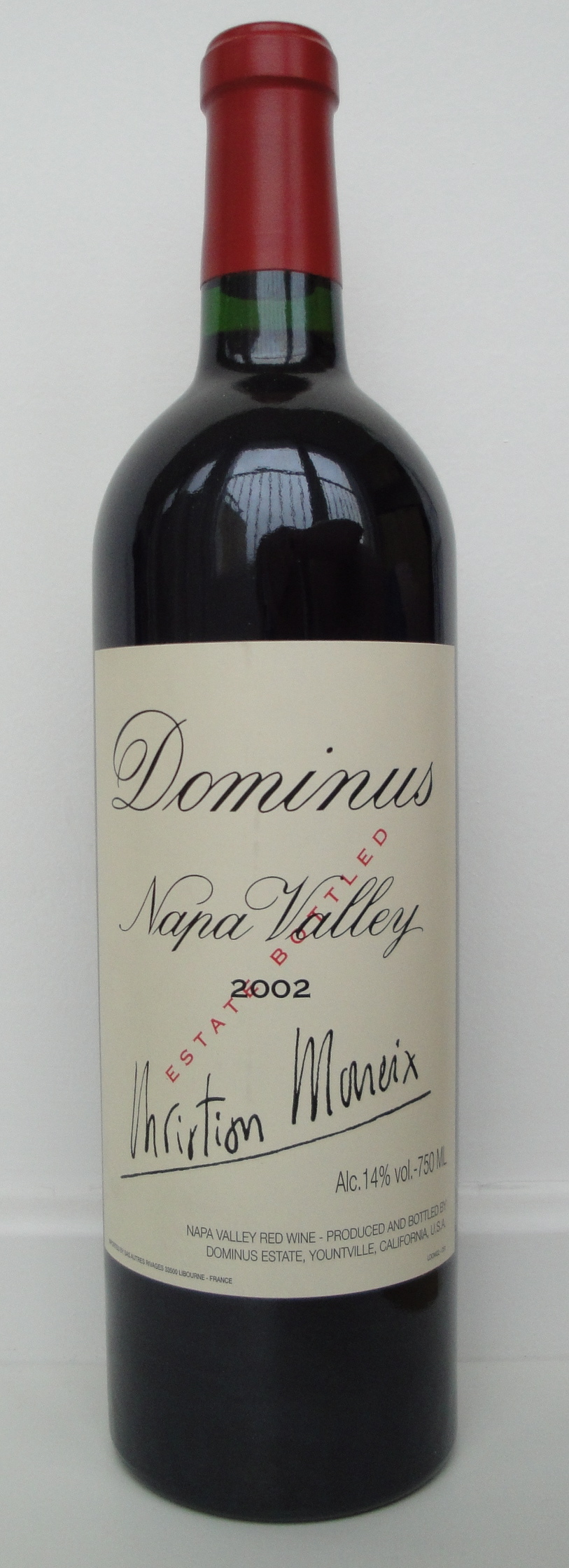
A bottle of 2002 Dominus.

From an estate of 124 acres (50 ha), the vineyard area extends 108 acres (44 ha) in 14 blocks, with some presence of phylloxera-resistant St. George rootstock from the Inglenook period, the grape varieties are 87% Cabernet Sauvignon, 8% Petit Verdot, and 5% Cabernet Franc.

The annual production is 7,500 to 12,000 cases which includes both Dominus and Napanook.
