= Jim Clendenen =

American winemaker (1953–2021)

- Born: James Alexander Clendenen; January 11, 1953; Akron, Ohio, U.S.
- Died: May 15, 2021 (aged 68); Buellton, California, U.S.
- Education: University of California, Santa Barbara
- Occupation: Winemaker
- Spouses: Sarah Chamberlin (divorced) Morgan Clendenen (divorced)
- Children: 2

James Alexander Clendenen (January 11, 1953 – May 15, 2021) was an American winemaker and the owner of Au Bon Climat, a winery in Santa Maria, California. Jim Clendenen was deemed "The Godfather" of Santa Barbara County wine. He was key in raising international recognition of Santa Barbara County as a world class wine region, as well as being instrumental in raising the quality of Burgundian varietals on California's Central Coast.

== Early life ==
Clendenen was born in Akron, Ohio, on January 11, 1953. His father, Donald, worked as a chemical engineer with Firestone Tire and Rubber Company; his mother, Alice, was a housewife. Clendenen went to school in Cuyahoga Falls, Ohio, until grade nine, when the family relocated to La Habra, CA. He completed his high school at Lowell High school before studying pre-law at the University of California, Santa Barbara, graduating with high honors in 1974. He initially intended to work as a chef, having cooked in nursing homes and restaurants. His interest in winemaking was piqued after traveling around Europe as a junior. He returned in 1977, staying in Bordeaux, Champagne, and Burgundy for six months. He consequently opted not to enter law school and went into winemaking instead.

== Career ==
Clendenen began his winemaking career working at Zaca Mesa Winery for three vintages. After traveling around the world in order to work three harvests in one year (California, Australia and France), he founded Au Bon Climat in 1982 with partner Adam Tolmach. It was based in a former dairy barn outside of Los Alamos, California. At first, he and Tolmach handled all aspects of the business – including the picking of grapes, sales, and delivery – because they "had no money to hire any labor". The winery employed the techniques for making wine that he picked up in Burgundy, and he specialized in chardonnay and pinot noir, which were two of his favorite wines. Au Bon Climat gained prominence in the middle of the 1980s, partly due to his extensive travels to publicize the wines and the Santa Barbara region. Their wines were lauded for their atypical "subtlety and restraint". Clendenen ultimately acquired full ownership of the winery in 1989 and diversified with other ventures such as Clendenen Family Vineyards.

Clendenen won several awards for his winemaking, including the 2001 winemaker of the year by Food & Wine, Winemaker of the World by Wein Gourmet three years later, and Who’s Who of Food and Beverage in America by the James Beard Foundation in 2007. He also mentored several up-and-coming winemakers. He headlined his hometown's wine auction in 2005 and 2017, which was the largest fundraiser for the Akron Art Museum.

== Personal life ==
Clendenen was married twice, with both marriages ending in divorce. His first marriage was to Sarah Chamberlin. His second was to Morgan Clendenen, and they had two children: Isabelle and Knox. His daughter, Isabelle, works in sales and marketing for Au Bon Climat and son Knox currently is working in the cellar at the winery. Clendenen split his time between his home in Buellton and at his ranch in Los Alamos during his later years.

Clendenen died in his sleep on May 15, 2021, at his home in Buellton, California at the age of 68. He is also survived by his older sister, Marsha, and younger sister, Patricia, as well as his nephew Patrick, niece Marisa, and great nephew.
