= Windsor Vineyards =

Winery located in Windsor, California

Coordinates: 38.54364°N 122.81248°W

- Location: Windsor, California, USA
- Appellation: Alexander Valley, Russian River Valley, North Coast, Mendocino, Knights Valley
- Founded: 1959
- Key people: Pat Roney, Vintner; Marco DiGiulio, Winemaker
- Varietals: Petite Sirah, Meritage, Cabernet Sauvignon, Sangiovese, Carignane, Pinot noir, Syrah, Merlot, Zinfandel, Chardonnay, Gewürztraminer, Sauvignon blanc, Muscat (grape and wine)
- Other products: business gifts, custom labeled wines
- Tasting: Tiburon, California
- Website: Windsorvineyards.com

Windsor Vineyards is a winery located in Windsor, California, United States. It is one of the largest direct-to-consumer wineries located in the United States.

== History ==
After a career as a professional dancer, Rodney Strong moved to Tiburon, California, with his wife and founded the winery Tiburon Vinters, in 1959. He then bought and relocated to a new winery in Windsor in 1962. The property was renamed Sonoma Vineyards and then finally Rodney Strong Vineyards. The move allowed for increased production and was closer to Strong's Sonoma County vineyard properties.

Richard Graff's parents were investors in Windsor Vineyards, and Graff got his first wine-making lessons from Rodney Strong.

The winery was sold to the Tom Klein winemaking family in 1989. Rodney Strong remained a consultant until 1995. The winery changed hands again in 2000 when it was purchased by Australian wine unit Mildura Blass, who added Windsor to its family of international wine holdings under the umbrella of Beringer Blass Wine Estates.

Rodney Strong died in 2006. In 2007, vintner Patrick Roney purchased Windsor Vineyards, incorporating Vintage Wine Estates. Roney brought in winemaker Marco DiGiulio, and moved the tasting room to the Healdsburg town square, a central location to the winery's primary AVA sources (Dry Creek Valley AVA, Alexander Valley AVA, and The Russian River Valley AVA).

In July 2024, Vintage Wine Estates filed for Chapter 11 bankruptcy protection, with plans to sell all of its assets, including Windsor Vineyards.
