= American Vineyard Foundation =

American charity organization

The American Vineyard Foundation (AVF) is an American non-profit public charity which aims to improve the American wine industry through research. It was founded by Zelma Long to help finance research in enology and viticulture; Long also founded the American Viticulture and Enology Research Network (AVERN). Justin Meyer was head of the foundation in the 1990s. Jim Frisinger has been chairman of the AVF since 2010. It has its headquarters in Napa, California. The foundation relies on private donors, mainly from winemakers; in 2003 they managed to get 808 competing grapegrowers and vintners to contribute $1,178,652.97 to fund cooperative research; however, in the past they have often failed to make $1 million annually. In recent years they have invested in research into wine production in the states of Washington, Oregon, Texas and Virginia.
