= The Oak Cooperage =

Missouri-based oak barrel-making company

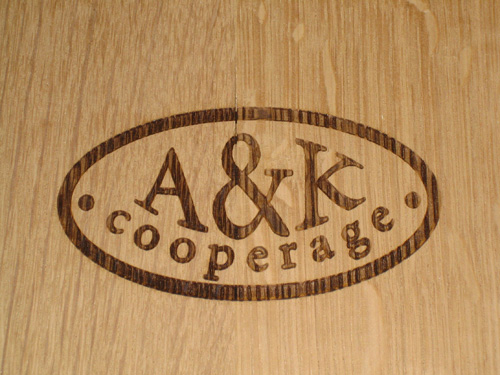
Logo

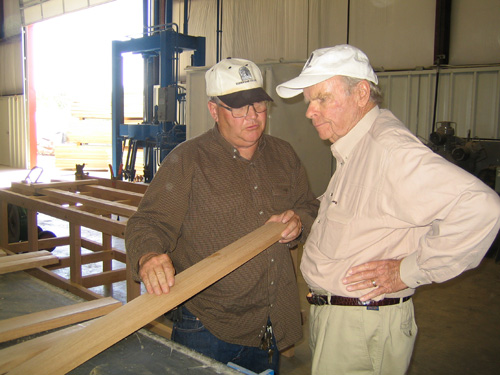

The Oak Cooperage (formerly known as A&K Cooperage) is a Missouri-based oak barrel-making company, established in 1972. It is based in Higbee, Missouri. They provide wine barrels to several notable companies, including Silver Oak Cellars, who purchased half of the company in 2000. They make white American oak barrels, air-dried between 18 and 36 months.

== History ==
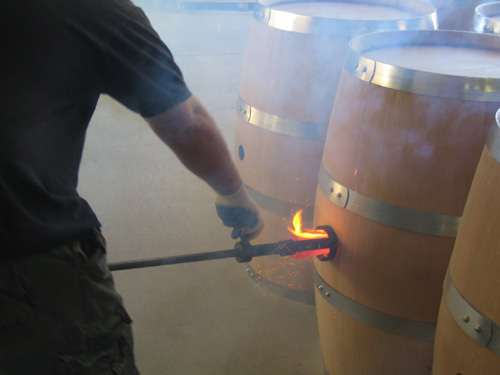
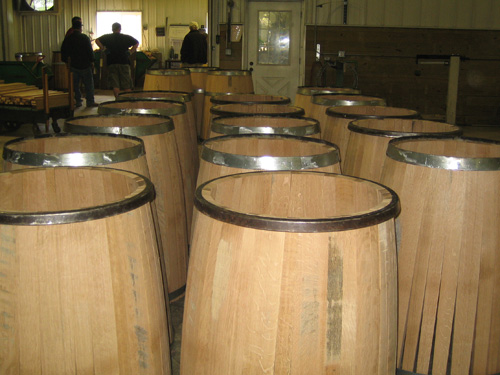

A&K Cooperage was established in Higbee, Missouri in 1972 as a keg business by D.L. Andrews and his son-in-law Dale Kirby. They initially produced 5- to 20- gallon kegs but began concentrating on manufacturing 59-gallon American white oak barrels. In 1988 they were involved in a court case and hired a New York attorney before they could collect $23,000 for a shipment of 200 barrels from a client who failed to make payment.

Andrews died in 1996, leaving Dale Kirby and son, Matthew, to run the business. As a major supplier to Silver Oak Cellars, a top winery in northern California producing Cabernet Sauvignon, in 2000, A&K Cooperage formed an agreement with Silver Oak who bought out half the company. They also purchased several hundred acres of timberland to maintain production. Today the company produces about 3000 out of some 5000 barrels annually exclusively for Silver Oak. In the 2000s, the company has aimed to expand its clientele to smaller and mid-sized wine producers, and since 2007 has used lasers to etch winery logos on the heads of the barrels they make. The barrels have been used by several successful wineries who have won national and prestigious industry awards for their wines and have attributed A&K Cooperage in aiding the quality of their wines, including Silver Oak Cellars.

== Production ==
The Oak Cooperage has been producing 60 (59) gallon barrels, but they also make 30, 48, and 70 gallon barrels of both American and French oak. They are made in the European tradition, treating the American oak wood with a process known as fire bending, toasted over an oak fire, which renders the wood more pliable. The barrels are then air-dried for approximately 18 to 24 months, but up to 36 months. The source of the oak is the forests in northern Missouri and Kentucky. The barrels typically have eight galvanized hoops and can be free of char due to the mild slow burning process of barrel making. Shipments are then sent to their clients, which in 1982 was stated to be with minimum orders of 25 barrels.
