= Au Bon Climat =

American winery located in California

Coordinates: 34.919058°N 120.297881°W

Au Bon Climat is a U.S.-based winery, founded in 1982 by Adam Tolmach and Jim Clendenen in the early years of the Santa Barbara County wine industry. In 1990, Tolmach left to start Ojai Winery and Clendenen became sole proprietor and winemaker. The winery is located in Santa Maria, California, and exclusively produces Burgundian-styled wine from grape varietals Pinot Noir, Chardonnay, Pinot Blanc and Pinot Gris. According to the winery's website, the primary source for Au Bon Climat's grapes is the Bien Nacido Vineyard, in northern Santa Barbara County, where the winery itself is located. Au Bon Climat also sources grapes from the Le Bon Climat Vineyard, the Sanford & Benedict Vineyard, the Los Alamos Vineyard, the Rancho La Cuna Vineyard, and San Luis Obispo County's Talley Vineyards. The winery makes about 10 different Pinot Noirs, and 6 different Chardonnays each vintage. Most are vineyard designated on the label.
