= Bien Nacido Vineyards =

American vineyard located in California

Coordinates: 34.90801°N 120.295669°W

Bien Nacido Vineyards of Rancho Tepusquet
- Location: Santa Maria, California, United States
- Appellation: Santa Maria Valley
- Founded: 1969
- First vintage: 1973
- Key people: Nick deLuca, Christopher Hammell, Anthony Avila, Will Costello MS, Wes Hagen, Nicholas Miller, Marshall Miller, Stephen Miller
- Parent company: Thornhill Companies
- Known for: Bien Nacido and Solomon Hills Estate Wines
- Varietals: Pinot Noir, Syrah, Chardonnay, Pinot Blanc, Viognier, Merlot, Pinot Gris, Barbera, Roussanne, Nebbiolo
- Other products: Avocados, Meyer Lemons
- Tasting: Tasting Room Located in Santa Maria, CA
- Website: http://www.biennacidovineyards.com

Bien Nacido Vineyards is vineyard located in the Santa Maria Valley of California's Central Coast. It is known for growing Burgundian and Rhone varieties of wine grapes. Bien Nacido has the distinction of being one of the major viticultural nurseries in the state for certified, varietal budwood. Most of the vines were originally from stock grown by the University of California, Davis. While the average increase block in California is less than 10 acres (40,000 m^{2}), Bien Nacido Vineyards has several hundred acres of certified Chardonnay, Pinot Noir, Merlot and a number of other varieties. Much of the Chardonnay planted in California in the last twenty years began as Bien Nacido Vineyards cuttings.

Bien Nacido Vineyards produces an estate wine program run by Trey Fletcher. The focus of the estate program is to showcase specific, small blocks of the larger vineyard, in a very holistic approach. The winery produces around 1400 cases annually of Pinot Noir, Syrah and Chardonnay. Additionally, a small portion of wine is made exclusively from the famous X Block, Old Vines and from a monopole block called The Captain.

Additionally there are two independent winemakers who make their wine on the vineyard, Bob Lindquist of Qupe Winery and Jim Clendenen of Au Bon Climat.

== History ==
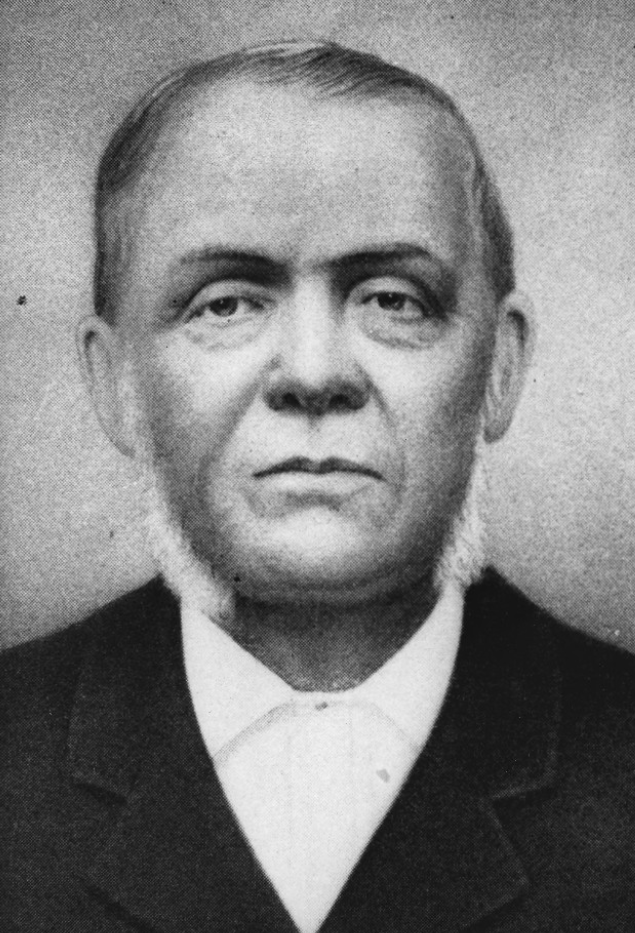
Juan Pacífico Ontiveros purchased Rancho Tepusquet in 1855 and built the Ontiveros Adobe in 1857.

The vineyard traces its roots back to 1837, when Tomas Olivera received the two square league Rancho Tepusquet Mexican land grant from then Governor of Alta California, Juan Bautista Alvarado. The grant covered nearly 9,000 acres (36 km^{2}) ranging upward to the San Rafael Mountains from the Santa Maria Mesa, which bordered the Sisquoc and Cuyama Rivers. The ranch was generously watered by Tepusquet Creek, so called by the Chumash Indians to whom it meant "fishing for trout." Thomas Olivera sold Rancho Tepusquet in 1855 to his step daughter, María Martina Osuna and son-in-law Juan Pacifico Ontiveros. Juan Pacifico Ontiveros started construction on an adobe in 1857 and moved to the ranch the following year. He and his wife raised horses, cattle, sheep, several grain crops, and grapes for the production of wine. During subsequent years, his heirs divided the property until only about 1,400 acres (5.7 km^{2}) remained surrounding the Ontiveros Adobe.

In 1969, the Millers, a branch of the Broome family which has farmed Rancho Guadalasca since 1871, purchased the property. They also purchased an adjacent parcel which had been part of the original land grant, and reunited the two as Rancho Tepusquet, now comprising over 2,000 acres (8.1 km^{2}). While the ranch itself had always been called "Rancho Tepusquet", the Millers selected the name "Bien Nacido Vineyards of Rancho Tepusquet" for the vineyard operation.

In 2010, the California State Fair named Bien Nacido Vineyards the Vineyard of the Year.

== Soil and climate ==
Located on the receiving end of the east-west transverse mountain range, Bien Nacido Vineyards is a maritime-influenced desert. The morning fog cover and the cool afternoon breezes from the Pacific Ocean make this a Region 1 climate on the Winkler Scale. The rainfall averages 12 – 14 inches a year. The terrain is sand, chalk and marine loam that provides good drainage. The whole package results in cool, slow ripening grapes, with longer hangtime on the vines.

== Vineyards ==
Bien Nacido Vineyards consists of over 800 acres (3.2 km^{2}) of planted vines, of which over 300 acres (1.2 km^{2}) are planted to Chardonnay, over 250 acres (1.0 km^{2}) to Pinot Noir, a variety associated with the appellation, and a number of acres each to Pinot Blanc, Syrah, and Merlot. Since 1992, experimental plantings of Pinot Gris, Barbera, Grenache, Mourvèdre, Roussanne, Nebbiolo and Viognier, as well as new clones of Chardonnay, Pinot Noir, Syrah, and Merlot, have been added.

Bien Nacido has the distinction of being one of the major viticultural nurseries in the state for certified, varietal budwood. Most of the vines were originally from stock grown by the University of California, Davis. While the average increase block in California is less than 10 acres (40,000 m^{2}), Bien Nacido Vineyards has several hundred acres of certified Chardonnay, Pinot Noir, Merlot and a number of other varieties. Much of the Chardonnay planted in California in the last twenty years began as Bien Nacido Vineyards cuttings. The Syrah cuttings also have gained a reputation to the point that some vineyards will refer to their plants as stemming from the Bien Nacido clone.

== Viticulture practices ==
Each customer's portion of a block is farmed according to their standards, such as organic or biodynamic farming techniques. The grape production is sold to customers by charging a flat rate for the area or rows, so the winemakers can crop their vines to volume they desire. This is in contrast to the industry standard which is to sell by the ton. The typical industry approach creates an adversarial relationship in which the vineyard is advantaged to hang more fruit on the vine, whereas the artisan winemakers want to crop it down and let the fruit hang longer (which further dehydrates and shrinks the tonnage). Some of Bien Nacido customers have bought the same rows of grapes for over 20 years and will even designate their particular block on the bottle.

== Notable Persons ==
Bien Nacido and their sister estate Solomon Hills employs acclaimed winemaker Trey Fletcher as winemaker. Trey has harvested and made wine in California, New Zealand, and Argentina all prior to landing at Bien Nacido and Solomon Hills Estates.

Bien Nacido and Solomon Hills is the only family owned wineries in the Central Coast of California to employ as Master Sommelier as well. Will Costello, MS is the Estates Ambassador representing the wines nationally for the estate. There is a focus on education, sommelier outreach as well as curating homes for the small production of the estate wines. Costello passed the Master Sommelier exam in 2015
