= Raymond Duncan (entrepreneur) =

American entrepreneur and vintner (1930–2015)

Ray Duncan
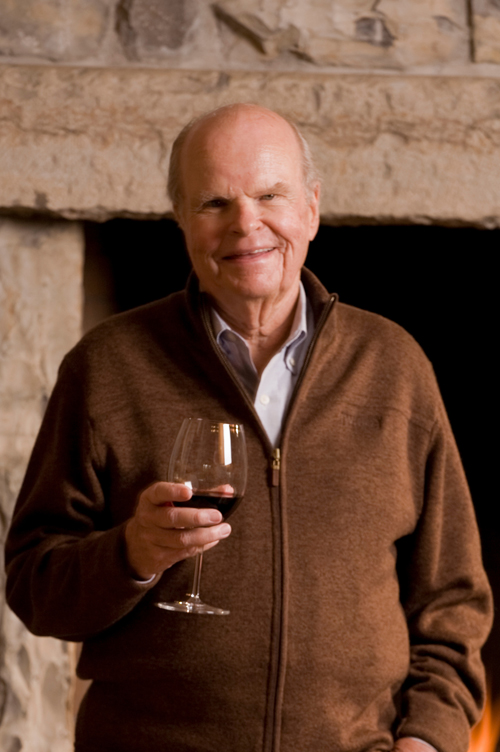
- Born: Raymond Twomey Duncan; October 23, 1930; Lasalle, Illinois, U.S.
- Died: October 9, 2015 (aged 84); Denver, Colorado, U.S.
- Occupations: Entrepreneur; Vintner

Raymond Twomey Duncan (October 23, 1930 – October 9, 2015) known as Ray Duncan was an American entrepreneur and vintner. Originally involved in oil entrepreneurship in Colorado and founder of Duncan Oil, he was the founder along with Justin Meyer of Silver Oak Cellars in 1972, a successful winery based in the Napa Valley and Alexander Valley. Today his sons David Duncan and Tim Duncan run Silver Oak Cellars, as well as Twomey Cellars. Duncan established the Durango Mountain "Purgatory" Ski Resort in 1965 and was chairman of the board for the ski industry organization Colorado Ski Country USA. He was inducted into the Colorado Ski and Snowboard Hall of Fame in 2006.

Raymond T. Duncan was inducted into the Colorado Business Hall of Fame by Junior Achievement-Rocky Mountain and the Denver Metro Chamber of Commerce in 2012.

== Biography ==
Duncan was born in Illinois in 1930. He attended the University of Notre Dame, graduating in 1952.

In 1958, Duncan moved to Durango, Colorado to aid his father in exploring oil and gas reserves. He formed Duncan Oil Inc., which moved its headquarters to Denver in 1968. In 1965, Duncan established the Durango Mountain "Purgatory" Ski Resort and was involved in the ski industry organization Colorado Ski Country USA, later becoming chairman of the board. As a result, he was inducted into the Colorado Ski and Snowboard Hall of Fame in 2006.

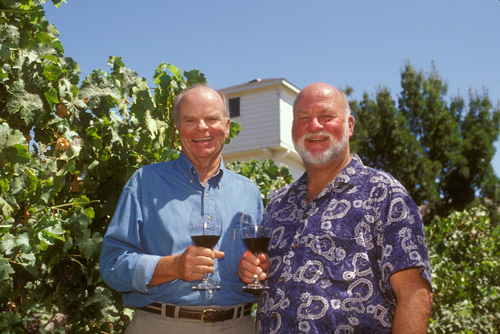
Duncan with Silver Oak Cellars co-founder, Justin Meyer

In the 1970s, Duncan began to buy land in both the Napa and Alexander Valleys with the goal of planting vineyards and growing and selling grapes; he had no original intentions of entering the winery business. Duncan approached Justin Meyer, whom he'd met through mutual friends, and asked him to plant and manage his vineyards. Meyer agreed to manage his vineyards, but he also wanted to create a winery. Duncan agreed and Silver Oak was established in 1972. Named after its location between Oakville and the Silverado Trail in Napa Valley, Duncan and Meyer's vision for Silver Oak was to devote all their resources to producing a single wine – Cabernet Sauvignon. Silver Oak remains true to that vision today.

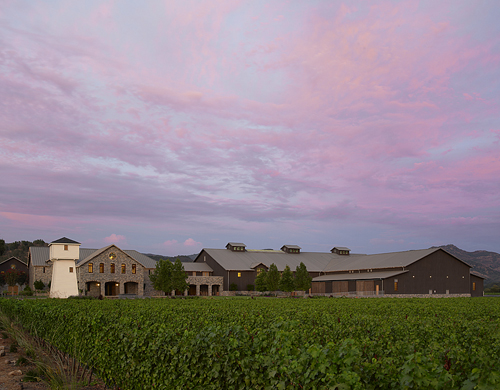
Silver Oak Cellars, Oakville

In 1972, Duncan purchased a dairy farm in Oakville, Napa Valley, which is the site where the Silver Oak Napa Valley winery stands today. It was on this dairy farm in 1972 where Silver Oak's first vintage was produced using grapes from Silver Oak's Alexander Valley vineyards. Duncan and Meyer made the decision to produce only Cabernet Sauvignon and to attempt to produce the finest in the world, to age the wine exclusively in American oak barrels for 25 months and for an additional 15–20 months in bottle prior to release. Silver Oak produced 1,100 cases of 1972 North Coast Cabernet Sauvignon, Silver Oak's first wine. That same year, Duncan and Meyer began planting Silver Oak's first Napa Valley vineyard. Seven years later, Silver Oak harvested the grapes for the company's first Napa Valley Cabernet Sauvignon.

Growth of the company from 1977 onwards enabled Silver Oak to purchase further vineyards in the 1980s and early 1990s, becoming one of the most successful Cabernet Sauvignon brands of the 1980s. In January 2001, co-founder Justin Meyer sold his share of the company to Ray Duncan.

In 1998, Duncan was named Wildcatter of the Year by the Independent Petroleum Association of Mountain States, and in 2004 was inducted into the Rocky Mountain Oil & Gas Hall of Fame. In 2012, Duncan was inducted into the Colorado Business Hall of Fame and is also an inductee in the Colorado Ski and Snowboard Hall of Fame. He has been involved in numerous philanthropic pursuits, including his alma mater, the University of Notre Dame, which named Duncan Hall (a men's dormitory) and the Duncan Student Center after him, and has provided investment into the Crow Canyon Archaeological Center near Cortez, Colorado, the Denver Art Museum, and Castle Pines Golf Club, of which he founded. On October 9, 2015, Duncan died in Denver at the age of 84.

== Family business and legacy ==
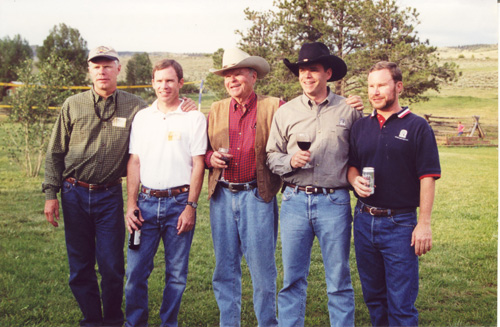
The Duncan family, (Ray Duncan in the centre)

Duncan has four sons, Michael, Kevin, Tim, and David. David Duncan is President and CEO of Duncan Oil Inc., and Silver Oak, and Tim Duncan is Silver Oak's Vice President. Both serve as managing Partners for the family's second winery, Twomey Cellars, which Ray Duncan founded with his four sons. Michael Duncan manages the Duncans' Diamond Tail Ranch on the Laramie River in northern Colorado and Kevin Duncan is vice president of Denver-based Duncan Oil. Pat Kettles of The Anniston Star stated that Duncan is "constantly looking for ways to improve Silver Oak by acquiring properties whose fruit reflects the unique flavors of their terroir. He works to maintain vineyard properties by farming sustainably, thus preserving Silver Oak’s heritage for future generations." As of 2012, Duncan was still signing autographs at Silver Oak release gatherings.
