= List of shipwrecks in January 1822 =

The list of shipwrecks in January 1822 includes ships sunk, foundered, grounded, or otherwise lost during January 1822.

== 1 January ==
List of shipwrecks: 1 January 1822
Ship	State	Description
Delight	United Kingdom	The ship was driven ashore and wrecked on the Isle of Jura. Her crew were rescued. She was on a voyage from Wick, Caithness to Belfast, County Antrim.
Sea Lark	(United Kingdom of Great Britain and Ireland) Jersey	The ship was wrecked at Jersey.
Trio	United Kingdom	The ship was run down and sunk in the River Thames by Nancy (United Kingdom).

== 2 January ==
List of shipwrecks: 2 January 1822
Ship	State	Description
Helen	United Kingdom	The ship was wrecked in the Atlantic Ocean with the loss of five of the nine people on board, The survivors were rescued on 6 January by Olinde (France).
Heron	United Kingdom	The brig was driven ashore and wrecked near "Kyddion". She was on a voyage from Gravesend, Kent to Amsterdam, North Holland, Netherlands.
Mary Charlotte	United Kingdom	The ship was wrecked on the Bogue Reef, off the coast of Jamaica. She was on a voyage from Falmouth, Cornwall to Kingston, Jamaica.

== 3 January ==
List of shipwrecks: 3 January 1822
Ship	State	Description
Doris	Hamburg	The ship was driven ashore and damaged at Ramsgate, Kent, United Kingdom. She was on a voyage from Hamburg to Gibraltar. Doris was refloated on 4 January and taken in to Ramsgate for repairs.
Minerva	United Kingdom	The ship was driven onto the Foreness Rock, near Margate, Kent. She was on a voyage from Limerick to London. Minerva was refloated on 7 January and taken in to Margate.
Syren	United States	The ship was wrecked at Arcachon, Gironde, France. Her crew were rescued. She was on a voyage from Boston, Massachusetts to Bilbao, Spain.
Two Brothers	United Kingdom	The ship departed from Liverpool, Lancashire for Madeira, Portugal. No further trace, presumed foundered with the loss of all hands.
Woodman	United Kingdom	The ship capsized in a squall with the loss of three of her crew. Survivors were rescued by Draco ( Grand Duchy of Tuscany). Woodman was on a voyage from Saint John, New Brunswick, British North America to Barbados.

== 4 January ==
List of shipwrecks: 4 January 1822
Ship	State	Description
Amitié	France	The ship was driven ashore at Angoulins, Charente-Maritime.
Bengali	France	The ship was driven ashore at Talais, Gironde. She was later refloated and taken in to "Pauellac".
Lark	United Kingdom	The sloop ran aground on the Long Sand, in the Thames Estuary off Faversham, Kent with the loss of all hands. She was on a voyage from London to Newhaven, Sussex. Lark was refloated on 10 January and taken in to Whitstable, Kent.
Two Brothers	United Kingdom	The ship departed from Liverpool, Lancashire for Madeira, Portugal. No further trace, presumed foundered with the loss of all hands.

== 5 January ==
List of shipwrecks: 5 January 1822
Ship	State	Description
Ann	United Kingdom	The ship was wrecked on the Heaps Sand, in the North Sea off the coast of Essex. Her crew were rescued by Providence (United Kingdom).
Canso	(United Kingdom of Great Britain and Ireland) British North America	The ship was driven ashore 2 leagues (6 nautical miles (11 km)) west of Havana, Cuba. She was on a voyage from Jamaica to Bermuda.
Clio	United Kingdom	The ship was driven ashore at Harwich, Essex. She was on a voyage from Memel, Prussia to London. Clio was later refloated and taken in to Harwich.
Glentanner	United Kingdom	The ship collided with New John and was beached at Holyhead, Anglesey. She was on a voyage from Liverpool, Lancashire to Limerick. Glentanner was refloated on 8 January and taken in to Liverpool.
Lark	United Kingdom	The ship ran aground on the Colombine Sand, in the North Sea off Faversham, Kent. She was on a voyage from London to Newhaven, Sussex.
Louisa Charlotta	Netherlands	The galiot was lost on the Long Sand, in the North Sea with the loss of all but one of her crew. She was on a voyage from Riga, Russia to Dunkirk, Nord, France.
Mary	United Kingdom	The sloop was run down and sunk in the River Mersey. She was on a voyage from Liverpool to Dublin.
William	United Kingdom	The ship was driven ashore at Great Yarmouth, Norfolk. She was later refloated and taken in to Great Yarmouth.

== 6 January ==
List of shipwrecks: 6 January 1822
Ship	State	Description
Glentanner	United Kingdom	The ship was in collision with New John (United Kingdom) in the River Mersey and was beached at Hoylake, Lancashire. She was on a voyage from Liverpool, Lancashire to Limerick.
Helen	United Kingdom	The ship was abandoned in the Atlantic Ocean. She was on a voyage from Newfoundland to Liverpool.
Horatio	United Kingdom	The ship foundered in the Irish Sea off Point Lynas, Anglesey. She was on a voyage from Liverpool to Waterford.

== 7 January ==
List of shipwrecks: 7 January 1822
Ship	State	Description
Economy	United Kingdom	The ship sprang a leak and foundered in the English Channel off The Lizard, Cornwall. Her crew were rescued by Aurora (United Kingdom). She was on a voyage from London to Chepstow, Monmouthshire.
Mary	United Kingdom	The ship foundered off St. Ives, Cornwall.
Thomas and Ann	United Kingdom	The sloop was driven ashore and wrecked 4 nautical miles (7.4 km) north of Girvan, Ayrshire. Her crew were rescued. She was on a voyage from Dublin to Port Glasgow, Renfrewshire.

== 8 January ==
List of shipwrecks: 8 January 1822
Ship	State	Description
Margaretha	Russia	The ship struck the pier and sank at Jersey, Channel Islands. She was on a voyage from Saint Petersburg to Jersey.
Rotterdam	Netherlands	The ship was lost on the Flemish Banks, in the North Sea. She was on a voyage from Rotterdam, South Holland to Surinam.

== 10 January ==
List of shipwrecks: 10 January 1822
Ship	State	Description
Fly	United Kingdom	The ship foundered in the Firth of Forth with the loss of all hands.

== 11 January ==
List of shipwrecks: 11 January 1822
Ship	State	Description
Æolus	United Kingdom	The ship ran aground in the River Suir at Faithlegg, County Waterford and was severely damaged. Æolus was refloated on 25 January.
Briton	United Kingdom	The ship struck a rock and foundered in the Atlantic Ocean off Cape St. Vincent, Portugal. Her crew were rescued by Agenora (United Kingdom) She was on a voyage from London to Gibraltar.
Margaretta	(United Kingdom of Great Britain and Ireland) Jersey	The ship struck the pier and sank at Jersey. She was on a voyage from Saint Petersburg, Russia to Jersey.

== 12 January ==
List of shipwrecks: 12 January 1822
Ship	State	Description
Indian Chief	United Kingdom	The brig was wrecked on the north coast of Bermuda. She was on a voyage from Kingston, Jamaica to New Brunswick, British North America.

== 14 January ==
List of shipwrecks: 14 January 1822
Ship	State	Description
Ann	United Kingdom	The brig was driven ashore and damaged at Whitby, Yorkshire. She was refloated on 24 January and taken in to Whitby.
Betty	United Kingdom	The brig was driven ashore between Troon and Irvine, Ayrshire. Her crew were rescued.
Elizabeth	United Kingdom	The ship was driven ashore and damaged at Holyhead, Anglesey. Her crew were rescued. She was on a voyage from Waterford to Liverpool, Lancashire. Elizabeth was refloated on 17 January and taken in to Holyhead.
Fleece	United Kingdom	The brig was driven ashore between Troon and Irvine. Her crew were rescued. She was later refloated.
Frances and Lucy	United Kingdom	The ship was wrecked on the Florida Reef. She was on a voyage from Jamaica to Halifax, British North America.
Lady Forbes	United Kingdom	The vessel, of Leith, was driven ashore at Longhope. She was carrying herrings to London. Her crew were rescued.
Thomas and Ann	United Kingdom	The ship was driven ashore and wrecked at Turnberry Castle, Ayrshire. Her crew were rescued. She was on a voyage from Dublin to Glasgow, Renfrewshire.
Thomas and Mary	United Kingdom	The ship was driven ashore and wrecked at Turnberry, Ayrshire. Her crew were rescued. She was on a voyage from Dublin to Glasgow, Renfrewshire.

== 15 January ==
List of shipwrecks: 15 January 1822
Ship	State	Description
Christiana	United Kingdom	The schooner was driven ashore at Longhope. Orkney Islands. Her crew were rescued. Sje was later refloated and taken in to Stromness, Orkney Islands for repairs.
Lady Perth	United Kingdom	The ship was driven ashore at Longhope. She was later refloated and taken in to Stromness for repairs.
Lively	United Kingdom	The schooner was driven ashore at Longhope. Her crew were rescued. She was later refloated and taken in to Stromness for repairs.

== 16 January ==
List of shipwrecks: 16 January 1822
Ship	State	Description
Vrow Hendrika	Netherlands	The ship was wrecked at Bandol, Var, France.

== 18 January ==
List of shipwrecks: 18 January 1822
Ship	State	Description
Aurora	United Kingdom	The ship was beached at Malta. She was on a voyage from Malta to Gibraltar. Aurora was declared a total loss.
Concordia	United Kingdom	The ship foundered in the Atlantic Ocean. Her crew were rescued by Henry (Denmark). She was on a voyage from Portsmouth, Hampshire to Havana, Cuba.

== 19 January ==
List of shipwrecks: 19 January 1822
Ship	State	Description
Hope	(United Kingdom of Great Britain and Ireland) Jamaica	The brig was wrecked on Great Heneaga, Bahamas. She was on a voyage from Kingston, Jamaica to Saint John, New Brunswick, British North America.
Martins	(United Kingdom of Great Britain and Ireland) Jamaica	The brig was wrecked off Cartagena, Colombia. She was on a voyage from Kingston to Saint-Domingue.

== 20 January ==
List of shipwrecks: 20 January 1822
Ship	State	Description
Active	United Kingdom	The ship was wrecked on Sylt, Duchy of Schleswig. She was on a voyage from "Schien" to Guernsey, Channel Islands.
Countess of Dalhousie	(United Kingdom of Great Britain and Ireland) British North America	The ship was driven ashore and wrecked at Madeira, Portugal.
St. Jose	Spain	The schooner was driven ashore and wrecked at Madeira.

== 21 January ==
List of shipwrecks: 21 January 1822
Ship	State	Description
George Bickerton	United Kingdom	The ship departed from Jamaica for Cork. No further trace, presumed foundered with the loss of all hands.

== 23 January ==
List of shipwrecks: 23 January 1822
Ship	State	Description
Mary	United Kingdom	The ship was lost at Aberdeen.

== 24 January ==
List of shipwrecks: 24 January 1822
Ship	State	Description
Elizabeth Johanna	Netherlands	The ship sank at Padstow, Cornwall, United Kingdom. She was on a voyage from Batavia, Netherlands East Indies to Rotterdam, South Holland.
Friends	United Kingdom	The ship was driven ashore and wrecked on the Isle of Islay. She was on a voyage from Beaumaris, Anglesey to Galway.
Speculation	United Kingdom	The ship sank at Bristol, Gloucestershire. She was later refloated.

== 25 January ==
List of shipwrecks: 25 January 1822
Ship	State	Description
Amity	United Kingdom	The ship was driven ashore near Ayr. She was on a voyage from Ayr to Dublin. Amity was refloated on 28 January.
Betsey	United Kingdom	The ship foundered off Inverkip, Renfrewshire with the loss of all hands She was on a voyage from Greenock, Renfrewshire to Tobermory, Isle of Mull.
Lisbon Packet	United Kingdom	The ship was driven ashore in the River Mersey. She was later refloated and taken in to the Queen's Dock, Liverpool, Lancashire.

== 26 January ==
List of shipwrecks: 26 January 1822
Ship	State	Description
Amazon	United States	The ship was wrecked in the Abaco Islands.
Compagnon	Sweden	The ship was lost on this date. Her crew were rescued. She was on a voyage from Gothenburg to London, United Kingdom.
Ranger	United States	The ship was wrecked in the Abaco Islands. She was on a voyage from Charleston, South Carolina to Havana, Cuba.
Union	United Kingdom	The ship was wrecked at Cefalù, Sicily. She was on a voyage from Trieste to Liverpool, Lancashire.

== 27 January ==
List of shipwrecks: 27 January 1822
Ship	State	Description
Loyalty	United Kingdom	The ship was wrecked on the Hogsty Reef. Her crew were rescued. She was on a voyage from Jamaica to London.

== 28 January ==
List of shipwrecks: 28 January 1822
Ship	State	Description
Hind	United Kingdom	The ship was driven ashore at Sandy Hook, New Jersey, United States. She was on a voyage from Dundee, Forfarshire to New York, United States.
Sunderland	United Kingdom	The ship sank at Great Yarmouth, Norfolk.

== 29 January ==
List of shipwrecks: 29 January 1822
Ship	State	Description
Jane	United Kingdom	The ship was driven ashore at the mouth of the River Plate. She was on a voyage from London to "Bona Vista", Montevideo, Brazil and Buenos Aires, Argentina.

== 30 January ==
List of shipwrecks: 30 January 1822
Ship	State	Description
Nelly	United Kingdom	The ship departed from Saint John, New Brunswick, British North America for Liverpool, Lancashire. No further trace, presumed foundered in the Atlantic Ocean with the loss of akk hands.

== 31 January ==
List of shipwrecks: 31 January 1822
Ship	State	Description
Nelson	United Kingdom	The brig was wrecked on the coast of East Florida, New Spain. Her crew were rescued.

== Unknown date ==
List of shipwrecks: Unknown date in January 1822
Ship	State	Description
Alexander	United Kingdom	The ship was captured by pirates off Cape San Antonio, Cuba with the loss of two of her crew. She was set afire and sunk. She was on a voyage from London to Havana, Cuba.
Amazon	United States	The ship was lost in the Abaco Islands.
Atlantic	United Kingdom	The ship was wrecked on the north coast of Jamaica. She was on a voyage from Kingston, Jamaica to Saint Kitts.
Betty	Sweden	The ship was wrecked on the Goodwin Sands, Kent, United Kingdom. She was on a voyage from Gothenburg to Gibraltar.
Ceres	United Kingdom	The ship was wrecked on Mayo Island, Cape Verde Islands, Portugal. She was on a voyage from Gambia to the Cape Verde Islands.
Concordia	Netherlands	The ship was abandoned off Strömstadt, Sweden and subsequently came ashore there. She was on a voyage from Riga, Russia to Amsterdam, North Holland.
Cumberland	United Kingdom	The ship was driven ashore near Beaumaris, Anglesey. She was on a voyage from Whitehaven, Cumberland to Jamaica. Cumberland was later refloated and taken in to Liverpool, Lancashire for repairs.
Curlew	United States	The ship was lost in the Abaco Islands.
Eglé	France	The ship was holed by her anchor off Cherbourg, Seine-Inférieure and was beached. She was on a voyage from Havre de Grâce, Seine-Inférieure to Guadeloupe.
Eliza	United Kingdom	The ship was lost in the Bristol Channel on or before 3 January. She was on a voyage from Waterford to Bristol, Gloucestershire.
Hoffnung	Netherlands	The ship was lost off Liebau, Prussia. She was on a voyage from Schiedam, South Holland to Liebau.
Hope	United Kingdom	The ship sank at Buenos Aires, Argentina before 10 January.
Isabella	United Kingdom	The ship was driven ashore on Walney Island, Cumberland. She was later refloated and taken in to Annan, Dumfriesshire.
Jane	United Kingdom	The ship was wrecked on Cross Island, Maine, United States. She was on a voyage from Jamaica to Saint John, New Brunswick, British North America.
Jane and Ann	United Kingdom	The ship was driven ashore and wrecked in Swansea Bay.
John & Robert	(United Kingdom of Great Britain and Ireland) British North America	The ship was abandoned in the Atlantic Ocean before 17 January. Her crew were rescued by Eugene (France).
Juliana	Netherlands	The ship was lost on the Kentish Knock before 18 January.
Lady Kinnaird	United Kingdom	The ship was wrecked off Lindisfarne, Northumberland. She was on a voyage from Dundee, Forfarshire to London.
Lagom	Sweden	The ship was wrecked on Flores Island, Azores, Portugal. She was on a voyage from Gothenburg to New York, United States.
Marianne	Prussia	The ship was wrecked on Ameland, Friesland, Netherlands before 19 January. She was on a voyage from Königsberg to London.
Ranger	United States	The ship was lost in the Abaco Islands.
Redligheten	Netherlands	The ship was wrecked on the Goodwin Sands. She was on a voyage from Rotterdam, South Holland to Marseille, Bouches-du-Rhône, France.
Rising Sun	United Kingdom	The schooner was abandoned in the Atlantic Ocean. Her crew were rescued by an American ship. She was on a voyage from St. John's, Newfoundland, British North America to the Clyde.
Rose	United Kingdom	The ship was driven ashore at Lavau-sur-Loire, Loire-Inférieure, France. She was later refloated and taken in to Paimbœuf, Loire-Inférieure.
Two Brothers	United Kingdom	The ship was wrecked on the coast of Nova Scotia, British North America in mid-January. Her crew were rescued. She was on a voyage from Saint John, New Brunswick, British North America to Antigua.
Two Brothers	United Kingdom	The ship departed from Liverpool for Madeira. No further trace, presumed foundered with the loss of all hands.
Volant	United States	The ship was wrecked at Newburyport, Massachusetts.
Vrow Jantina	Netherlands	The ship foundered off Vlieland, Friesland. She was on a voyage from Saint Petersburg, Russia to Amsterdam, North Holland.
Wellington	United Kingdom	The ship was wrecked on Saaremaa, Russia in early January. She was on a voyage from Saint Petersburg, Russia to Liverpool.
York Merchant	United Kingdom	The ship was driven ashore near Lindesnes, Norway and was abandoned by her crew. She was on a voyage from Wisbech, County Durham to Sunderland, County Durham.
