= Bégadan =

- Commune
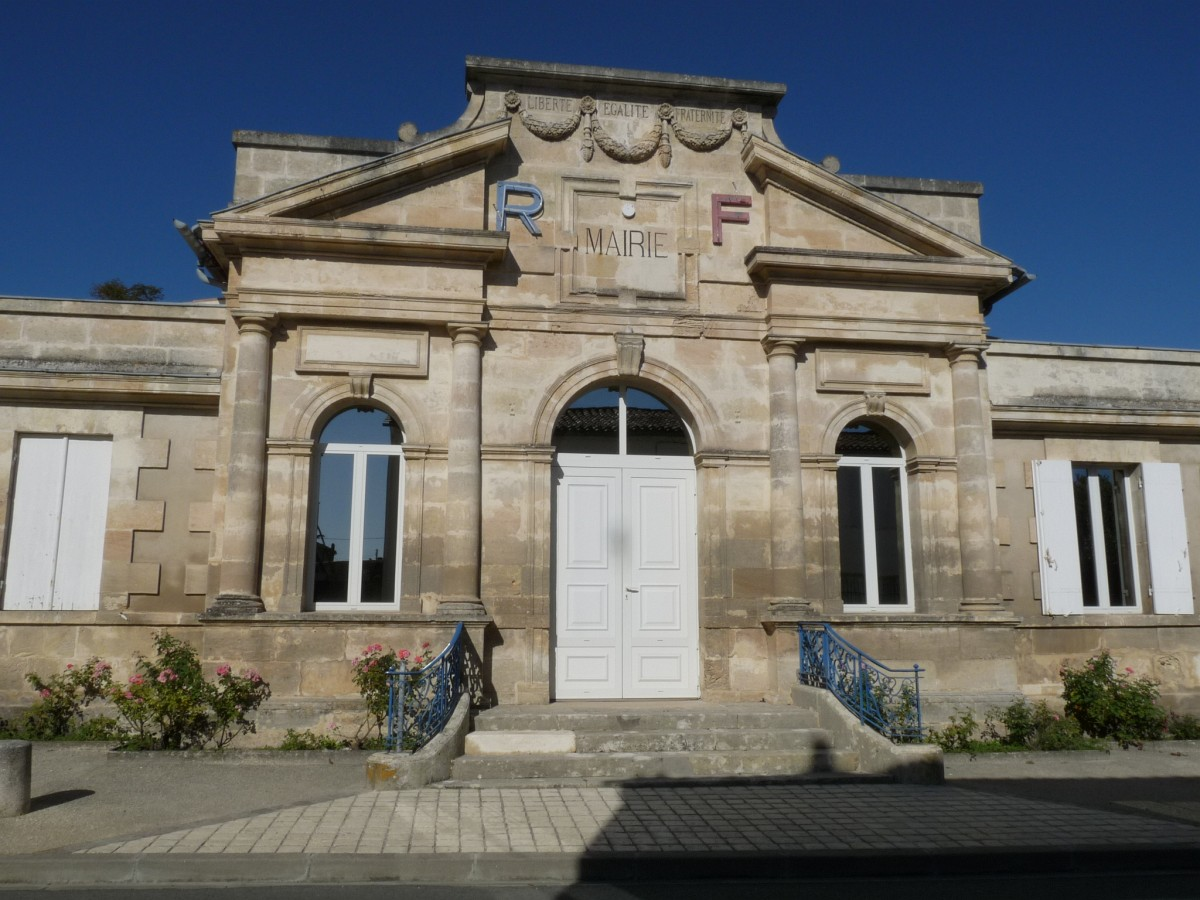
- The town hall in Bégadan
- Location of Bégadan
- Location within France Location within Nouvelle-Aquitaine
- Coordinates: 45°21′27″N 0°53′33″W
- Country: France
- Region: Nouvelle-Aquitaine
- Department: Gironde
- Arrondissement: Lesparre-Médoc
- Canton: Le Nord-Médoc

Government
  - Mayor (2020–2026): Jean-Robert Duhet
- Area^{1}: 22.15 km^{2} (8.55 sq mi)
- Elevation: 12 m (39 ft)
- Highest elevation: 18 m (59 ft)
- Lowest elevation: 0 m (0 ft)
- Population (2023): 893
  - Density: 40.3/km^{2} (104/sq mi)
- Time zone: UTC+01:00 (CET)
  - Summer (DST): UTC+02:00 (CEST)
- INSEE/Postal code: 33038 /33340
- ^{1} French Land Register data, which excludes lakes, ponds, glaciers > 1 km^{2} (0.386 sq mi or 247 acres) and river estuaries.

Bégadan (French pronunciation: [beɡadɑ̃]; Occitan: Vegadan) is a commune in the Gironde department in southwestern France.

== Population ==
Historical population
Year	Pop.	±% p.a.
1968	932	—
1975	846	−1.37%
1982	832	−0.24%
1990	913	+1.17%
1999	877	−0.45%
2007	891	+0.20%
2012	919	+0.62%
2017	909	−0.22%
2023	893	−0.30%
Source: INSEE

== See also ==
- Communes of the Gironde department
