= Couquèques =

- Commune
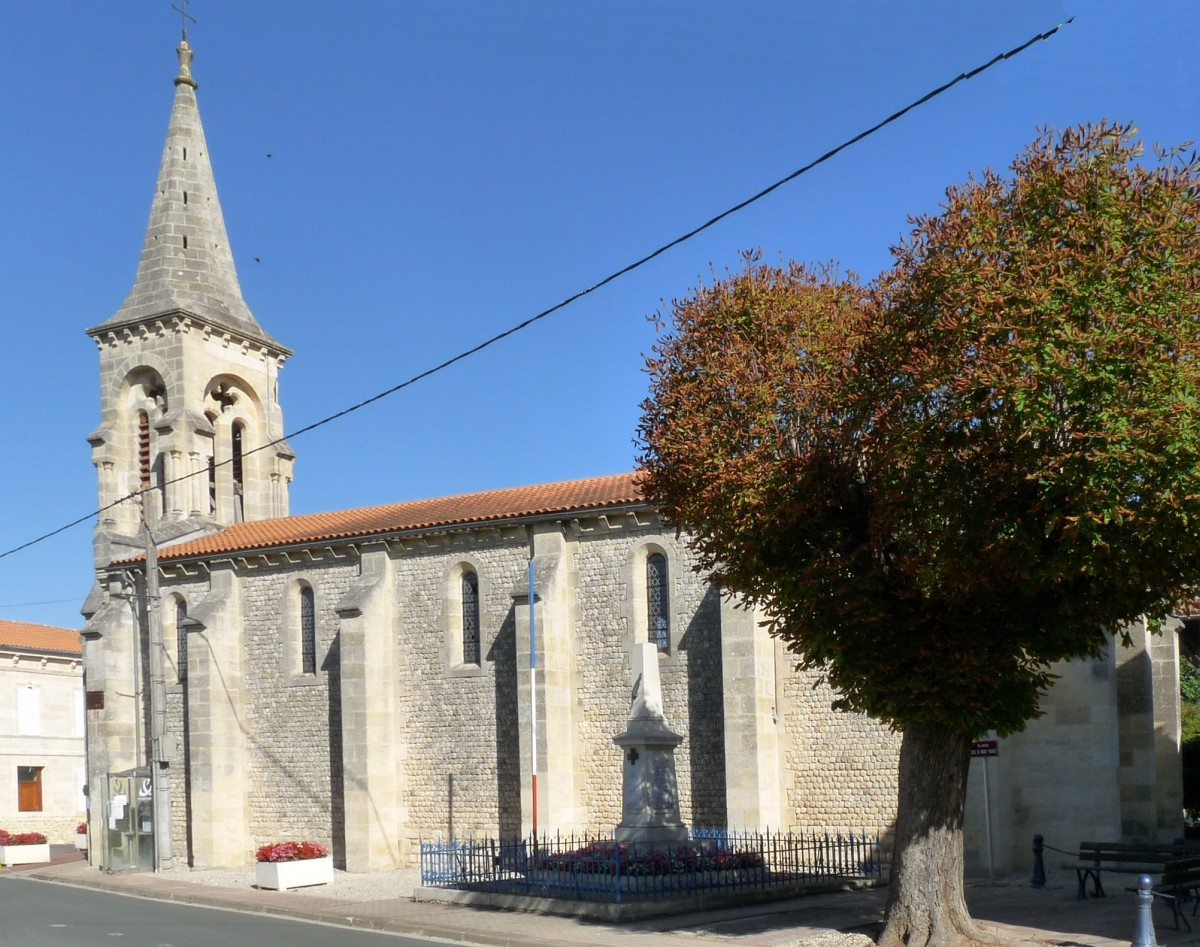
- The church in Couquèques
- Location of Couquèques
- Location within France Location within Nouvelle-Aquitaine
- Coordinates: 45°20′43″N 0°50′54″W
- Country: France
- Region: Nouvelle-Aquitaine
- Department: Gironde
- Arrondissement: Lesparre-Médoc
- Canton: Le Nord-Médoc

Government
  - Mayor (2020–2026): Éric Rojo
- Area^{1}: 6.33 km^{2} (2.44 sq mi)
- Elevation: 7 m (23 ft)
- Highest elevation: 13 m (43 ft)
- Lowest elevation: 3 m (9.8 ft)
- Population (2023): 270
  - Density: 43/km^{2} (110/sq mi)
- Time zone: UTC+01:00 (CET)
  - Summer (DST): UTC+02:00 (CEST)
- INSEE/Postal code: 33134 /33340
- ^{1} French Land Register data, which excludes lakes, ponds, glaciers > 1 km^{2} (0.386 sq mi or 247 acres) and river estuaries.

Couquèques (French pronunciation: [kukɛk]; Occitan: Coquèca) is a commune in the Gironde department in Nouvelle-Aquitaine in southwestern France.

== Population ==
Historical population
Year	Pop.	±% p.a.
1968	207	—
1975	193	−1.00%
1982	195	+0.15%
1990	195	+0.00%
1999	209	+0.77%
2007	239	+1.69%
2012	257	+1.46%
2017	272	+1.14%
2023	270	−0.12%
Source: INSEE

== See also ==
- Communes of the Gironde department
