= Grayan-et-l'Hôpital =

- Commune
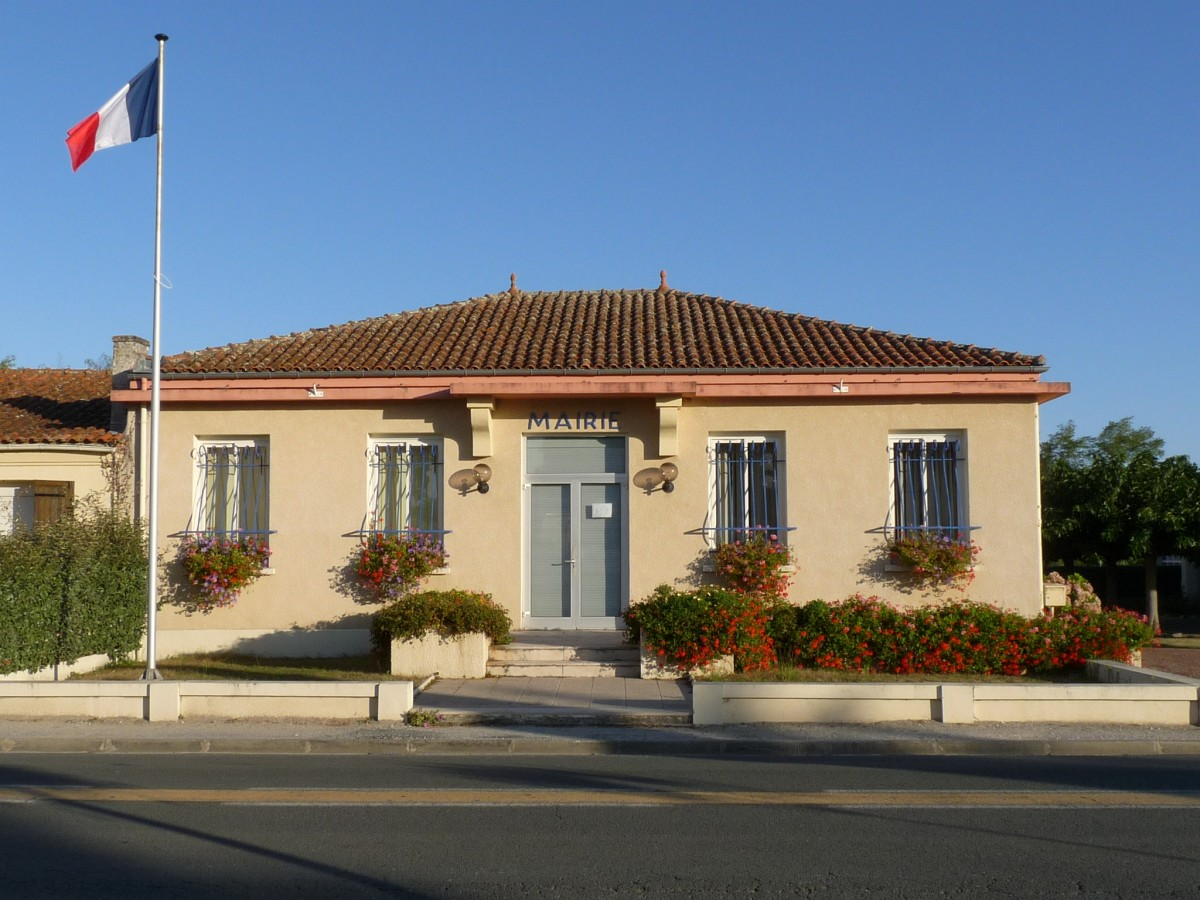
- The town hall in Grayan

- Coat of arms
- Location of Grayan-et-l'Hôpital
- Location within France Location within Nouvelle-Aquitaine
- Coordinates: 45°26′39″N 1°05′23″W
- Country: France
- Region: Nouvelle-Aquitaine
- Department: Gironde
- Arrondissement: Lesparre-Médoc
- Canton: Le Nord-Médoc

Government
  - Mayor (2024–2026): Jacky Nicaise
- Area^{1}: 45.4 km^{2} (17.5 sq mi)
- Elevation: 3 m (9.8 ft)
- Highest elevation: 35 m (115 ft)
- Lowest elevation: 0 m (0 ft)
- Population (2023): 1,542
  - Density: 34.0/km^{2} (88.0/sq mi)
- Time zone: UTC+01:00 (CET)
  - Summer (DST): UTC+02:00 (CEST)
- INSEE/Postal code: 33193 /33590
- ^{1} French Land Register data, which excludes lakes, ponds, glaciers > 1 km^{2} (0.386 sq mi or 247 acres) and river estuaries.

Grayan-et-l'Hôpital (French pronunciation: [gʁajɑ̃ e lopital]; Occitan: Graian e l'Espitau) is a commune in the Gironde department in southwestern France.

== Population ==
Historical population
Year	Pop.	±% p.a.
1968	508	—
1975	534	+0.72%
1982	553	+0.50%
1990	617	+1.38%
1999	728	+1.86%
2007	1,011	+4.19%
2012	1,265	+4.58%
2017	1,371	+1.62%
2023	1,542	+1.98%
Source: INSEE

== See also ==
- Communes of the Gironde department
