= Lesparre-Médoc =

- Subprefecture and commune
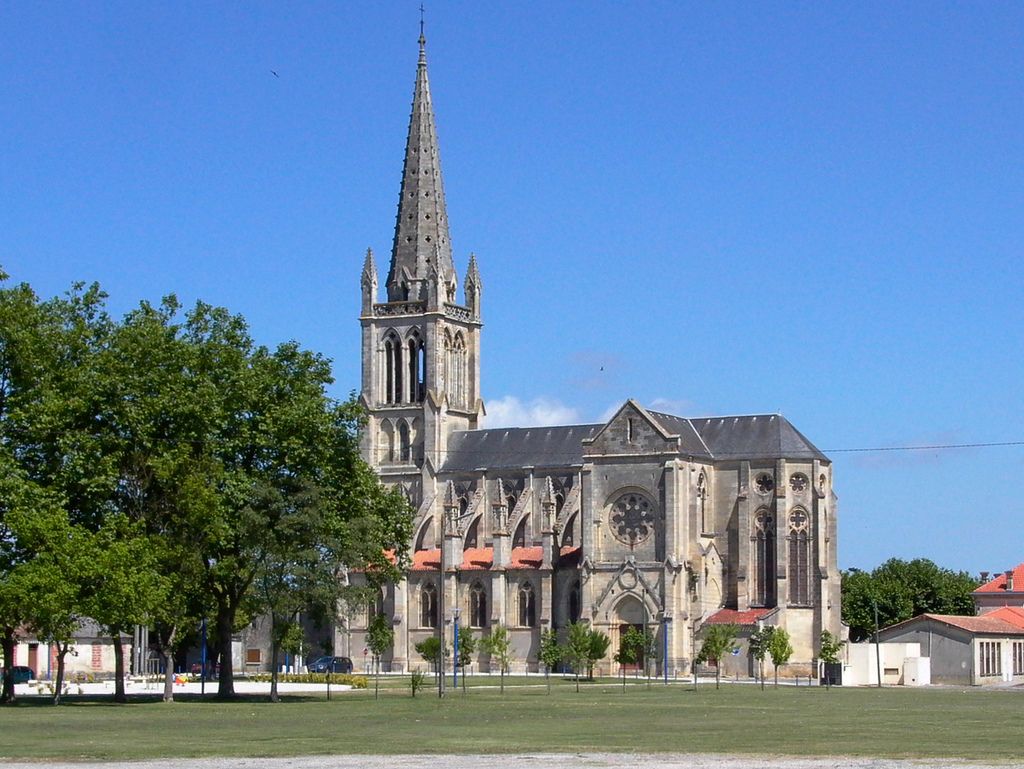
- The church in Lesparre

- Coat of arms
- Location of Lesparre-Médoc
- Location within France Location within Nouvelle-Aquitaine
- Coordinates: 45°18′28″N 0°56′11″W
- Country: France
- Region: Nouvelle-Aquitaine
- Department: Gironde
- Arrondissement: Lesparre-Médoc
- Canton: Le Nord-Médoc

Government
  - Mayor (2020–2026): Bernard Guiraud
- Area^{1}: 36.97 km^{2} (14.27 sq mi)
- Elevation: 4 m (13 ft)
- Highest elevation: 34 m (112 ft)
- Lowest elevation: 7 m (23 ft)
- Population (2023): 5,872
  - Density: 158.8/km^{2} (411.4/sq mi)
- Time zone: UTC+01:00 (CET)
  - Summer (DST): UTC+02:00 (CEST)
- INSEE/Postal code: 33240 /33340
- ^{1} French Land Register data, which excludes lakes, ponds, glaciers > 1 km^{2} (0.386 sq mi or 247 acres) and river estuaries.

Lesparre-Médoc (French pronunciation: [lɛspaʁ medɔk]; Occitan: L'Esparra de Medòc, [lespaˈra ˈde meˈðɔk]), commonly known as Lesparre (L'Esparra), is a commune in the Gironde department, Nouvelle-Aquitaine, southwestern France. It is a sub-prefecture of the department.

== Geography ==
Lesparre is on the Médoc peninsula about 80 km north of Bordeaux.

== History ==
Traces of human occupation from the Neolithic era have been discovered in the town. Before the arrival of the Romans, the area was inhabited by the Biturges, a Celtic tribe. After the Roman Empire collapsed, various peoples such as the Arabs and Normans came into the area. During the rule of Charlemagne, a castle was built to protect the town from further invasions. In the High Middle Ages it was the site of castle. The troubadour Aimeric de Belenoi was born here. In 1790, the town was promoted to district capital. During WWII, the town was the site of guerilla warfare with German troops. During the 20th century, the infrastructure of the town was expanded and the population grew to over 5,000 people.

== Population ==
Historical population

Year	Pop.	±% p.a.
1793	818	—
1800	800	−0.32%
1806	919	+2.34%
1821	950	+0.22%
1831	1,232	+2.63%
1836	1,404	+2.65%
1841	1,521	+1.61%
1846	1,605	+1.08%
1851	1,677	+0.88%
1856	3,482	+15.73%
1861	3,633	+0.85%
1866	3,726	+0.51%
1872	3,656	−0.32%
1876	3,794	+0.93%
1881	4,145	+1.79%
1886	4,059	−0.42%
1891	3,972	−0.43%
1896	4,038	+0.33%
1901	3,959	−0.39%

Year	Pop.	±% p.a.
1906	3,840	−0.61%
1911	3,699	−0.75%
1921	3,267	−1.23%
1926	3,419	+0.91%
1931	3,422	+0.02%
1936	3,219	−1.22%
1946	3,101	−0.37%
1954	3,378	+1.08%
1962	3,443	+0.24%
1968	3,563	+0.57%
1975	3,814	+0.98%
1982	4,217	+1.45%
1990	4,661	+1.26%
1999	4,855	+0.45%
2007	5,258	+1.00%
2012	5,656	+1.47%
2017	5,801	+0.51%
2023	5,872	+0.20%

Source: EHESS and INSEE (1968-2023)

== International relations ==
Lesparre is twinned with Drayton in the Vale of White Horse, Oxfordshire, England.

== Notable persons ==
- Bour de Lesparre, Mercenary captain of the Hundred Years' War

== Climate ==
Climate data for Lesparre-Médoc (1991–2010 normals, extremes 1985–2010)
Month	Jan	Feb	Mar	Apr	May	Jun	Jul	Aug	Sep	Oct	Nov	Dec	Year
Record high °C (°F)	18.4 (65.1)	23.6 (74.5)	26.7 (80.1)	31.5 (88.7)	35.0 (95.0)	38.4 (101.1)	38.1 (100.6)	40.9 (105.6)	36.3 (97.3)	31.5 (88.7)	25.0 (77.0)	22.0 (71.6)	40.9 (105.6)
Mean daily maximum °C (°F)	10.5 (50.9)	11.9 (53.4)	15.3 (59.5)	17.3 (63.1)	21.6 (70.9)	24.7 (76.5)	26.3 (79.3)	27.0 (80.6)	23.7 (74.7)	19.3 (66.7)	13.9 (57.0)	10.7 (51.3)	18.5 (65.3)
Daily mean °C (°F)	6.7 (44.1)	7.2 (45.0)	10.0 (50.0)	11.8 (53.2)	15.8 (60.4)	18.7 (65.7)	20.2 (68.4)	20.6 (69.1)	17.6 (63.7)	14.4 (57.9)	9.7 (49.5)	7.1 (44.8)	13.3 (55.9)
Mean daily minimum °C (°F)	2.9 (37.2)	2.6 (36.7)	4.6 (40.3)	6.3 (43.3)	10.0 (50.0)	12.7 (54.9)	14.2 (57.6)	14.3 (57.7)	11.5 (52.7)	9.5 (49.1)	5.5 (41.9)	3.4 (38.1)	8.1 (46.6)
Record low °C (°F)	−17.0 (1.4)	−10.5 (13.1)	−10.3 (13.5)	−4.1 (24.6)	−0.1 (31.8)	2.5 (36.5)	6.0 (42.8)	5.0 (41.0)	2.2 (36.0)	−3.4 (25.9)	−7.5 (18.5)	−10.1 (13.8)	−17.0 (1.4)
Average precipitation mm (inches)	90.1 (3.55)	64.3 (2.53)	60.1 (2.37)	65.4 (2.57)	60.5 (2.38)	61.3 (2.41)	41.8 (1.65)	50.0 (1.97)	71.6 (2.82)	90.1 (3.55)	117.3 (4.62)	99.7 (3.93)	872.2 (34.34)
Average precipitation days (≥ 1.0 mm)	12.6	10.9	10.4	10.8	9.6	8.0	7.2	7.4	8.6	12.0	14.2	13.4	125.1
Source: Meteociel

== See also ==
- Communes of the Gironde department
