= Vensac =

- Commune
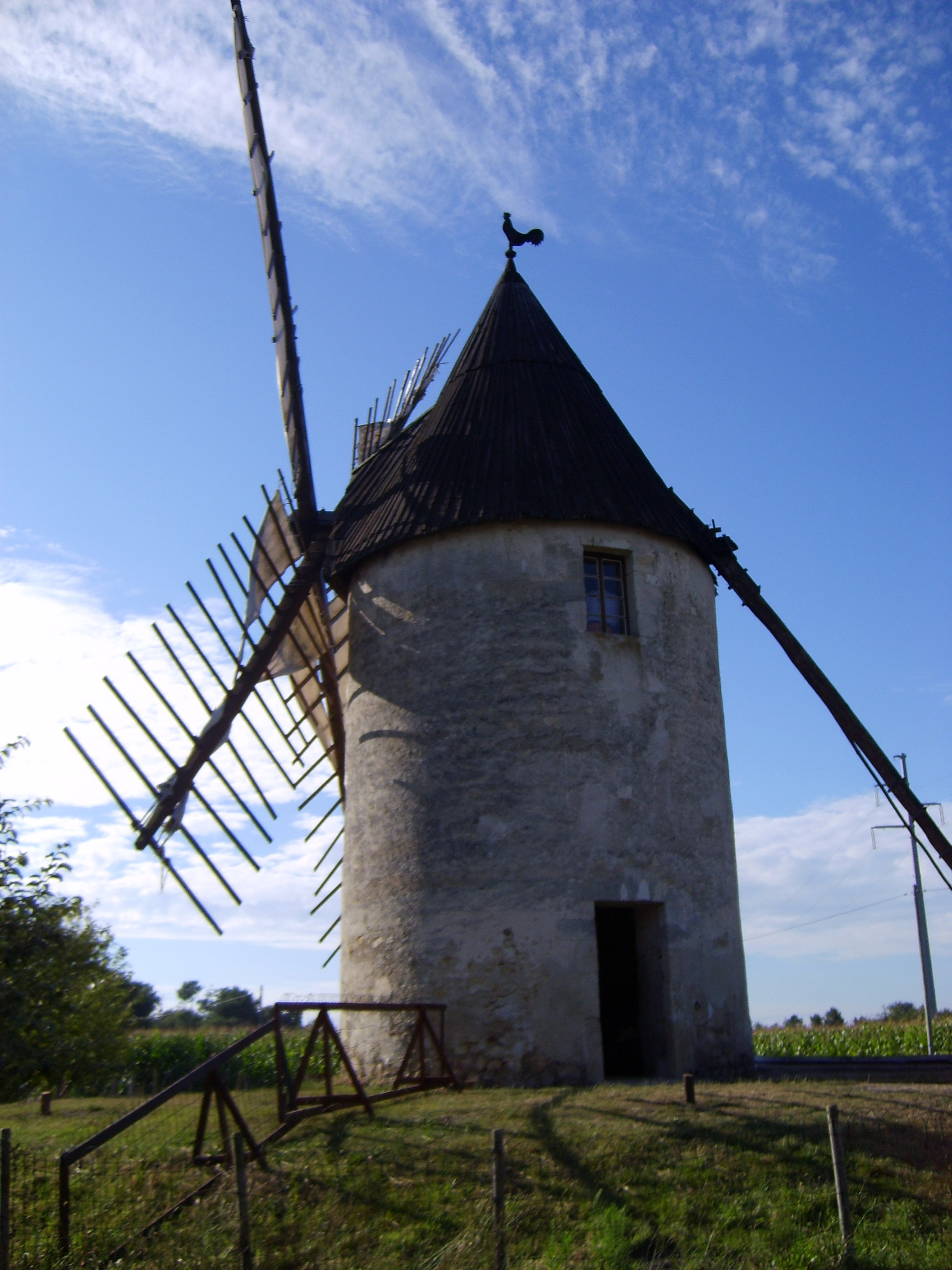
- The windmill in Vensac

- Coat of arms
- Location of Vensac
- Location within France Location within Nouvelle-Aquitaine
- Coordinates: 45°23′56″N 1°02′24″W
- Country: France
- Region: Nouvelle-Aquitaine
- Department: Gironde
- Arrondissement: Lesparre-Médoc
- Canton: Le Nord-Médoc

Government
  - Mayor (2020–2026): Jean-Luc Piquemal
- Area^{1}: 34 km^{2} (13 sq mi)
- Elevation: 4 m (13 ft)
- Highest elevation: 30 m (98 ft)
- Lowest elevation: 0 m (0 ft)
- Population (2023): 1,198
  - Density: 35/km^{2} (91/sq mi)
- Time zone: UTC+01:00 (CET)
  - Summer (DST): UTC+02:00 (CEST)
- INSEE/Postal code: 33541 /33590
- ^{1} French Land Register data, which excludes lakes, ponds, glaciers > 1 km^{2} (0.386 sq mi or 247 acres) and river estuaries.

Vensac (French pronunciation: [vɛ̃sak]; Occitan: Vençac) is a commune in the Gironde department in Nouvelle-Aquitaine in southwestern France.

== Population ==
Historical population
Year	Pop.	±% p.a.
1968	662	—
1975	620	−0.93%
1982	680	+1.33%
1990	658	−0.41%
1999	694	+0.59%
2007	772	+1.34%
2012	932	+3.84%
2017	986	+1.13%
2023	1,198	+3.30%
Source: INSEE

== See also ==
- Communes of the Gironde department
