= Saint-Germain-d'Esteuil =

- Commune
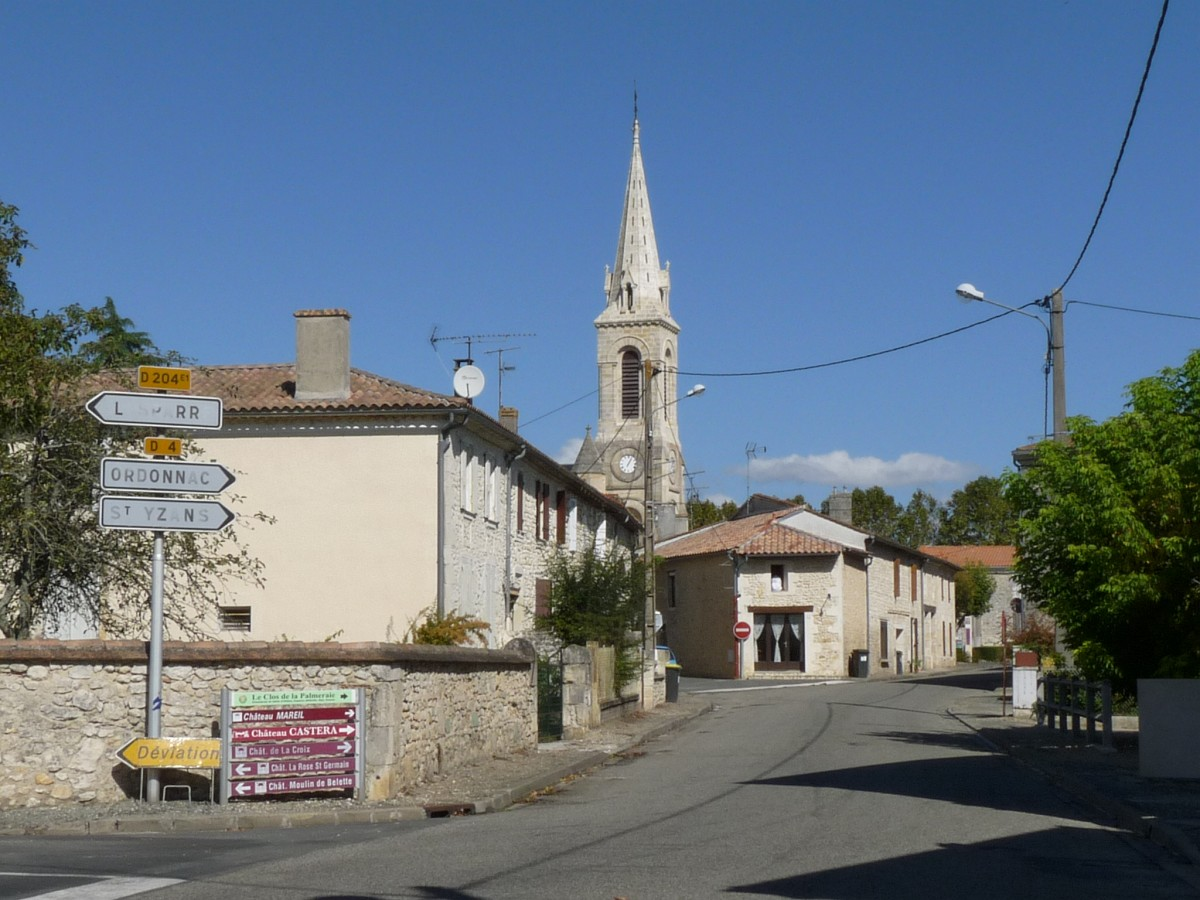
- The church and surroundings in Saint-Germain-d'Esteuil

- Coat of arms
- Location of Saint-Germain-d'Esteuil
- Location within France Location within Nouvelle-Aquitaine
- Coordinates: 45°17′23″N 0°51′57″W
- Country: France
- Region: Nouvelle-Aquitaine
- Department: Gironde
- Arrondissement: Lesparre-Médoc
- Canton: Le Nord-Médoc

Government
  - Mayor (2020–2026): Philippe Buggin
- Area^{1}: 44.35 km^{2} (17.12 sq mi)
- Elevation: 12 m (39 ft)
- Population (2023): 1,365
  - Density: 30.78/km^{2} (79.71/sq mi)
- Time zone: UTC+01:00 (CET)
  - Summer (DST): UTC+02:00 (CEST)
- INSEE/Postal code: 33412 /33340
- ^{1} French Land Register data, which excludes lakes, ponds, glaciers > 1 km^{2} (0.386 sq mi or 247 acres) and river estuaries.

Saint-Germain-d'Esteuil (French pronunciation: [sɛ̃ ʒɛʁmɛ̃ dɛstœj]; Occitan: Sent German d'Estulh) is a commune in the Gironde department in Nouvelle-Aquitaine in southwestern France.

== Population ==
Historical population
Year	Pop.	±% p.a.
1968	1,003	—
1975	764	−3.81%
1982	855	+1.62%
1990	1,020	+2.23%
1999	1,087	+0.71%
2007	1,177	+1.00%
2012	1,195	+0.30%
2017	1,234	+0.64%
2023	1,365	+1.70%
Source: INSEE

== See also ==
- Communes of the Gironde department
