= Naujac-sur-Mer =

- Commune
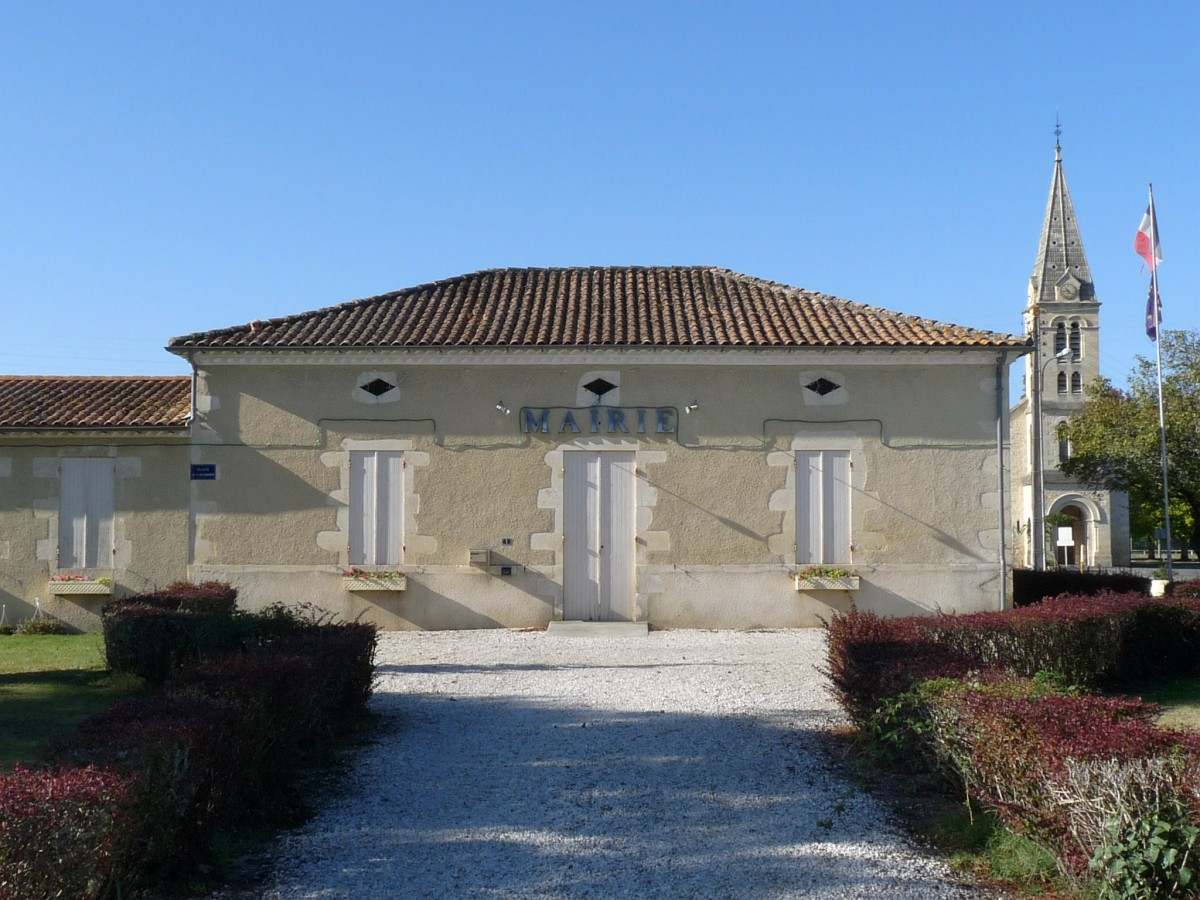
- Town hall
- Location of Naujac-sur-Mer
- Location within France Location within Nouvelle-Aquitaine
- Coordinates: 45°15′19″N 1°01′26″W
- Country: France
- Region: Nouvelle-Aquitaine
- Department: Gironde
- Arrondissement: Lesparre-Médoc
- Canton: Le Nord-Médoc

Government
  - Mayor (2020–2026): Yves Barreau
- Area^{1}: 98.55 km^{2} (38.05 sq mi)
- Elevation: 16 m (52 ft)
- Highest elevation: 61 m (200 ft)
- Lowest elevation: 0 m (0 ft)
- Population (2023): 1,107
  - Density: 11.23/km^{2} (29.09/sq mi)
- Time zone: UTC+01:00 (CET)
  - Summer (DST): UTC+02:00 (CEST)
- INSEE/Postal code: 33300 /33990
- ^{1} French Land Register data, which excludes lakes, ponds, glaciers > 1 km^{2} (0.386 sq mi or 247 acres) and river estuaries.

Naujac-sur-Mer (French pronunciation: [noʒak syʁ mɛʁ], literally Naujac on Sea; Occitan: Naujac sus Mar) is a commune in the Gironde department in Nouvelle-Aquitaine in southwestern France.

== Population ==
Historical population
Year	Pop.	±% p.a.
1968	715	—
1975	641	−1.55%
1982	600	−0.94%
1990	650	+1.01%
1999	631	−0.33%
2007	743	+2.06%
2012	883	+3.51%
2017	1,090	+4.30%
2023	1,107	+0.26%
Source: INSEE

== See also ==
- Communes of the Gironde department
