= Château Saint-Aubin =

Coordinates: 45.413°N 0.947207°W

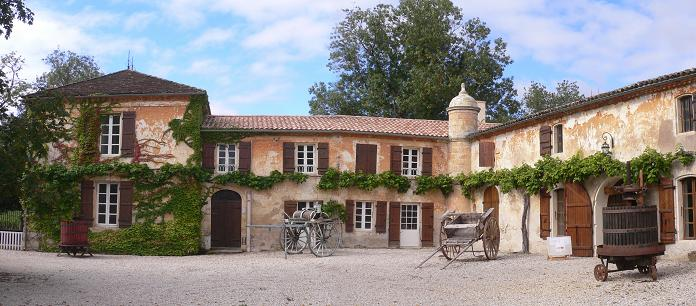
Château Saint-Aubin

The Château Saint-Aubin is a Bordeaux wine producer in Jau-Dignac-et-Loirac, Gironde, France. It is classified as a cru bourgeois in the Médoc appellation. The château is built on a magnificent site overlooking the Gironde estuary, about 70 kilometres north of Bordeaux. Since the 19th century, it has been in the hands of the Saint-Aubin family.
