= Cissac-Médoc =

- Commune
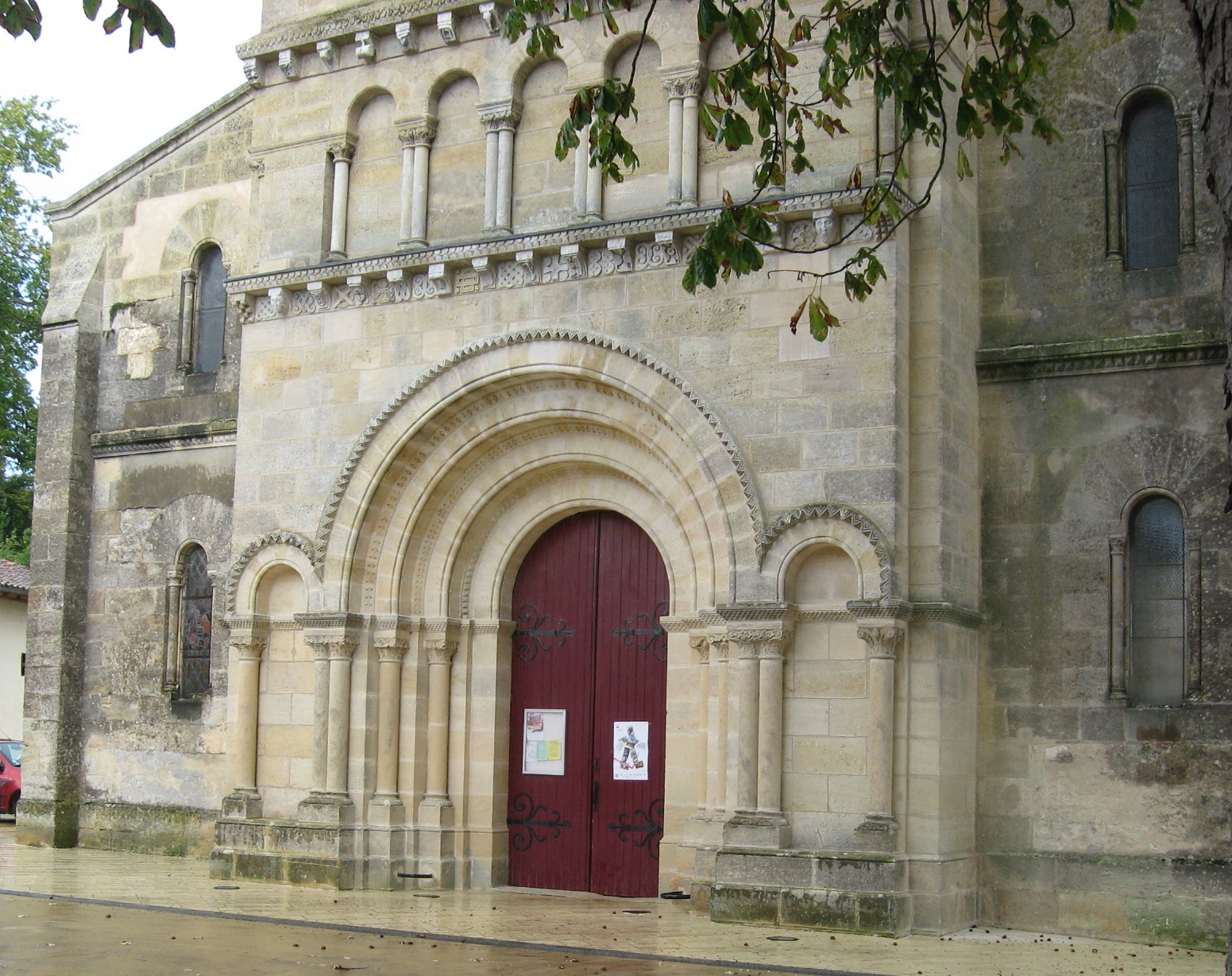
- The church door in Cissac-Médoc

- Coat of arms
- Location of Cissac-Médoc
- Location within France Location within Nouvelle-Aquitaine
- Coordinates: 45°13′40″N 0°49′48″W
- Country: France
- Region: Nouvelle-Aquitaine
- Department: Gironde
- Arrondissement: Lesparre-Médoc
- Canton: Le Nord-Médoc

Government
  - Mayor (2020–2026): Jean Mincoy
- Area^{1}: 23.62 km^{2} (9.12 sq mi)
- Elevation: 80 m (260 ft)
- Highest elevation: 33 m (108 ft)
- Lowest elevation: 5 m (16 ft)
- Population (2023): 2,332
  - Density: 98.73/km^{2} (255.7/sq mi)
- Time zone: UTC+01:00 (CET)
  - Summer (DST): UTC+02:00 (CEST)
- INSEE/Postal code: 33125 /33250
- ^{1} French Land Register data, which excludes lakes, ponds, glaciers > 1 km^{2} (0.386 sq mi or 247 acres) and river estuaries.

Cissac-Médoc (French pronunciation: [sisak medɔk]) is a commune in the Gironde department in Nouvelle-Aquitaine in southwestern France.

== Population ==
Historical population
Year	Pop.	±% p.a.
1968	882	—
1975	941	+0.93%
1982	1,251	+4.15%
1990	1,472	+2.05%
1999	1,536	+0.47%
2007	1,732	+1.51%
2012	1,854	+1.37%
2017	2,146	+2.97%
2023	2,332	+1.39%
Source: INSEE

== See also ==
- Château Puy Castéra
- Communes of the Gironde department
- Château Cissac
