= Jau-Dignac-et-Loirac =

- Commune
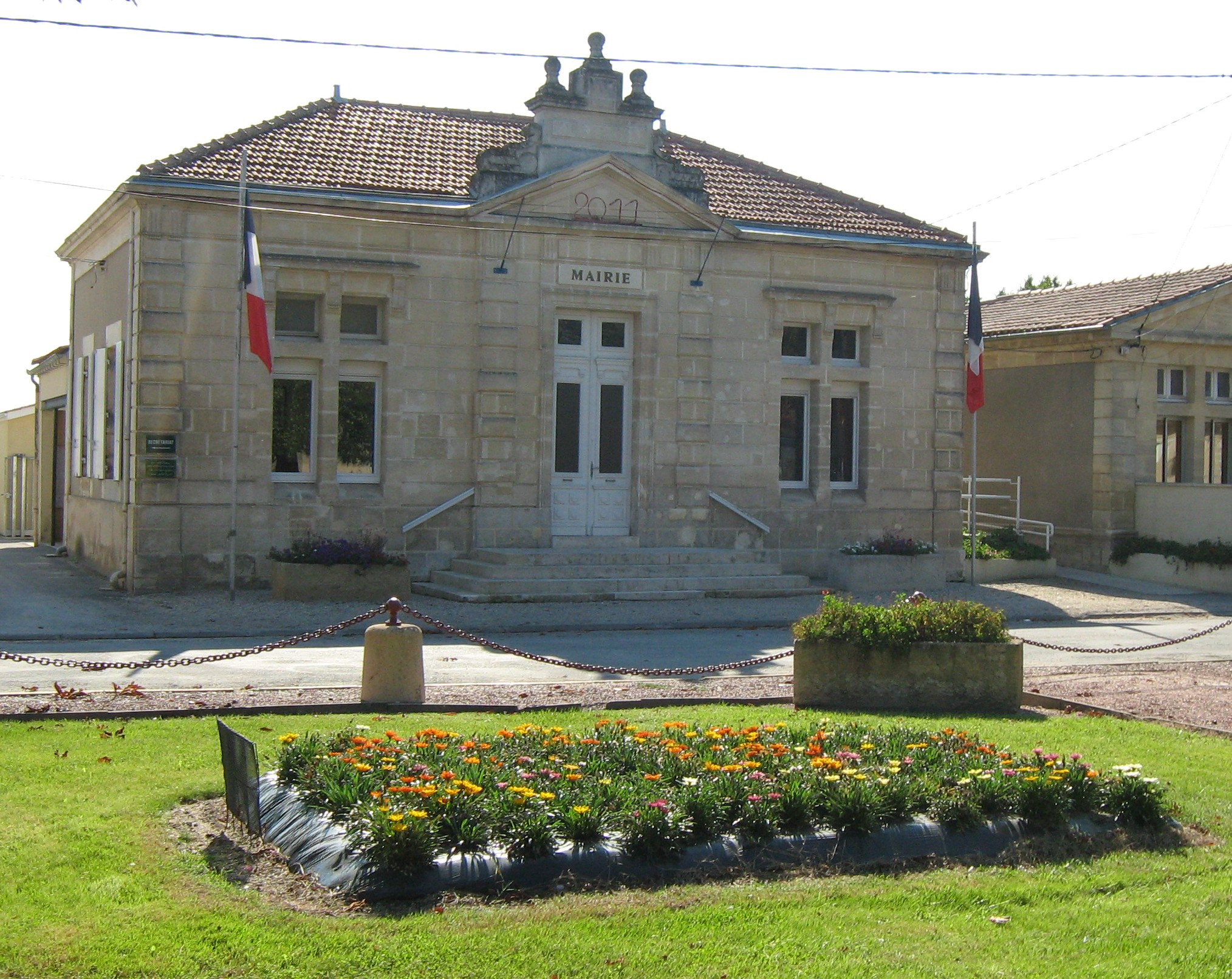
- The town hall in Jau-Dignac-et-Loirac

- Coat of arms
- Location of Jau-Dignac-et-Loirac
- Location within France Location within Nouvelle-Aquitaine
- Coordinates: 45°24′32″N 0°57′24″W
- Country: France
- Region: Nouvelle-Aquitaine
- Department: Gironde
- Arrondissement: Lesparre-Médoc
- Canton: Le Nord-Médoc

Government
  - Mayor (2020–2026): Christian Boura
- Area^{1}: 41.23 km^{2} (15.92 sq mi)
- Elevation: 5 m (16 ft)
- Highest elevation: 14 m (46 ft)
- Lowest elevation: 0 m (0 ft)
- Population (2023): 1,007
  - Density: 24.42/km^{2} (63.26/sq mi)
- Time zone: UTC+01:00 (CET)
  - Summer (DST): UTC+02:00 (CEST)
- INSEE/Postal code: 33208 /33590
- ^{1} French Land Register data, which excludes lakes, ponds, glaciers > 1 km^{2} (0.386 sq mi or 247 acres) and river estuaries.

Jau-Dignac-et-Loirac (French pronunciation: [ʒo diɲak e lwaʁak]; Occitan: Jau, Dinhac e Hloirac) is a commune in the Gironde department in Nouvelle-Aquitaine in southwestern France.

== Population ==
Historical population
Year	Pop.	±% p.a.
1968	909	—
1975	808	−1.67%
1982	803	−0.09%
1990	836	+0.50%
1999	866	+0.39%
2007	994	+1.74%
2012	1,023	+0.58%
2017	973	−1.00%
2023	1,007	+0.57%
Source: INSEE

== See also ==
- Communes of the Gironde department
- Château Saint-Aubin
