= Vertheuil =

- Commune
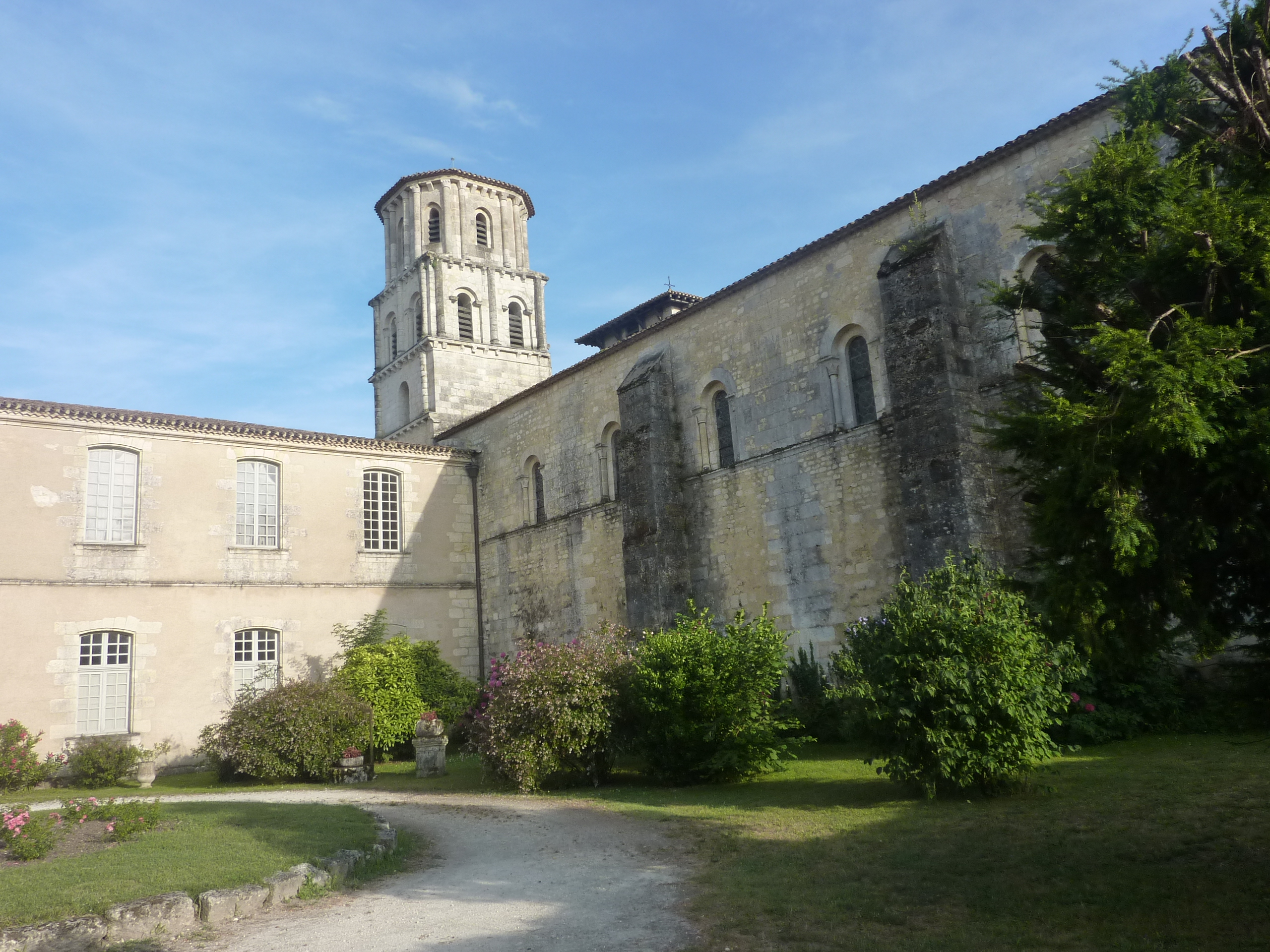
- Abbey of Saint-Pierre

- Coat of arms
- Location of Vertheuil
- Location within France Location within Nouvelle-Aquitaine
- Coordinates: 45°15′04″N 0°49′59″W
- Country: France
- Region: Nouvelle-Aquitaine
- Department: Gironde
- Arrondissement: Lesparre-Médoc
- Canton: Le Nord-Médoc
- Intercommunality: Médoc Cœur de Presqu'île

Government
  - Mayor (2020–2026): Dominique Turon
- Area^{1}: 21.94 km^{2} (8.47 sq mi)
- Elevation: 12 m (39 ft)
- Highest elevation: 35 m (115 ft)
- Lowest elevation: 5 m (16 ft)
- Population (2023): 1,339
  - Density: 61.03/km^{2} (158.1/sq mi)
- Time zone: UTC+01:00 (CET)
  - Summer (DST): UTC+02:00 (CEST)
- INSEE/Postal code: 33545 /33180
- ^{1} French Land Register data, which excludes lakes, ponds, glaciers > 1 km^{2} (0.386 sq mi or 247 acres) and river estuaries.

Vertheuil (French pronunciation: [vɛʁtœj]; Occitan: Vertulh) is a commune in the Gironde department, Nouvelle-Aquitaine, in southwestern France.

== Population ==
Historical population
Year	Pop.	±% p.a.
1968	765	—
1975	753	−0.23%
1982	910	+2.74%
1990	1,075	+2.10%
1999	1,068	−0.07%
2007	1,161	+1.05%
2012	1,251	+1.50%
2017	1,286	+0.55%
2023	1,339	+0.68%
Source: INSEE

== Notable people ==
- Henri Calloc'h de Kérillis (1889–1958), aviator, reporter, writer and politician
- Daniel Tinayre (1910-1994), Argentine filmmaker

== See also ==
- Communes of the Gironde department
