= Soulac-sur-Mer =

Soulac-sur-Mer Solac de Mar (Occitan)
- Commune
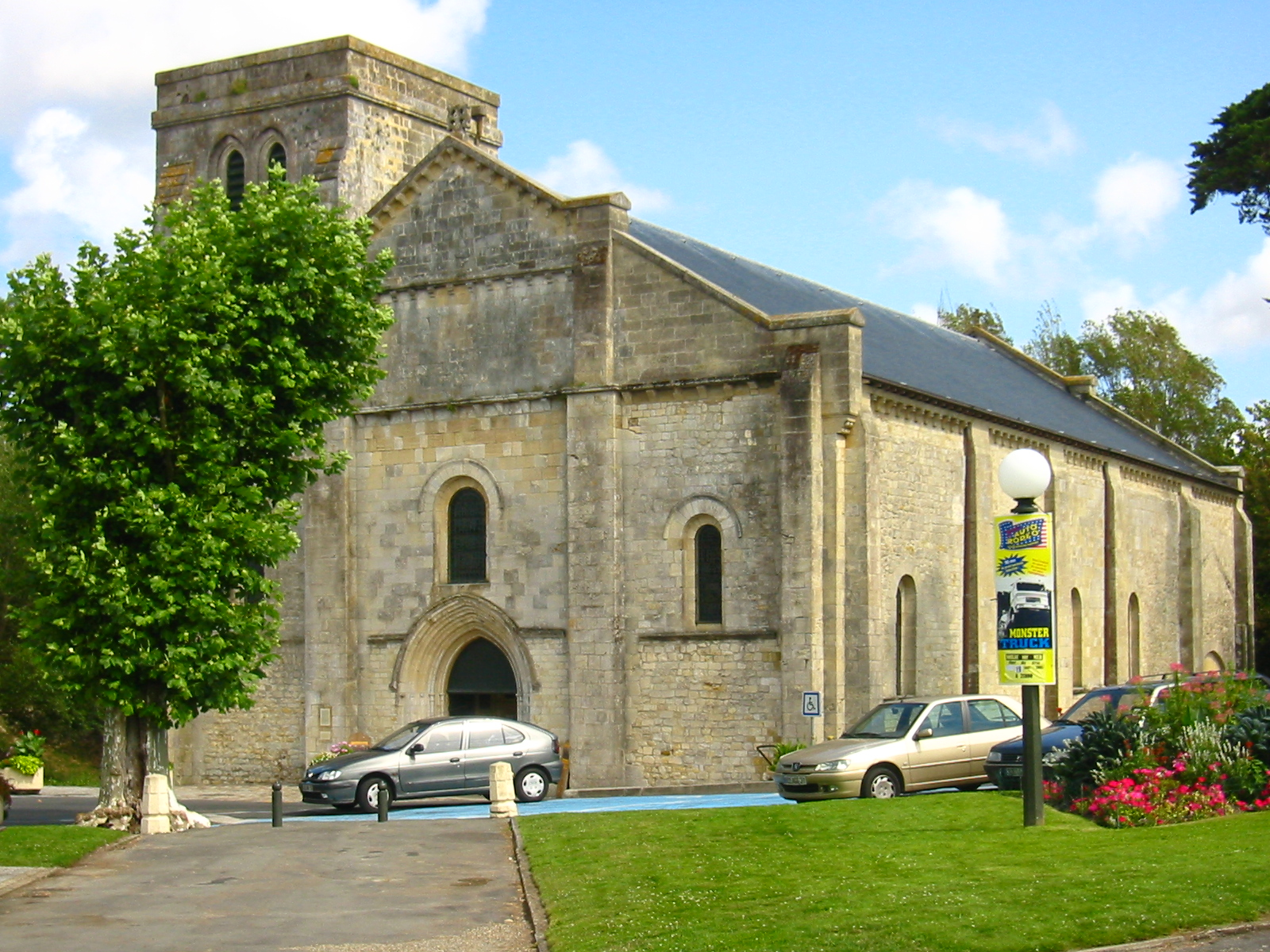
- Notre-Dame-de-la-Fin-des-Terres Basilica, a UNESCO World Heritage Site since 1998

- Coat of arms
- Location of Soulac-sur-Mer
- Location within France Location within Nouvelle-Aquitaine
- Coordinates: 45°30′43″N 1°07′25″W
- Country: France
- Region: Nouvelle-Aquitaine
- Department: Gironde
- Arrondissement: Lesparre-Médoc
- Canton: Le Nord-Médoc
- Intercommunality: CC Médoc Atlantique

Government
  - Mayor (2020–2026): Xavier Pintat (LR)
- Area^{1}: 28.89 km^{2} (11.15 sq mi)
- Elevation: 12 m (39 ft)
- Highest elevation: 25 m (82 ft)
- Lowest elevation: 0 m (0 ft)
- Population (2023): 3,100
  - Density: 110/km^{2} (280/sq mi)
- Demonym(s): Soulacais, Soulacaise (French)
- Time zone: UTC+01:00 (CET)
  - Summer (DST): UTC+02:00 (CEST)
- INSEE/Postal code: 33514 /33780
- Website: www.mairie-soulac.fr
- ^{1} French Land Register data, which excludes lakes, ponds, glaciers > 1 km^{2} (0.386 sq mi or 247 acres) and river estuaries.

Soulac-sur-Mer (French pronunciation: [sulak syʁ mɛʁ]; lit. 'Soulac-on-Sea'; Occitan: Solac de Mar, [suˈlak de ˈmaɾ]), commonly known as Soulac (Solac), is a commune in the department of Gironde, administrative region of Nouvelle-Aquitaine (formerly Aquitaine), France. It is a seaside resort on the Côte d'Argent, on the peninsula of the Médoc, 12 km from Royan and 86 km from Bordeaux.

== History ==
The history of the town remains relatively unknown before the medieval period. The town was for a time known as Noviomagus, mentioned by Ptolemy in his work Geography as being one of the two parts of a city held by the Bituriges Vivisques tribe, but this theory remains controversial in modern times. The territory of the town has been inhabited since the Neolithic period and through the Bronze Age, as shown by several archaeological discoveries. At the time, the configuration of the coasts differed. Soulac, today by the sea, was then located on the banks of the river. The town was at the end of an ancient route known as the Levade (or Lébade).

== Population ==
Historical population

Year	Pop.	±% p.a.
1793	742	—
1800	673	−1.38%
1806	651	−0.55%
1821	656	+0.05%
1831	801	+2.02%
1836	768	−0.84%
1841	814	+1.17%
1846	840	+0.63%
1851	950	+2.49%
1856	1,101	+2.99%
1861	1,165	+1.14%
1866	1,315	+2.45%
1872	1,185	−1.72%
1876	716	−11.83%
1881	720	+0.11%
1886	813	+2.46%
1891	993	+4.08%
1896	1,349	+6.32%
1901	1,388	+0.57%

Year	Pop.	±% p.a.
1906	1,601	+2.90%
1911	1,650	+0.60%
1921	1,672	+0.13%
1926	1,586	−1.05%
1931	2,043	+5.19%
1936	2,009	−0.34%
1946	1,883	−0.65%
1954	2,097	+1.35%
1962	2,113	+0.10%
1968	2,198	+0.66%
1975	2,387	+1.19%
1982	2,536	+0.87%
1990	2,790	+1.20%
1999	2,720	−0.28%
2007	2,679	−0.19%
2012	2,531	−1.13%
2017	2,811	+2.12%
2023	3,100	+1.64%

Source: EHESS and INSEE (1968-2023)

== Twin towns – sister cities ==
Soulac is twinned with:

- Saarburg, Germany (1972)
- Ospedaletti, Liguria, Italy (1972)
- Burgo de Osma-Ciudad de Osma, Castile and León, Spain (1988)
- (Republic of Ireland) Castlerea, Connacht, Ireland (1990)

== See also ==
- Communes of Gironde
