= Arrondissement of Lesparre-Médoc =

Coordinates: 45.30°N 0.93°W

Lesparre-Médoc
- Arrondissement
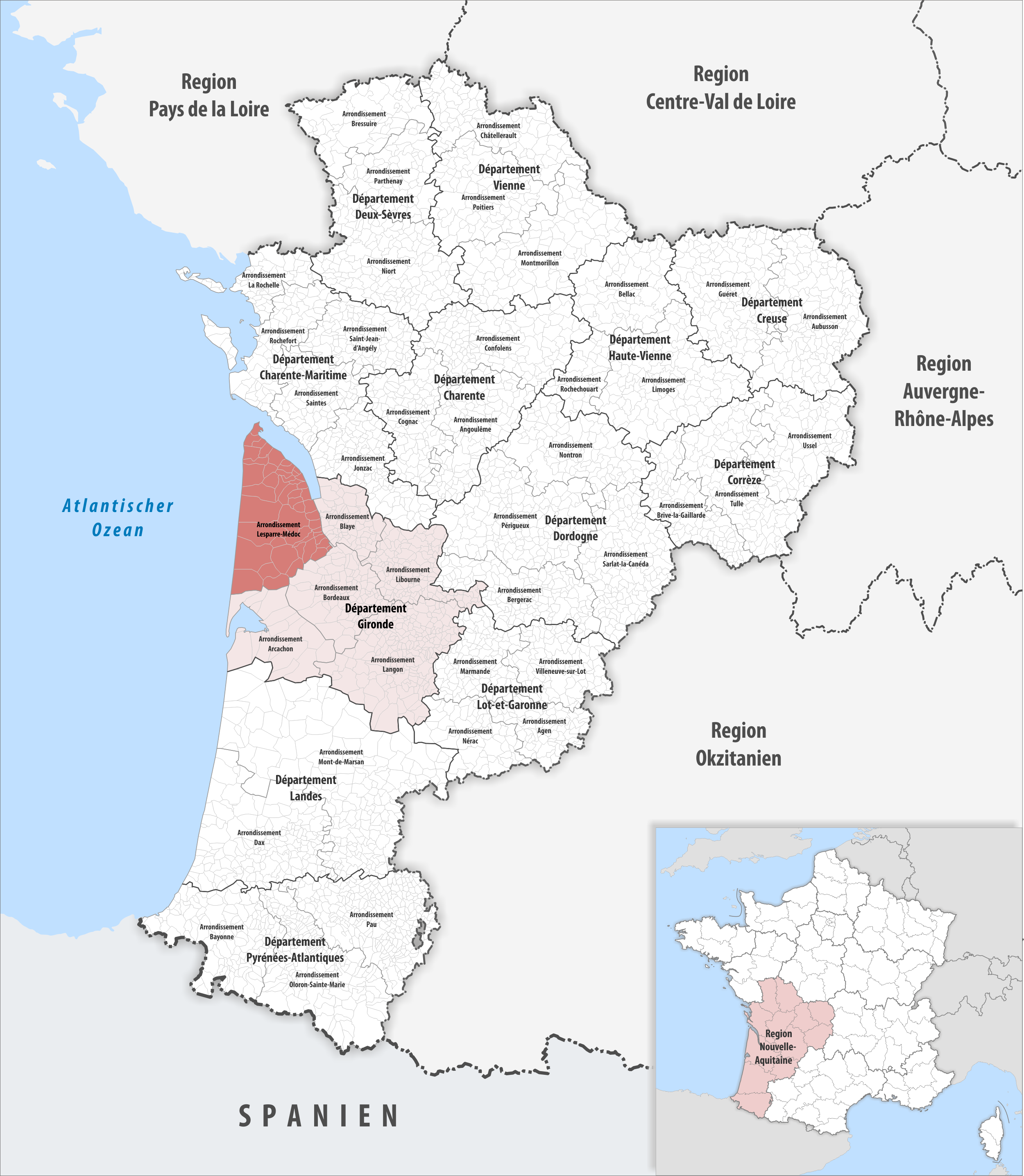
- Location within the region Nouvelle-Aquitaine
- Country: France
- Region: Nouvelle-Aquitaine
- Department: Gironde
- No. of communes: {{{nbcomm}}}
- Area: 2,274.4 km^{2} (878.2 sq mi)
- Population (2023): 96,078
  - Density: 42.243/km^{2} (109.41/sq mi)
- INSEE code: 334

The arrondissement of Lesparre-Médoc is an arrondissement of France in the Gironde department in the Nouvelle-Aquitaine region. It has 49 communes. Its population is 93,807 (2021), and its area is 2,274.4 km^{2} (878.2 sq mi).

== Composition ==
The communes of the arrondissement of Lesparre-Médoc, and their INSEE codes, are:

- Arcins (33010)
- Arsac (33012)
- Avensan (33022)
- Bégadan (33038)
- Blaignan-Prignac (33055)
- Brach (33070)
- Carcans (33097)
- Castelnau-de-Médoc (33104)
- Cissac-Médoc (33125)
- Civrac-en-Médoc (33128)
- Couquèques (33134)
- Cussac-Fort-Médoc (33146)
- Gaillan-en-Médoc (33177)
- Grayan-et-l'Hôpital (33193)
- Hourtin (33203)
- Jau-Dignac-et-Loirac (33208)
- Labarde (33211)
- Lacanau (33214)
- Lamarque (33220)
- Lesparre-Médoc (33240)
- Listrac-Médoc (33248)
- Margaux-Cantenac (33268)
- Moulis-en-Médoc (33297)
- Naujac-sur-Mer (33300)
- Ordonnac (33309)
- Pauillac (33314)
- Le Porge (33333)
- Queyrac (33348)
- Saint-Christoly-Médoc (33383)
- Saint-Estèphe (33395)
- Saint-Germain-d'Esteuil (33412)
- Saint-Julien-Beychevelle (33423)
- Saint-Laurent-Médoc (33424)
- Saint-Sauveur (33471)
- Saint-Seurin-de-Cadourne (33476)
- Saint-Vivien-de-Médoc (33490)
- Saint-Yzans-de-Médoc (33493)
- Sainte-Hélène (33417)
- Salaunes (33494)
- Saumos (33503)
- Soulac-sur-Mer (33514)
- Soussans (33517)
- Talais (33521)
- Le Temple (33528)
- Valeyrac (33538)
- Vendays-Montalivet (33540)
- Vensac (33541)
- Le Verdon-sur-Mer (33544)
- Vertheuil (33545)

== History ==
The arrondissement of Lesparre-Médoc was created in 1800, disbanded in 1926 and restored in 1942. At the May 2006 reorganisation of the arrondissements of Gironde, it gained the canton of Castelnau-de-Médoc from the arrondissement of Bordeaux.

As a result of the reorganisation of the cantons of France which came into effect in 2015, the borders of the cantons are no longer related to the borders of the arrondissements. The cantons of the arrondissement of Lesparre-Médoc were, as of January 2015:

- Castelnau-de-Médoc
- Lesparre-Médoc
- Pauillac
- Saint-Laurent-Médoc
- Saint-Vivien-de-Médoc

== Sub-prefects ==
- 1804-1814 : Jean-Baptiste Cavaignac de Lalande
- 1819-1830 : Jean-Baptiste Cavaignac de Lalande
