= Valeyrac =

- Commune
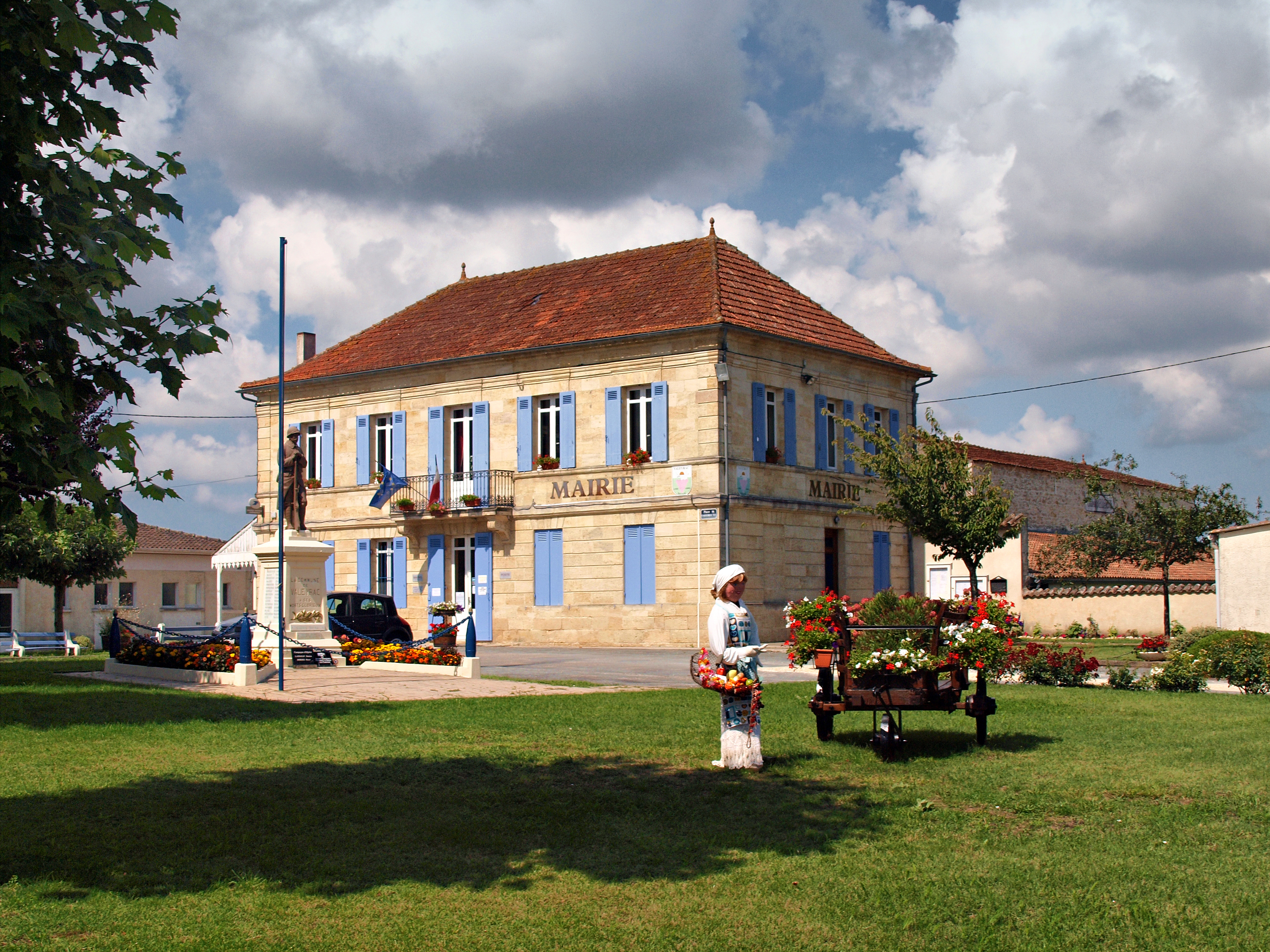
- The town hall in Valeyrac
- Location of Valeyrac
- Location within France Location within Nouvelle-Aquitaine
- Coordinates: 45°23′46″N 0°53′39″W
- Country: France
- Region: Nouvelle-Aquitaine
- Department: Gironde
- Arrondissement: Lesparre-Médoc
- Canton: Le Nord-Médoc

Government
  - Mayor (2020–2026): Jean-Louis Breton
- Area^{1}: 13.49 km^{2} (5.21 sq mi)
- Elevation: 13 m (43 ft)
- Highest elevation: 18 m (59 ft)
- Lowest elevation: 0 m (0 ft)
- Population (2023): 552
  - Density: 40.9/km^{2} (106/sq mi)
- Time zone: UTC+01:00 (CET)
  - Summer (DST): UTC+02:00 (CEST)
- INSEE/Postal code: 33538 /33340
- ^{1} French Land Register data, which excludes lakes, ponds, glaciers > 1 km^{2} (0.386 sq mi or 247 acres) and river estuaries.

Valeyrac (French pronunciation: [valɛjʁak]; Occitan: Valeirac) is a commune in the Gironde department in Nouvelle-Aquitaine in southwestern France.

== Population ==
Historical population
Year	Pop.	±% p.a.
1968	462	—
1975	409	−1.73%
1982	370	−1.42%
1990	392	+0.72%
1999	417	+0.69%
2007	449	+0.93%
2012	529	+3.33%
2017	548	+0.71%
2023	552	+0.12%
Source: INSEE

== See also ==
- Communes of the Gironde department
