= Château Puy Castéra =

Coordinates: 45°13′38″N 0°48′05″W

Château Puy Castéra is a wine producer located in the commune of Cissac-Médoc in the Bordeaux region of France.

== History ==
The name of the estate comes from two words of old French and Latin: Puy (mound) and Castéra (camp, fortress).

Since 1973, birth of the Estate, Henri Marès and his children have worked with the well-known oenologists Peynaud and Boissenot. In 1978, Château Puy Castéra received the Cru Bourgeois classification.

== Production ==
Appellation: Médoc
Production: 120 000 bottles
Area: 28 hectares (69 acres)
Grape varieties : 57% of Cabernet Sauvignon, 30% of Merlot, 10% of Cabernet Franc, 2% of Malbec, 1% of Petit Verdot
