= Saint-Vivien-de-Médoc =

Saint-Vivien-de-Médoc Sent Bebian de Medòc (Occitan)
- Commune
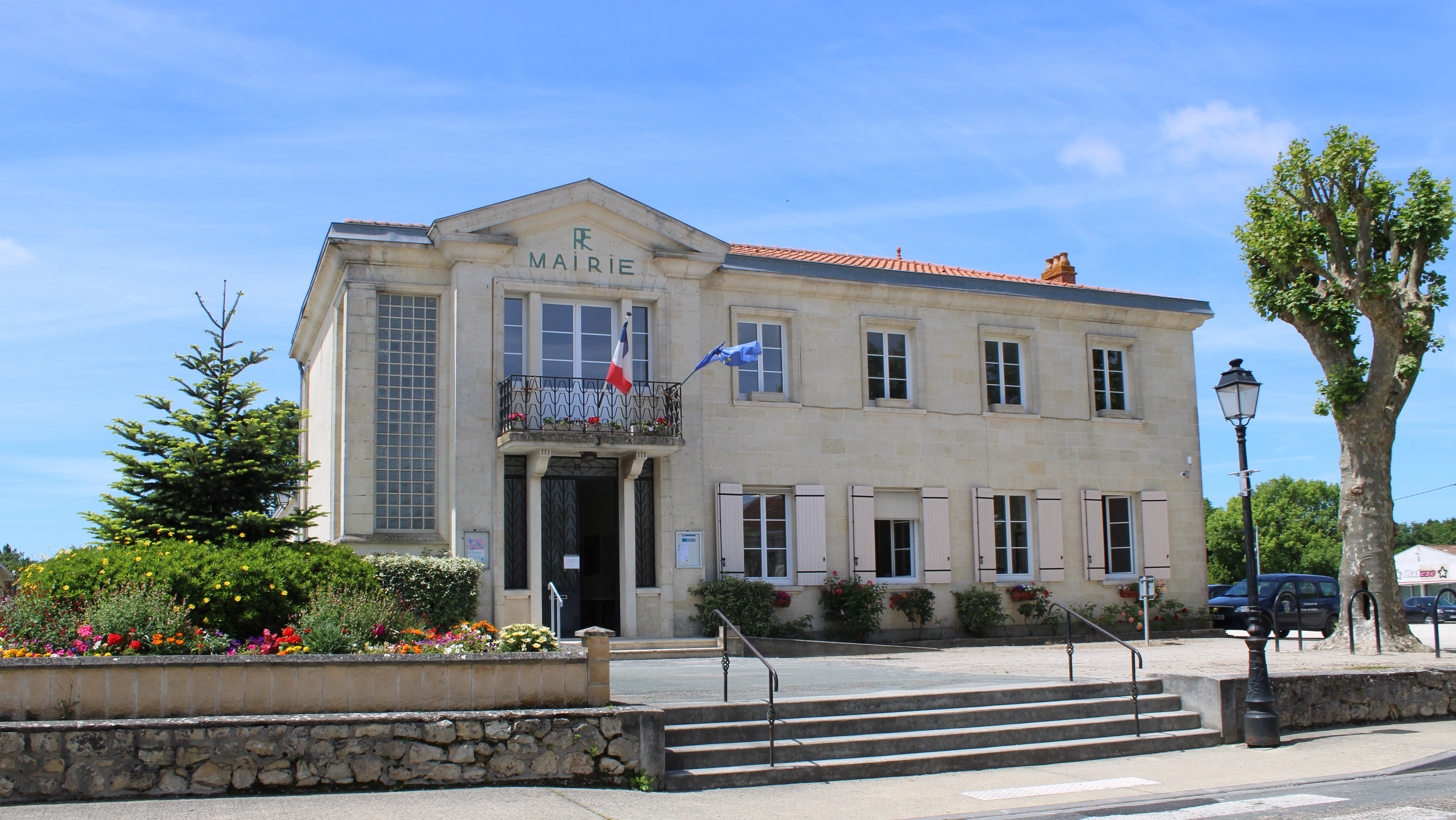
- The town hall in Saint-Vivien-de-Médoc

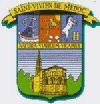
- Coat of arms
- Location of Saint-Vivien-de-Médoc
- Location within France Location within Nouvelle-Aquitaine
- Coordinates: 45°25′52″N 1°02′04″W
- Country: France
- Region: Nouvelle-Aquitaine
- Department: Gironde
- Arrondissement: Lesparre-Médoc
- Canton: Le Nord-Médoc
- Intercommunality: CC Médoc Atlantique

Government
  - Mayor (2020–2026): Jean-Pierre Dubernet
- Area^{1}: 29.4 km^{2} (11.4 sq mi)
- Elevation: 11 m (36 ft)
- Highest elevation: 12 m (39 ft)
- Lowest elevation: 0 m (0 ft)
- Population (2023): 1,846
  - Density: 62.8/km^{2} (163/sq mi)
- Demonym: Viviennais
- Time zone: UTC+01:00 (CET)
  - Summer (DST): UTC+02:00 (CEST)
- INSEE/Postal code: 33490 /33590
- Website: www.stviviendemedoc.fr
- ^{1} French Land Register data, which excludes lakes, ponds, glaciers > 1 km^{2} (0.386 sq mi or 247 acres) and river estuaries.

Saint-Vivien-de-Médoc (French pronunciation: [sɛ̃ vivjɛ̃ d(ə) medɔk]; lit. 'St Vivien of Médoc'; Occitan: Sent Bebian de Medòc), or simply Saint-Vivien, is a rural commune in the Gironde department in Nouvelle-Aquitaine in southwestern France. It is on the Gironde estuary.

It is located approximately 75 km (47 mi) northwest of Bordeaux. It was the site of an important action in Operation Frankton in December 1942.

== Population ==
Historical population
Year	Pop.	±% p.a.
1968	1,018	—
1975	1,096	+1.06%
1982	1,161	+0.83%
1990	1,282	+1.25%
1999	1,365	+0.70%
2007	1,497	+1.16%
2012	1,672	+2.24%
2017	1,777	+1.23%
2023	1,846	+0.64%
Source: INSEE

== See also ==
- Communes of the Gironde department
