= Canton of Le Nord-Médoc =

Coordinates: 45.31°N 0.94°W

The canton of Le Nord-Médoc is an administrative division of the Gironde department, southwestern France. It was created at the French canton reorganisation which came into effect in March 2015. Its seat is in Lesparre-Médoc.

It consists of the following communes:

1. Bégadan
2. Blaignan-Prignac
3. Cissac-Médoc
4. Civrac-en-Médoc
5. Couquèques
6. Gaillan-en-Médoc
7. Grayan-et-l'Hôpital
8. Jau-Dignac-et-Loirac
9. Lesparre-Médoc
10. Naujac-sur-Mer
11. Ordonnac
12. Pauillac
13. Queyrac
14. Saint-Christoly-Médoc
15. Saint-Estèphe
16. Saint-Germain-d'Esteuil
17. Saint-Julien-Beychevelle
18. Saint-Sauveur
19. Saint-Seurin-de-Cadourne
20. Saint-Vivien-de-Médoc
21. Saint-Yzans-de-Médoc
22. Soulac-sur-Mer
23. Talais
24. Valeyrac
25. Vendays-Montalivet
26. Vensac
27. Le Verdon-sur-Mer
28. Vertheuil
