= Saint-Christoly-Médoc =

- Commune
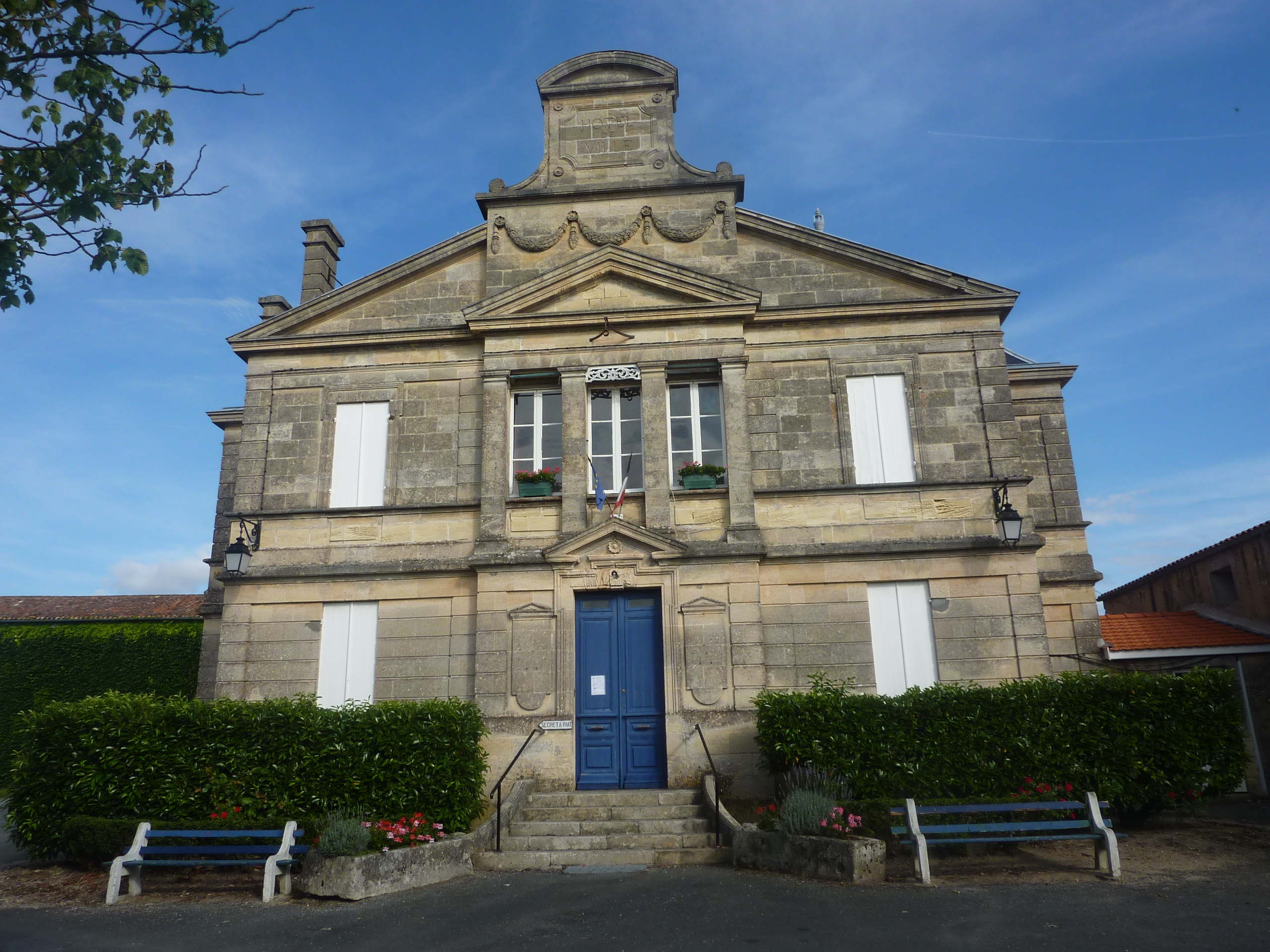
- Town hall
- Location of Saint-Christoly-Médoc
- Location within France Location within Nouvelle-Aquitaine
- Coordinates: 45°21′25″N 0°49′28″W
- Country: France
- Region: Nouvelle-Aquitaine
- Department: Gironde
- Arrondissement: Lesparre-Médoc
- Canton: Le Nord-Médoc

Government
  - Mayor (2020–2026): Stéphane Poineau
- Area^{1}: 7.55 km^{2} (2.92 sq mi)
- Elevation: 6 m (20 ft)
- Highest elevation: 16 m (52 ft)
- Lowest elevation: 1 m (3.3 ft)
- Population (2023): 297
  - Density: 39.3/km^{2} (102/sq mi)
- Time zone: UTC+01:00 (CET)
  - Summer (DST): UTC+02:00 (CEST)
- INSEE/Postal code: 33383 /33340
- ^{1} French Land Register data, which excludes lakes, ponds, glaciers > 1 km^{2} (0.386 sq mi or 247 acres) and river estuaries.

Saint-Christoly-Médoc (French pronunciation: [sɛ̃ kʁistɔli medɔk], also known as Saint-Christoly-de-Médoc; Occitan: Sent Cristòli Mèdoc) is a commune in the Gironde department in Nouvelle-Aquitaine in southwestern France.

== Population ==
Historical population
Year	Pop.	±% p.a.
1968	385	—
1975	378	−0.26%
1982	381	+0.11%
1990	337	−1.52%
1999	323	−0.47%
2007	295	−1.13%
2012	285	−0.69%
2017	283	−0.14%
2023	297	+0.81%
Source: INSEE

== See also ==
- Communes of the Gironde department
