= Saint-Seurin-de-Cadourne =

- Commune
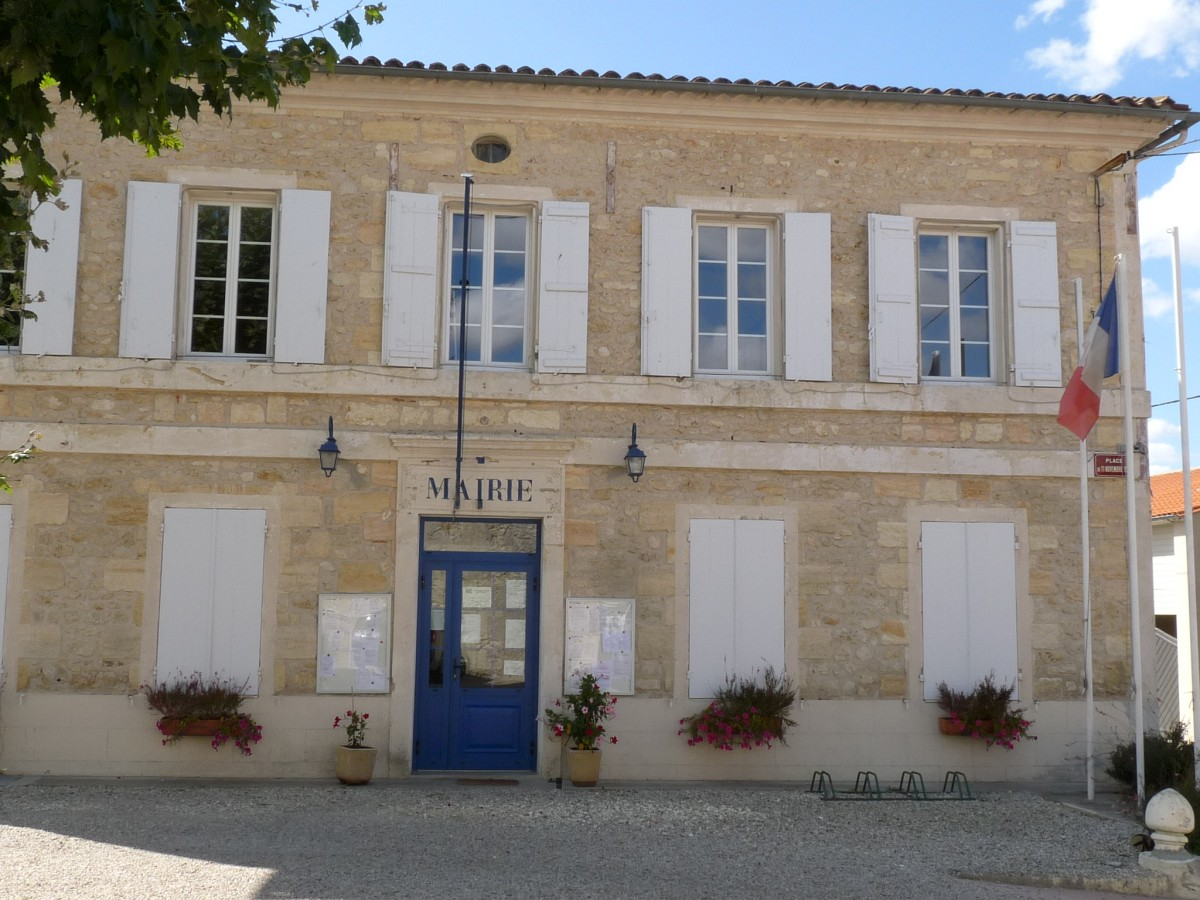
- Town hall
- Location of Saint-Seurin-de-Cadourne
- Location within France Location within Nouvelle-Aquitaine
- Coordinates: 45°17′14″N 0°47′16″W
- Country: France
- Region: Nouvelle-Aquitaine
- Department: Gironde
- Arrondissement: Lesparre-Médoc
- Canton: Le Nord-Médoc

Government
  - Mayor (2024–2026): Frédéric Larroque
- Area^{1}: 15.77 km^{2} (6.09 sq mi)
- Elevation: 22 m (72 ft)
- Highest elevation: 23 m (75 ft)
- Lowest elevation: 1 m (3.3 ft)
- Population (2023): 705
  - Density: 44.7/km^{2} (116/sq mi)
- Time zone: UTC+01:00 (CET)
  - Summer (DST): UTC+02:00 (CEST)
- INSEE/Postal code: 33476 /33180
- ^{1} French Land Register data, which excludes lakes, ponds, glaciers > 1 km^{2} (0.386 sq mi or 247 acres) and river estuaries.

Saint-Seurin-de-Cadourne (French pronunciation: [sɛ̃ sœʁɛ̃ də kaduʁn]; Gascon: Sent Seurin de Cadorna) is a commune in the Gironde department in Nouvelle-Aquitaine in southwestern France.

== Population ==
Historical population
Year	Pop.	±% p.a.
1968	634	—
1975	710	+1.63%
1982	753	+0.84%
1990	799	+0.74%
1999	767	−0.45%
2007	712	−0.93%
2012	712	+0.00%
2017	710	−0.06%
2023	705	−0.12%
Source: INSEE

== See also ==
- Communes of the Gironde department
