= Ordonnac =

- Commune
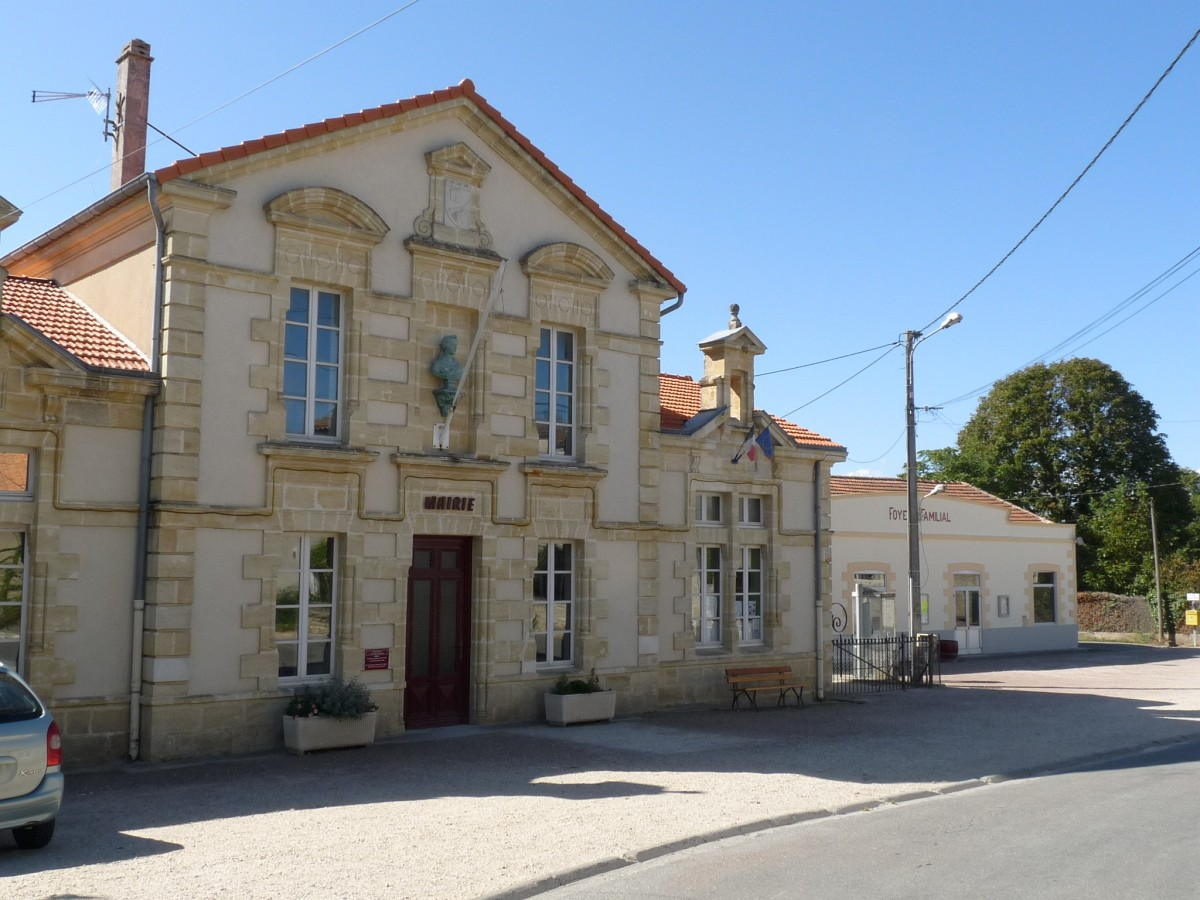
- The town hall in Ordonnac
- Location of Ordonnac
- Location within France Location within Nouvelle-Aquitaine
- Coordinates: 45°18′30″N 0°50′04″W
- Country: France
- Region: Nouvelle-Aquitaine
- Department: Gironde
- Arrondissement: Lesparre-Médoc
- Canton: Le Nord-Médoc
- Intercommunality: Médoc Cœur de Presqu'île

Government
  - Mayor (2021–2026): Stephane Korchef
- Area^{1}: 10.21 km^{2} (3.94 sq mi)
- Elevation: 15 m (49 ft)
- Highest elevation: 35 m (115 ft)
- Lowest elevation: 2 m (6.6 ft)
- Population (2023): 476
  - Density: 46.6/km^{2} (121/sq mi)
- Time zone: UTC+01:00 (CET)
  - Summer (DST): UTC+02:00 (CEST)
- INSEE/Postal code: 33309 /33340
- ^{1} French Land Register data, which excludes lakes, ponds, glaciers > 1 km^{2} (0.386 sq mi or 247 acres) and river estuaries.

Ordonnac (French pronunciation: [ɔʁdɔnak]; Occitan: Ordonac) is a commune in the Gironde department in Nouvelle-Aquitaine, southwestern France.

== Population ==
Historical population
Year	Pop.	±% p.a.
1968	354	—
1975	338	−0.66%
1982	385	+1.88%
1990	418	+1.03%
1999	406	−0.32%
2007	391	−0.47%
2012	479	+4.14%
2017	510	+1.26%
2023	476	−1.14%
Source: INSEE

== See also ==
- Communes of the Gironde department
