= Le Verdon-sur-Mer =

- Commune
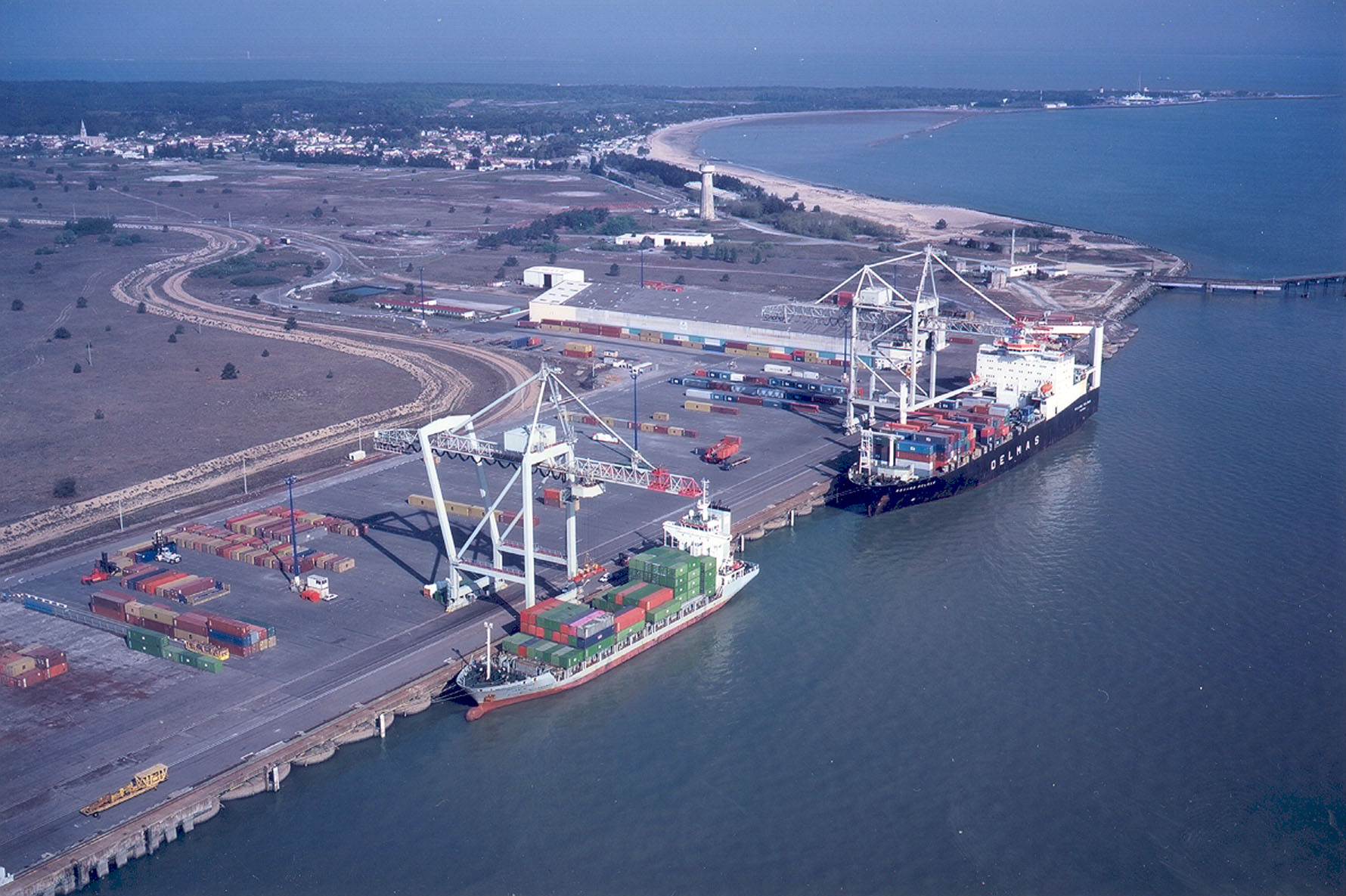
- Container ships

- Coat of arms
- Location of Le Verdon-sur-Mer
- Location within France Location within Nouvelle-Aquitaine
- Coordinates: 45°32′50″N 1°03′38″W
- Country: France
- Region: Nouvelle-Aquitaine
- Department: Gironde
- Arrondissement: Lesparre-Médoc
- Canton: Le Nord-Médoc

Government
  - Mayor (2020–2026): Jacques Bidalun
- Area^{1}: 17.09 km^{2} (6.60 sq mi)
- Elevation: 6 m (20 ft)
- Highest elevation: 36 m (118 ft)
- Lowest elevation: 0 m (0 ft)
- Population (2023): 1,408
  - Density: 82.39/km^{2} (213.4/sq mi)
- Time zone: UTC+01:00 (CET)
  - Summer (DST): UTC+02:00 (CEST)
- INSEE/Postal code: 33544 /33123
- ^{1} French Land Register data, which excludes lakes, ponds, glaciers > 1 km^{2} (0.386 sq mi or 247 acres) and river estuaries.

Le Verdon-sur-Mer (French pronunciation: [lə vɛʁdɔ̃ syʁ mɛʁ], lit. 'Le Verdon on Sea'; Occitan: Lo Verdon sus la Mar) is a commune in the Gironde department in Nouvelle-Aquitaine in southwestern France.

== History ==
In the 11th century, the territory housed the priory of Saint-Nicholas de Grave, dependent on the Cluny order. It housed the monks in charge of maintaining the fire of Cordouan, off the mouth of the estuary. The priory has been buried under sand for an undefined period.

Until 1874, the town was dependent on the commune of Soulac. That year was also the year of construction on the Bordeaux-Le Verdon railway line which would open up the town and envisage a future port. The railway line started from Bordeaux in 1868 and did not reach the town until 1875, with the Point de Grave being reached in 1902.

Le Verdon was initially only a hamlet of Soulac which was a distance from Bourg, it had lived off salt production for a long period of time. The other main activities of the village are the exploitation of resources linked to the sea (fishing, oysters, shellfish, etc.) as well as subsistence farming.

From the Middle Ages, Le Verdon has been known for its harbor, which is sheltered from prevailing westerly winds. Ships that leave the Gironde estuary park at the harbor before setting sail.

== Population ==
Historical population
Year	Pop.	±% p.a.
1968	1,630	—
1975	1,648	+0.16%
1982	1,616	−0.28%
1990	1,344	−2.28%
1999	1,274	−0.59%
2007	1,369	+0.90%
2012	1,377	+0.12%
2017	1,335	−0.62%
2023	1,408	+0.89%
Source: INSEE

== See also ==
- Communes of the Gironde department
