= Vendays-Montalivet =

Vendays-Montalivet Vendais e Montalivet (Occitan)
- Commune
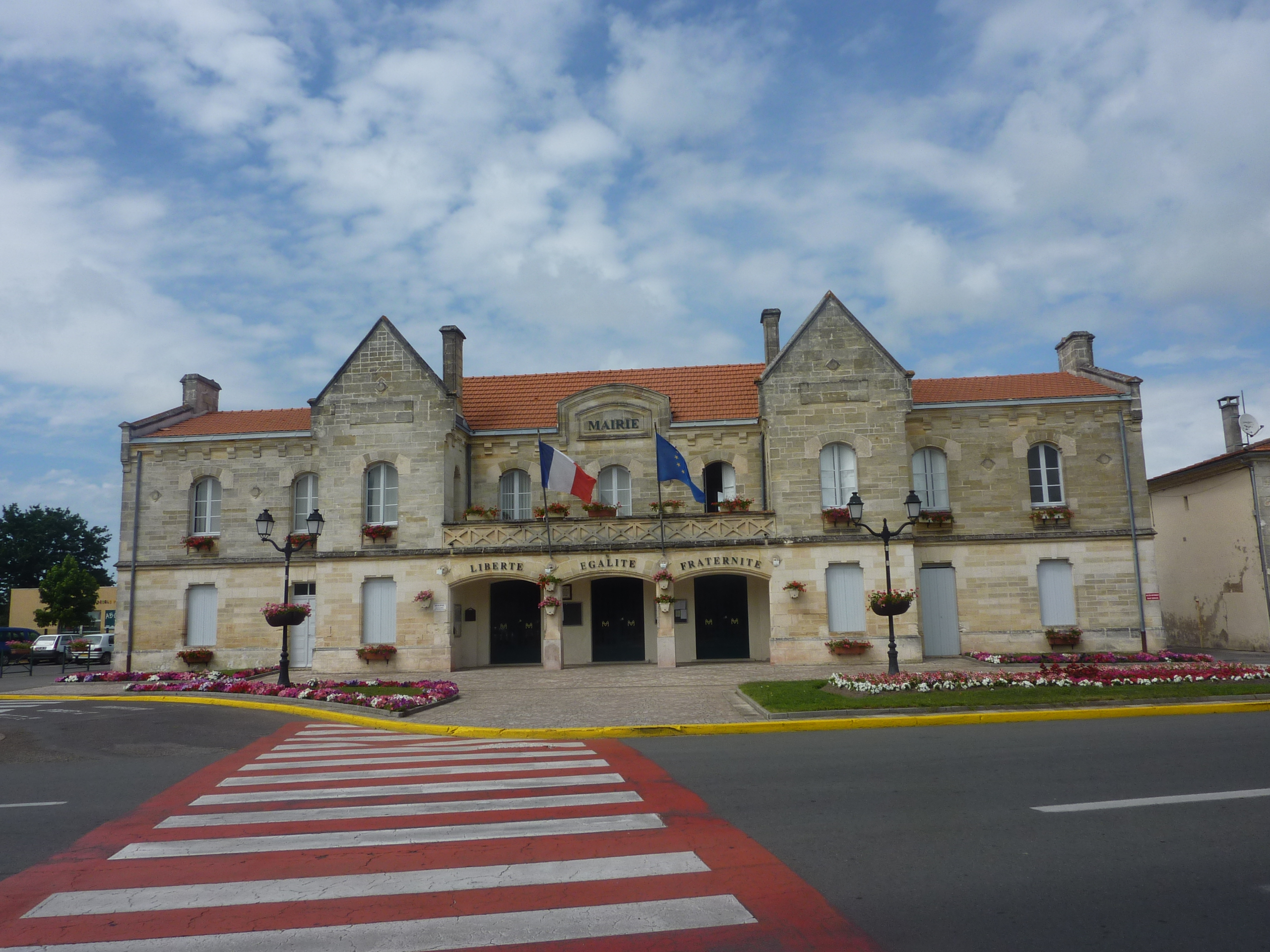
- Vendays-Montalivet Town Hall in Montalivet

- Coat of arms
- Location of Vendays-Montalivet
- Location within France Location within Nouvelle-Aquitaine
- Coordinates: 45°21′25″N 1°03′33″W
- Country: France
- Region: Nouvelle-Aquitaine
- Department: Gironde
- Arrondissement: Lesparre-Médoc
- Canton: Le Nord-Médoc

Government
  - Mayor (2020–2026): Pierre Bournel
- Area^{1}: 101.46 km^{2} (39.17 sq mi)
- Elevation: 6 m (20 ft)
- Highest elevation: 57 m (187 ft)
- Lowest elevation: 0 m (0 ft)
- Population (2023): 2,838
  - Density: 27.97/km^{2} (72.45/sq mi)
- Time zone: UTC+01:00 (CET)
  - Summer (DST): UTC+02:00 (CEST)
- INSEE/Postal code: 33540 /33930
- ^{1} French Land Register data, which excludes lakes, ponds, glaciers > 1 km^{2} (0.386 sq mi or 247 acres) and river estuaries.

Vendays-Montalivet (French pronunciation: [vɑ̃dajs mɔ̃talivɛ]; Occitan: Vendais e Montalivet) is a commune in the Gironde department in the Nouvelle-Aquitaine region in Southwestern France.

== Climate ==
Climate data for Vendays–Montalivet, Gironde, 1991–2020 normals, extremes 1984–present
Month	Jan	Feb	Mar	Apr	May	Jun	Jul	Aug	Sep	Oct	Nov	Dec	Year
Record high °C (°F)	19.7 (67.5)	24.6 (76.3)	28.6 (83.5)	32.2 (90.0)	34.7 (94.5)	42.4 (108.3)	40.1 (104.2)	41.9 (107.4)	36.4 (97.5)	30.1 (86.2)	25.0 (77.0)	21.1 (70.0)	42.4 (108.3)
Mean daily maximum °C (°F)	10.7 (51.3)	11.8 (53.2)	15.0 (59.0)	17.4 (63.3)	20.9 (69.6)	23.9 (75.0)	25.8 (78.4)	26.0 (78.8)	23.6 (74.5)	19.4 (66.9)	14.4 (57.9)	11.3 (52.3)	18.4 (65.0)
Daily mean °C (°F)	7.0 (44.6)	7.3 (45.1)	10.0 (50.0)	12.1 (53.8)	15.6 (60.1)	18.6 (65.5)	20.3 (68.5)	20.3 (68.5)	17.7 (63.9)	14.5 (58.1)	10.2 (50.4)	7.6 (45.7)	13.4 (56.2)
Mean daily minimum °C (°F)	3.4 (38.1)	2.9 (37.2)	5.0 (41.0)	6.9 (44.4)	10.4 (50.7)	13.4 (56.1)	14.9 (58.8)	14.6 (58.3)	11.8 (53.2)	9.6 (49.3)	6.1 (43.0)	3.9 (39.0)	8.6 (47.4)
Record low °C (°F)	−15.0 (5.0)	−10.2 (13.6)	−9.4 (15.1)	−5.8 (21.6)	−1.8 (28.8)	4.2 (39.6)	5.3 (41.5)	4.6 (40.3)	0.7 (33.3)	−4.8 (23.4)	−9.3 (15.3)	−9.6 (14.7)	−15.0 (5.0)
Average precipitation mm (inches)	83.4 (3.28)	56.1 (2.21)	54.1 (2.13)	62.6 (2.46)	57.9 (2.28)	58.4 (2.30)	39.7 (1.56)	47.9 (1.89)	69.6 (2.74)	86.7 (3.41)	113.4 (4.46)	96.6 (3.80)	826.4 (32.52)
Average precipitation days (≥ 1.0 mm)	12.7	10.1	10.0	10.1	8.7	7.6	7.0	6.8	8.3	11.3	14.3	13.9	120.8
Source: Meteociel

== Demographics ==
Historical population
Year	Pop.	±% p.a.
1968	1,630	—
1975	1,597	−0.29%
1982	1,636	+0.35%
1990	1,681	+0.34%
1999	1,827	+0.93%
2007	2,162	+2.13%
2012	2,487	+2.84%
2017	2,445	−0.34%
2023	2,838	+2.52%
Source: INSEE

== See also ==
- Communes of the Gironde department
