= Queyrac =

- Commune
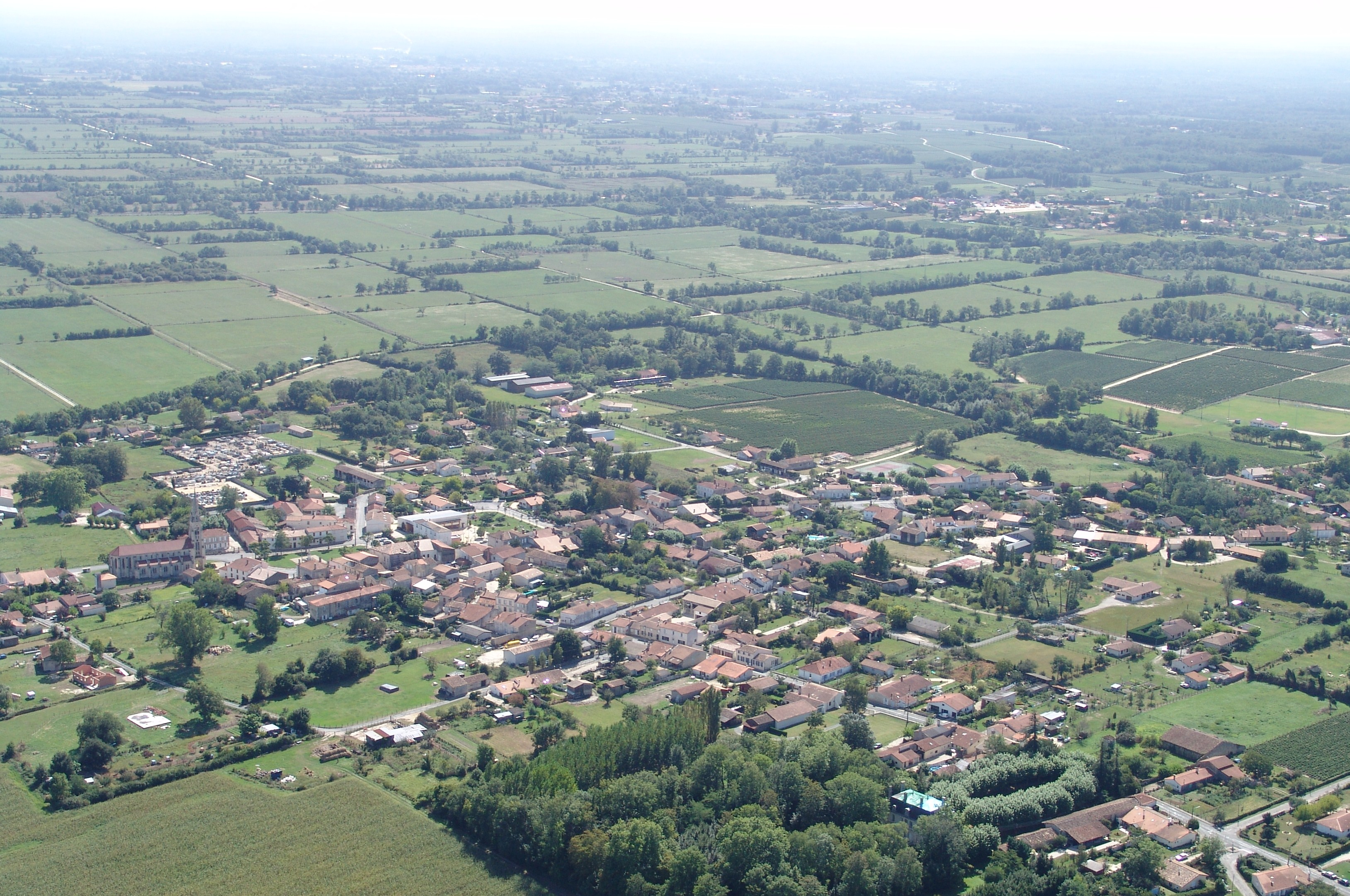
- An aerial view of Queyrac
- Location of Queyrac
- Location within France Location within Nouvelle-Aquitaine
- Coordinates: 45°21′47″N 0°58′37″W
- Country: France
- Region: Nouvelle-Aquitaine
- Department: Gironde
- Arrondissement: Lesparre-Médoc
- Canton: Le Nord-Médoc
- Intercommunality: Médoc Atlantique

Government
  - Mayor (2020–2026): Véronique Chambaud-Berran
- Area^{1}: 30.73 km^{2} (11.86 sq mi)
- Elevation: 8 m (26 ft)
- Highest elevation: 13 m (43 ft)
- Lowest elevation: 3 m (9.8 ft)
- Population (2023): 1,352
  - Density: 44.00/km^{2} (113.9/sq mi)
- Time zone: UTC+01:00 (CET)
  - Summer (DST): UTC+02:00 (CEST)
- INSEE/Postal code: 33348 /33340
- ^{1} French Land Register data, which excludes lakes, ponds, glaciers > 1 km^{2} (0.386 sq mi or 247 acres) and river estuaries.

Queyrac (French pronunciation: [kɛʁak]; Occitan: Cairac) is a commune in the Gironde department in Nouvelle-Aquitaine in southwestern France.

== Population ==
Historical population
Year	Pop.	±% p.a.
1968	1,099	—
1975	1,030	−0.92%
1982	1,127	+1.29%
1990	1,129	+0.02%
1999	1,164	+0.34%
2007	1,360	+1.96%
2012	1,384	+0.35%
2017	1,382	−0.03%
2023	1,352	−0.37%
Source: INSEE

== See also ==
- Communes of the Gironde department
