= Civrac-en-Médoc =

- Commune
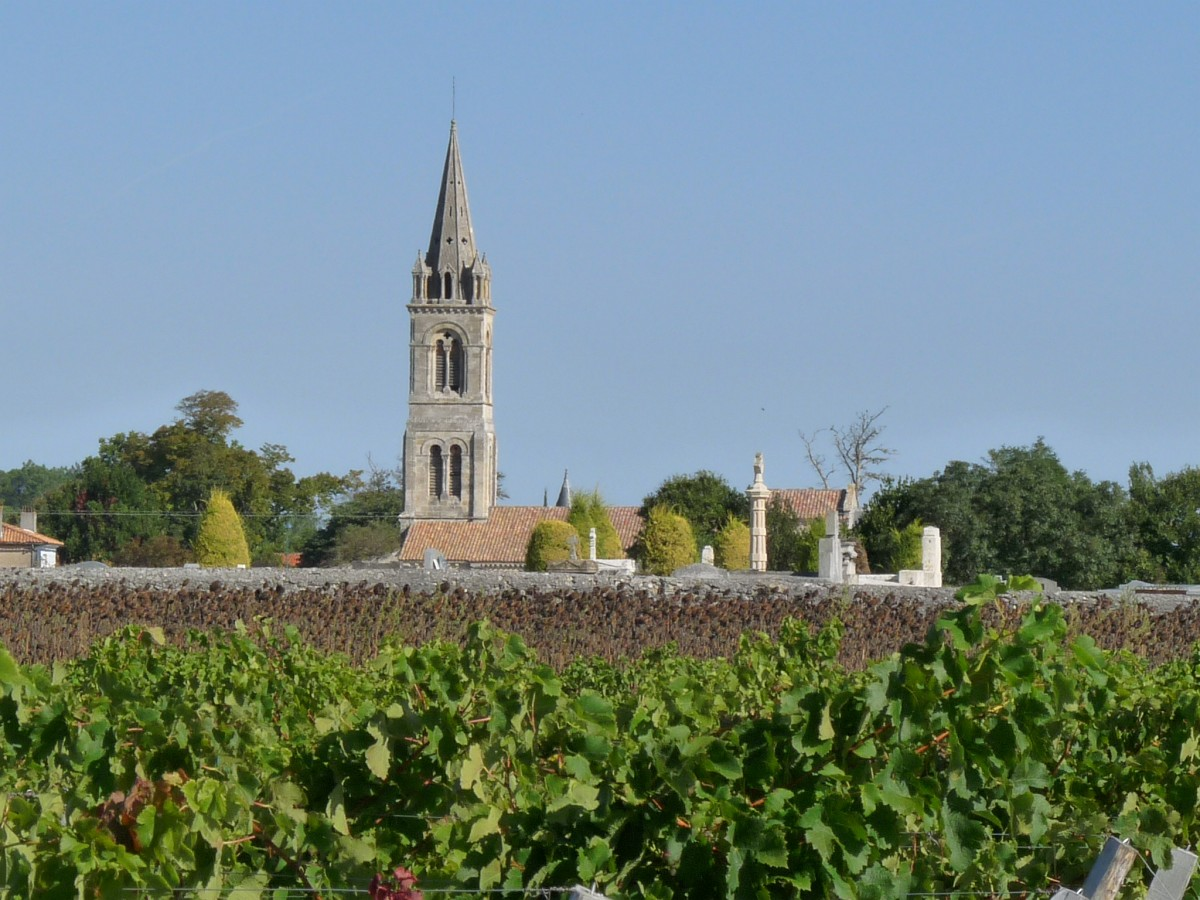
- The church in Civrac-en-Médoc

- Coat of arms
- Location of Civrac-en-Médoc
- Location within France Location within Nouvelle-Aquitaine
- Coordinates: 45°20′21″N 0°53′46″W
- Country: France
- Region: Nouvelle-Aquitaine
- Department: Gironde
- Arrondissement: Lesparre-Médoc
- Canton: Le Nord-Médoc

Government
  - Mayor (2020–2026): Béatrice Savin
- Area^{1}: 18.35 km^{2} (7.08 sq mi)
- Elevation: 15 m (49 ft)
- Highest elevation: 22 m (72 ft)
- Lowest elevation: 6 m (20 ft)
- Population (2023): 634
  - Density: 34.6/km^{2} (89.5/sq mi)
- Time zone: UTC+01:00 (CET)
  - Summer (DST): UTC+02:00 (CEST)
- INSEE/Postal code: 33128 /33340
- ^{1} French Land Register data, which excludes lakes, ponds, glaciers > 1 km^{2} (0.386 sq mi or 247 acres) and river estuaries.

Civrac-en-Médoc (French pronunciation: [sivʁak ɑ̃ medɔk], literally Civrac in Médoc; Gascon: Sivrac de Medòc) is a commune in the Gironde department in Nouvelle-Aquitaine in southwestern France.

== Population ==
Historical population
| Year | Pop. | ±% p.a. |
|---|---|---|
| 1968 | 427 | — |
| 1975 | 403 | −0.82% |
| 1982 | 451 | +1.62% |
| 1990 | 510 | +1.55% |
| 1999 | 502 | −0.18% |
| 2007 | 540 | +0.92% |
| 2012 | 609 | +2.43% |
| 2017 | 692 | +2.59% |
| 2023 | 634 | −1.45% |
Source: INSEE

== See also ==
- Communes of the Gironde department
