= Gaillan-en-Médoc =

- Commune
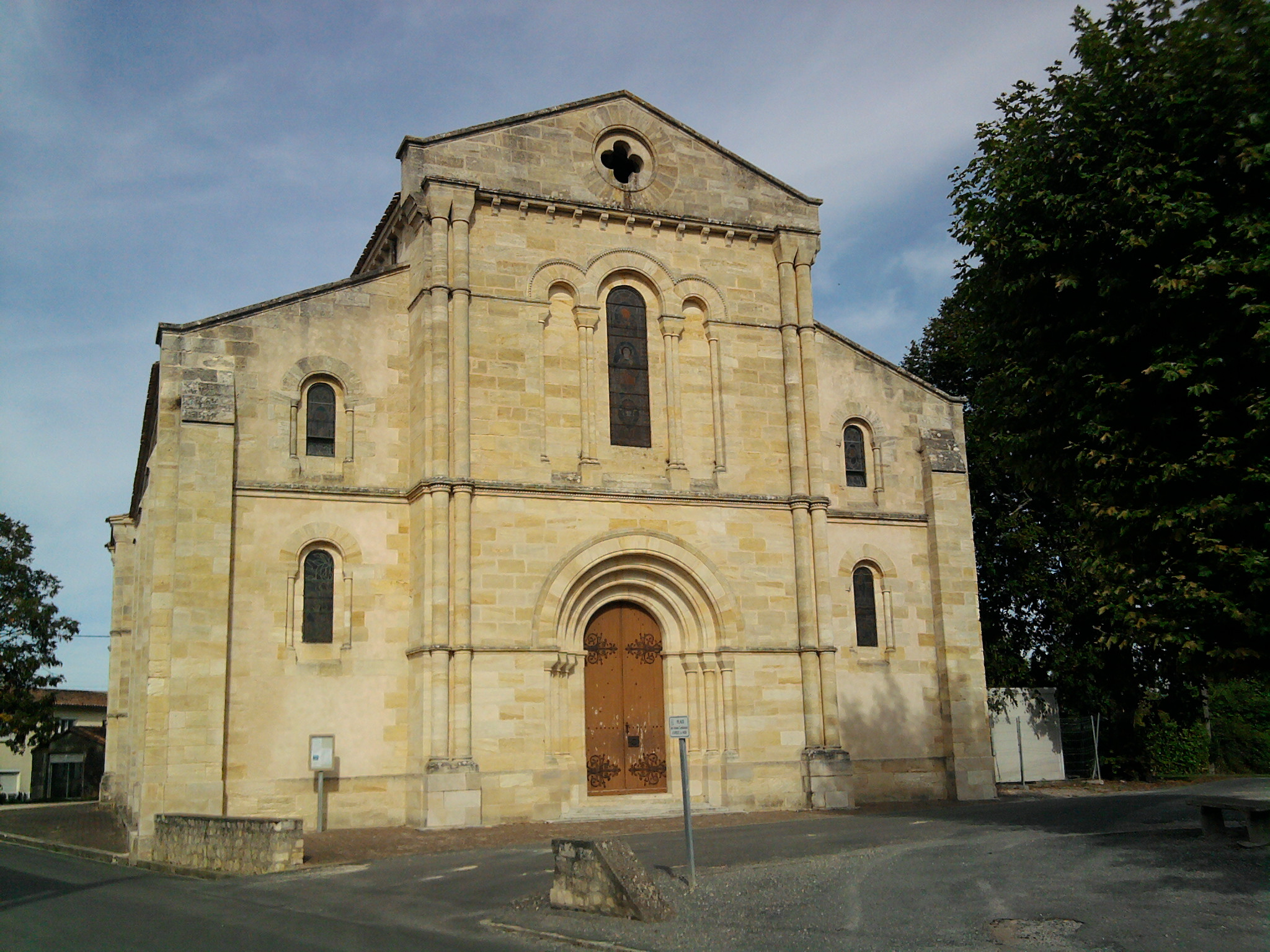
- The church in Gaillan-en-Médoc
- Location of Gaillan-en-Médoc
- Location within France Location within Nouvelle-Aquitaine
- Coordinates: 45°19′33″N 0°57′12″W
- Country: France
- Region: Nouvelle-Aquitaine
- Department: Gironde
- Arrondissement: Lesparre-Médoc
- Canton: Le Nord-Médoc

Government
  - Mayor (2021–2026): Bertrand Texeraud
- Area^{1}: 42.02 km^{2} (16.22 sq mi)
- Elevation: 13 m (43 ft)
- Highest elevation: 20 m (66 ft)
- Lowest elevation: 7 m (23 ft)
- Population (2023): 2,385
  - Density: 56.76/km^{2} (147.0/sq mi)
- Time zone: UTC+01:00 (CET)
  - Summer (DST): UTC+02:00 (CEST)
- INSEE/Postal code: 33177 /33340
- ^{1} French Land Register data, which excludes lakes, ponds, glaciers > 1 km^{2} (0.386 sq mi or 247 acres) and river estuaries.

Gaillan-en-Médoc (French pronunciation: [ɡajɑ̃ ɑ̃ medɔk], literally Gaillan in Médoc; Occitan: Galhan de Medòc) is a commune in the Gironde department in southwestern France.

== Population ==
Historical population
Year	Pop.	±% p.a.
1968	1,229	—
1975	1,274	+0.52%
1982	1,482	+2.18%
1990	1,773	+2.27%
1999	1,915	+0.86%
2007	2,031	+0.74%
2012	2,084	+0.52%
2017	2,323	+2.20%
2023	2,385	+0.44%
Source: INSEE

== See also ==
- Communes of the Gironde department
