= Talais =

- Commune
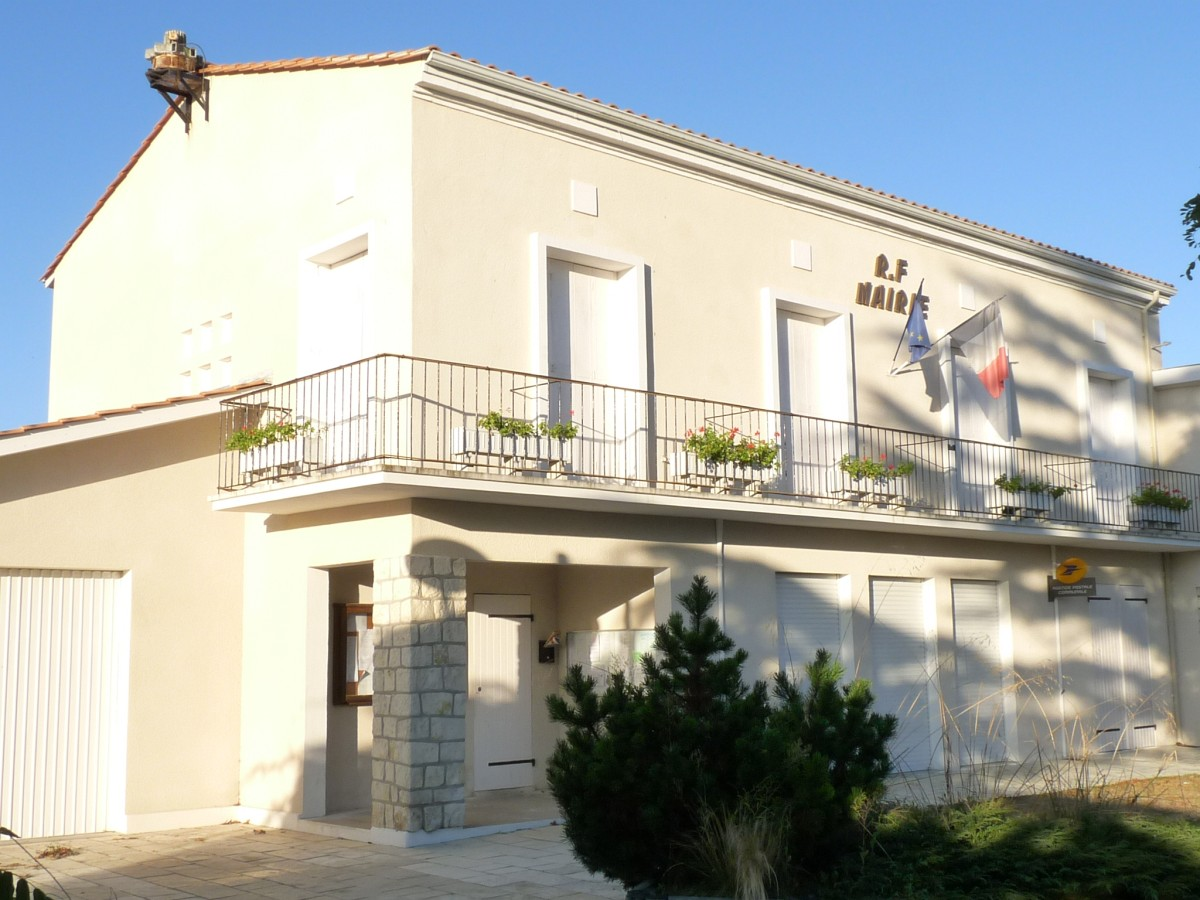
- The town hall in Talais
- Location of Talais
- Location within France Location within Nouvelle-Aquitaine
- Coordinates: 45°28′23″N 1°03′23″W
- Country: France
- Region: Nouvelle-Aquitaine
- Department: Gironde
- Arrondissement: Lesparre-Médoc
- Canton: Le Nord-Médoc

Government
  - Mayor (2020–2026): Franck Laporte
- Area^{1}: 15.27 km^{2} (5.90 sq mi)
- Elevation: 4 m (13 ft)
- Highest elevation: 16 m (52 ft)
- Lowest elevation: 0 m (0 ft)
- Population (2023): 764
  - Density: 50.0/km^{2} (130/sq mi)
- Time zone: UTC+01:00 (CET)
  - Summer (DST): UTC+02:00 (CEST)
- INSEE/Postal code: 33521 /33590
- ^{1} French Land Register data, which excludes lakes, ponds, glaciers > 1 km^{2} (0.386 sq mi or 247 acres) and river estuaries.

Talais (French pronunciation: [talɛ]) is a commune in the Gironde department in Nouvelle-Aquitaine in southwestern France.

== Population ==
Historical population
| Year | Pop. | ±% p.a. |
|---|---|---|
| 1968 | 549 | — |
| 1975 | 566 | +0.44% |
| 1982 | 542 | −0.62% |
| 1990 | 599 | +1.26% |
| 1999 | 547 | −1.00% |
| 2007 | 626 | +1.70% |
| 2012 | 683 | +1.76% |
| 2017 | 741 | +1.64% |
| 2023 | 764 | +0.51% |
Source: INSEE

== See also ==
- Communes of the Gironde department
