= Margaux AOC =

French wine growing commune in Bordeaux

Margaux is a wine growing commune and Appellation d'origine contrôlée within Haut-Médoc in Bordeaux, centred on the village of Margaux. Its leading (premier cru) château is also called Margaux. It contains 21 cru classé châteaux, more than any other commune in Bordeaux.

== Geography ==
As well as Margaux itself, the appellation includes the villages of Cantenac, Arsac, Soussans and Labarde. It is on the left bank of the Gironde. It is the southernmost appellation in the Médoc (the haut in Haut-Médoc refers to the fact that it lies upstream), not far north of Bordeaux itself. To the east is the Landes forest. The soil is the thinnest in the Médoc, with the highest proportion of gravel. (The generally perceived opinion being that poor soil makes good wine.) The gravel provides good drainage. The forest to the west shelters the vines from Atlantic breezes. Margaux contains 1,413 hectares (3,490 acres) of vineyards, making it the second largest appellation in the Haut-Médoc (after Saint-Estèphe). The châteaux are concentrated in the village, and the vineyards are more intermingled than elsewhere. The vines ripen 7–10 days before the rest of the Médoc.

== Wine ==
Cabernet Sauvignon is the predominant grape, but it is invariably blended with other grapes. As with all red Bordeaux, Merlot, Cabernet Franc, Petit Verdot, Carmenère, and Malbec may also be included in the blend (although wines will not necessarily include all six grapes). The wine is known for its perfumed fragrance. The dominant fruit flavour is blackcurrant. The wine from the southern part of the appellation (i.e. Cantenac, Arsac and Labarde) tends to be more powerful but less fragrant, and leans more towards plum.

Wine from Margaux may be labelled as Haut-Médoc (usually wine which the château considers inferior to its main offering and wishes to market under a different label). It would also be possible (though unusual) for the wine to be labelled using the Médoc AOC or one of the Regional Bordeaux AOCs.

== Châteaux ==
=== First growth ===
Château Margaux

=== Second growths ===
Château Rauzan-Ségla, Château Rauzan-Gassies, Château Durfort-Vivens, Château Lascombes, Château Brane-Cantenac

=== Third growths ===
Château Kirwan, Château d'Issan, Château Giscours, Château Malescot St. Exupéry, Château Cantenac-Brown, Château Boyd-Cantenac, Château Palmer, Château Desmirail, Château Ferrière, Château Marquis d'Alesme Becker

=== Fourth growths ===
Château Pouget, Château Prieuré-Lichine, Château Marquis de Terme

=== Fifth growths ===
Château Dauzac, Château du Tertre

=== Notable unclassed châteaux ===
Château Bel Air Marquis d'Aligre, Château Monbrison, Château Siran, Château Labégorce-Zédé, Château La Tour de Mons, Château La Gurgue, Château Labégorce, Château d'Angludet
