= Cantenac =

Commune in Gironde, France

- Part of Margaux-Cantenac
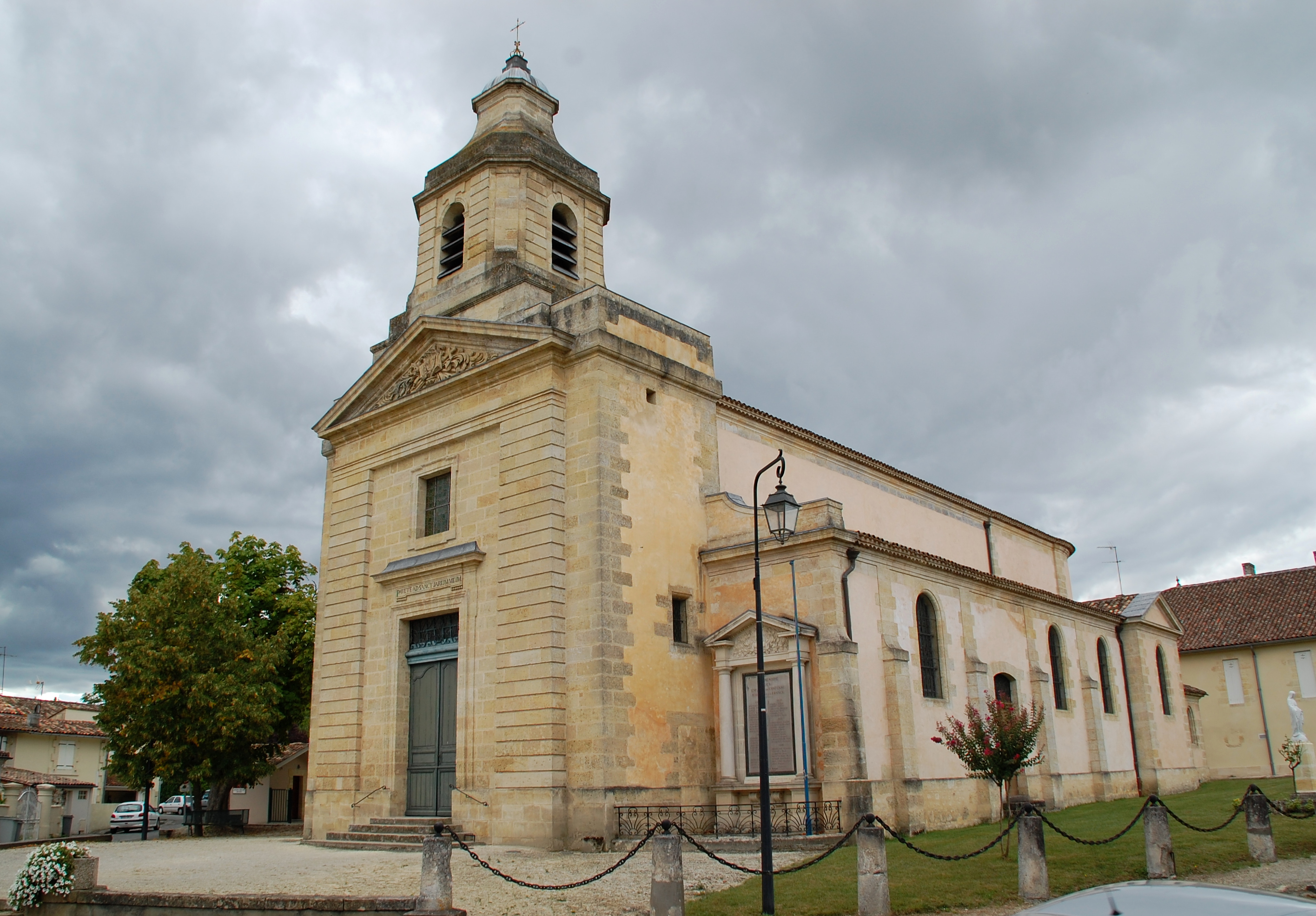
- Location of Cantenac
- Location within France Location within Nouvelle-Aquitaine
- Coordinates: 45°01′45″N 0°39′09″W
- Country: France
- Region: Nouvelle-Aquitaine
- Department: Gironde
- Arrondissement: Lesparre-Médoc
- Canton: Le Sud-Médoc
- Commune: Margaux-Cantenac
- Area^{1}: 14.26 km^{2} (5.51 sq mi)
- Elevation: 30 m (98 ft)
- Highest elevation: 22 m (72 ft)
- Lowest elevation: 1 m (3.3 ft)
- Population (2017): 1,375
  - Density: 96.42/km^{2} (249.7/sq mi)
- Time zone: UTC+01:00 (CET)
  - Summer (DST): UTC+02:00 (CEST)
- Postal code: 33460
- ^{1} French Land Register data, which excludes lakes, ponds, glaciers > 1 km^{2} (0.386 sq mi or 247 acres) and river estuaries.

Cantenac (French pronunciation: [kɑ̃tnak]) is a former commune in the Gironde department in Nouvelle-Aquitaine in southwestern France. On 1 January 2017, it was merged into the new commune Margaux-Cantenac. It is located near Bordeaux.

== Population ==
Historical population
| Year | Pop. | ±% p.a. |
|---|---|---|
| 1962 | 900 | — |
| 1968 | 1,054 | +2.67% |
| 1975 | 1,125 | +0.94% |
| 1982 | 1,300 | +2.09% |
| 1990 | 1,197 | −1.03% |
| 1999 | 1,179 | −0.17% |
| 2017 | 1,375 | +0.86% |
Source: EHESS and INSEE

== Wine ==
Situated on the Left bank of the Gironde in the region Haut-Médoc, the area is home to many wineries, however following a law of 1954, Cantenac wines fall under the Margaux AOC, as there is no appreciable difference between the two communes. The chateaux of Cantenac that were ranked at the Bordeaux Wine Official Classification of 1855 are:

- Château Brane-Cantenac
- Château Kirwan
- Château d'Issan
- Château Palmer
- Château Boyd-Cantenac
- Château Cantenac-Brown
- Château Prieuré-Lichine
- Château Pouget

== See also ==
- Bordeaux wine regions
- Communes of the Gironde department
