= Château Palmer =

French winery

Coordinates: 45.0369°N 0.6694°W

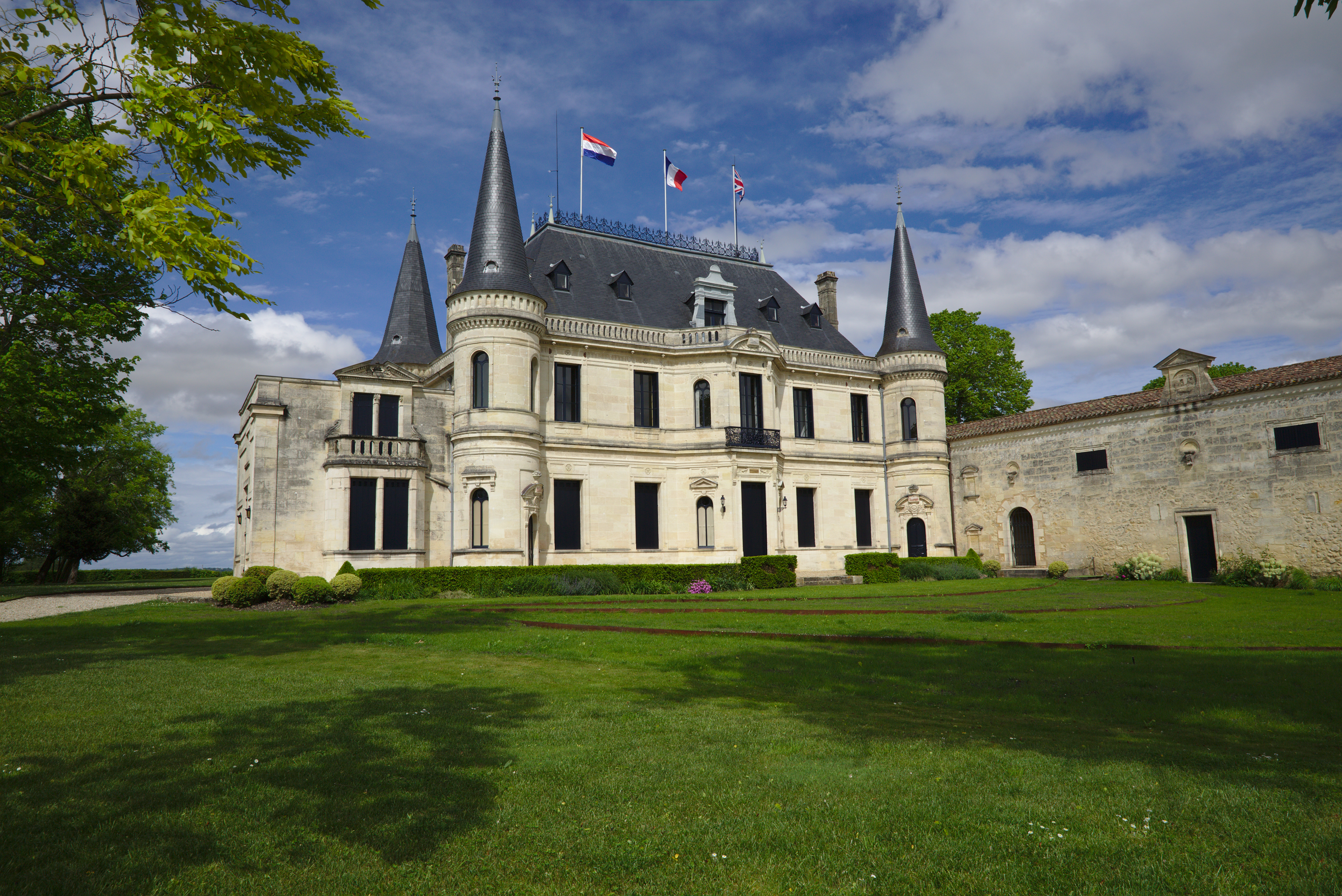
- Location: Margaux-Cantenac, France
- Coordinates: 45°2'23"N, 0°40'26"W
- Wine region: Margaux
- Formerly: Domaine de Gasq
- Founded: 18th
- Area cultivated: 163
- Website: chateau-palmer.com

Château Palmer is a wine estate located in Margaux-Cantenac, Gironde. Classified as a Troisième Grand Cru in the Bordeaux Wine Official Classification of 1855, it is part of the Margaux appellation and is widely regarded as one of the two most prominent Third Growths. Since 1998, the estate has also produced a second label, Alter Ego de Palmer, drawn from the same terroirs but vinified separately to yield an earlier-drinking wine.

== History ==
=== Origins and Charles Palmer ===
The estate, known as Domaine de Gascq since the early 18th century, belonged to the de Gascq family, whose clairets were already renowned and served at the court of Versailles. The de Gascq family, councillors and presidents at the Parlement of Bordeaux, had ties to the great winegrowing families of the region: Jeanne de Gascq had married Jacques de Ségur, founder of the Château Lafite vineyard in Pauillac.

On 16 June 1814, Charles Palmer, a British officer, career military man and Whig (later Liberal) politician, acquired the estate from Marie Brunet de Ferrière, widow of Blaise Jean Charles Alexandre de Gascq, for the sum of 100,000 francs, of which 60,000 was paid in cash, plus an annual life annuity of 500 litres of wine. At the time of the purchase, Palmer was a Major-General in the Prince of Wales's 10th Regiment of Hussars and aide-de-camp to the Prince Regent. Alongside his military career, he sat in the House of Commons as MP for Bath in two periods, from 1808 to 1826 and again from 1830 to 1837, succeeding his father John Palmer, himself an MP and owner of the Theatre Royal, Bath, which Charles would later inherit.

The originality of his undertaking lay not in acquiring a single existing wine château, but in consolidating scattered vines and land into a vast estate to which he gave his name. In this sense, Charles Palmer was truly a founder, not merely a buyer of an existing property.

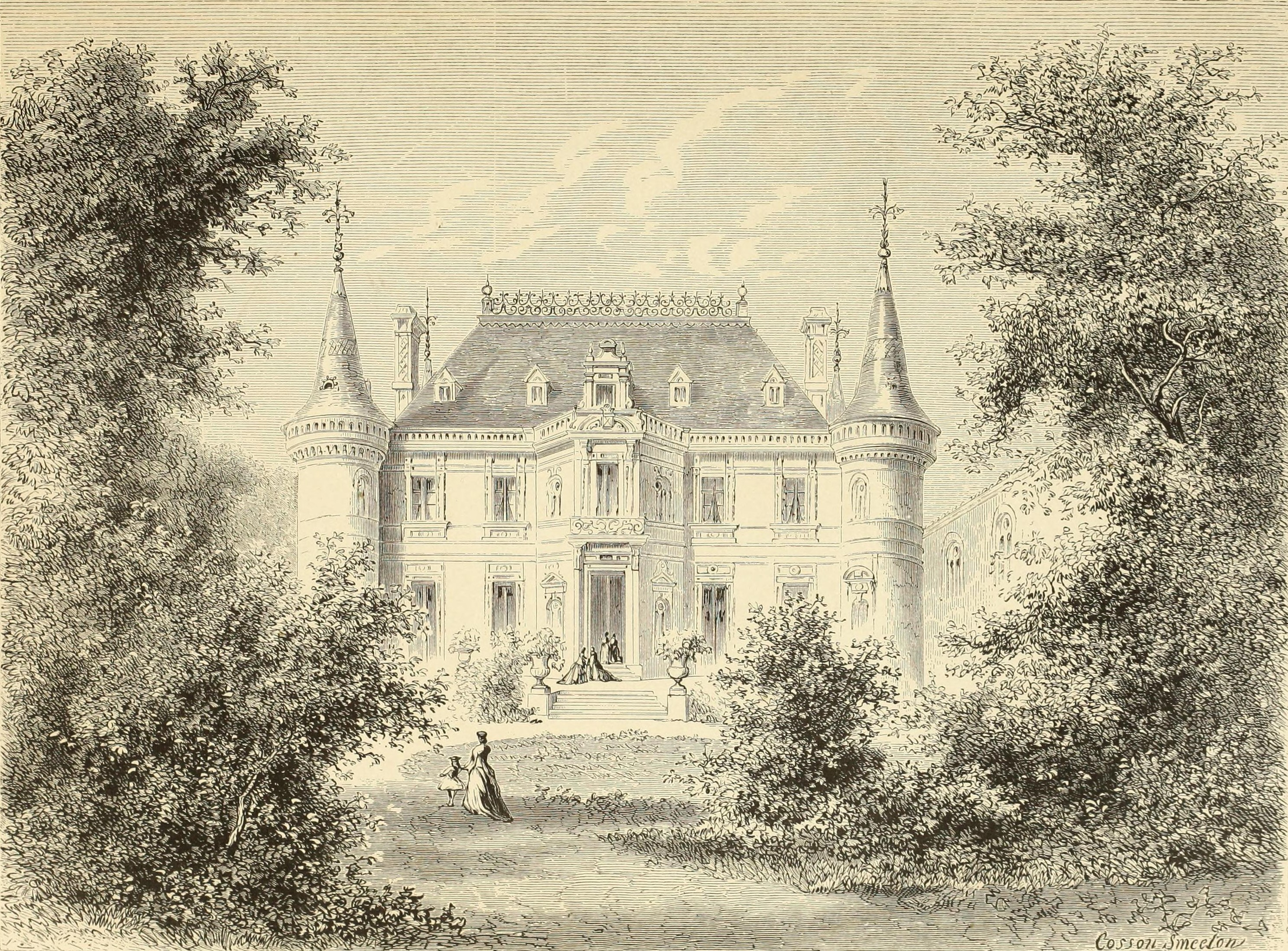
Château Palmer in 1838

Palmer gradually expanded the property between 1816 and 1831, purchasing land in the communes of Cantenac, Issan and Margaux. The estate reached 163 hectares, including 82 hectares of vines. He had housing built for vineyard workers, a cellar holding 15 oak barrels, and three presses. Operations were entrusted to the merchant Paul Estenave and the estate manager Jean Lagunegrand, while Palmer resided mainly in Bath. In 1831 he relinquished his military commission but retained his rank. Burdened by debt and fallen out of favour, he was forced to sell the estate to the Caisse Hypothécaire in 1843. He died on 17 April 1851, aged 73, in a rented apartment at 35 Warren Street in London, with no fortune left.

Charles Palmer died before seeing the château bearing his name ranked among the great classified growths of Bordeaux, as a third growth (troisième grand cru classé) in the 1855 classification.

An anecdote recorded in Captain Gronow's memoirs recounts a tasting of Palmer's clairet organized by the Prince Regent (the future George IV). Tasting the wine, the Prince quoted Shakespeare, declaring that its bouquet evoked the "holy Palmer's kiss," a reference to Romeo and Juliet. The episode took an unfortunate turn when Lord Yarmouth, Palmer's rival, asked for a hermitaged Bordeaux (blended with Rhône wine, a common practice at the time) to be brought for comparison, along with anchovy sandwiches - a fatal pairing for Palmer's delicate clairet.

=== The Pereire brothers ===
Émile and Isaac Pereire, Saint-Simonian bankers and entrepreneurs of Portuguese-Jewish origin born in Bordeaux in 1800 and 1806 respectively, acquired the estate and its 83-hectare vineyard in 1853 from the Caisse Hypothécaire. Already renowned for their achievements in the railway industry (the Paris–Saint-Germain-en-Laye line, 1837, and the Bordeaux–Bayonne line) and in the development of the town of Arcachon, they entrusted management of the estate to a new manager, Mr. Lefort, regarded as one of the finest technicians of his day, and later to Louis Mellet.

In 1853, they commissioned the architect Charles Burguet - known in Bordeaux for the Musée des Beaux-Arts, Château Pichon Longueville Baron, and a wing of the Bourse - to build the present-day château, with its characteristic conical turrets and slate roofs.

In 1917, composer Claude Debussy ordered two cases of the 1909 vintage. In June 1937, after more than eighty years of family ownership, the Pereire descendants decided to part with the estate. Its acquisition by four families from the Bordeaux wine trade - Ginestet, Miailhe, Mähler-Besse and Sichel - took place in 1938.

=== After 1938 ===
In 1950, the Ginestet family, followed gradually by the Miailhe family, sold their shares to the Mähler-Besse and Sichel families, who remain co-owners to this day. The estate was managed by Jean Bouteiller (1913–1962), husband of Olga Mähler-Besse, until his death. His son Bertrand Bouteiller succeeded him and ran the château until 2004.

The estate's continuity owes much to the Chardon family, present on the property for several generations. Pierre Chardon, born at Palmer in 1903, became estate manager in 1938 after having worked as a prix-faiteur (vineyard foreman) there. He also served as mayor of Cantenac for several decades. In January 1961 he was made a Knight of the Legion of Honour. His sons Claude and Yves Chardon succeeded him and spent their entire careers at Palmer until their retirement at the end of 1996.

In 2004, the shareholders appointed Thomas Duroux, an agronomist and oenologist, as managing director. He had previously worked in Hungary (Pajzos Megyer), South Africa, California (Robert Mondavi), and Tuscany, notably at Tenuta dell'Ornellaia. Under his leadership, the estate undertook a profound transformation of its viticultural practices toward biodynamics, as well as an expansion of the Palmer project into a holistic farm incorporating market gardening and livestock.

== The Vineyard ==
=== Geology ===
The Château Palmer vineyard covers 66 hectares of vines, within a total estate of 100 hectares that also includes meadows, woodland and buildings. It is planted on the crest of Günzian gravel mounds, formations dating from the Quaternary era: rock debris torn from the Massif Central and the Pyrenees by glacial outwash was carried by the Garonne and Dordogne rivers before settling on the region's "Bordeaux stone," an asteria-bearing limestone substrate. The shaping of these gravel mounds into ridges resulted from successive fluctuations in sea level. During warmer periods, the tops of the mounds were enriched with fine clay particles, giving Palmer's soils a higher proportion of clay than the average for Margaux gravels.

On his arrival in 2004, Thomas Duroux launched an in-depth mapping of the terroir (aerial and infrared analysis, soil electrical resistivity surveys, soil pits), revealing some twenty distinct terroir types within the same vineyard, with significant variation in the proportions of sand, clay and gravel from one parcel to another.

=== Grape varieties ===
The current planting is split equally between Cabernet Sauvignon and Merlot (47% each), with the remaining 6% Petit Verdot. This proportion of Merlot is unusual in the Médoc, where Cabernet Sauvignon typically predominates.

In the 1920s, however, Merlot accounted for only 3% of Palmer's plantings, the estate then being dominated by Cabernet Sauvignon and older varieties such as Malbec and Petit Verdot. Starting in the 1940s, Louis Miailhe decided to plant Merlot extensively on the estate's most clay-rich parcels, convinced that Palmer's clayier gravel soils were particularly well suited to it. Under his direction, the proportion of Merlot reached 60% before being brought back down to 47% by Jean Bouteiller in the 1950s, a level at which it has remained stable ever since.

== The Wines ==
=== Winemaking ===
Vinification takes place in temperature-controlled stainless steel vats, by grape variety and by parcel. Blending follows a three-way logic, with vats divided into three lots: those destined for the Grand Vin, those destined for Alter Ego, and a third, "undecided" lot representing roughly 30% of the vineyard, whose allocation varies depending on the characteristics of the vintage.

Since the 2014 harvest, no sulfur has been added at the time of tank filling; the first addition of sulfur now comes only after malolactic fermentation. The wines are then fined with egg white and racked by gravity. Aging in wood lasts 20 to 22 months in total, first in Bordeaux oak barrels, supplemented in the second year by 30-hectolitre wooden vats (foudres). Bottling is carried out at the château.

=== Red wines ===
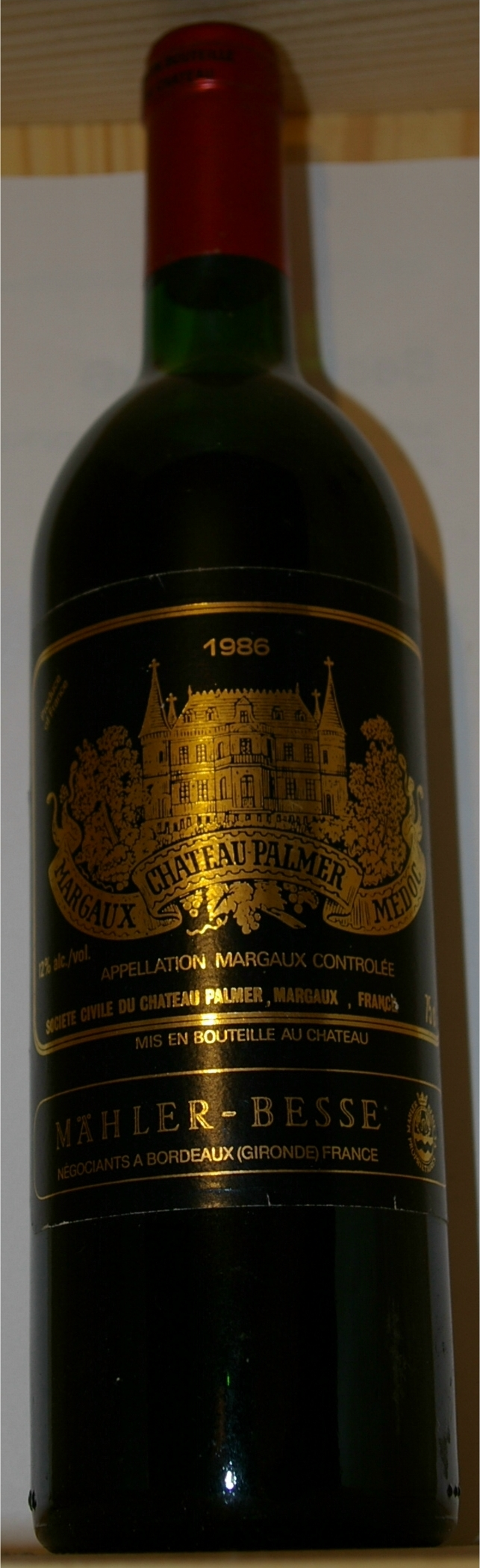
Wine bottle from Château palmer, vintage 1986

Château Palmer's wines stand out within the Margaux appellation for their unusually high proportion of Merlot for the Médoc, which gives them a velvety texture and a finesse closer to the wines of Pomerol, whereas their neighbours tend more toward the tannic power of Cabernet Sauvignon.

Three red wines are produced:

- Château Palmer: a blend in equal parts of Cabernet Sauvignon and Merlot, rounded out with a touch of Petit Verdot. The Merlot lends it a velvety, unctuous quality that sets it apart from its neighbours in the appellation; tasters note a bouquet of flowers, dark fruit and spice, with a silky texture that develops over several decades.Aged 20 to 22 months, first in 225-litre Bordeaux barrels (50–60% new oak), then in 30-hectolitre wooden vats sourced from the Stockinger and Seguin Moreau cooperages. Annual production is around 100,000 bottles.
- Alter Ego: launched with the 1998 vintage, Alter Ego was conceived as a separate wine, made from the lightest gravel parcels most characteristic of the Margaux appellation, sharing the same velvety tannin and elegance as the Grand Vin. It is aged for 20 to 22 months following the same method: half in barrels (25–35% new oak), half in wooden vats. Annual production is around 80,000 bottles. Before 1998, the estate had, in certain years, marketed a second wine under the label Réserve du Général.
- Historical XIXth Century Wine: a "hermitaged" wine, made primarily from Palmer wine blended with a proportion of Syrah from the northern hillsides of the Rhône Valley, whose exact origin the estate keeps secret. Created in 2004 by Thomas Duroux to revive a 19th-century Bordeaux tradition, after he tasted a century-old hermitaged wine at the home of a Californian collector. It is non-vintage and does not carry the Margaux appellation on its label.

=== White wine ===
Palmer also produces a white wine made from nearly extinct grape varieties brought back into cultivation: predominantly Muscadelle, alongside Sauvignon Gris and Lozet. Originally made for the estate's own consumption, an earlier white wine had existed in the 1920s before being abandoned in the 1930s.

In the late 1990s, two bottles of the 1925 vintage were discovered in the château's cellars. Tasting them convinced Thomas Duroux to relaunch production, after research into old Bordeaux white grape varieties. The Vin Blanc de Château Palmer, first produced with the 2007 vintage, was reserved for the estate's shareholders until 2010; it has since been sold commercially in small quantities, around 100 cases a year.

== Biodynamic Agriculture ==
From 2007, the estate carried out an in-depth mapping of its terroir: around fifty soil pits were dug and a map of soil electrical resistivity was produced, making it possible to precisely identify the structure of each parcel and adapt viticultural practices accordingly.

The first biodynamic trials began in 2009 on the Boulibranne parcel, a one-hectare test plot, with micro-vinifications and blind tastings carried out. Full conversion of the entire vineyard was decided in 2014, with the approval of the shareholders. The estate obtained Demeter biodynamic certification in 2018. That same year, an exceptional outbreak of mildew destroyed between two-thirds and three-quarters of the harvest, an ordeal the estate openly acknowledged as the cost of its commitment to biodynamics. The very limited 2018 vintage was nonetheless praised by critics as exceptional.

== Agricultural Production ==
Since the early stages of its shift to biodynamics, Château Palmer has gradually reinvented itself as a holistic farm aiming for autonomy and circularity, moving away from monoculture to revive a tradition of mixed farming and livestock raising.

=== Market gardening ===
In 2020, the estate entrusted a market gardener specializing in land ecology with transforming a fallow parcel into a vegetable garden. By 2024, the garden covered around 3,200 square metres across several plots. Heirloom seeds, sourced from the Conservatoire du Goût in Floirac, are selected for their flavour rather than their yield. During the 2023 harvest, 85% of the vegetables served at La Cantine de Palmer came from the estate itself.

=== Livestock ===
At the end of 2014, the estate introduced a herd of Bordelaise cattle, a hardy and nearly extinct breed native to the Gironde, revived with the help of the Conservatoire des Races d'Aquitaine, along with Gascon pigs, Landes sheep and Pyrenean goats. The livestock produce manure which, mixed with vine cuttings and grape pomace, forms the estate's compost.

=== Tree planting ===
The agroforestry project was launched at the end of 2016 with the planting of the first hundred fruit trees and more than a kilometre of hedgerows of varied species, including hazel, laurel, hornbeam and dog rose. It continued in subsequent years with the development of ecological corridors and experimental orchards. In total, 450 trees were planted in 2020, 710 in 2021, and 110 in 2022. Altogether, more than a thousand trees have been planted, at a rate of around fifteen per hectare, arranged irregularly to break up the symmetry of the vine rows.

Species are chosen according to the nature of the terroir: Reinette de Bayeux apple trees on clay soils, Napoléon cherry trees, Williams pear trees, Mirabelle de Nancy plum trees, Bergeron apricot trees and blackthorn on sandier land. Species with therapeutic benefits for the soil are also included: willow for its preventive effect against fungal diseases, and oak bark against mildew.

The trees help regulate the microclimate by tempering heat peaks, drain water after heavy rains and limit runoff. They create ecological niches for birds, bats and beneficial insects, and stimulate soil microbial life through root networks and the rhizosphere.

== Hospitality ==
The estate offers La Table de Palmer, a dining experience for a small number of guests, led by executive chef Jean-Denis Le Bras, originally from Landivisiau in Finistère. It begins with a walk through the vineyard, the vegetable garden and the livestock area, followed by a gastronomic meal served in the château's reception rooms.

After spending eighteen years working alongside chef Pierre Gagnaire in Paris, Saint-Barthélemy, London and Hong Kong - where he earned two Michelin stars at the restaurant Pierre in 2013 - Le Bras took over the kitchens of La Grande Maison de Bordeaux, an establishment owned by Bernard Magrez under the artistic direction of Pierre Gagnaire, succeeding Joël Robuchon, from 2016 to 2020, where he also earned two Michelin stars. He joined Château Palmer in 2023.

The estate has also opened La Cantine de Palmer, a daily lunch venue open to estate employees and outside visitors from Monday to Friday, offering a single set menu based on produce from the biodynamic vegetable garden.

== Culture ==
=== Jazz ===
Between 2010 and 2019, Château Palmer ran a music programme centred on jazz, called Hear Palmer. Concerts and recording sessions were held in the estate's cellar during the Primeurs week, pairing vintages with musical performances. These private concerts featured musicians including notamment Michel Portal, Yaron Herman, Emile Parisien, Archie Shepp ou Dan Tepfer. Photographer Guy Le Querrec, a member of Magnum Photos, documented several editions.

In 2023, the estate began a new partnership with the German label ACT Music for a vinyl record collection called Edition Palmer. The first release, DUO, by pianists Joachim Kühn and Michael Wollny, recorded live at the Alte Oper in Frankfurt, was pressed in a limited edition of 500 copies on 180-gram audiophile vinyl. A second album, TRIO, featuring Swedish double bassist Lars Danielsson, British guitarist John Parricelli and Finnish trumpeter Verneri Pohjola, was recorded live at the château the following year, marking the beginning of the venue's occasional use as a recording studio.

=== Photography ===
In partnership with Leica, Château Palmer launched the INSTANTS artist residency in 2023. Each year, the residency hosts a contemporary professional photographer working on a "carte blanche" basis. Artists are selected by a panel of nominators and then chosen by a jury in consultation with the INSTANTS artistic committee. Production takes place between February and October. The resulting work is presented through a three-month exhibition at the Leica Store Paris Village Royal, along with an artist's book published successively by Filigranes (2023–2025) and the(M) éditions (2026). Additional forms of presentation vary depending on the artist.

Residency history:

- Paul Cupido (2023), for the series Séléné, exhibited in Paris, Arles and Cadaqués;
- Henrike Stahl (2024), for the series L'arc sera parmi les nuages, created in part with young workers from the Grand Parc priority district of Bordeaux, who were trained in vineyard work at the estate, and exhibited in the Grand Parc district in 2024;
- SMITH (2025), for the series DAMI, a psycho-geographical investigation combining photography, thermograms, sculpture and text, drawing in part on the discovery that the artist's grandparents had met at Château Palmer. The series was exhibited in Paris, then at the MAC VAL in Vitry-sur-Seine in 2026;
- Alexandra Catiere (2026), a former assistant to Irving Penn and winner of the 2024 Camera Clara prize, whose work was exhibited at the Bibliothèque nationale de France in 2025. Her series Tout en ce lieu me survivra was exhibited at the Galerie Clémentine de la Féronnière and then at the Galerie Leica Paris in 2026.

=== Art journal ===
Since 2017, Château Palmer has published L'Œil de Palmer, an art journal initially issued annually (2015–2022) and later biennially, in a limited edition available in French and English. Each issue explores a cross-cutting theme combining photography, literature, illustration and essays, connected to the estate's ecosystem and cultural affinities. The issues published to date are: Bleu Palmer (2015), L'Instant photographique (2016), Le Jardin (2017), Jeux d'écriture (2018), Jazz (2019), Le Cercle (2020), Le Labyrinthe (2021), Infini (2022) and Devenir une île (2025).

A special edition, La Mémoire de L'Œil, published in 2022, pairs fifty vintages of Château Palmer with fifty photographs by Guy Le Querrec spanning half a century of jazz history.

== Criticism & Controversy ==
In October 2020, Spanish seasonal workers denounced abuse in the workplace and lack of accommodation during harvest season. Château Palmer's managing director formally denied all the claims. He noted that the journalist had contacted the estate via its website contact form and that the article had been published only a few hours after the initial request, leaving no time for the estate to respond during the demands of harvest season. An internal inquiry found no corroboration of the allegations. No independent investigation or judicial follow-up was publicly reported.
