= Château Pédesclaux =

Winery in France

Coordinates: 45.2114°N 0.7582°W

Label from a bottle of Château Pédesclaux wine.

Château Pédesclaux is a winery in the Pauillac appellation of the Bordeaux region of France. The wine produced here was classified as one of eighteen Cinquièmes Crus (Fifth Growths) in the Bordeaux Wine Official Classification of 1855.

== History ==
The Château was founded in 1810 by wine broker Pierre Urbain Pédesclaux, who passed it to his son Pierre-Edmond in 1849. After death of the latter his widow continued to run the Château until 1891, when the estate was sold to the Count de Gastebois. In 1930, Lucien Jugla became tenant, and eventually purchased the Château in 1950. In 1960, Lucien Jugla added Château Belle-Rose, a 13.7-hectare estate which he had been farming since 1943, to Pédesclaux. Belle-Rose’s bourgeois building became the home of the classified growth and appeared on the new labels. In 2009, the estate was purchased by Jacky Lorenzetti, who also owns Chateau Lilian Ladouys in Saint-Estèphe and 50% of Château d'Issan in Margaux. Lorenzetti enlarged the vineyards with the purchase of 12 hectares of Medoc vines that are situated next to parcels owned by Chateau Lafite Rothschild and Chateau Mouton Rothschild.

== Vineyards and wines ==
The vineyard covers an area of 46 hectares and produces about 8,000 cases of wine every year. The Château has 44 hectares in Pauillac, but also two hectares in the Haut-Médoc area. Wines from Pédesclaux are composed of roughly 47% Cabernet Sauvignon, 48% Merlot, 3% Petit Verdot and 2% Cabernet franc. The estate produces three wines: the first wine, Château Pédesclaux, the second wine, Fleur de Pédesclaux and finally a third wine, Le Haut-Médoc de Pédesclaux, sold under the Haut-Médoc appellation.

== See also ==
- Bordeaux wine
- French wine
