= Georges Berger =

Georges Berger may refer to:

- Georges Berger (engineer), French engineer
- Georges Berger (gymnast), French gymnast
- Georges Berger (racing driver), Belgian racing driver
