= Château La Tour de Mons =

Coordinates: 45.05889°N 0.69126°W

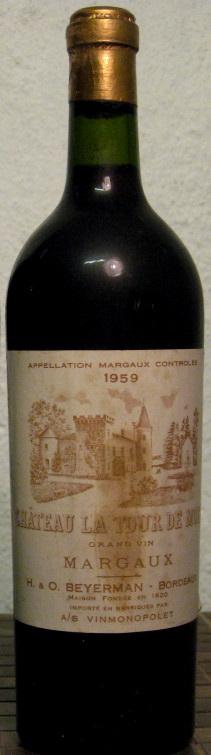
A bottle of the 1959 vintage. The label depicts the estate château as it was before it burned down in 1895.

Château La Tour de Mons, archaically named Tour de Marsac, is a winery and wine from the appellation Margaux, located in the Left Bank of the Bordeaux wine region of France, in the commune of Soussans. The wine was rated Cru Supérieur in the Cru Bourgeois classification of 1932, and through later revisions until the temporary annulment of the classification in 2007.

The winery also produces a second wine named Marquis de Mons Margaux.

== History ==
The estate is traced back to the 15th century, and initial efforts of restoration are dated to 1615 when the property came to the de Mons family through the marriage of Pierre de Mons and the sole daughter of the Baron de Soussans. Remaining the property of connecting families, the estate under the ownership of the Clauzel, Binaud and Cruchet, heirs of Pierre Dubos, long shared patronage with Château Cantemerle, and periodically spells of neglect.

The wine over long periods enjoyed a good reputation, and in the mid-18th century fetched higher prices than Pontet-Canet or Lynch-Bages. It was among the estates proposed by INAO and Alexis Lichine for classification in the early 1960s.

The estate was sold to a group of investors, the Crédit Agricole and the Caisse des Dépôts et des Placements du Québec, in 1995, followed by extensive restorations.

== Production ==
The vineyard area extends 46 hectares (110 acres) with a grape variety distribution of 34% Cabernet Sauvignon, 55% Merlot, 5% Cabernet Franc and 6% Petit Verdot. The annual production averages 323,000 bottles.
