= Gustave Emmanuel Roy =

Founder of HEC Paris

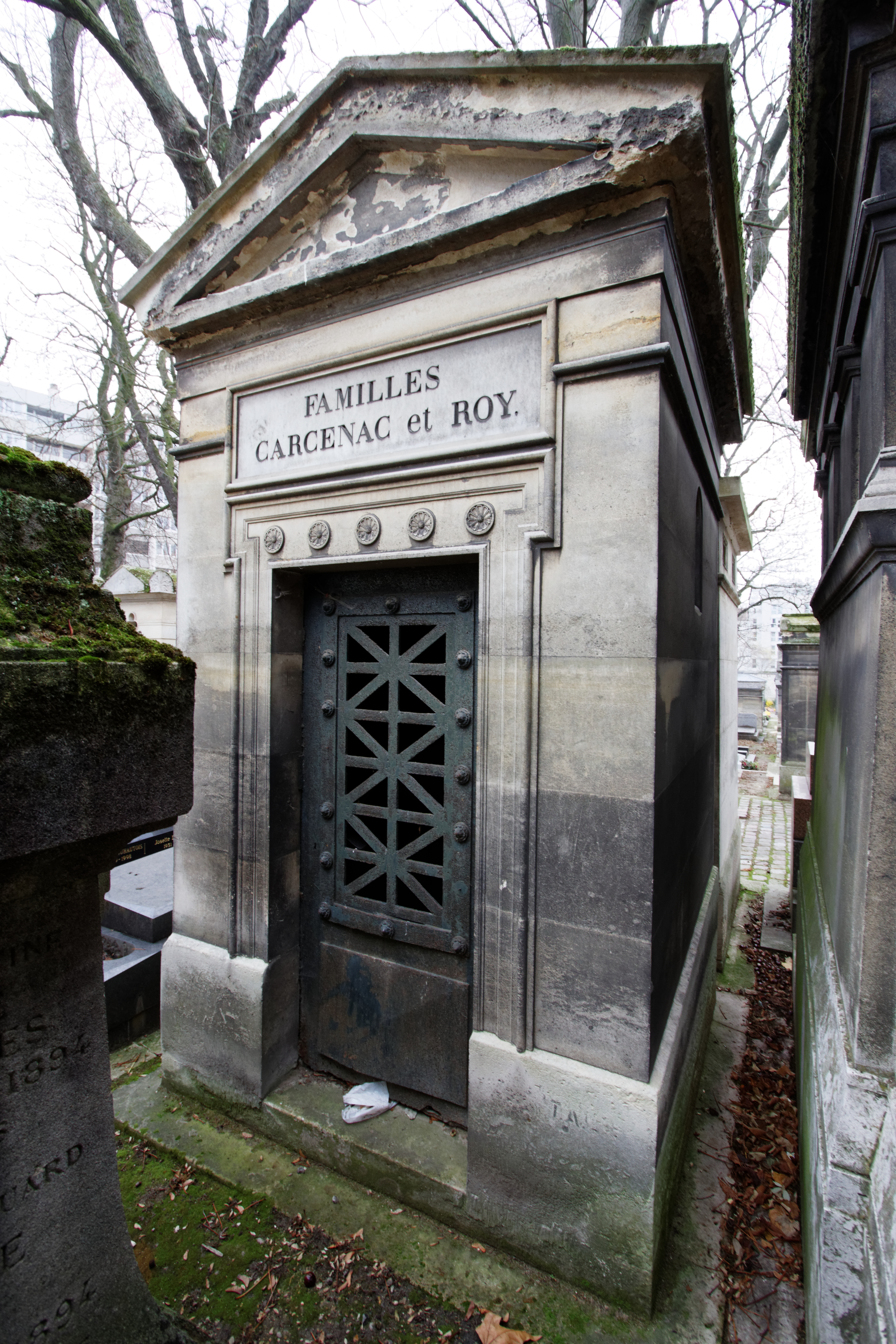
- View of the burial
- Born: Roy; 13 November 1823; Paris
- Died: 20 December 1912 (aged 89); 8th arrondissement of Paris
- Citizenship: French
- Years active: 1847–1912
- Employer: Paris Île-de-France Regional Chamber of Commerce and Industry
- Known for: Founder of HEC Paris
- Relatives: Owner of Château d'Issan, château Brane-Cantenac and château du Fay

Gustave Emmanuel Roy (13 November 1823 in Paris – 20 December 1912 in Paris) was a Parisian merchant of the second half of the 19th century.

== Biography ==
Son of Auguste Emmanuel Roy, merchant and textile industrialist in Reims, and Annette Carcenac (sister of Henry-Gustave Carcenac), he has a sister, Clara, younger than him. His family has been Protestant for generations. He became a partner of "Carcenac & Roy" in 1847, then of "Gustave Roy & Cie" in 1862. At the head of his company "Roy frères", he rose through the ranks and gained notoriety in the closed circle of Parisian bosses, in which he stands out as a fervent defender of free trade. He even became a millionaire, which enabled him, to thank his wife, née Berger, for the birth of her daughter Isabelle, after the infant death of one of the eldest, Hélène, to buy a "campaign", the château du Faÿ, not far from Andrésy.

Elected to the board of directors of the Paris Chamber of Commerce and Industry in 1878, he embarked on the creation of the École des hautes études commerciales de Paris (known today as HEC Paris). On 3 December 1881, it was as president of the Chamber of Commerce that he inaugurated the school, which then moved to Boulevard Malesherbes. President of the Paris Chamber of Commerce from 1881 to 1883, he was vice-president of the Société d'encouragement pour l'industrie nationale, a member of the Consultative Council for Arts and Manufactures and of the Superior Council for Agriculture.

Gustave Roy was also chairman of the board of the insurance company "La France" and a member of the board of directors of the Chemins de fer de l'État, a position in which he campaigned for a revolution in pricing methods.

He was also chairman of the board of directors of the newspaper L'Économiste français.

He was the owner of Château du Faÿ, located in Andrésy, Château d'Issan and Château Brane-Cantenac with his brother-in-law Casimir Berger.

Married to the sister of Georges Berger, he is the father of Gustave Roy (married to Marie Mirabaud) and Ferdinand Roy (married to Hélène Seydoux), as well as the stepfather of Emile Thurneyssen. His second (Hélène) and fifth (Georges) children died at an early age.

He is buried in the Père-Lachaise cemetery (3rd division).

== Bibliography ==
- Question des banques, 1865
- 1823–1906. Souvenirs, 1906
