= Brach, Gironde =

Brach
- Commune
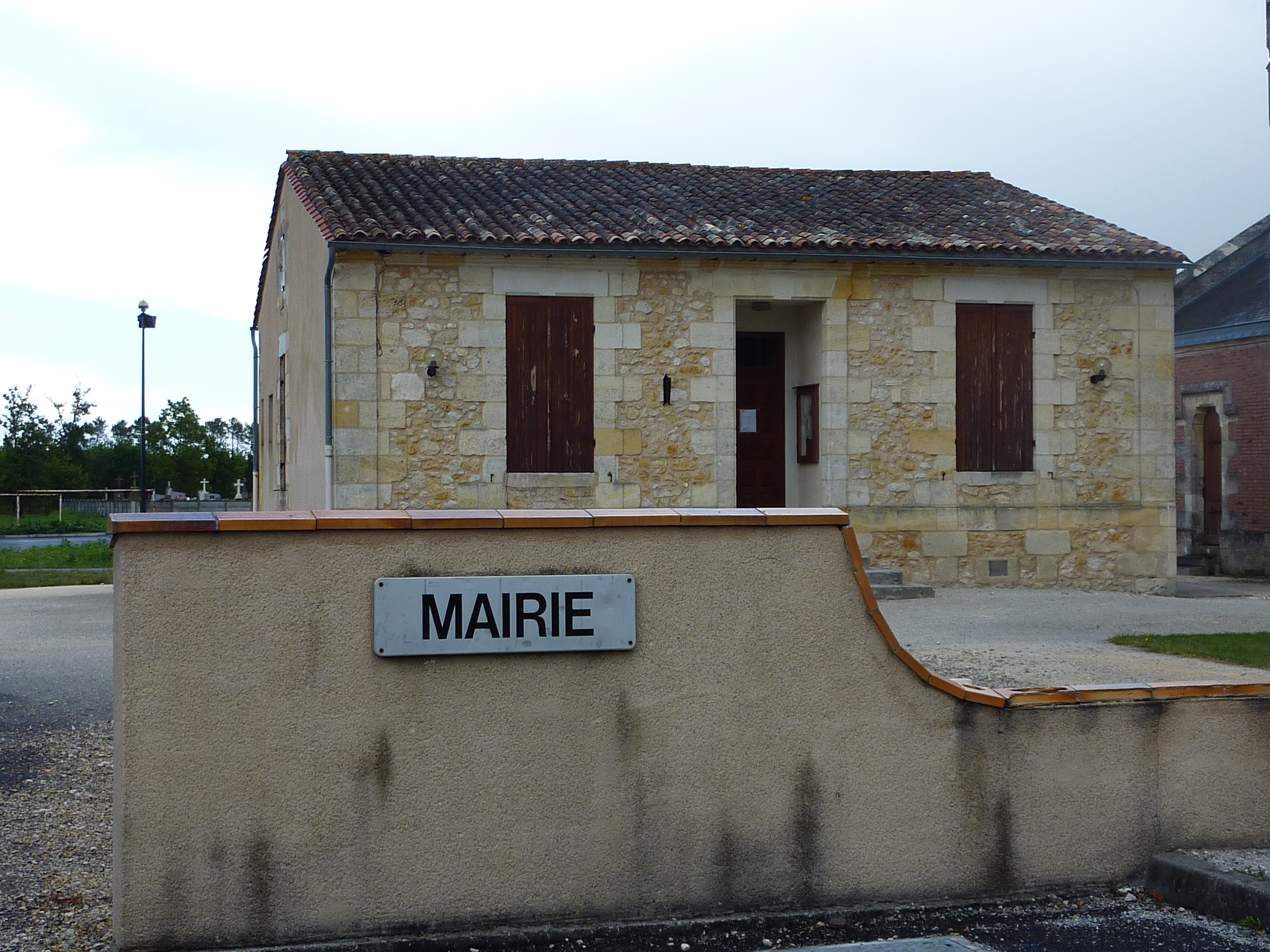
- Town hall

- Coat of arms
- Location of Brach
- Location within France Location within Nouvelle-Aquitaine
- Coordinates: 45°02′31″N 0°56′11″W
- Country: France
- Region: Nouvelle-Aquitaine
- Department: Gironde
- Arrondissement: Lesparre-Médoc
- Canton: Le Sud-Médoc
- Intercommunality: Médulienne

Government
  - Mayor (2020–2026): Didier Phoénix
- Area^{1}: 28.61 km^{2} (11.05 sq mi)
- Elevation: 32 m (105 ft)
- Highest elevation: 39 m (128 ft)
- Lowest elevation: 27 m (89 ft)
- Population (2023): 906
  - Density: 31.7/km^{2} (82.0/sq mi)
- Time zone: UTC+01:00 (CET)
  - Summer (DST): UTC+02:00 (CEST)
- INSEE/Postal code: 33070 /33480
- ^{1} French Land Register data, which excludes lakes, ponds, glaciers > 1 km^{2} (0.386 sq mi or 247 acres) and river estuaries.

Brach (French pronunciation: [bʁaʃ]) is a commune in the Gironde department in Nouvelle-Aquitaine in southwestern France.

== Population ==
Historical population
Year	Pop.	±% p.a.
1968	187	—
1975	162	−2.03%
1982	161	−0.09%
1990	188	+1.96%
1999	235	+2.51%
2007	359	+5.44%
2012	582	+10.15%
2017	667	+2.76%
2023	906	+5.24%
Source: INSEE

== See also ==
- Communes of the Gironde department
