= Lamarque, Gironde =

Lamarque
- Commune
- The town hall in Lamarque

- Coat of arms
- Location of Lamarque
- Location within France Location within Nouvelle-Aquitaine
- Coordinates: 45°05′49″N 0°43′00″W
- Country: France
- Region: Nouvelle-Aquitaine
- Department: Gironde
- Arrondissement: Lesparre-Médoc
- Canton: Le Sud-Médoc
- Intercommunality: Médoc Estuaire

Government
  - Mayor (2020–2026): Dominique Saint-Martin
- Area^{1}: 8.91 km^{2} (3.44 sq mi)
- Elevation: 6 m (20 ft)
- Highest elevation: 19 m (62 ft)
- Lowest elevation: 0 m (0 ft)
- Population (2023): 1,335
  - Density: 150/km^{2} (388/sq mi)
- Time zone: UTC+01:00 (CET)
  - Summer (DST): UTC+02:00 (CEST)
- INSEE/Postal code: 33220 /33460
- ^{1} French Land Register data, which excludes lakes, ponds, glaciers > 1 km^{2} (0.386 sq mi or 247 acres) and river estuaries.

Lamarque (French pronunciation: [lamaʁk]; Gascon: La Marca) is a commune in the Gironde department in Nouvelle-Aquitaine in southwestern France. It lies in the Médoc, on the left bank of the Gironde estuary. A small car ferry crosses the estuary to Blaye.

== Population ==
Historical population
Year	Pop.	±% p.a.
1968	742	—
1975	771	+0.55%
1982	810	+0.71%
1990	893	+1.23%
1999	954	+0.74%
2007	1,101	+1.81%
2012	1,235	+2.32%
2017	1,308	+1.16%
2023	1,335	+0.34%
Source: INSEE

== See also ==
- Communes of the Gironde department
