= Château Boyd-Cantenac =

Winery in the Bordeaux region of France

Coordinates: 45.0228°N 0.6560°W

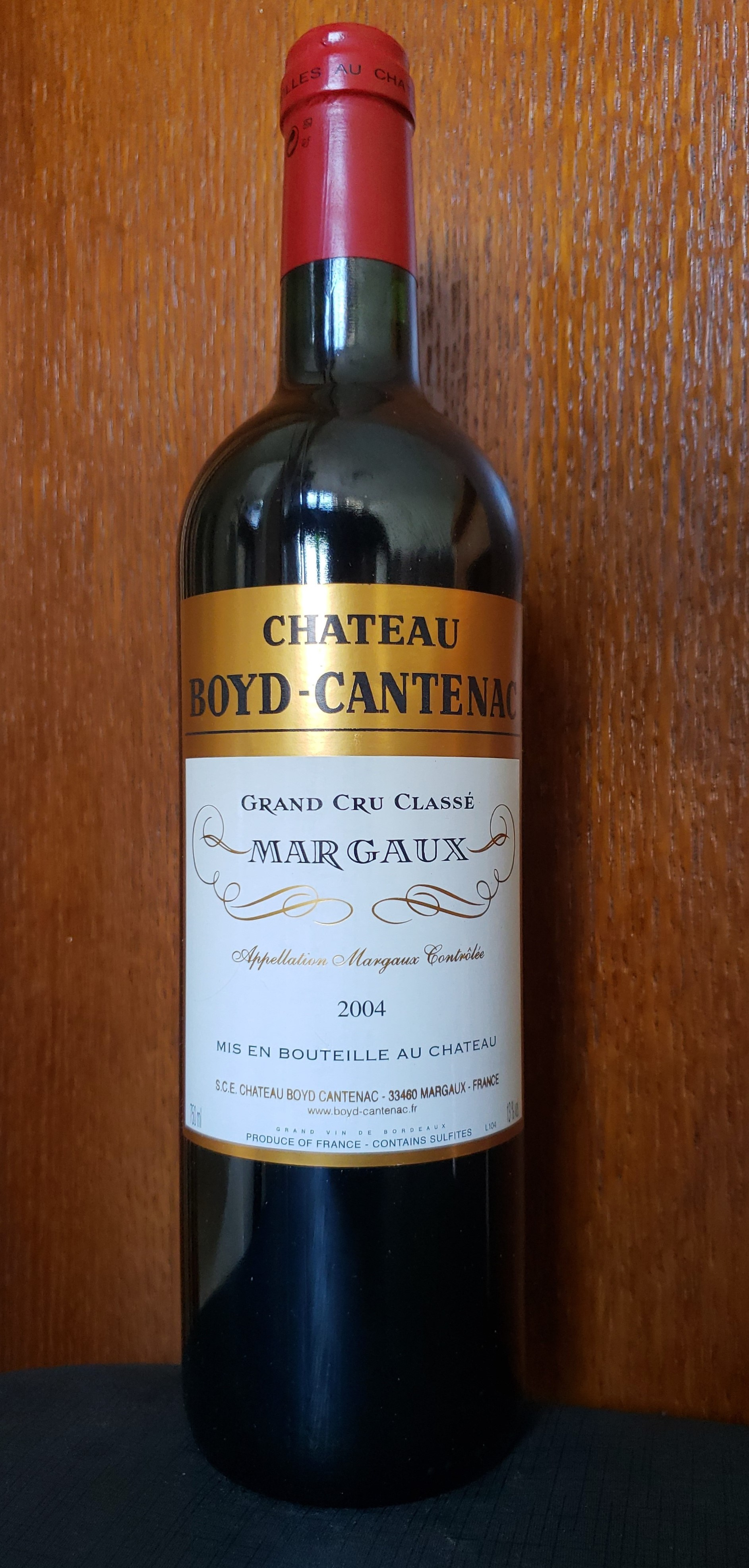
Grand Vin 2004

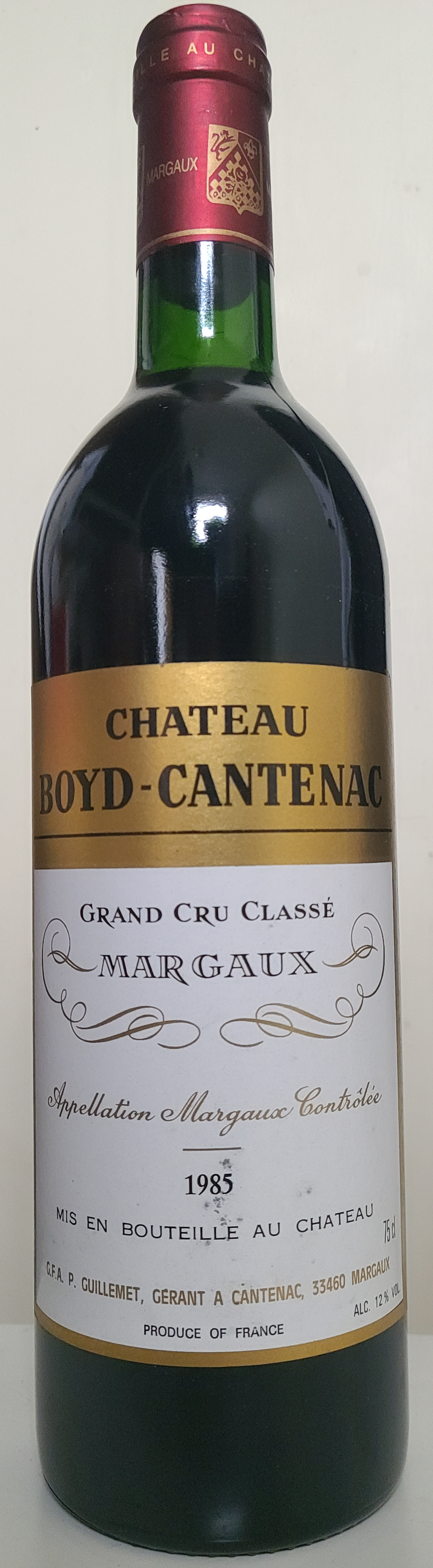
Grand Vin 1985

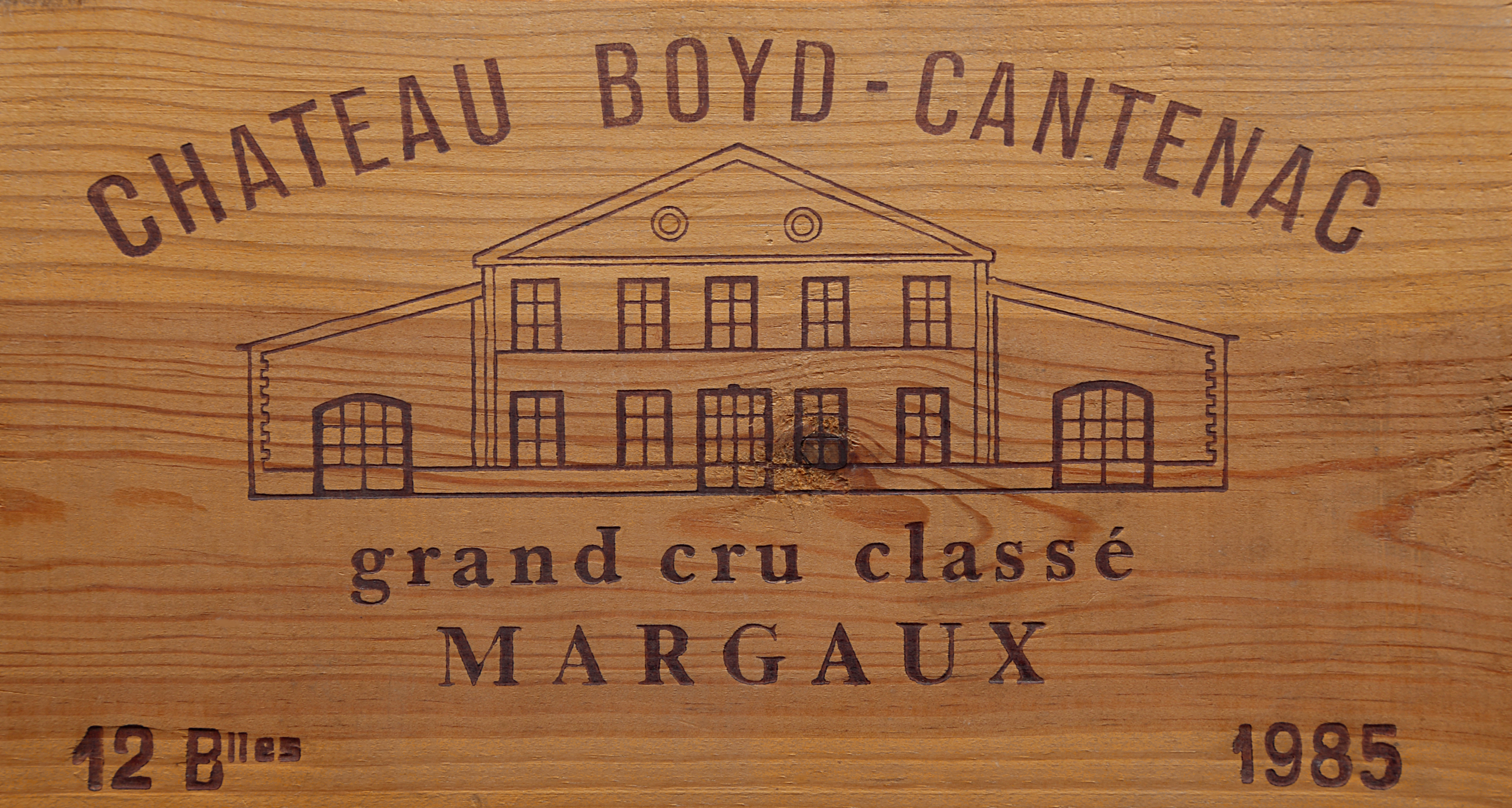

Château Boyd-Cantenac is a winery in the Margaux appellation of the Bordeaux region of France. The wine produced here was classified as one of fourteen Troisièmes Crus (Third Growths) in the historic Bordeaux Wine Official Classification of 1855. The vineyard, totalling 46 acres (190,000 m^{2}), is planted with Cabernet Sauvignon, Merlot, Cabernet Franc, and Petit Verdot and abuts other Margaux châteaux, including Château Brane-Cantenac and Château Kirwan. Producing annually 5,000-6,000 cases, Boyd Cantenac makes in addition to its Grand vin, a second wine under the labels Jacques Boyd and Josephine de Boyd.
