= Château Cantenac-Brown =

Winery in Bordeaux, France

Coordinates: 45.02780°N 0.67923°W

Château Cantenac Brown

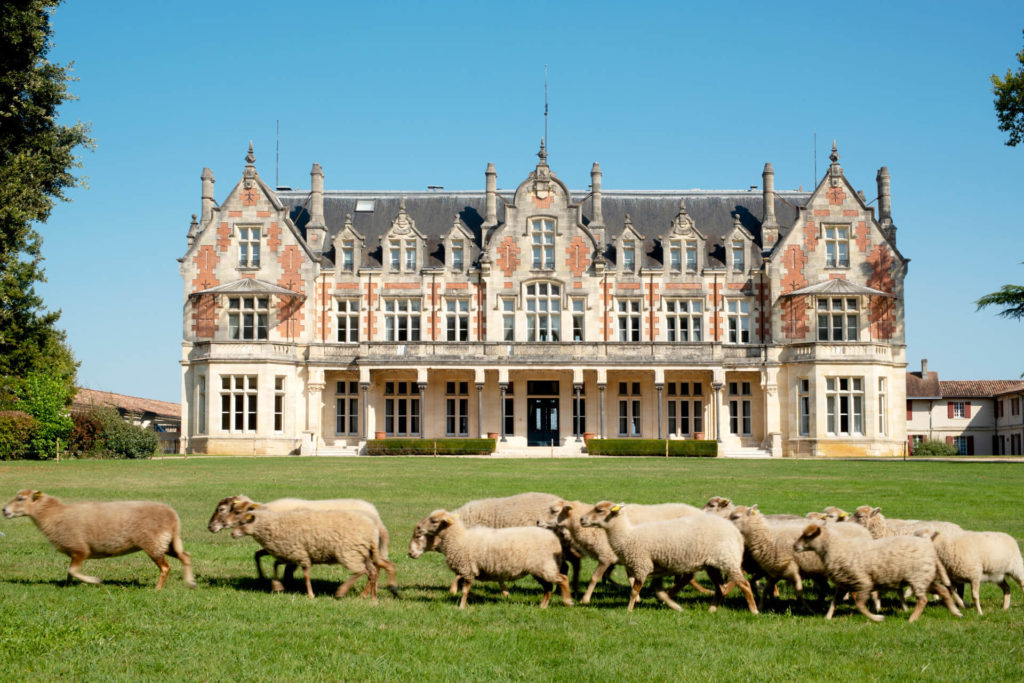
- Château Cantenac Brown
- Location: Cantenac, France
- Wine region: Médoc
- Appellation: Margaux
- Founded: 1754
- Area cultivated: 148
- Known for: Chateau Cantenac Brown Grand Cru
- Varietals: 65% Cabernet Sauvignon, 30% Merlot, 5% Cabernet Franc
- Other products: BriO de Cantenac brown (second wine), Alto de Cantenac Brown (white wine)
- Website: https://www.cantenacbrown.com/en/

Château Cantenac Brown is a winery located in Cantenac in the Bordeaux region of France. As a wine of the Margaux appellation, it was classified as one of fourteen Third Growths (Troisièmes Crus) in the historic Bordeaux Wine Official Classification of 1855. The Château has 148 acres (60 ha) planted with Cabernet Sauvignon, Merlot and Cabernet Franc. The Château produces a second wine "BriO de Cantenac Brown" and a white wine "AltO de Cantenac Brown".

== History of the Estate ==
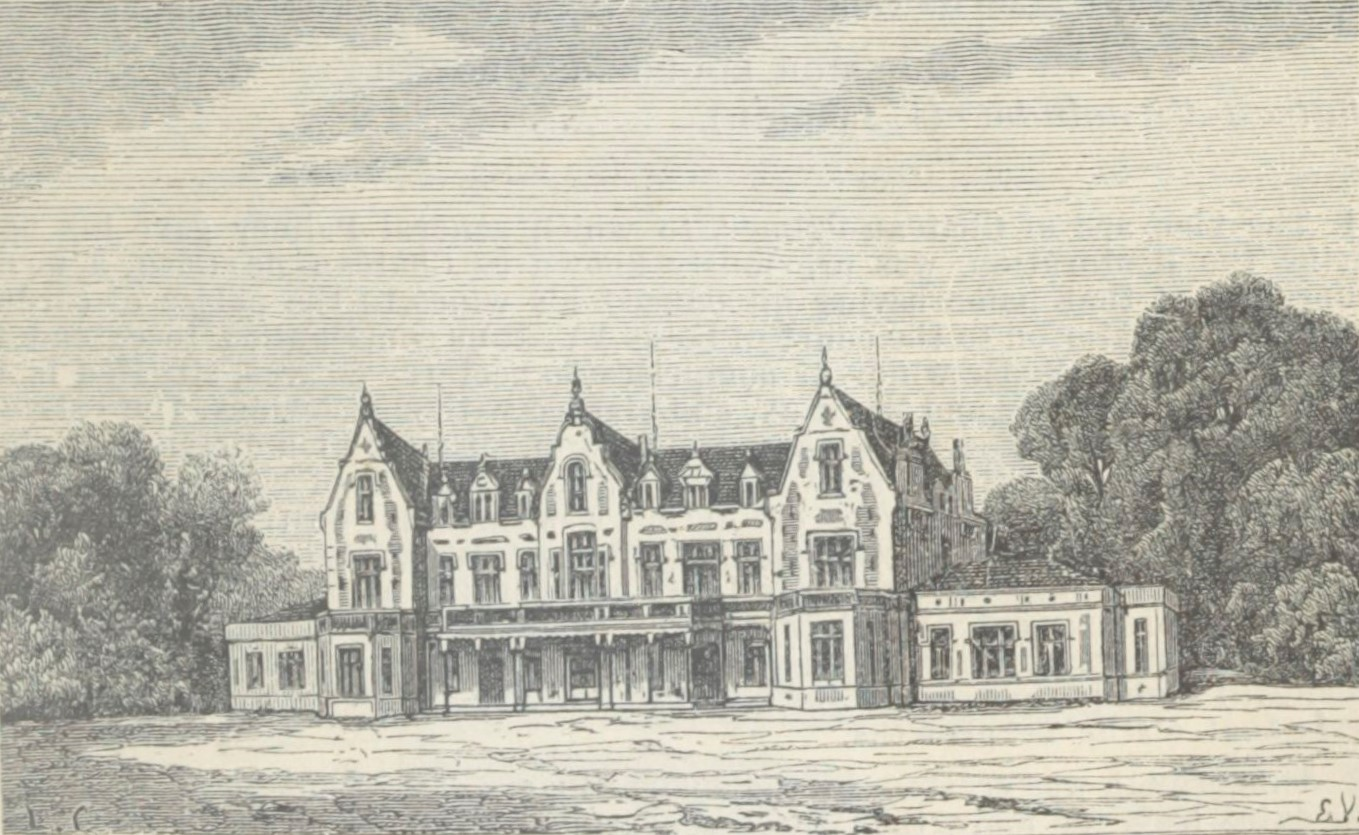
Châteaux Cantenac Brown in 1898

In 1806, John Lewis Brown – a Frenchman of Scottish origins – established the vineyard and gave his name to the estate. His hard work was rewarded in 1855 when the Bordeaux Classification ranked Cantenac Brown among the most esteemed wineyards. Team spirit ran strong in the veins of John Lewis Brown who belonged to Clan Broun of Colstoun, whose motto is “Floreat Majestas” (“Let majesty flourish”), hinting at a link with nature.

His grandson, John Lewis Brown – a famous naturalist painter – spent his childhood at the Château and was inspired by these lands, which he depicted and shared with his friends Degas, Manet, Pissarro and Toulouse-Lautrec.

An important testimony to its Scottish ancestry is the estate’s emblematic Tudor-style château which makes it a remarkable property in the Médoc region.

José Sanfins is inextricably linked with the estate’s modern history. He arrived as a trainee on the property in 1989 and became the manager in 1998. From his childhood on an island in the Gironde estuary, José Sanfins has inherited from his childhood the value of working the land and a respect for nature. He instilled the reasoned approach and more attentive to the nature associated with the estate.

In 2019, Cantenac Brown changed hands and is now managed by the French family Le Lous. Tristan Le Lous is an agronomist with a passion for oenology, he is very involved in managing the estate. Tristan Le Lous -born of a family based in Burgundy- discovered Bordeaux when he met his future wife who introduced him to the region’s wines. On the estate, the meeting of Tristan Le Lous and José Sanfins was a pivotal milestone.

In 2020, major investments were made to ensure that operations are in line with the eco-responsible requirements and a reasoned approach. The project of an eco-responsible cellar designed by the architect Philippe Madec – a pioneer and advocate of eco-construction – was announced. The environmental quality standards and technical excellence are set at high level : it will be built with only raw earth and solid wood, both being untreated, natural and biosourced materials from the Aquitaine region. The walls of the cellar will be built using the ancestral technique of rammed earth construction : the raw earth will be compressed directly at the château to form the walls. This technique will guarantee thermal inertia and humidity for the aging of the wine without the need for air conditioning. The vat room will be composed of several small vats to allow better precision during blending. The project will be integrated into the existing buildings. Delivery of the cellar is scheduled for the 2023 harvest.

== Terroir ==
Since 1996, José Sanfins has been applying the principles of sustainable viticulture. Sustainable principles are key elements on the property where the use of chemical fertilisers has been dramatically reduced over the last twenty years. Vine work is carried out by hand.

The château is located on stony land in the south of Margaux on a gravelly soil typical of the Médoc allowing good drainage.

The vineyard covers 148 acres (60 ha) and is composed of 65% Cabernet Sauvignon, 30% Merlot and 5% Cabernet Franc which give wines an intense bouquet, favorable for aging. The average age of the vines is 35 years old.

== Wines ==
The estate produces three wines:

• Château Cantenac Brown, 1855-classified Grand Cru, Margaux, ages in French oak barrels.

• "BriO de Cantenac Brown", the second wine, Margaux, ages in French oak barrels.

• "AltO de Cantenac Brown", the white wine, Bordeaux. It is made from a vineyard of 4.5 acres (1.8 ha); composed of 90% Sauvignon Blanc and 10% Sémillon.
