= Salaunes =

- Commune
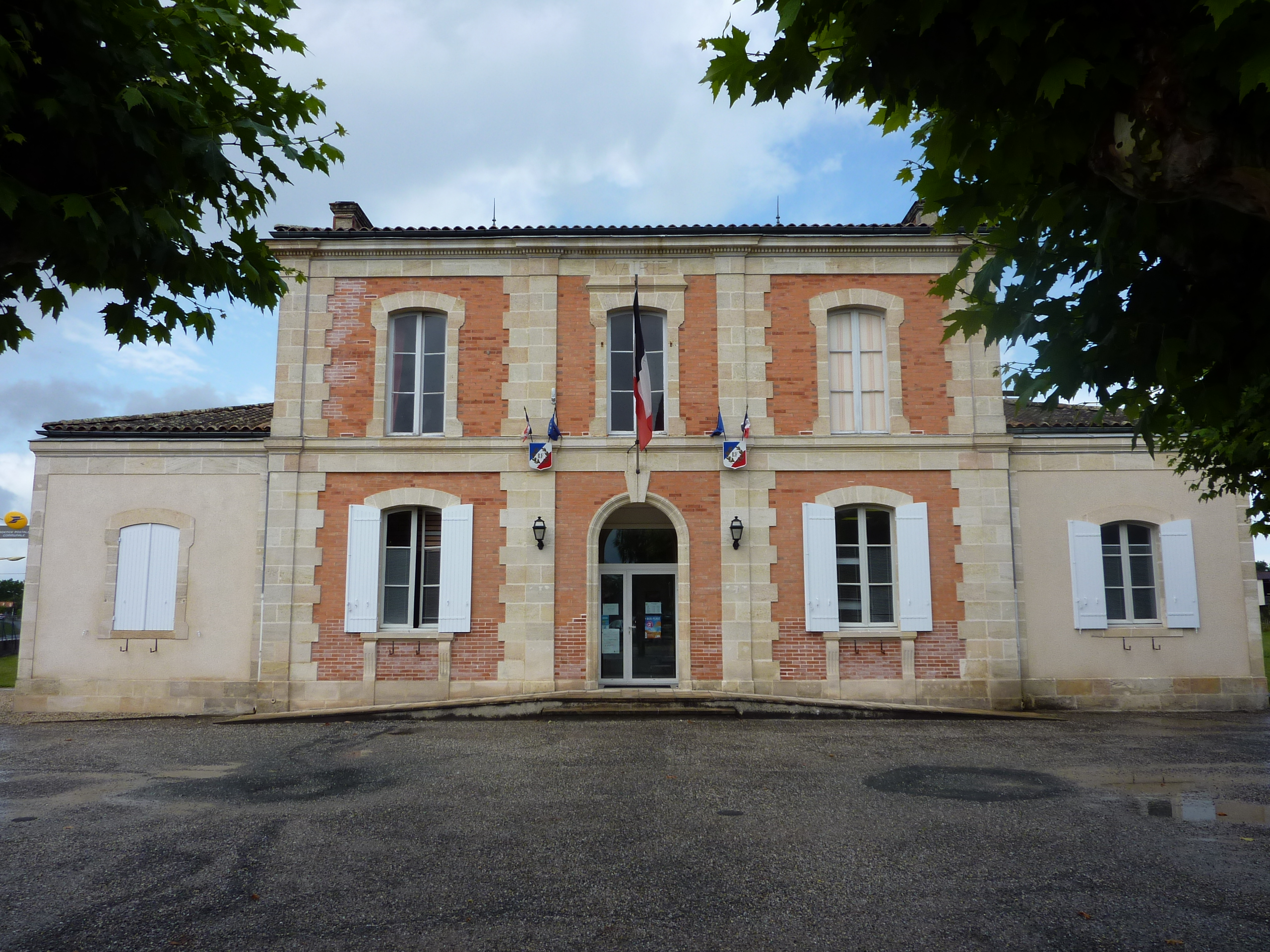
- The town hall in Salaunes
- Location of Salaunes
- Location within France Location within Nouvelle-Aquitaine
- Coordinates: 44°56′14″N 0°49′45″W
- Country: France
- Region: Nouvelle-Aquitaine
- Department: Gironde
- Arrondissement: Lesparre-Médoc
- Canton: Le Sud-Médoc
- Intercommunality: Médulienne

Government
  - Mayor (2023–2026): Damien Hoareau
- Area^{1}: 42.64 km^{2} (16.46 sq mi)
- Elevation: 49 m (161 ft)
- Highest elevation: 51 m (167 ft)
- Lowest elevation: 41 m (135 ft)
- Population (2023): 1,260
  - Density: 29.5/km^{2} (76.5/sq mi)
- Time zone: UTC+01:00 (CET)
  - Summer (DST): UTC+02:00 (CEST)
- INSEE/Postal code: 33494 /33160
- ^{1} French Land Register data, which excludes lakes, ponds, glaciers > 1 km^{2} (0.386 sq mi or 247 acres) and river estuaries.

Salaunes (French pronunciation: [salɔn]; Occitan: Salaunas) is a commune in the Gironde department in Nouvelle-Aquitaine in southwestern France.

== Population ==
Historical population
Year	Pop.	±% p.a.
1968	342	—
1975	397	+2.15%
1982	579	+5.54%
1990	561	−0.39%
1999	571	+0.20%
2007	682	+2.25%
2012	837	+4.18%
2017	1,066	+4.96%
2023	1,260	+2.83%
Source: INSEE

== See also ==
- Communes of the Gironde department
