= Cruse family =

The Cruse family is a well-known French Protestant wine-merchant family from the Bordeaux region of France. Family members also own several renowned wine estates.

== History ==
In 1815 Herman Cruse, a Danish–German merchant from Segeberg, now in Germany but then part of the Duchy of Holstein under the Danish Crown, settled in the Bordeaux region of France, where he co-founded the firm Cruse et Hirschfeld in 1819. With financial support of his wife, he cornered the Bordeaux market in 1847; that year's harvest turned out to be excellent, and he made a fortune. In 1850, the firm Cruse et Hirschfeld came under the sole control of the Cruse family and was renamed to Cruse et Fils Frères. Cruse developed the firm with the help of his three sons to one of the major wine-trading companies in Bordeaux.

== Wine estates ==
Next to the flourishing wine-shipping business, Herman Cruse set out to diversify and invest in wine-growing estates.

=== Château Laujac ===
The first winery acquired by Herman Cruse, in 1852, was Château Laujac in Bégadan, Gironde, in the heart of the Médoc area. The estate has remained in the hands of the Cruse family since; from 1962 it was managed by Herman's great-great-grandson Bernard Cruse, as is the adjacent estate of Château Laffitte Laujac.

=== Château Pontet-Canet ===
Label of a 1970 bottle of Château Pontet-Canet

In 1865, Herman Cruse purchased Château Pontet-Canet, a renowned wine estate that had seen better times. He quickly modernized the facilities at Pontet-Canet and built a subterranean wine cellar. The wine was not bottled at the estate, and sold in large quantities without vintage label to the French railways company.

In 1973, the Cruse family lost Château Pontet-Canet when a wine fraud was discovered in which cheap table wine was turned into expensive red Bordeaux by falsifying the records. The ensuing scandal forced Cruse to sell the estate in 1975 to Cognac merchant Guy Tesseron, owner of Château Lafon-Rochet.

=== Château d'Issan ===
Emmanuel Henri Georges Cruse (1892 - 1968) purchased the Château d'Issan winery in 1945. There was much work to be done, including replanting the vineyards and re-equipping the dilapidated cellars, work which was duly undertaken; it was some time before the château received its long-overdue restoration.

In 1998, the grandson of Emmanuel Cruse, also named Emmanuel Cruse, became proprietor at the young age of 30. Under his proprietorship, the Cruse family still owns the property today, with Eric Pellon working as general manager. The effort and expenditure they have poured into Château d'Issan over the ensuing decades may be paying off, as some recent vintages have produced top quality wines.

==== Emmanuel Cruse ====
Emmanuel Cruse (b. April 7, 1968) is a winemaker, since 2008 Grand Maître of the Commanderie du Bontemps de Médoc, Graves, Sauternes et Barsac, and since 2010 also President of the Grand Conseil du Vin de Bordeaux as well as Grand Maître of the Commanderie de Bordeaux worldwide.

=== Château Corbin ===
Annabelle Cruse-Bardinet manages the 15th-century Château Corbin in Saint-Émilion, which she and her two sisters, the children of Bernard Cruse of Château Laujac, bought in 1999. This is one of only a few examples of women owning a winery in Bordeaux. Château Corbin is a grand cru classé Saint-Emilion.

=== Other estates ===
Other famous châteaux owned at some time by members of the Cruse family include Château la Dame Blanche, Château Haut-Bages-Libéral, Château Giscours, and Château Rauzan-Ségla.
