= Arcins =

- Commune
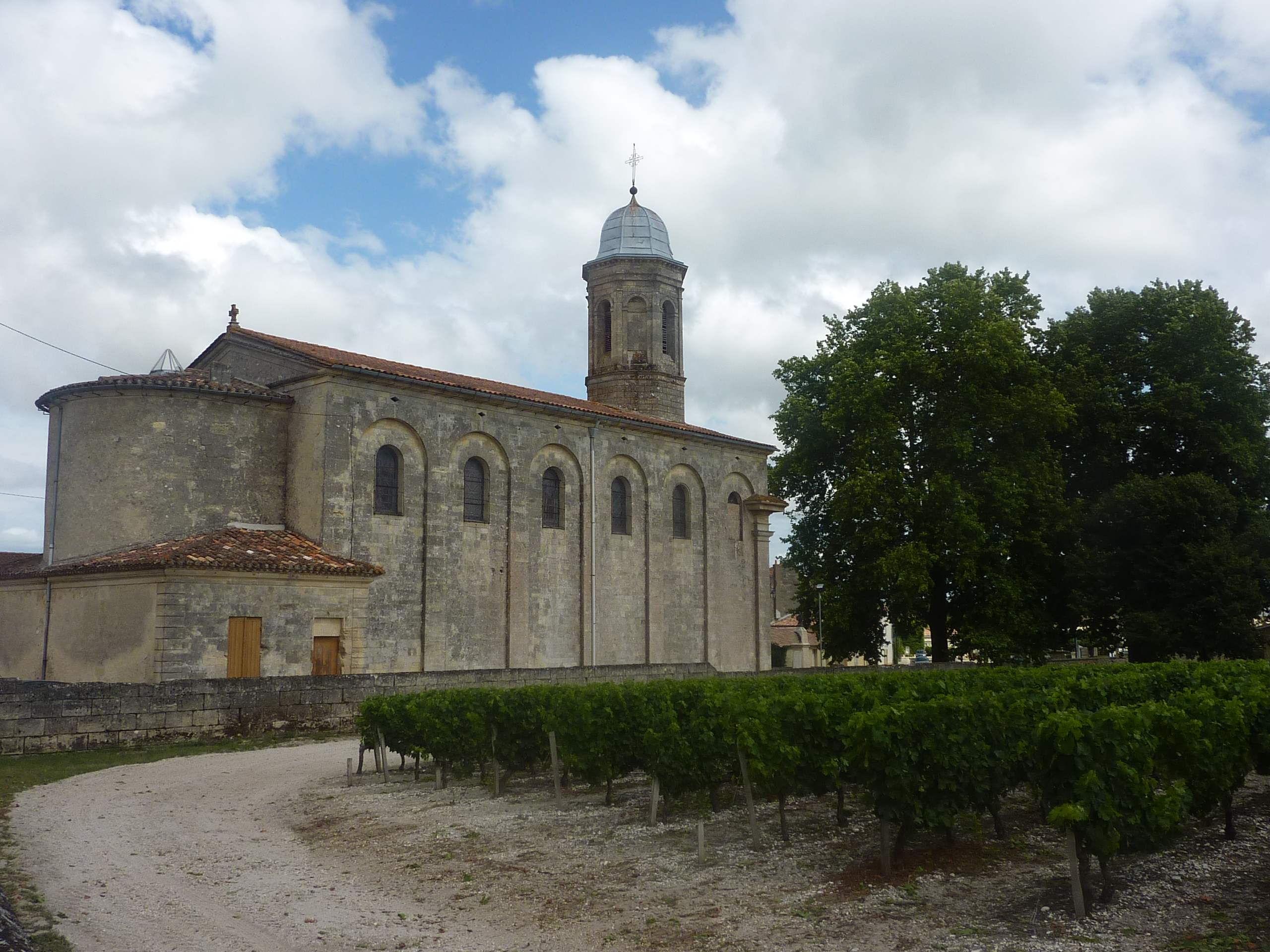
- The church in Arcins
- Location of Arcins
- Location within France Location within Nouvelle-Aquitaine
- Coordinates: 45°04′26″N 0°43′25″W
- Country: France
- Region: Nouvelle-Aquitaine
- Department: Gironde
- Arrondissement: Lesparre-Médoc
- Canton: Le Sud-Médoc
- Intercommunality: Médoc Estuaire

Government
  - Mayor (2020–2026): Claude Ganelon
- Area^{1}: 6.77 km^{2} (2.61 sq mi)
- Elevation: 10 m (33 ft)
- Highest elevation: 18 m (59 ft)
- Lowest elevation: 1 m (3.3 ft)
- Population (2023): 540
  - Density: 80/km^{2} (210/sq mi)
- Time zone: UTC+01:00 (CET)
  - Summer (DST): UTC+02:00 (CEST)
- INSEE/Postal code: 33010 /33460
- ^{1} French Land Register data, which excludes lakes, ponds, glaciers > 1 km^{2} (0.386 sq mi or 247 acres) and river estuaries.

Arcins (Occitan: Arsin) is a commune in the Gironde department in southwestern France.

== Population ==
Historical population
Year	Pop.	±% p.a.
1968	242	—
1975	291	+2.67%
1982	302	+0.53%
1990	304	+0.08%
1999	304	+0.00%
2007	380	+2.83%
2012	439	+2.93%
2017	490	+2.22%
2023	540	+1.63%
Source: INSEE

== See also ==
- Communes of the Gironde department
