= Château d'Issan =

Bordeaux winery

Coordinates: 45.0379°N 0.6581°W

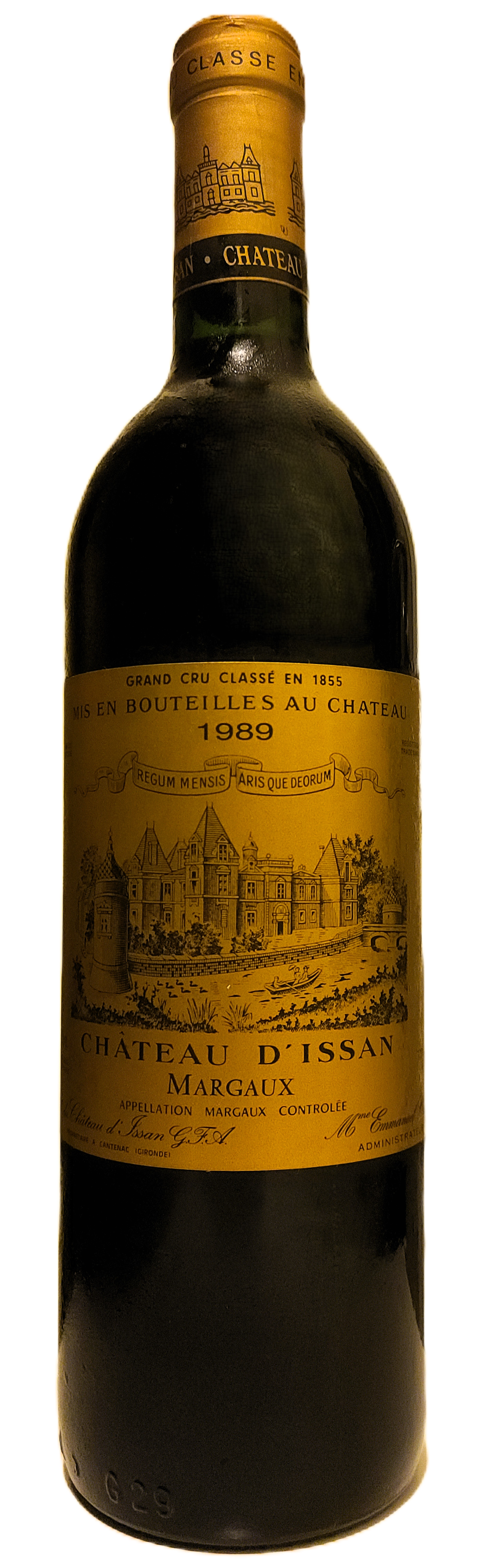
Grand Vin 1989

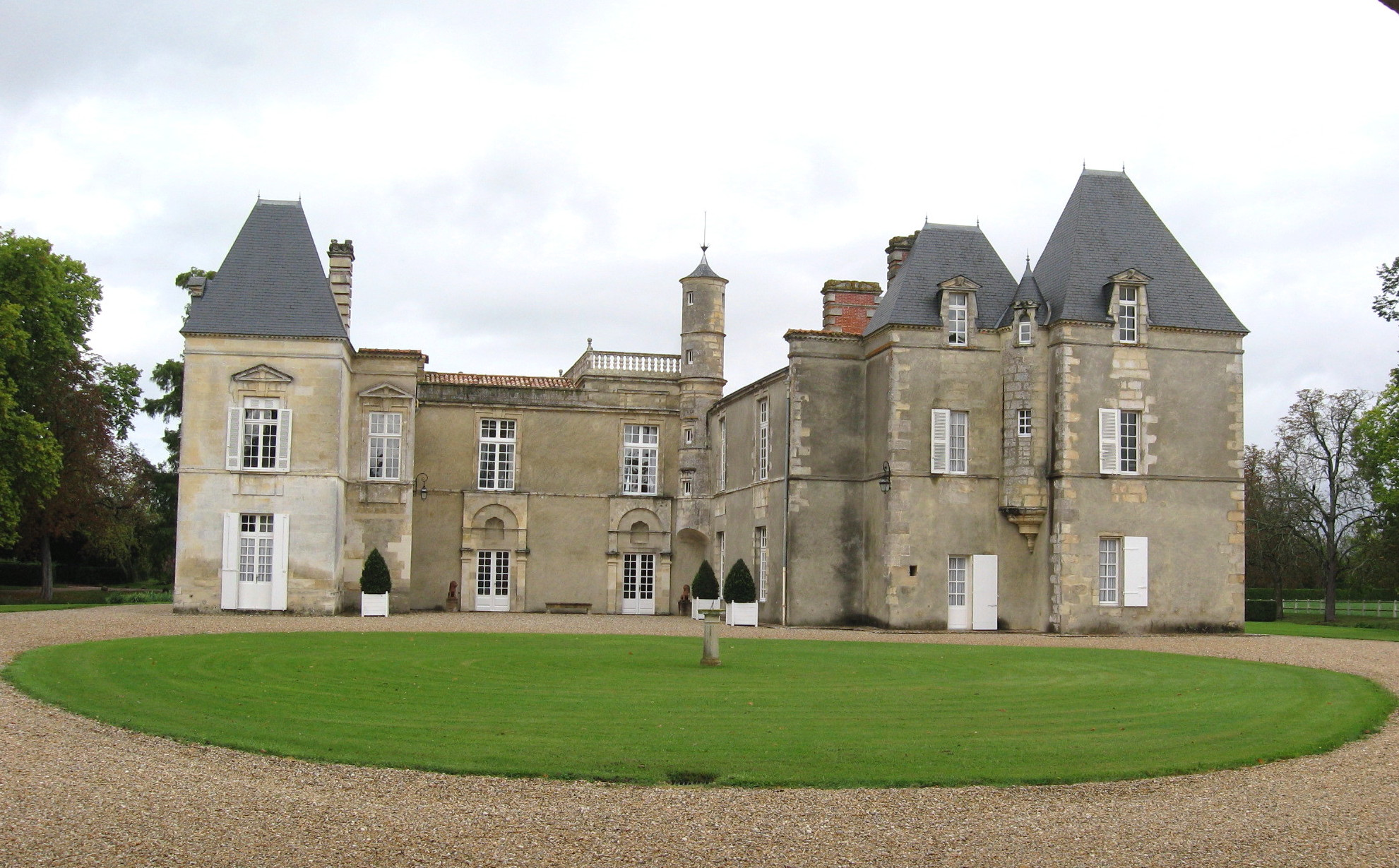
Château d'Issan

Château d'Issan is a castle and winery in the Margaux appellation of the Bordeaux region of France. The wine produced here was classified as one of fourteen Troisièmes Crus (Third Growths) in the historic Bordeaux Wine Official Classification of 1855. The winery is under the proprietorship of Emmanuel Cruse, of the Cruse family. In February 2013, 50% of the estate was purchased by Jacky Lorenzetti, who also owns Château Pédesclaux in Pauillac & Chateau Lilian Ladouys in Saint-Estèphe.

In the past, Gustave Emmanuel Roy was one of the owners.

== Production ==
The vineyard abuts other Margaux châteaux, including Château Palmer and Château Margaux itself, in separate lots totalling 41 hectares (100 acres). The grape varieties cultivated are 62% Cabernet Sauvignon, 38% Merlot.

Producing annually 6,000 cases of the Grand vin, d'Issan also makes a second wine under the label Blason d’Issan.
