= Paul Cupido =

Dutch photographer

Paul Cupido (born 1972) is a Dutch fine art photographer. His work revolves around the Japanese principle of mu. Cupido was born and grew up on the Dutch island of Terschelling.

== Publications ==
=== Books by Cupido ===
- Searching for Mu. Netherlands: self-published, 2017. OCLC 1059465724. With some text by Taco Hidde Bakker. Edition of 200 copies. Artist book.
- Continuum. Zurich: Bildhalle, 2019. ISBN 9783952506615. Edition of 300 copies. Artist book.
- Ephémère. 2019. ISBN 9783952506622. Edition of 800 copies. A retrospective.
- Amazônia. Amsterdam: Alauda, 2019. ISBN 978-9082396645. With an essay by Hugo Fernando Salinas Fortes junior. Edition of 750 copies.
- Mukayu. (M)éditions; Ibasho Gallery, 2020. With an introduction by Taco Hidde Bakker. Edition of 500 copies.
- 4 a.m. Netherlands: self-published, 2021. Edition of 500 copies. Artist book.
- SÉLÉNÉ. Netherlands: coproduction with Château Palmer - Leica, 2023. ISBN 978-2350466026. In collaboration with poet Ryoko Sekiguchi. Edition of 800 copies. Artist book.

=== Books with contributions by Cupido ===
- New Dutch Photography Talent 2018. Amsterdam: Gup, 2017. ISBN 9789082483352.
