= Château Pouget =

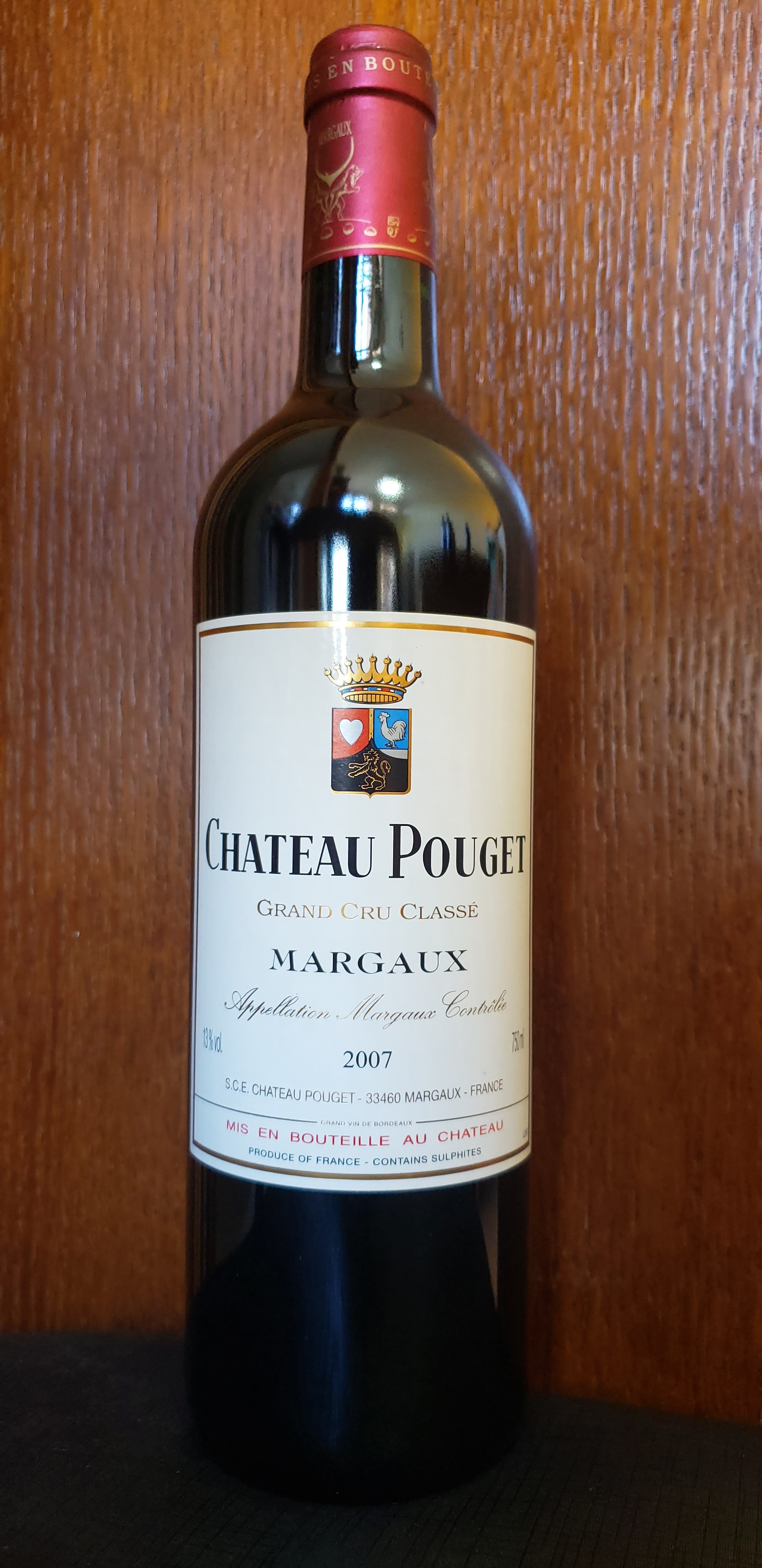
A bottle from 2007 vintage

Château Pouget is a winery in the Margaux appellation of the Bordeaux region of France. The wine produced here was classified as one of ten Quatrièmes Crus (Fourth Growths) in the historic Bordeaux Wine Official Classification of 1855.

François-Antoine Pouget inherited Château Pouget in 1748. His daughter Claire married Pierre-Antoine de Chavailles in 1771. Over one and a half centuries, the Pouget de Chavailles family was in charge of Château Pouget. They had sometimes to face difficulties, as when, during the French Revolution, their properties were requisitioned, but they also met with great success, as Château Pouget was classified as a fourth Cru Classé in 1855. The château itself used to be a cellar, its front portion was turned into a house during the second half of the 19th century. Two marble medaillons on the frontage of the house commemorate the different classifications of Château Pouget.
