= Charles Cameron Ludington =

American historian

Charles Cameron Ludington FRHS is Visiting Associate Professor of Food Studies at New York University and formerly was Teaching Associate Professor at North Carolina State University. He specialises in the history of the wine industry in Britain, Ireland, and France.

== Early life ==
Ludington received his BA from Yale University and his MA, MPhil and PhD from Columbia University.

== Career ==
Ludington was elected a fellow of the Royal Historical Society in 2014.

He was a Marie Curie Senior Research Fellow at University College Cork and Universite de Bordeaux-Michel Montaigne from 2015–17.

== Involvement in the Brett Kavanaugh investigation ==
On September 30, 2018, Ludington released a statement concerning his undergraduate experiences with Yale College classmate and then Supreme Court nominee Judge Brett Kavanaugh. In it, Ludington claimed Kavanaugh had not accurately represented his drinking habits or temperament under the influence while testifying under oath before the United States Senate Judiciary Committee. As part of a supplemental FBI investigation on Kavanaugh, Ludington was then contacted to speak with investigators.

== Selected publications ==
=== Books ===
- The Politics of Wine in Britain: A New Cultural History. 2013.
- A Long Shadow: The Story of an Ulster-Irish Family. CreateSpace, 2017.

=== Articles and chapters ===
- “The Possible Origins of the Runnette Family of Sessiamagaroll,” Duiche Neill, IV (Dungannon, Tyrone, 1990), 133–44.
- “Huguenots in Benburb?: The Possible Origins of the Runnettes of Sessiamagaroll, Part II” Duiche Neill, VI (Dungannon, Tyrone, 1991), 52–74.
- “Between Myth and Margin: The Huguenots in Irish History,” Historical Research, 73:181 (February 2000), 1-19.
- “From Ancient Constitution to British Empire: William Atwood and the Imperial Crown of England,” in Jane Ohlmeyer, ed. Political Thought in Seventeenth-Century Ireland (Cambridge: Cambridge University Press, 2000), 244–70.
- “The Huguenot Diaspora: Refugee Networks of Power,” in Hiram Morgan, ed. Information, Media and Power through the Ages (Cork: Irish Academic Press, 2001), 84-95
- “‘Be sometimes to your country true’: The politics of wine in England, 1660–1714,” in Adam Smyth, ed., A Pleasing Sinne: Drink and Conviviality in Early Modern England (Woodbridge, Suffolk: Boydell and Brewer, 2004), 89-106.
- “A good and most particular taste: The consumption and meaning of luxury claret in early-eighteenth century England, 1702-1730s” in A. Lynn Martin and Barbara Santich, eds., Culinary History (Brompton: East Street, 2004), 77–86.
- “To the king o’er the water”: Scottishness and claret, c. 1660–1763,” in Mack Holt, ed., Alcohol: A Social and Cultural History (Oxford: Berg Press, 2006), 164-84.
- “‘Claret is the Liquor for boys: Port for Men’: How Port Became the Englishman's Wine, c. 1750–1800,” Journal of British Studies 48:2 (April, 2009), 364-90.
- “Drinking for Approval: Wine and the British Court from George III to Victoria and Albert,” in Danielle de Vooght, ed., Royal Taste (Farnham: Ashgate, 2011), 57–86.
- “The Politics of Wine in Eighteenth-Century England,” History Today 63:7 (July 2013), cover and 42–48.
- “United Kingdom: Taxes, Prejudices, and a Volatile Love of Wine,” in Kym Anderson and Vicente Pinilla, eds., Wine's Evolving Globalization: Comparative Histories of the Old and New Worlds (Cambridge: Cambridge University Press, 2018)
