= Château Kirwan =

Winery in the Bordeaux region of France

Coordinates: 45.02742°N 0.65816°W

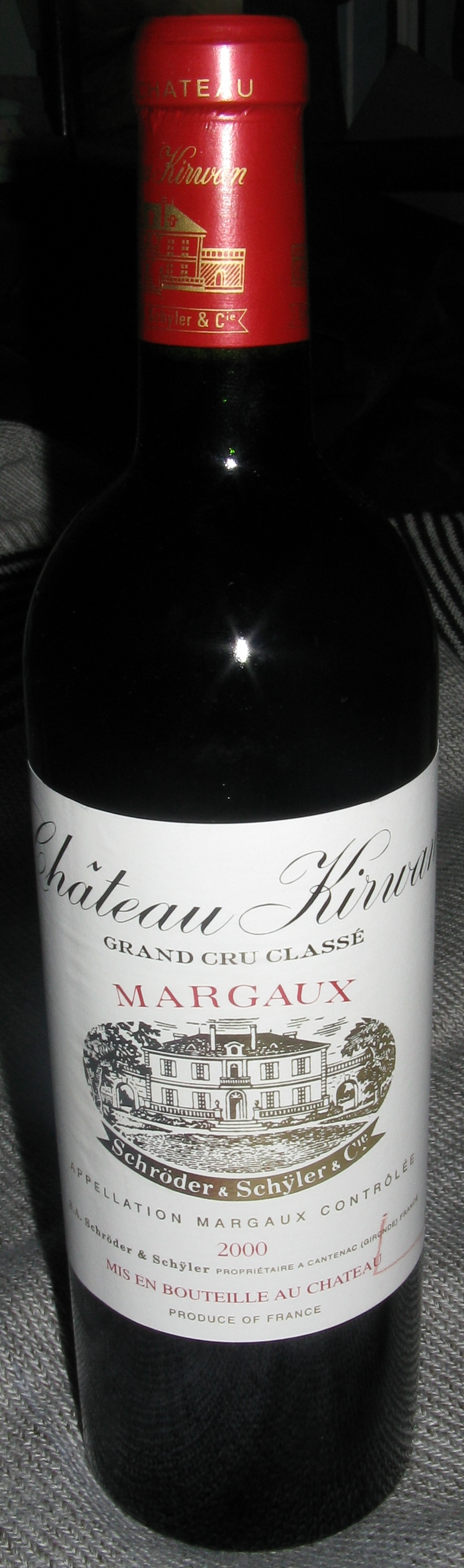
Grand vin 2000

Château Kirwan is a winery in the Margaux appellation of the Bordeaux region of France. The wine produced here was classified as one of fourteen Troisièmes Crus (Third Growths) in the historic Bordeaux Wine Official Classification of 1855.

Its second wine is Les Charmes de Kirwan. From 2023, Château Kirwan will also produce a white wine known as Château Kirwan Margalais. Unusually for a white wine produced in Bordeaux, the Margalais shall be produced using 100% Chardonnay grapes.

== History ==
This winemaker, in particular, takes its name from Mark Kirwan, who bought two adjoining vineyards in the late 18th century. The Kirwan family were one of the Tribes of Galway and was one of several Irish business owners who moved to Bordeaux during this period. Their influence was not inconsiderable, with wine historian and academic Charles Ludington suggesting that Irish merchants were responsible for popularising Bordeaux drinking of the style and taste that is seen today.

There were two ownership changes that took place in the late 19th and early 20th centuries. The more important of these took place in 1926, when the Godard family sold Château Kirwan to Schröder & Schÿler (a longstanding Négociant and winetrading house, whose roots in Bordeaux were also centuries-old). Under the stewardship of Jean-Henri Schÿler, significant investment was made into the quality of the vines, resulting in a replanting initiative which spanned the 1960s and the 1970s. The Schÿler family has retained ownership of Chateau Kirwan to the present day, Yann Schÿler took ownership in 2016 after the death of his father Jean-Henri Schÿler, with Philippe Delfaut serving as the managing director since 2007.

== Vineyards ==
Château Kirwan has 38 hectares (94 acres) of vineyards, planted to 47% Cabernet Sauvignon, 35% Merlot, 9% Cabernet Franc, 7% Petit Verdot and 2% Chardonnay.
