= Margaux-Cantenac =

- Commune
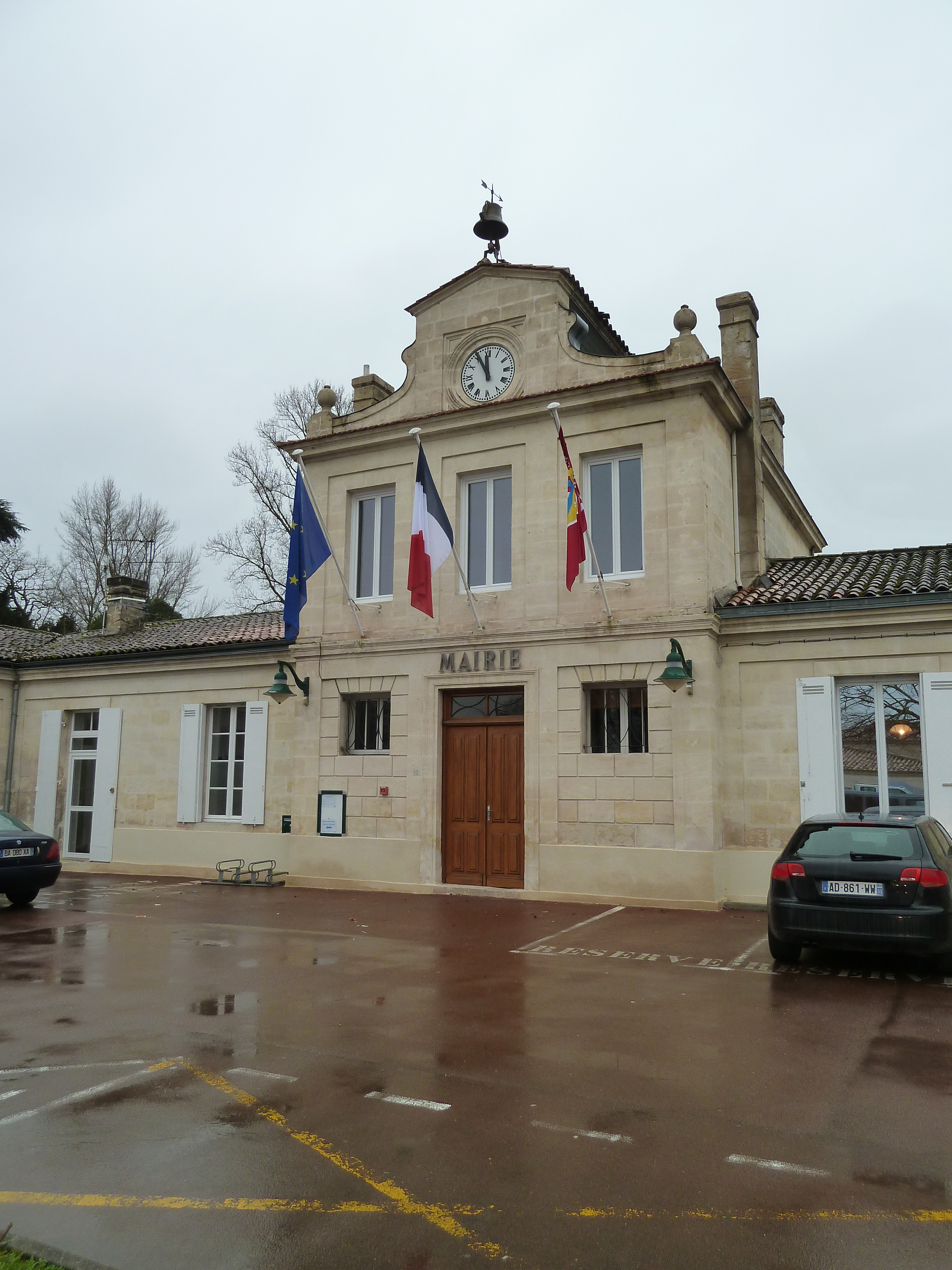
- The town hall in Margaux
- Location of Margaux-Cantenac
- Location within France Location within Nouvelle-Aquitaine
- Coordinates: 45°02′31″N 0°40′34″W
- Country: France
- Region: Nouvelle-Aquitaine
- Department: Gironde
- Arrondissement: Lesparre-Médoc
- Canton: Le Sud-Médoc
- Intercommunality: Médoc Estuaire

Government
  - Mayor (2020–2026): Sophie Martin
- Area^{1}: 21.62 km^{2} (8.35 sq mi)
- Population (2023): 2,845
  - Density: 131.6/km^{2} (340.8/sq mi)
- Time zone: UTC+01:00 (CET)
  - Summer (DST): UTC+02:00 (CEST)
- INSEE/Postal code: 33268 /33460
- ^{1} French Land Register data, which excludes lakes, ponds, glaciers > 1 km^{2} (0.386 sq mi or 247 acres) and river estuaries.

Margaux-Cantenac (French pronunciation: [maʁɡo kɑ̃tnak]; Gascon: Margaus e Cantenac) is a commune in the department of Gironde, southwestern France. The municipality was established on 1 January 2017 by merger of the former communes of Margaux (the seat) and Cantenac.

== Population ==
Population data refer to the commune in its geography as of January 2025.

Historical population
Year	Pop.	±% p.a.
1968	2,520	—
1975	2,545	+0.14%
1982	2,660	+0.63%
1990	2,584	−0.36%
1999	2,517	−0.29%
2007	2,682	+0.80%
2012	2,867	+1.34%
2017	2,965	+0.67%
2023	2,845	−0.69%
Source: INSEE

== See also ==
- Communes of the Gironde department
