= Smith (artist) =

French artist (born 1985)

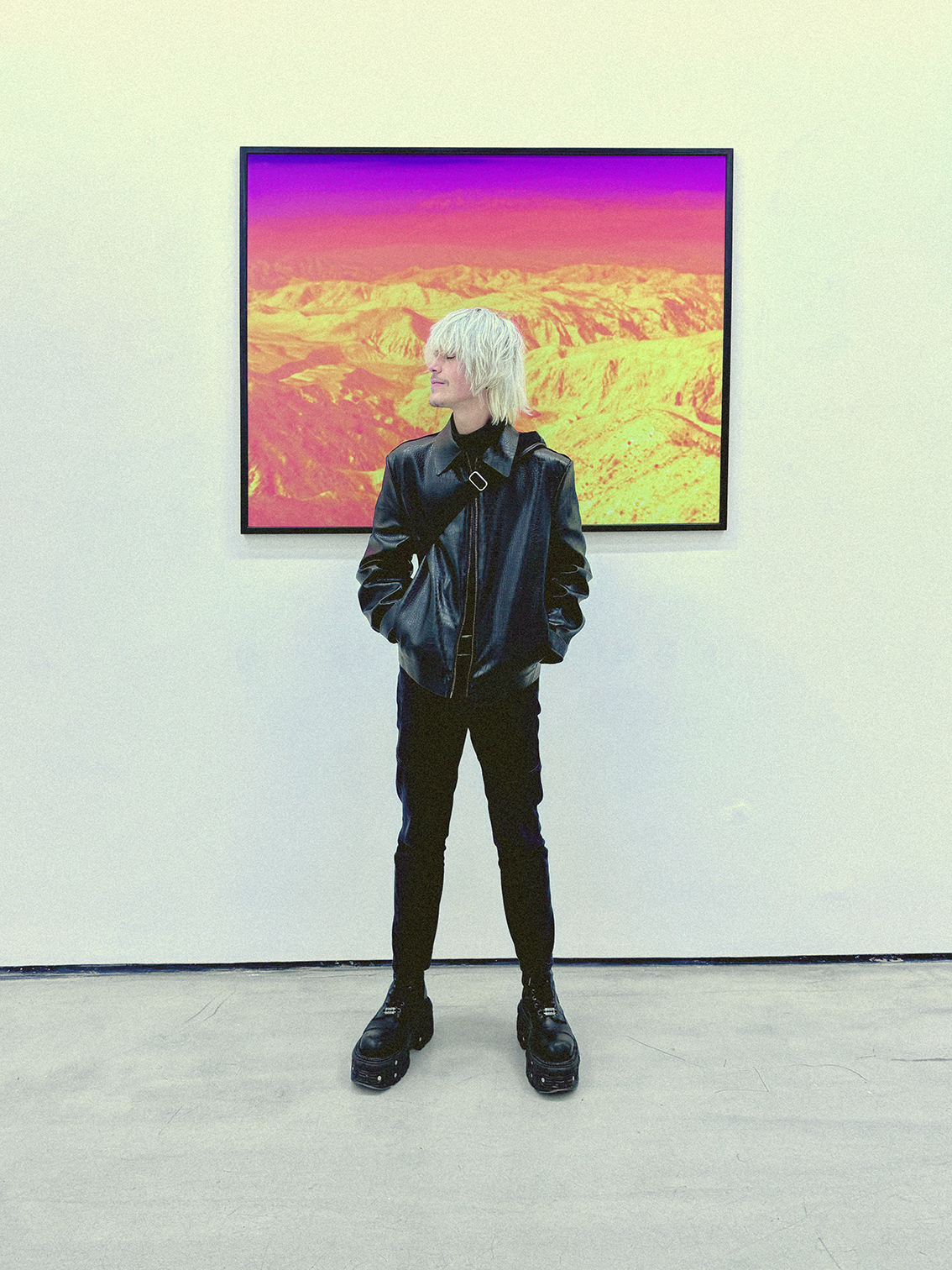
- Born: 1985 (age 40–41); Paris, France
- Education: Sorbonne Université, Ecole Nationale Supérieure de la Photographie, Le Fresnoy - Studio National des Arts Contemporains, Université du Québec à Montréal
- Occupations: Photographer, Director, Visual Artist
- Notable work: Désidération, Dami, TRAUM, Saturnium, Spectrographies, Löyly
- Title: Dr
- Website: smith.pictures

Smith (stylized as SMITH; born 1985) is a French transdisciplinary artist-researcher. Smith experiments with and explores the links between contemporary humanity and its boundary figures – ghosts, mutants, hybrids – engaging his own body and that of his collaborators – writers, astronauts, shamans, engineers, designers, performers or composers – in indisciplinary projects. Disturbing genres, languages and disciplines, Smith proposes curious works, in the etymological sense of cura: curiosity and care for the world around us, the terrestrial and the celestial, the human and the non-human, the visible and the invisible, imagination and fiction. Thermal cameras, drones, neon lights, implantations of electronic chips and subcutaneous meteorites, atomic mutations or trance practices characterise his fluid work composed with technological and spiritual means that incorporate the dimensions of mystery and dream.

== Early life and education ==
Born in 1985 in Paris, France. Smith has a degree in 2010 from the National School of Photography, Arles. Smith has also studied at the Paris-Sorbonne University (2007), and the Aalto University (2009) in Helsinki. He graduated from Le Fresnoy (National Studio of Contemporary Arts) in Tourcoing, France in 2012, and a PhD from UQAM in Montreal, Quebec in 2022.

== Work ==
Smith's initial artistic medium was photography; later installations include a variety of media. His work, both plastic and theoretical, is now described as "indisciplinary". Smith has engaged in collaborations with scientific and philosophical research teams and labs - such as the French National Centre for Scientific Research in 2012, and the IRAP (Institut de recherche en astrophysique et planétologie) in 2018.

In the interactive installation "Cellulairement" (2012), a thermal capture device in the installation space was connected to an electronic chip implanted in Smith's body, allowing Smith to feel the presence of viewers.

Many of Smith's early works explore questions of gender and personal identity. The idea of transition is a central element of his artistic practice. French photographer and photography specialist Arnaud Claass wrote about Smith's work, in the preface of Smith's first monographic book: "There is no mystery; Smith's approach to the visible, at once luminarist and dark, is valid as an image of the uncertainty of sexual roles. Questions of gender, a current in philosophy over the last twenty years or more, occupy an important place in the intellectual development of [Smith's] oeuvre.". Along with French curator Nadège Piton, Smith wrote the book "Transgalactic" in 2020 about queer & trans presences in contemporary photography, and curated the eponymous exhibition presented in March 2023 at La Filature, Mulhouse.

His most recent projects are "Spectrographies" (2014), "TRAUM" (2015–18), "Saturnium" (2017) and "Desideration" (2019–2021). They were presented during cinema festivals in Europe, at the Centre Pompidou, and Théâtre de la Cité Internationale (Paris), at the CND (Pantin), at the Dance Museum (Rennes) and at the CCN-ICI (Montpellier).

Smith's visual works were exhibited as solo shows at the Rencontres Internationales de la Photographie (Arles), at the Filles du Calvaire gallery and Palais de Tokyo (Paris), at the Photographic Museum of Helsinki (Finland), as well as several countries in Europe (Sweden, Luxembourg, Germany, Spain, Italy, Austria, Switzerland), Asia (China, Cambodia, South Korea) and Latin America (Mexico, Chile, Uruguay).

Smith is represented by Christophe Gaillard gallery in Paris. He is currently an associate artist at La Filature - Scène Nationale in Mulhouse, and laureate of the 2023 Villa Albertine in partnership with the French writer Marie NDiaye.

== Publications ==
His first book, "Löyly" (Filigranes) was published in 2013, followed by "Saturnium" (Actes Sud) in 2017, a long-length interview by art historian Christine Ollier in 2017, "Juste entre nous" (André Frère), the opera booklet "Astroblème" (Filigranes), and the traval-photobook "Valparaiso" (André Frère).

- Dorothée Smith (préf. Arnaud Claass), Löyly & Sub Limis, Le Château d’Eau, 2011 (ISBN 978-29-19398-03-4)
- Dorothée Smith et Dominique Baqué, Löyly, Filigranes, 2013 (ISBN 978-23-50462-96-7)
- Smith, Antonin Tri Hoang, Jean-Philippe Uzan, Claire Moulène et Alain Fleischer, Saturnium - Conte musical et photographique, Musicales Actes Sud, 6 September 2017 (ISBN 3149028113723)
- Smith, Valparaiso (Si tu pleux), André Frère Editions, 2018
- Smith & Christine Ollier, André Frère Éditions, 2017 (ISBN 979-10-92265-64-4)
- Smith, Astroblème, Coffret "1+2 L'origine manquante", Filigranes, 2018 (ISBN 978-2-35046-457-2)
- Smith, Désidération (prologue), Textuel, 2021 (ISBN 2845978642)
- Smith, Desiderea Nuncia, Palais Books, 2021 (ISBN 9782493123008)
- Smith, Paris (Contralto), Palais Books, 2021 (ISBN 9782493123008)
- Smith, Dami, Filigraines, 2025 (ISBN 978-2-35046-655-2)

== Solo exhibitions ==
- 2008–2009: galerie AnnexOne, galerie Dask, Copenhague
- 2009: Nuit Blanche, Chapelle de la maternité Sainte Croix, Metz, avec une performance de Sir Alice
- 2011–2015: Löyly, 4th festival Photo Phnom Penh, Institut Français du Cambodge (commissariat de Christian Caujolle); Encontros da Imagem, Brago, Portugal; Festival Photofolies, Rodez; The Finnish Museum of Photography, Helsinki, Finlande
- 2011: Sub Limis, galerie du Château d'eau de Toulouse, Toulouse
- 2012–2013: "Hear us marching up slowly", Rencontres d'Arles; Photospring Festival of Caochangdi, Chine (commissaire : Didier de Faÿs)
- 2015: Entre deux fantômes, Pavillon Vendôme, Clichy
- 2016: Давайте Мечтать, galerie les Filles du Calvaire, Paris
- 2017: TRAUM, Patricia Conde Galeria, Mexico, Mexique; Institut Chorégraphique International, Montpellier (commissaire : Christian Rizzo)
- 2018: Spectrographies, San José foto Festival, Uruguay
- 2021, "Désidération (Anamanda Sîn)", Rencontres d'Arles

== Selected works ==
- 2009 Löyly, series of photographs
- 2010 Sub Limis, series of photographs
- 2011 C19H28O2 (Agnès), video installation
- 2012 Spectrographies, interactive installation
- 2015 TRAUM, transdisciplinary project (danse, cinema, sculpture, photography, performance)
- 2017 Saturnium, series of photographs & sound installation
- 2017-2021 Désidération, indisciplinary
- 2022-2025 Dami, indisciplinary
