= Georges Berger (engineer) =

French politician (1834–1910)

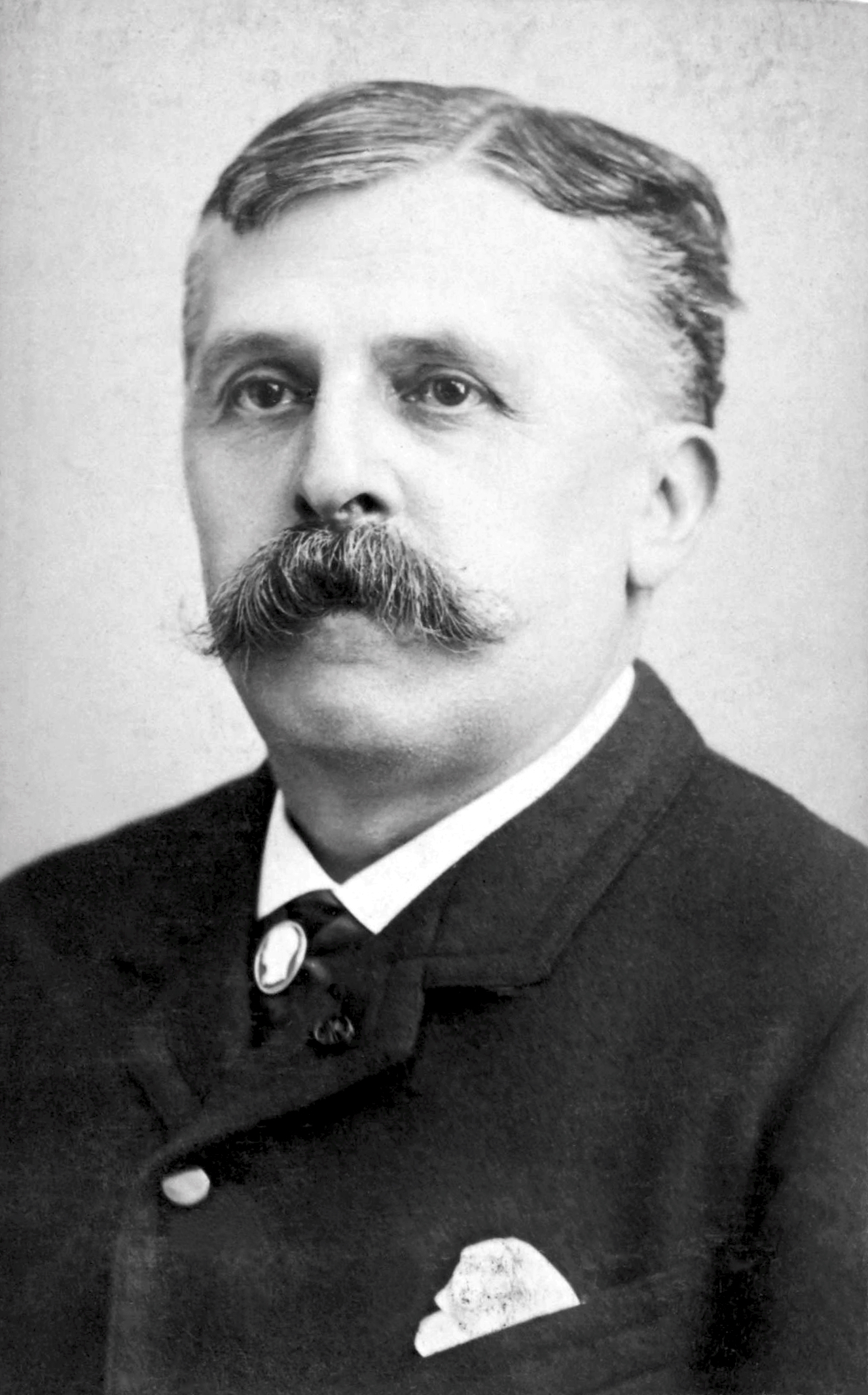
- Georges Berger, by Alphonse Liébert

Deputy for the Department of the Seine
- In office 1889–1910

Personal details
- Born: Paul Georges Louis Berger; October 5, 1834 Paris, France
- Died: July 8, 1910 (aged 75) Versailles, France
- Party: Progressive Republican
- Occupation: Engineer, Politician, Art Enthusiast
- Awards: Order of the Legion of Honour

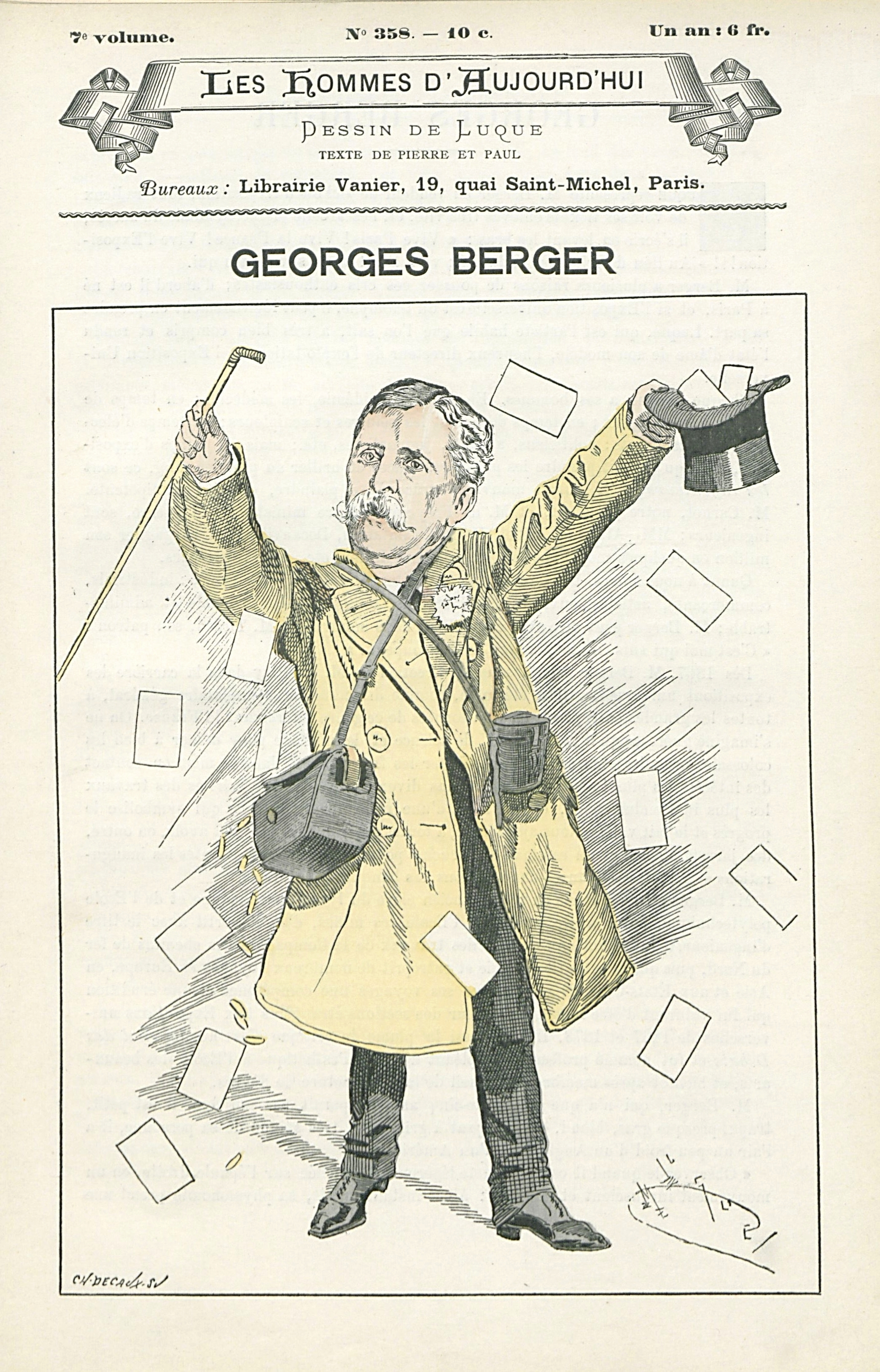
Caricature by Manuel Luque (1889)

Paul Georges Louis Berger (5 October 1834, Paris – 8 July 1910, Versailles) was a French engineer, politician, and art enthusiast.

== Biography ==
He studied at the École des Mines, and worked as an engineer for the Compagnie des chemins de fer du Nord. In 1867, he helped organize the Exposition Universelle. Nine years later, in 1876, he helped to create the French pavilion for the Centennial Exposition in Philadelphia. This led to his becoming a teacher at the École des beaux-arts de Paris. While there, he wrote a book based on his lessons: L'École française de peinture, depuis ses origines jusqu'à la fin du règne de Louis XIV, published by Hachette.

In 1878, he was a member of the jury at the Exposition Universelle He also served on the jury at the Exposition of 1889. During those years, he made contributions to the French pavilions at exhibitions in Amsterdam, Melbourne, and Antwerp. In addition, he was General Commissioner for the Exposition internationale d'Électricité of 1881.

He entered politics in 1889, and was elected a Deputy for the Department of the Seine, on the Progressive Republican ticket. He would hold that office until his death. In 1903, he was elected to the Académie des Beaux-Arts, where he took Seat #5 in the "Unattached" section, succeeding Henry Roujon, who had resigned to become the Académie's Secretary.

Following his work at the Exposition of 1867, he was named a Knight in the Legion of Honor; promoted to Officer in 1878, and Commander in 1889. A section of the Rue Legendre was renamed the Rue Georges-Berger in 1912.
