= Arsac =

- Commune
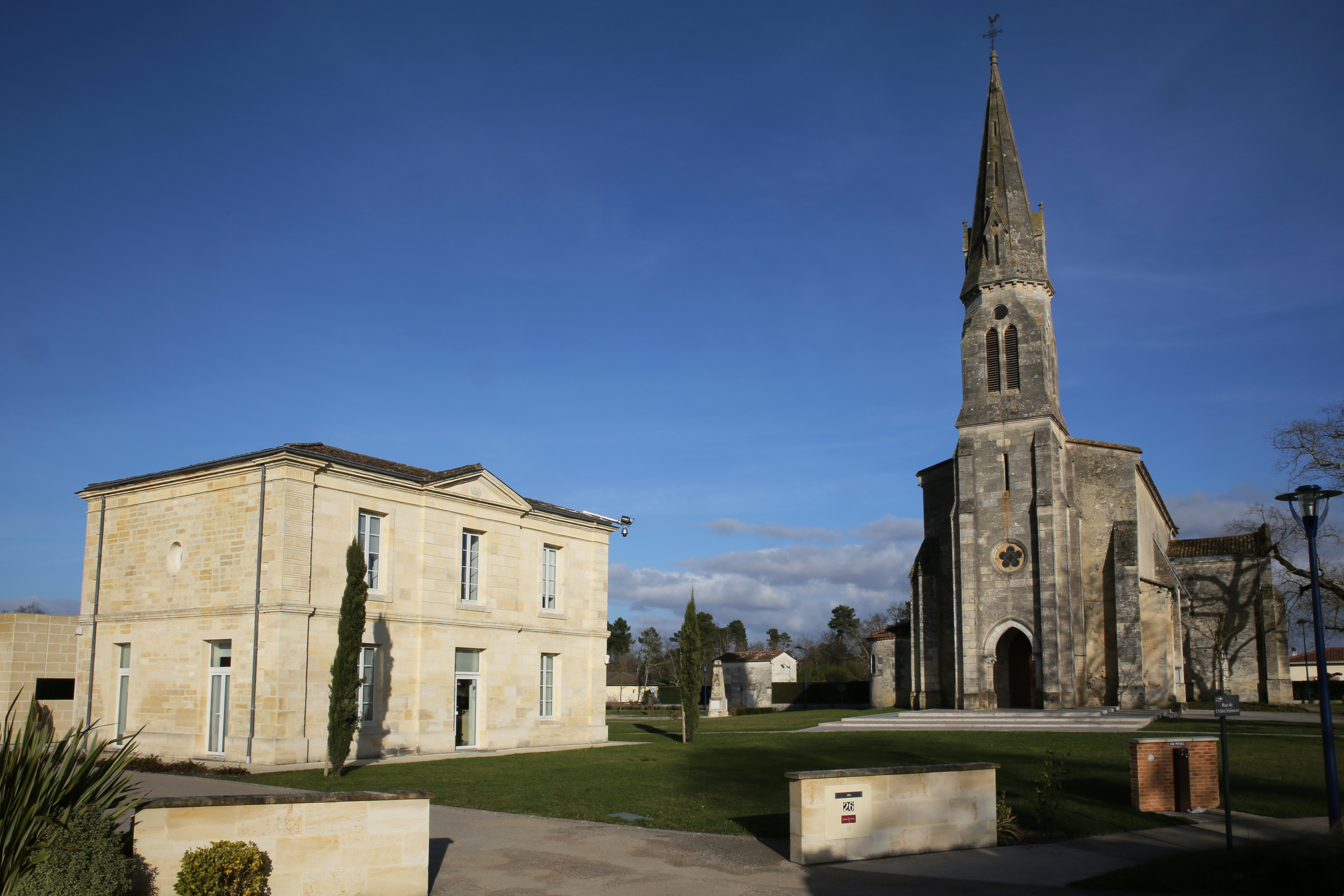
- The town hall and church in Arsac
- Location of Arsac
- Location within France Location within Nouvelle-Aquitaine
- Coordinates: 44°59′52″N 0°41′15″W
- Country: France
- Region: Nouvelle-Aquitaine
- Department: Gironde
- Arrondissement: Lesparre-Médoc
- Canton: Le Sud-Médoc
- Intercommunality: CC Médoc Estuaire

Government
  - Mayor (2022–2026): Frédéric Aurier
- Area^{1}: 32.6 km^{2} (12.6 sq mi)
- Elevation: 15 m (49 ft)
- Highest elevation: 41 m (135 ft)
- Lowest elevation: 5 m (16 ft)
- Population (2023): 4,124
  - Density: 127/km^{2} (328/sq mi)
- Time zone: UTC+01:00 (CET)
  - Summer (DST): UTC+02:00 (CEST)
- INSEE/Postal code: 33012 /33460
- ^{1} French Land Register data, which excludes lakes, ponds, glaciers > 1 km^{2} (0.386 sq mi or 247 acres) and river estuaries.

Arsac (French pronunciation: [aʁsak]) is a commune in the Gironde department in south-western France.

== Population ==
Historical population
Year	Pop.	±% p.a.
1968	685	—
1975	932	+4.50%
1982	1,902	+10.73%
1990	2,729	+4.62%
1999	2,818	+0.36%
2007	2,972	+0.67%
2012	3,285	+2.02%
2017	3,592	+1.80%
2023	4,124	+2.33%
Source: INSEE

== See also ==
- Communes of the Gironde department
