= Canton of Le Sud-Médoc =

Coordinates: 44.98°N 1.08°W

The canton of Le Sud-Médoc is an administrative division of the Gironde department, southwestern France. It was created at the French canton reorganisation which came into effect in March 2015. Its seat is in Lacanau.

It consists of the following communes:

1. Arcins
2. Arsac
3. Avensan
4. Brach
5. Carcans
6. Castelnau-de-Médoc
7. Cussac-Fort-Médoc
8. Hourtin
9. Labarde
10. Lacanau
11. Lamarque
12. Listrac-Médoc
13. Macau
14. Margaux-Cantenac
15. Moulis-en-Médoc
16. Le Porge
17. Sainte-Hélène
18. Saint-Laurent-Médoc
19. Salaunes
20. Saumos
21. Soussans
22. Le Temple
