= Margaux =

Commune in Gironde, France

- Part of Margaux-Cantenac
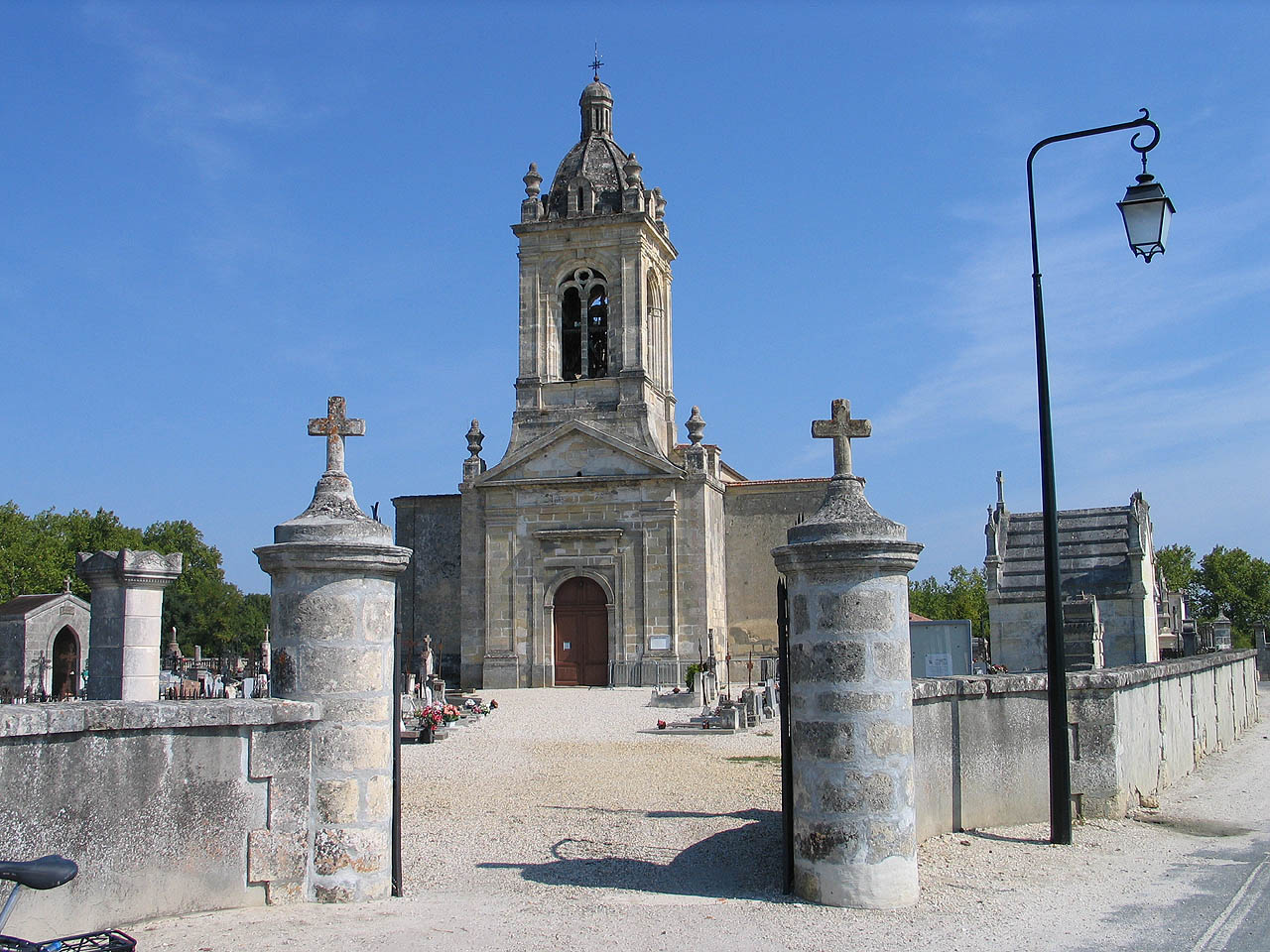

- Coat of arms
- Location of Margaux
- Location within France Location within Nouvelle-Aquitaine
- Coordinates: 45°02′31″N 0°40′32″W
- Country: France
- Region: Nouvelle-Aquitaine
- Department: Gironde
- Arrondissement: Lesparre-Médoc
- Canton: Le Sud-Médoc
- Commune: Margaux-Cantenac
- Area^{1}: 7.36 km^{2} (2.84 sq mi)
- Elevation: 16 m (52 ft)
- Highest elevation: 23 m (75 ft)
- Lowest elevation: 1 m (3.3 ft)
- Population (2014): 1,554
  - Density: 211/km^{2} (547/sq mi)
- Time zone: UTC+01:00 (CET)
  - Summer (DST): UTC+02:00 (CEST)
- Postal code: 33460
- ^{1} French Land Register data, which excludes lakes, ponds, glaciers > 1 km^{2} (0.386 sq mi or 247 acres) and river estuaries.

Margaux (French pronunciation: [maʁɡo]; Gascon: Margaus) is a former commune in the Gironde department in Nouvelle-Aquitaine in southwestern France. On 1 January 2017, it was merged into the new commune Margaux-Cantenac.

== Geography ==
The village lies in the Haut Médoc wine making region on the left bank of the Garonne estuary, northwest of the city of Bordeaux.

== Population ==
Historical population
Year	Pop.	±% p.a.
1962	1,411	—
1968	1,466	+0.64%
1975	1,420	−0.45%
1982	1,360	−0.61%
1990	1,387	+0.25%
1999	1,338	−0.40%
2006	1,391	+0.56%
2014	1,554	+1.39%
Source: EHESS and INSEE

== Wines ==
Margaux is the name of the wine appellation d'origine, Margaux AOC, that encompasses the village and the neighbouring villages of Arsac, Labarde, Soussans and Cantenac, and is the most southerly of Médoc's appellations. The commune makes almost entirely red wine.

The 1855 classification contained more wines from Margaux than from any other appellation, and its best-known vineyard, Château Margaux, was one of only four wines to be awarded the Premier Cru status.

== Cultural references ==
The singer-songwriter and oenologist Al Stewart released an album of songs involving wine in 2000 called Down in the Cellar, of which one track is entitled "Waiting for Margaux."

In the movie Withnail & I, the character Uncle Monty brings a bottle of '53 Margaux ("best of the century") to the cottage in the country.

In the 2009 movie Sherlock Holmes, Holmes (Robert Downey Jr.) refers to a Margaux 1858 and expresses fascination that an astronomical event can affect the quality of the harvest, referring to the 1858 Margaux being a comet vintage.

In the Masterpiece Series TV show Downton Abbey Season 5 Episode 9, A conversation between Carson and Mrs. Hughes... Carson states "They didn't finish this and they are away tomorrow, so I thought we might. It's favorite of mine." "You won't go far wrong with a Margaux" as he pours from a decanter left over from upstairs.

In 'The Final Gambit' by Jennifer Lynn Barnes, Marguax is mentioned when Avery finds a photograph of three women in the pool as a clue left by Tobias Hawthorne.

== See also ==
- French wine
- Bordeaux wine
- Plan Bordeaux
- Bordeaux wine regions
- Communes of the Gironde department
