= Soussans =

- Commune
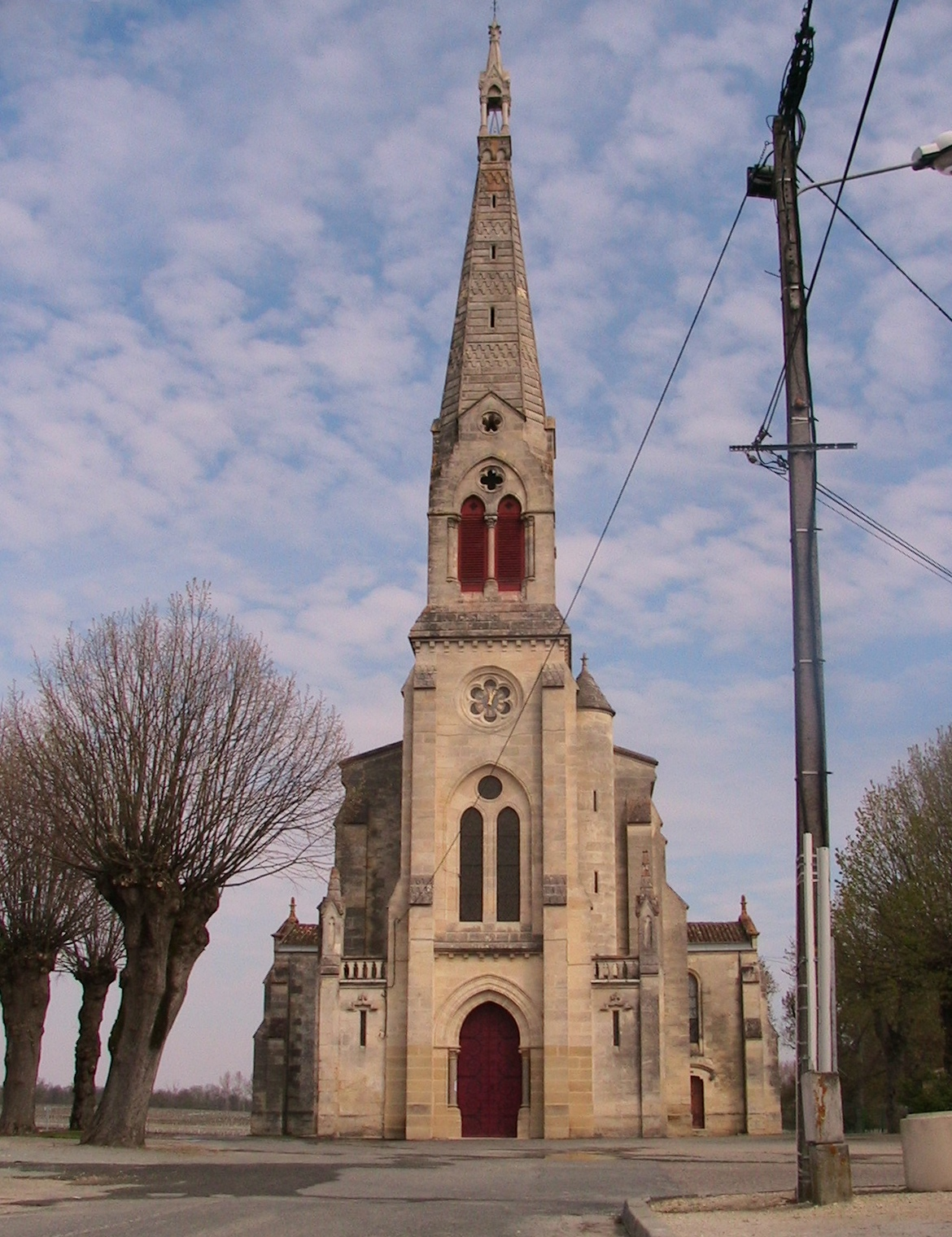
- The church in Soussans
- Location of Soussans
- Location within France Location within Nouvelle-Aquitaine
- Coordinates: 45°03′24″N 0°41′53″W
- Country: France
- Region: Nouvelle-Aquitaine
- Department: Gironde
- Arrondissement: Lesparre-Médoc
- Canton: Le Sud-Médoc
- Intercommunality: Médoc Estuaire

Government
  - Mayor (2020–2026): Karine Palin
- Area^{1}: 13.55 km^{2} (5.23 sq mi)
- Elevation: 15 m (49 ft)
- Highest elevation: 21 m (69 ft)
- Lowest elevation: 1 m (3.3 ft)
- Population (2023): 1,719
  - Density: 126.9/km^{2} (328.6/sq mi)
- Time zone: UTC+01:00 (CET)
  - Summer (DST): UTC+02:00 (CEST)
- INSEE/Postal code: 33517 /33460
- ^{1} French Land Register data, which excludes lakes, ponds, glaciers > 1 km^{2} (0.386 sq mi or 247 acres) and river estuaries.

Soussans (French pronunciation: [susɑ̃]; Occitan: Sauçan) is a commune in the Gironde department in Nouvelle-Aquitaine in southwestern France.

== Population ==
Historical population
Year	Pop.	±% p.a.
1968	918	—
1975	967	+0.75%
1982	1,204	+3.18%
1990	1,352	+1.46%
1999	1,342	−0.08%
2007	1,524	+1.60%
2012	1,555	+0.40%
2017	1,629	+0.93%
2023	1,719	+0.90%
Source: INSEE

== See also ==
- Communes of the Gironde department
