= Château de la Roque =

Castle in France

Coordinates: 44°52′58″N 1°03′50″E

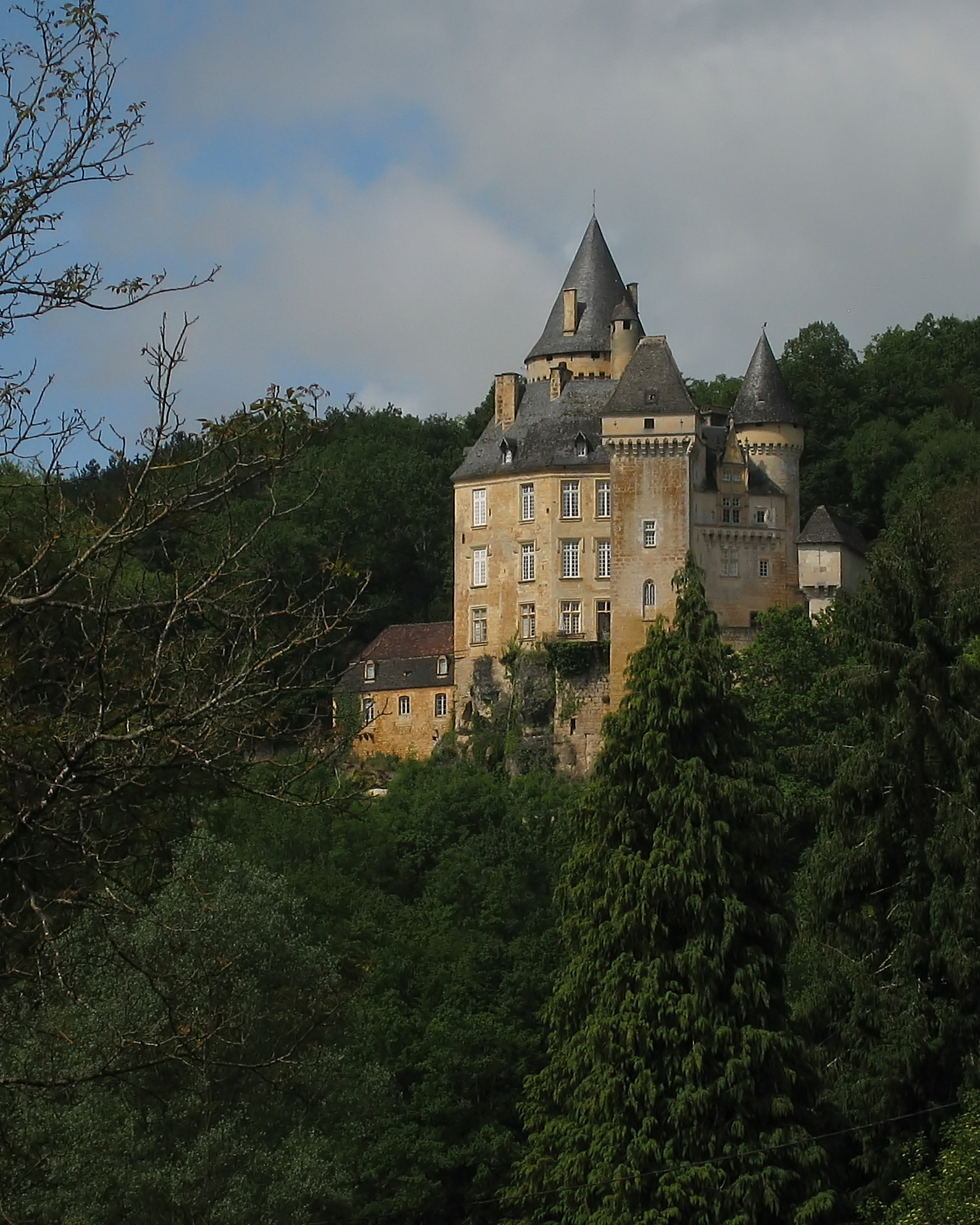

The Château de la Roque, or the Château de la Roque des Péagers, is a château located in Meyrals in the Périgord in the Dordogne, Nouvelle-Aquitaine, France. It was constructed in the 12th century, and modified in the 13th and 16th centuries.

== History ==
The archbishop of Paris, Christophe de Beaumont du Repaire (1703-1781), was born in this château and was later sent in exile to it by Louis XV for having tried to convince him to give up his mistress Madame de Pompadour. The château was enrolled as an historic monument on 5 November 1927, and the frescoes from the 16th century decorating the oratory were classified on 1 October 1963.

== Architecture ==
The Château de la Roque was built on a defensive site over ancient caves on the flank of a steep hill which dominates the valley of the Moulan River, today an inconspicuous stream. Access to the interior courtyard is through an entrance châtelet. The different parts of the château are topped by a slate roof and enclose a courtyard with round towers.

== See also ==
- Meyrals

== Bibliography ==
- Gaborit, Michelle: Aspects de la peinture murale médiévale en Périgord, présenté au Congrès archéologique de France - Monuments en Périgord, 156e session.
