= Nouvelle-Aquitaine =

Administrative region of France

Nouvelle-Aquitaine Nòva Aquitània (Occitan) Akitania Berria (Basque) Novéle-Aguiéne (Poitevin-Saintongeais)
- Region
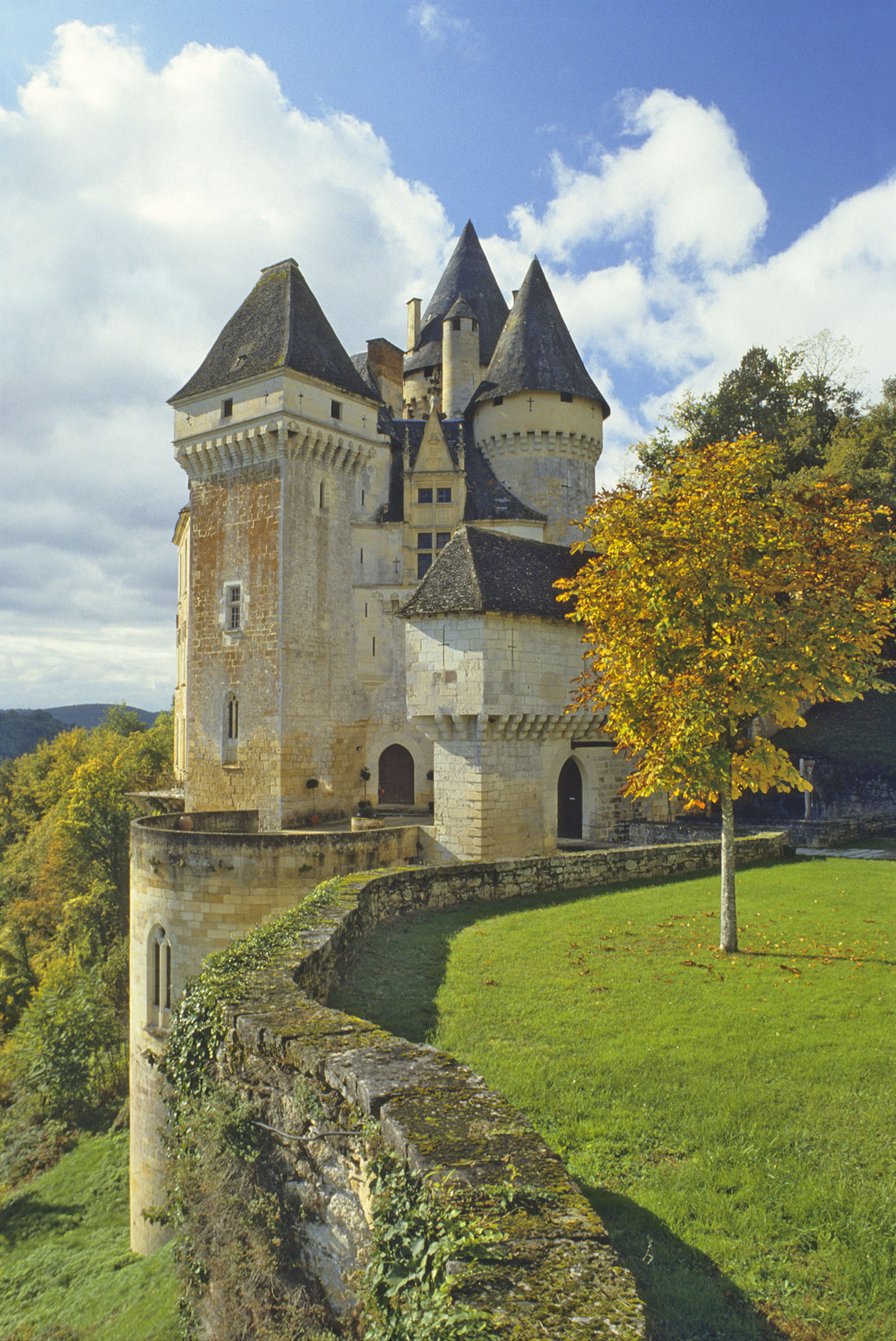
- The Château de la Roque in Meyrals

- Flag Coat of arms

- Country: France
- Prefecture: Bordeaux
- Departments: 12: Charente (16); Charente-Maritime (17); Corrèze (19); Creuse (23); Dordogne (24); Gironde (33); Landes (40); Lot-et-Garonne (47); Pyrénées-Atlantiques (64); Deux-Sèvres (79); Vienne (86); Haute-Vienne (87)

Government
  - President of the Regional Council: Alain Rousset (PS)

Area
  - Total: 84,036 km^{2} (32,446 sq mi)
  - Rank: 1st

Population (2023)
  - Total: 6,150,451
  - Density: 73.188/km^{2} (189.56/sq mi)
- Demonym: New-aquitanians

GDP
  - Total: €189.278 billion
  - Per capita: €31,700
- Time zone: UTC+01:00 (CET)
  - Summer (DST): UTC+02:00 (CEST)
- ISO 3166 code: FR-NAQ
- Official languages: French
- Website: nouvelle-aquitaine.fr

Nouvelle-Aquitaine (French pronunciation: [nuvɛl akitɛn]) is the largest administrative region in France by area, located in the west and southwest of Metropolitan France. It was created in 2014 from the merger of Aquitaine, Limousin, and Poitou-Charentes in a territorial reform. The region covers 84,035.7 km^{2} (32,446.4 sq mi), representing more than 1/7 of Metropolitan France, and had a population of 6,033,952 in 2020. The new region was formally established on 1 January 2016, following the regional elections in December 2015.

The region is larger in area than any other French region, including overseas regions such as French Guiana, and has a landmass that is slightly greater than Austria. Bordeaux is the prefecture and largest city; its metropolitan area has about 850,000 inhabitants. The region has 25 major urban areas, among which the most important after Bordeaux are Bayonne (288,000 inhabitants), Limoges (283,000), Poitiers (255,000), Pau (241,000) and La Rochelle (206,000), as well as eleven major clusters.

Nouvelle-Aquitaine has five universities (Bordeaux, La Rochelle, Limoges, Poitiers and Pau) and several Grandes Écoles. It has three of the four historic resorts on the French Atlantic coast: Arcachon, Biarritz and Royan, as well as ski resorts in the Pyrenees, including Gourette.

Its economy includes agriculture, viticulture (notably the vineyards of Bordeaux and Cognac), tourism, aerospace manufacturing, the digital sector, design, chemical and pharmaceutical production, financial service in Niort, and industrial ceramics in Limoges. The new region includes major parts of Southern France ("Midi de la France"), influenced by Basque, Occitan, Poitevin and Saintongeais cultures. Historically, it is the "indirect successor" to medieval Aquitaine; much of the region was part of the former Duchy of Aquitaine.

== Toponymy ==
Map of the new region with its twelve départements, colored according to the historical provinces as they existed until 1790. Guyenne and Gascony Poitou Limousin Marche Saintonge Angoumois Aunis Lower Navarre and Béarn Saumurois Others

The region's interim name Aquitaine-Limousin-Poitou-Charentes was a hyphenated placename, known as ALPC, created by hyphenating the merged regions' names – Aquitaine, Limousin and Poitou-Charentes – in alphabetical order.

In June 2016, a working group headed by historian Anne-Marie Cocula, a former vice-president of Aquitaine, proposed the name "Nouvelle Aquitaine", meaning "New Aquitaine". The decision came after the popular favourite, "Aquitaine", faced resistance by regional politicians from Limousin and Poitou-Charentes. The other popular favourite, "Grande Aquitaine", was rejected for its connotation with a feeling of superiority. Alain Rousset, president of the region, concurred with the working group's conclusion, reaffirming that he considered the acronym "ALPC" no choice at all. For those deploring the loss of "Limousin" and "Poitou-Charentes", he noted that the predecessor region of Aquitaine subsumed the identities of the Périgord or the Pays Basque, which did not disappear during its 40 years of operation.

On 27 June 2016, just a few days ahead of 1 July deadline, the Regional Council almost unanimously adopted Nouvelle-Aquitaine as the region's permanent name. France's Conseil d'État approved Nouvelle-Aquitaine as the new name of the region on 28 September 2016, effective two days later.

== History ==
- For the recent history of each former administrative regions and departments before 2016,
- For the history of past entities covering much of the area of the region before the French revolution,

== Geography ==
At 84,061 square kilometres, Nouvelle-Aquitaine is larger than French Guiana, which makes it the largest region of metropolitan and overseas France.

Nouvelle-Aquitaine is delimited by four other French regions (Pays de la Loire to the north-west, Centre-Val de Loire to the northeast, Auvergne-Rhône-Alpes to the east, and Occitania to the south-east), three autonomous communities in Spain to the south (from east to west, Aragon, Navarre, and Basque Country), and the North Atlantic Ocean (the eastern part of Bay of Biscay, Golfe de Gascogne in French) to the west.

=== Departments ===
Nouvelle-Aquitaine comprises twelve departments: Charente, Charente-Maritime, Corrèze, Creuse, Dordogne, Gironde, Landes, Lot-et-Garonne, Pyrénées-Atlantiques, Deux-Sèvres, Vienne and Haute-Vienne.

=== Urban centers ===
Its largest city and only metropolis is Bordeaux, in the heart of an urban agglomeration of over one million inhabitants. Taking into consideration the urban area, the new region is home to six of the fifty largest metropolitan areas of French territory (population 2011):

- Bordeaux (1,140,668 inhabitants)
- Bayonne (283,571)
- Limoges (282,876)
- Poitiers (254 051)
- Pau (240,898)
- La Rochelle (205,822).

In addition, the region has a network of medium-sized towns scattered throughout its territory, including:

- Angoulême (108,304)
- Agen (79,764)
- Brive-la-Gaillarde (75,925)
- Niort (71,046)
- Périgueux (66,423)
- Bergerac (64,427)
- Villeneuve-sur-Lot (49,354)
- Dax (48,820)
- Mont-de-Marsan (40,269)

=== Geographical features ===
The region covers a large part of the Aquitaine Basin and a small portion of the Paris Basin (the border between the two being located at the "Seuil du Poitou") and the Limousin plate (part of the Massif Central) and the western part of the Pyrenees. It is part of five watersheds facing the Atlantic Ocean: Loire, Charente, Garonne and Dordogne (and their extension, the Gironde estuary) and Adour, giving rivers bordering land dedicated mostly to viticulture and to agriculture.

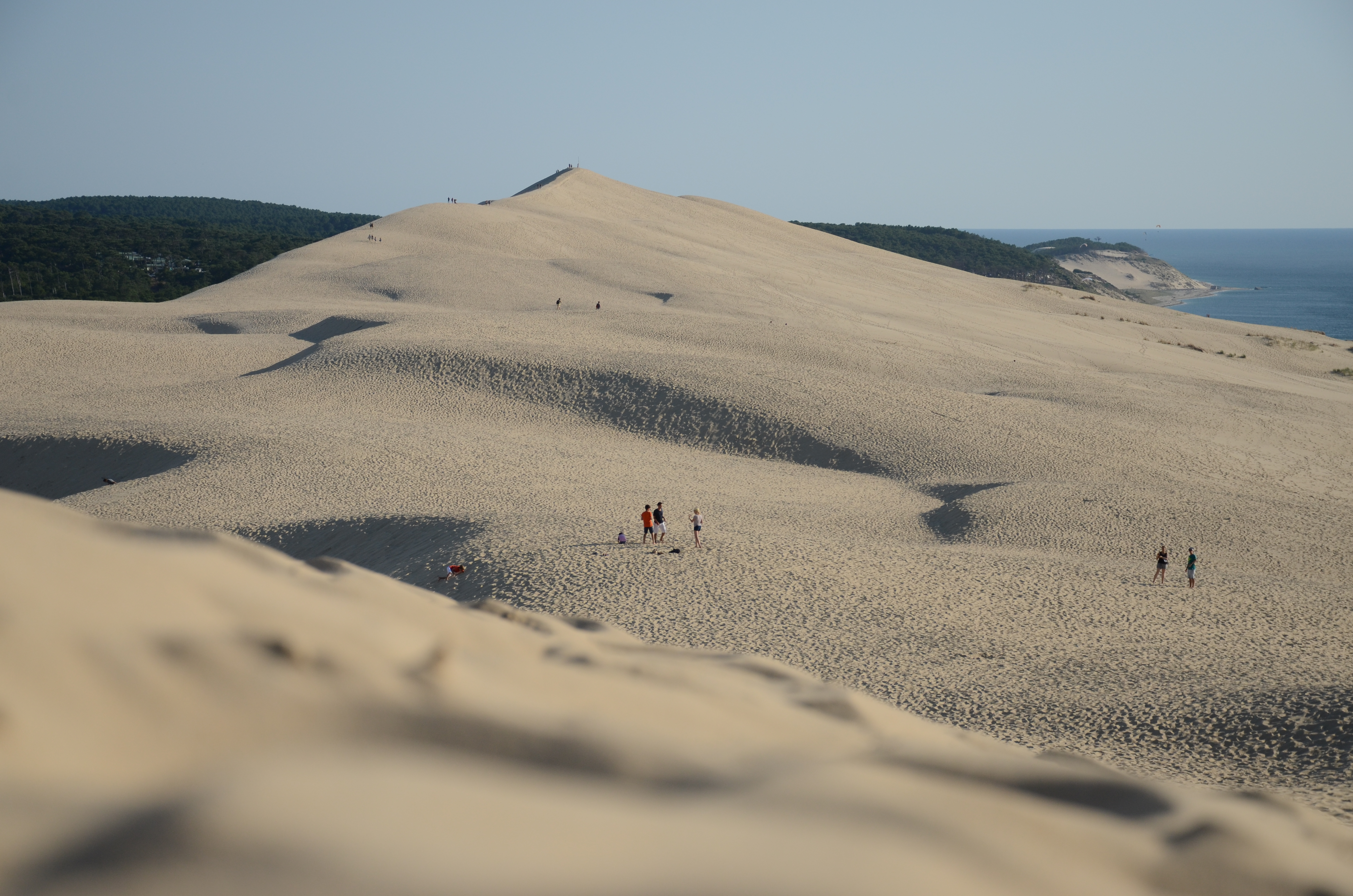
The Dune of Pilat is the tallest dune in Europe.

Nouvelle-Aquitaine features a large open coastline along the Atlantic Ocean, extending from the National Nature Reserve of Aiguillon Bay and the estuary of the Sèvre (near Charron) to Bidasoa (south of Hendaye). This coastline includes the islands of the Charentais Archipelago (Ré, Oléron, Aix, and Madame) and the inlet of Arcachon. The region is notable for its oyster farming (Marennes-Oléron and the Bassin d’Arcachon), mussel farming (Baie de l’Aiguillon), and tourism. Prominent resorts in the area include Arcachon (Côte d’Argent), Biarritz (Côte Basque), and Royan (Côte de Beauté).

From the Arvert Peninsula to the coast of Labourd, the coastline is predominantly straight and characterized by high dunes, including Dune du Pilat, large lakes (such as Lac d'Hourtin-Carcans, Étang de Lacanau, Étang de Cazaux et de Sanguinet, and Lac de Biscarrosse et de Parentis), and wetlands (including the Réserve Naturelle Nationale des Dunes et Marais d'Hourtin), all situated above vast pine forests planted in the 19th century. The Landes forest, the most extensive in the region, covers nearly one million hectares (approximately 950,000 hectares of maritime pines), making it the largest artificial forest in Western Europe. This forest forms a vast triangle extending from the Pointe de Grave, north of Soulac-sur-Mer, to Hossegor in the south and Nérac in the east, replacing the sandy and marshy moorland that characterized the region for centuries. The Landes forest is partially included in the Landes de Gascogne Regional Natural Park, which begins south of Bordeaux.

Further north, adjacent to the Landes forest, the forest of la Coubre on the right bank of the Gironde estuary shares similar characteristics, covering nearly 8,000 hectares. Other significant forests in the region include the Irati Forest in the Basque Country, which spans over 17,000 hectares, and the Forest of the Double, located at the borders of Charente, Charente-Maritime, and Dordogne, which covers about 50,000 hectares and is dotted with nearly 500 lakes. Additionally, near Poitiers, the Moulière forest extends over nearly 6,800 hectares, and to the east, near Guéret, the Chabrières forest encompasses 2,000 hectares.

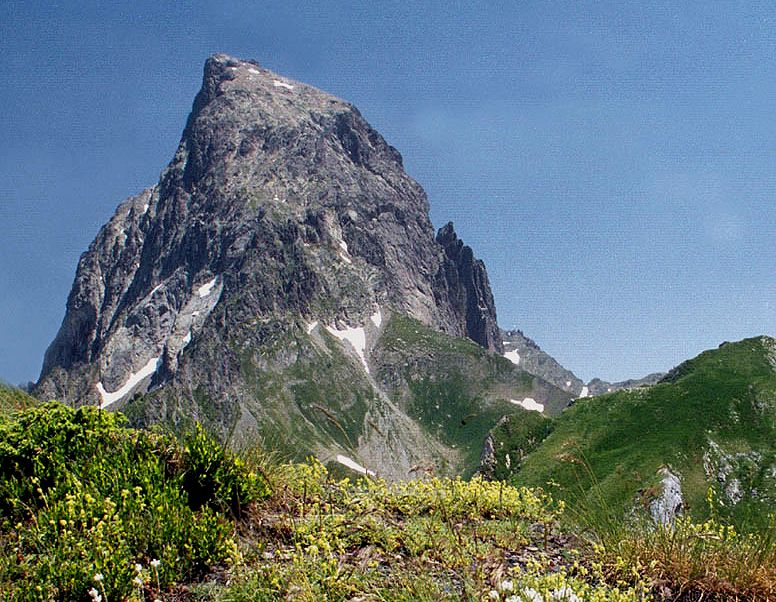
Pic du Midi d'Ossau

The extreme southern region of Nouvelle-Aquitaine is characterized by the presence of the Pyrenees. The western part, known as the mountains of Labourd, consists mostly of high green hills. Further east, the highest point in the French Basque Country is Pic d'Orhy, which reaches 2,017 meters. The Pau region is notable for its more rugged, mineral landscapes, featuring high peaks often exceeding 2,000 meters. The highest point in the region, Pic Palas, stands at 2,974 meters. Other significant Pyrenean peaks in the region include Pic du Midi d'Ossau (2,884 m), Pic d'Arriel (2,824 m), Pic de Ger (2,613 m) near the winter resort Gourette, Pic d'Anie (2,504 m), Latte de Bazen (2,472 m), Pic d'Ansabère (2,377 m), Pic de l'Arraille (2,147 m), and Pic d'Arlas (2,044 m).

This hilly region is traversed by numerous mountain streams, known as gaves. Notable gaves in the area include the Gave de Pau, the Gave de Bious, the Gave d'Ossau, and the Gaves réunis on the border of Landes and Pyrénées-Atlantiques. The Ossau Valley, one of the three valleys of Béarn, extends from the suburbs of Pau to Col du Pourtalet at the Spanish border. The region's glacial lakes, along with their diverse fauna and flora, contribute to its inclusion in the Pyrénées National Park.

Belonging to the Massif Central, Limousin features a varied landscape with high plateaus and some eroded peaks that dominate green valleys and forests of oak and chestnut trees. The Limousin plateau, intersected by the valleys of the Vienne (which flows through its capital, Limoges), Isle, Vézère, and the picturesque Corrèze with its deep reliefs, seldom exceeds 500 meters in elevation. It forms the watershed between the Loire basin to the north (including the sources of the Briance, Aixette, Grêne, and Gorre), the Dordogne basin to the south (including the sources of the Dronne, Isle, and Auvézère), and the maritime watershed of the Charente to the west.

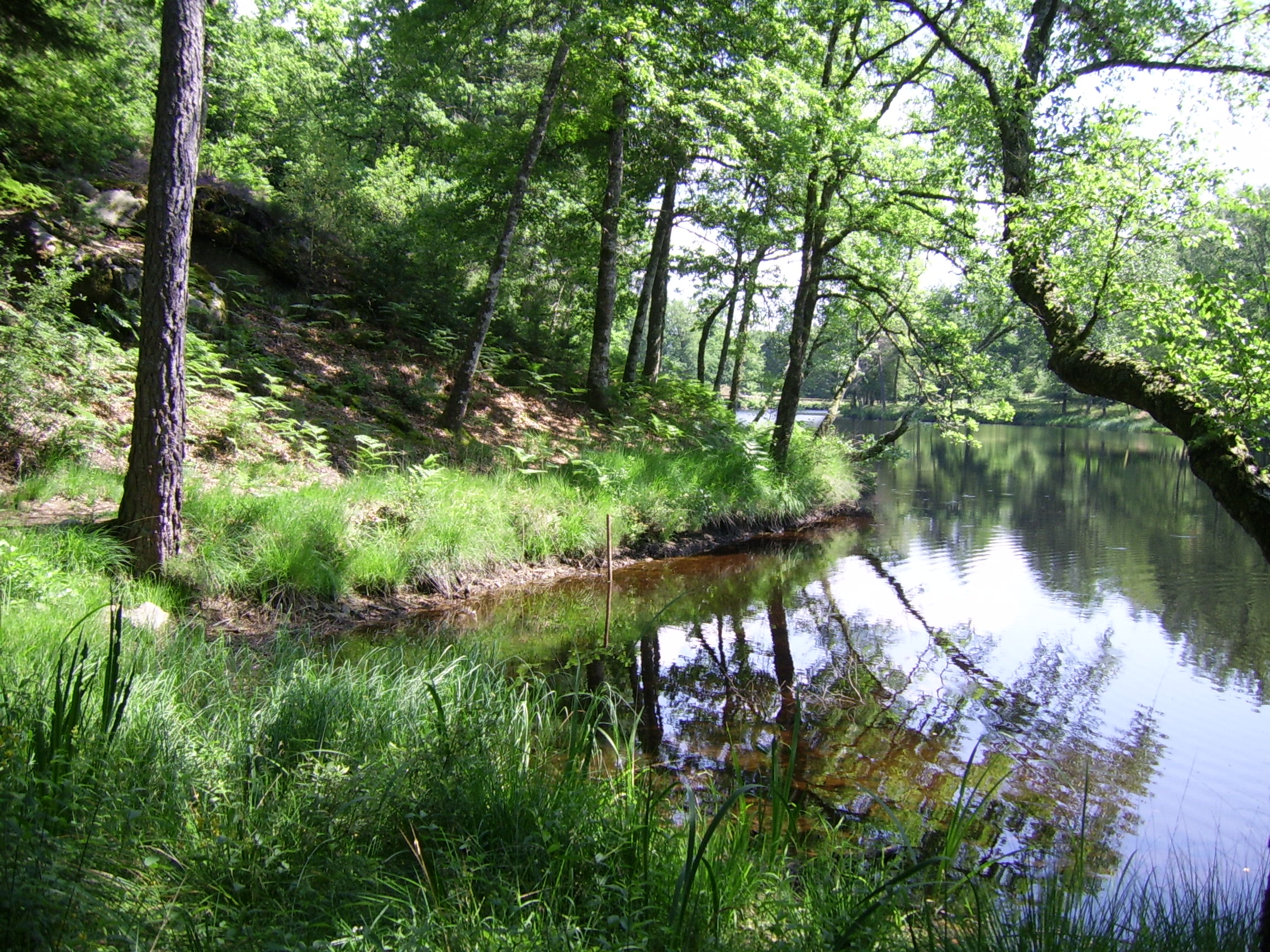
Typical landscape in Corrèze

The mountains of Limousin, which include a series of small mountains (Mont Fayat, Monedières Hills, Mont de Châlus) peak at Mont Bessou (976 m), in Corrèze. Further north, the mountains of Marche, which are divided into mountains of Monts de Guéret, mont d'Ambazac and Monts de Blond, are more like high wooded hills dotted with pastures, as real peaks. They culminate in Signal de Sauvagnac (701 m), in Haute-Vienne. Southwest of Limousin and Périgord northwest since 1998 are integrated into the Parc naturel régional Périgord Limousin.

The northern part of the region, which corresponds to the Haut-Poitou history, is organised around a tray agricultural and viticultural (vineyard of Haut-Poitou) irrigated by the Vienne, Clain or the Gartempe, which form so little valleys, often lined with oak forests. Further south, the Niortais this open landscapes (openfields) in grain-dominant, but also rich wetland areas such as the Marais Poitevin, a legacy of an old marine gulf filled with alluvium, which is divided into wet marshes (we speak more readily of "Green Venice") and marshes dried up, converted into mixed farming. Niort, on the Sèvre Niortaise, the main town of the Haut-Poitou outside Poitiers, is like a door of this "Green Venice" much of which belongs to the parc naturel régional du Marais poitevin, established in 1979, classified "Grand site de France".

Further south lie the Charentes, which correspond to the former provinces of Aunis, Angoumois and Saintonge. Aunis is not unlike the landscape of Niortais, with large marshes that extend from either side of La Rochelle and Rochefort (Baie d'Yves, marais de Rochefort, Broue and Brouage) but also the islands of Ré and Aix, with varied landscapes where pine forests mingle, sandy beaches or the curious lagoon of Fier d'Ars, the sands in constant motion, which houses a bird sanctuary. The interior of the territory is marked by the presence of a rich plain cereal evoking the Beauce by its open relief on the horizon. At the center of this space, the city of Surgères remained a pastureland where dairy farming has retained its importance: the small city is thus a production centers butter, Beurre de Charentes-Poitou.

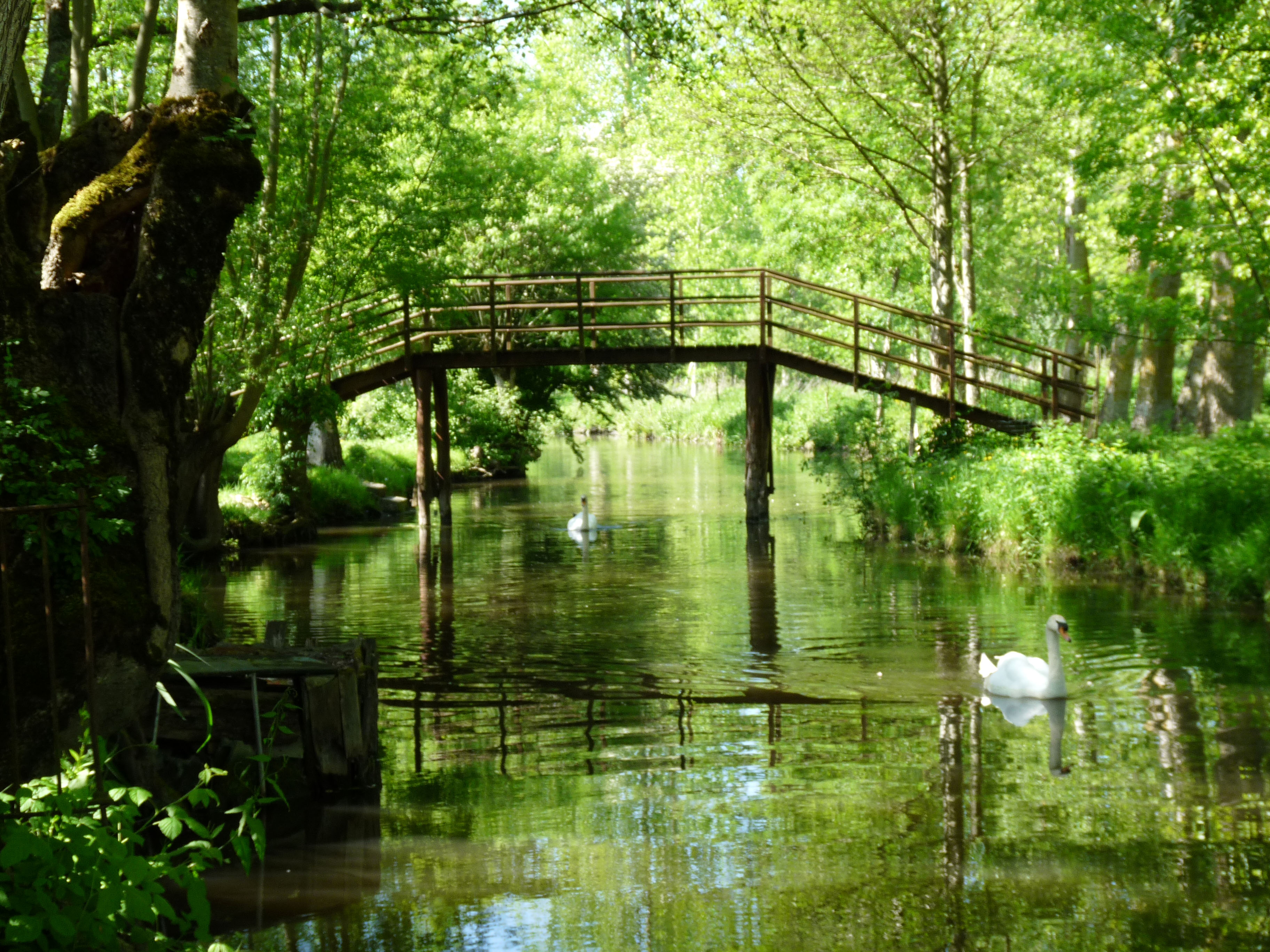
Between Poitou and Charente-Maritime, the Marais Poitevin

The Angoumois forms a transitional space between the coastal plains of Aunis, large "champagne" of Saintonge and Limousin plateau. Dotted with small hills, he seems to live to the rhythm of the Charente, real artery watering its major cities, Angoulême, Cognac and Jarnac. Great wine region, internationally renowned alcohol is produced there, cognac, and a water spirits called Pineau des Charentes. The western quarter of Charentes consists of Saintonge, organised territory around the towns of Saintes, the first capital of Aquitaine in Roman times, and Royan.

In continuation of the Angoumois, the Dordogne approximately corresponds to the former province of Périgord. Taking its name from the river of the same name, which flows Bergerac but not its prefecture, Périgueux (the edge of the Isle), the area with varied landscapes has a large afforestation rate (45%) making it the third most wooded department France. The great forests of oak and chestnut trees of green Périgord, organised around Nontron, meet the great grain fields of the White Périgord, nicknamed "the breadbasket of the Périgord", the oak, walnut and black Périgord truffle, around Sarlat-la-Caneda and vineyards of Bergerac or purple Périgord, which produces Bergerac, monbazillac or pécharmant.

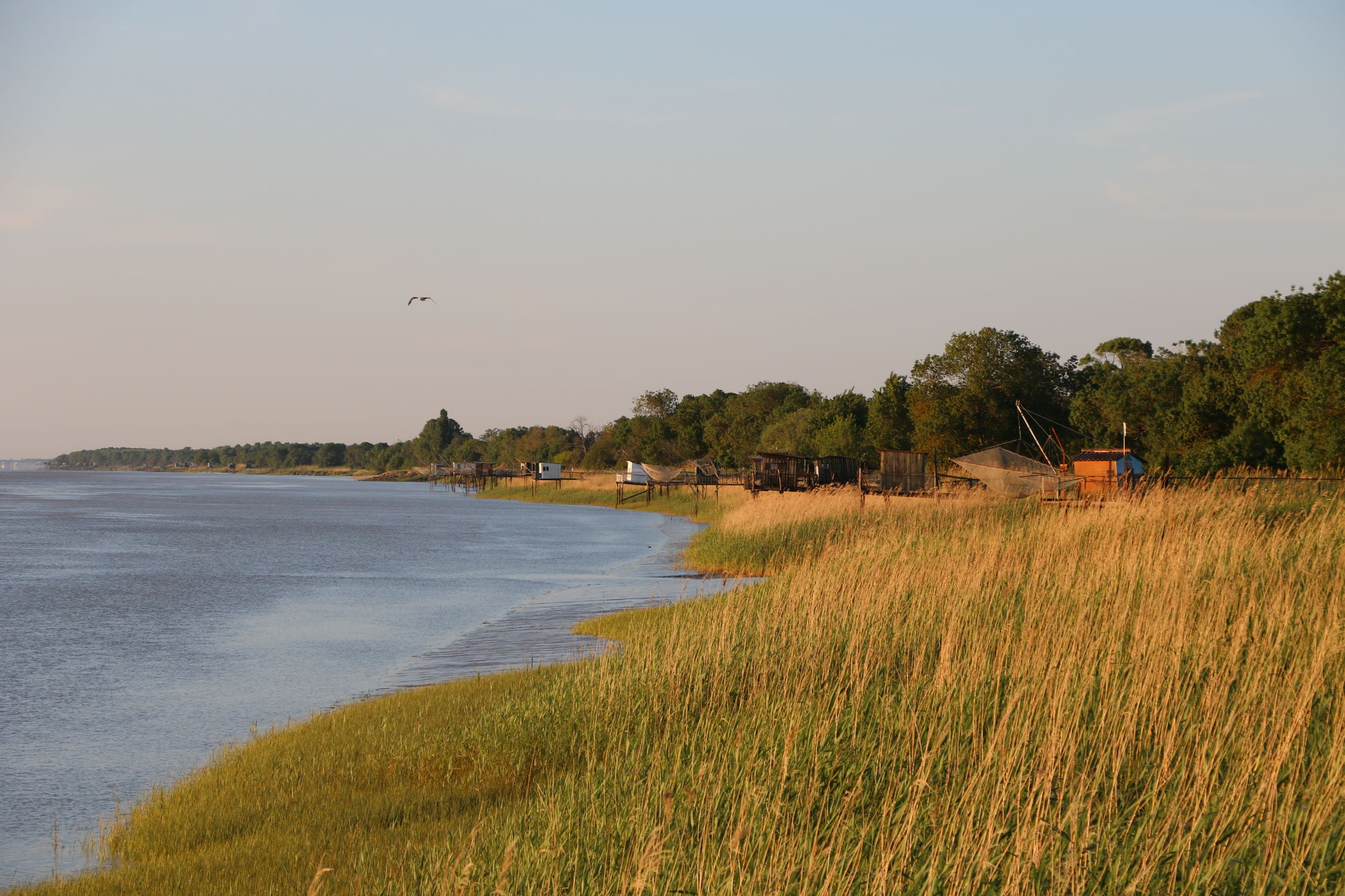
The Gironde estuary is the largest estuary in Western Europe.

The Gironde estuary, which acts as a link between Saintonge, Blayais, Médoc and western Guyenne, is in itself a world apart. Wild largest estuary in Europe, being classified in the marine park with the "Pertuis charentais", it is lined with large marshes ("Petite Camargue" and hillsides which produces most of the great Bordeaux wines from the Côtes-de-Bordeaux and Côtes-de-Bourg on the right bank to the great wines of the left bank Médoc (Pauillac, Margaux, Saint-Estèphe, Saint-Julien. The vineyards of Bordeaux, with international reputation, has done for centuries the reputation of the region. His productions are exported worldwide.

Farther south lies the vast plain Landes (south of Gironde and Landes), which begins near Bordeaux and go to the Pyrénées. Largely occupied by the Landes forest, it is also a major agricultural area (maize farming) and hosts a spa of international reputation, Dax, also the capital of Chalosse, important breeding ground.

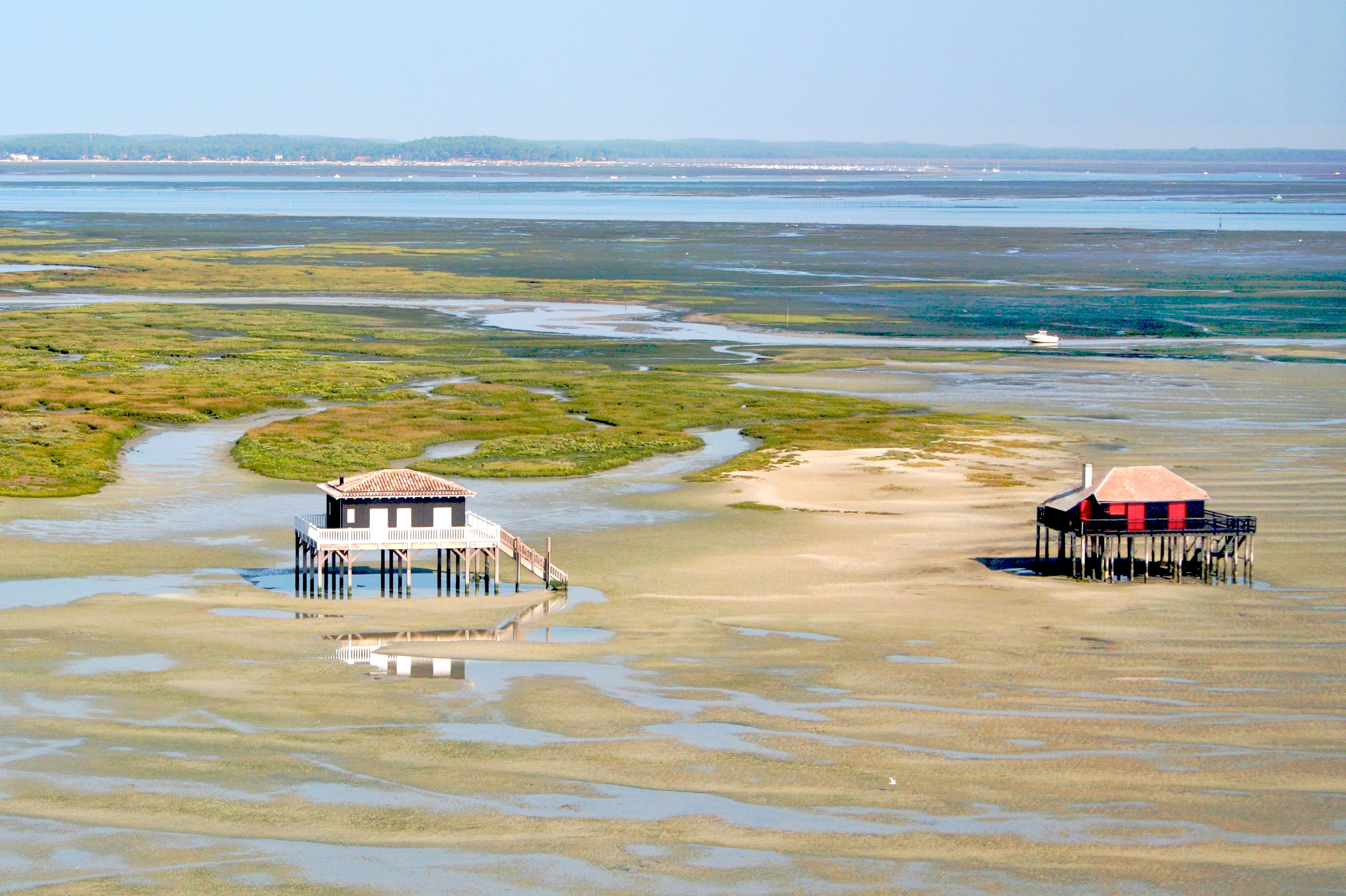
"Cabanes tchanquées" in Arcachon Bay

The coastline subject to severe erosion, remained very wild. Some resorts have been built in the dunes from Soulac-sur-Mer in the north of the Gironde, via Lacanau, Hourtin, Biscarrosse, Mimizan and Capbreton, without forgetting those bordering the Bay of Arcachon: Arcachon, Andernos-les-Bains, Lège-Cap-Ferret, Pyla-sur-Mer. This vast lagoon, wide open ocean, has housed the marine natural park of Arcachon Basin since 2014.

Eastern Guyenne corresponds in part to the department of Lot-et-Garonne. Rich agricultural and farming area watered by both the Lot and the Garonne, it is famous for its "pruneaux", who took the name of its capital, Agen (nearly 8000 hectares of land are dedicated to Ente plum orchards) while Marmande is famous for its tomatoes. The mild climate explains that also cultivated tobacco, as well as strawberries ("gariguettes") and vines, used to produce the Côtes du marmandais the buzet or Côte de Brulhois, that relate to the broad vineyard of the Southwest. But the real glory of this land is Armagnac, a famous brandy, exported around the world. Its vineyards cover some of the departments of Lot-et-Garonne, Landes but also the Gers (in the neighbouring region of Occitania). It also produces the floc de Gascogne, with delicate floral accents.

The extreme south of the region consists of two territories in strong identity, the Basque Country (Northern Basque Country or "Iparralde") and Béarn. The first, which is organised around Bayonne, Biarritz, Saint-Jean-de-Luz (Labourd) Mauléon-Licharre (Soule) and Saint-Jean-Pied-de-Port (Lower Navarre) has its warm and humid climate its green side, the Atlantic rains from butter against the Pyrenean barrier. The coast, with both high-end and family resorts, is a popular holiday resort. The interior is more rural and retains a strong agricultural tradition, and is a solid wine region, symbolised by the vineyard Irouléguy but also by traditional liquors such as izarra and patxaran, eau-de-vie characteristic of Navarre.

Anchored in the heart of the Pyrenees, the Béarn opposes its Gascon traditions. It has a succession of gently accented hills and valleys (that of Pau river, where the capital is located, Pau, and others named Orthez and Navarrenx, being the most populated), it comprises the Aspe, the Barétous and Ossau valleys along with the Col du Soulor. Agriculture will always be prominent, as viticulture (jurançon, Madiran) even if the aeronautical and petrochemical sectors are also represented. The main ski resorts in the area, such as Artouste, Gourette, Issarbe, La Pierre Saint-Martin and Le Somport are concentrated in the Béarn area.

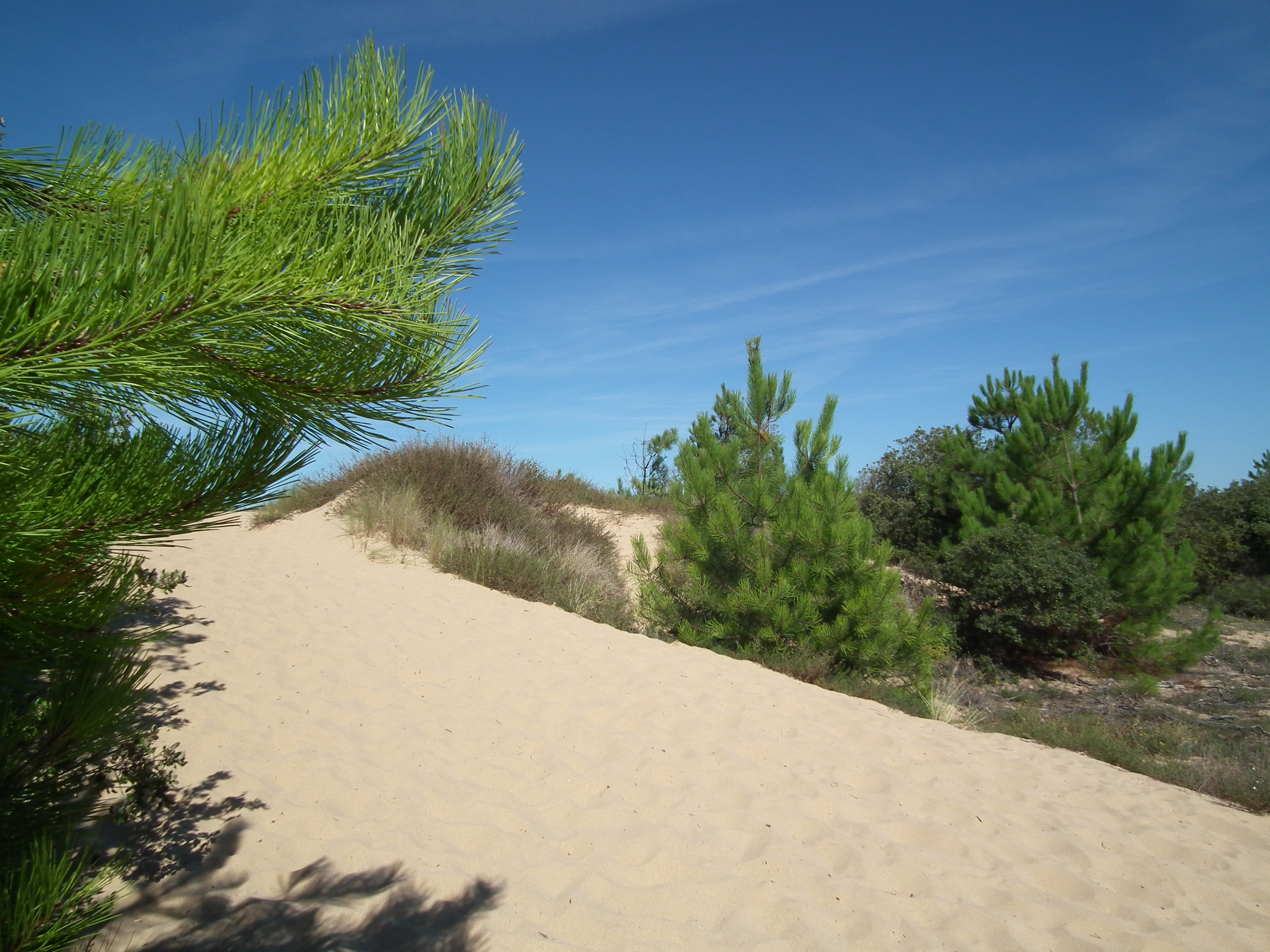
Sand dune on the Île d'Oléron in Charente-Maritime

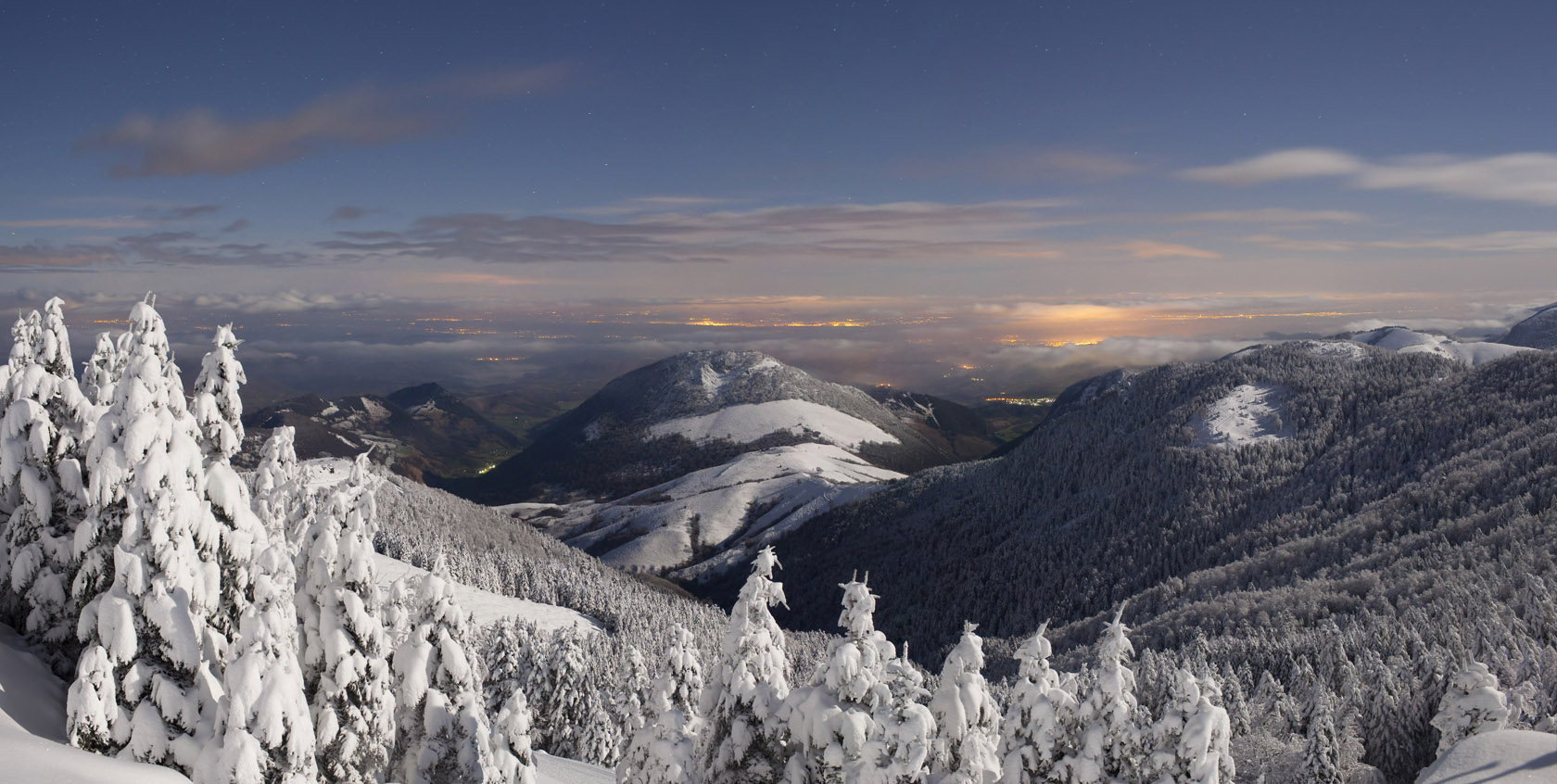
The Barétous Valley in Pyrénées-Atlantiques

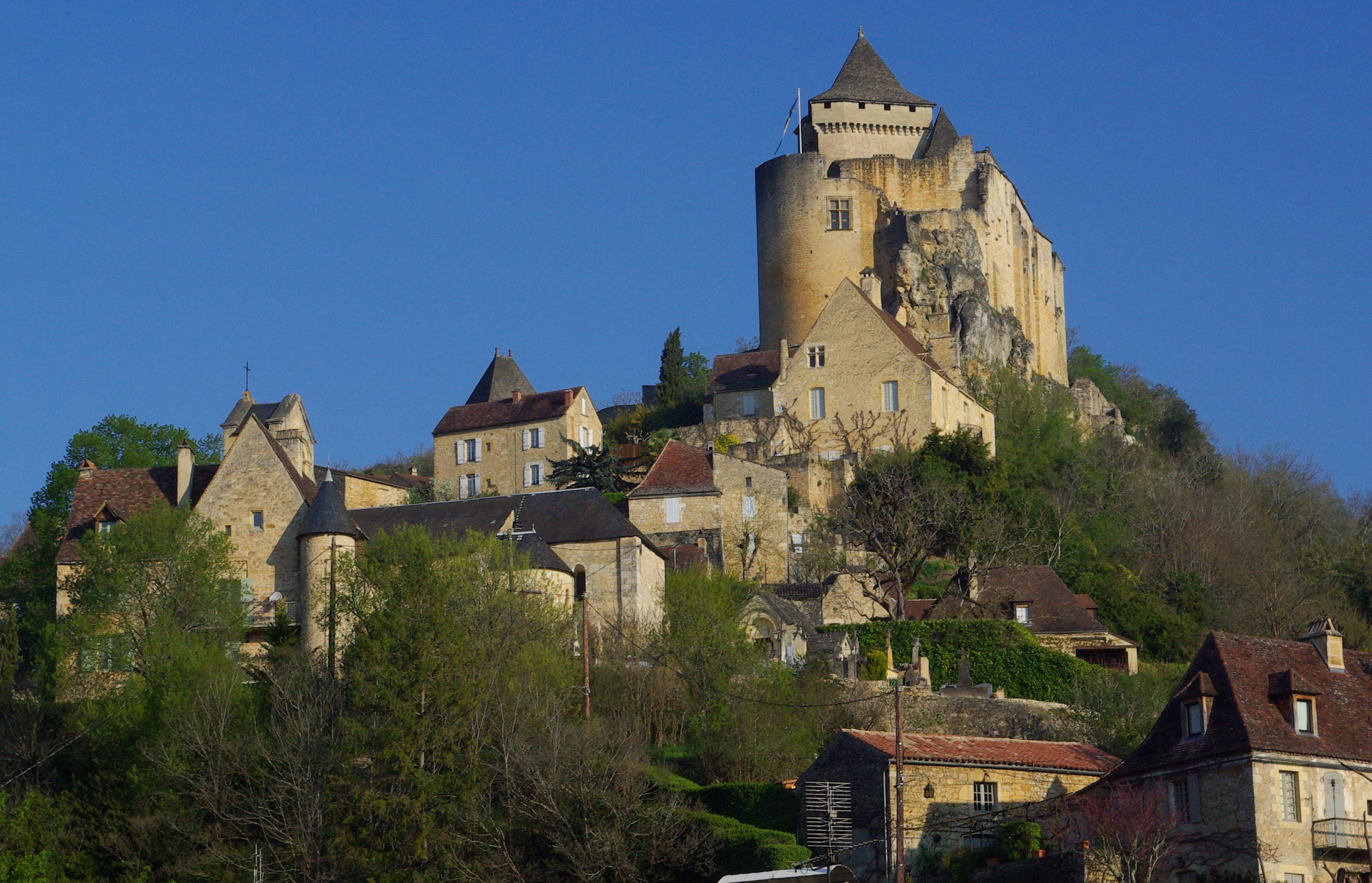
Medieval city of Castelnaud-la-Chapelle, Dordogne

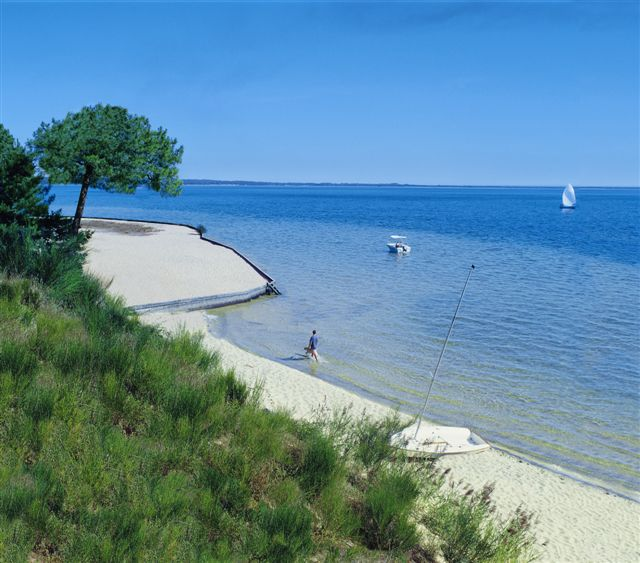
The main lake of Biscarrosse, Landes

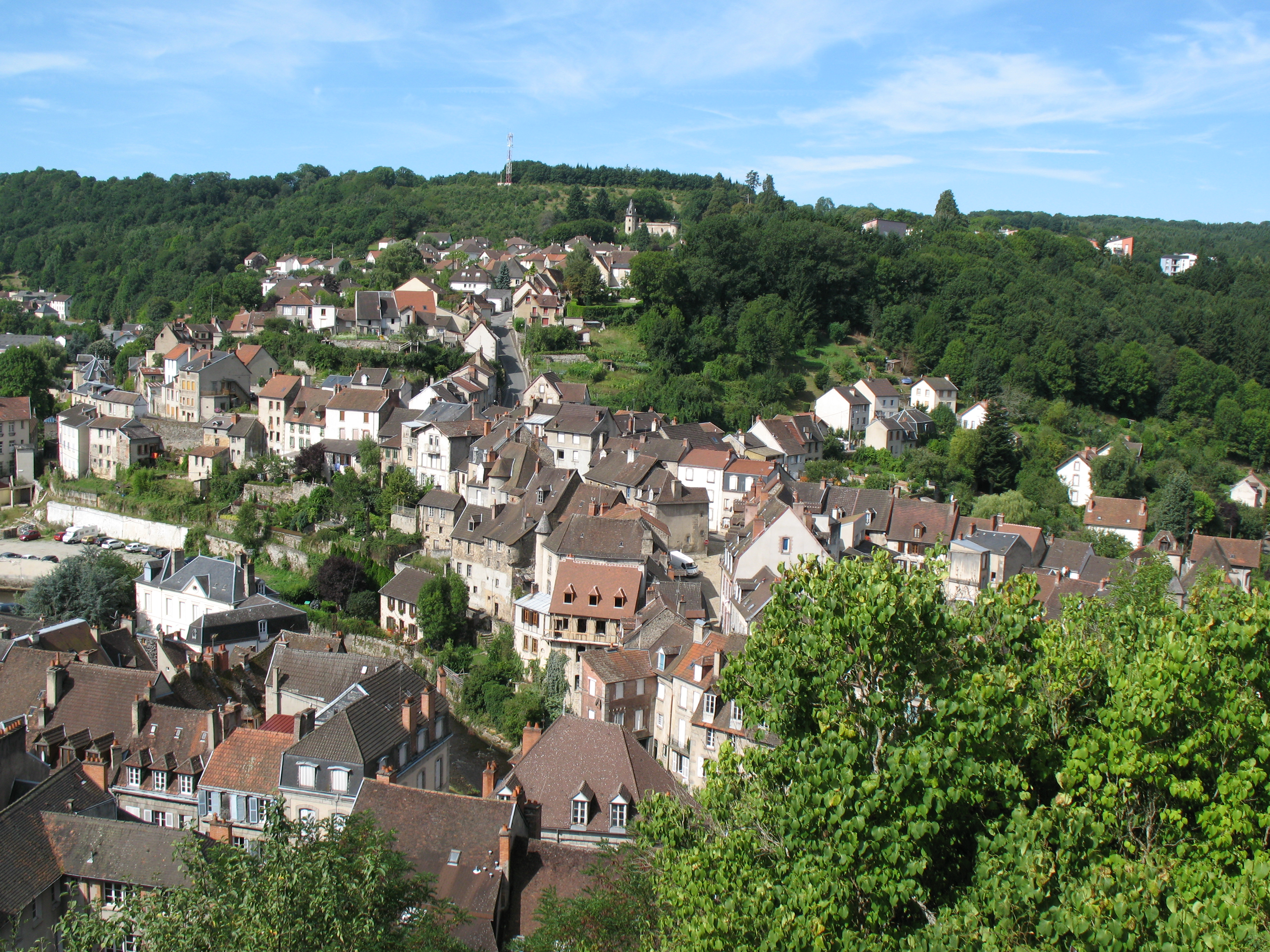
Old town of Aubusson in Creuse

== Languages ==
In 2008, the region Aquitaine made a survey on the languages in the region, and gave the following results.

Languages in Aquitaine, 2008
Language	Native speakers	All speakers
French	86.1%	91.8%
English	8.7%	58.7%
Spanish	2.8%	44.1%
Occitan and other regional languages	0.6%	16.1%
German	0.4%	8.3%
Italian	0.3%	5.1%
Arabic	0.3%	2.9%
Basque	0.1%	1.7%
Other languages	0.7%	7.6%
Total	100.0%	236.3%

== Climate ==
The climate of Nouvelle-Aquitaine is classified as an oceanic climate under the Köppen climate classification scheme. The climates within the region can be sub-classified as follows:

- The Aquitaine oceanic climate, which includes a majority of the region from Charentes to Landes
- The Paris oceanic climate, in Poitou
- The Limousin oceanic climate, in Limousin
- The Basque microclimate, in the Basque Country
- The Pyrenean climate, which varies with altitude

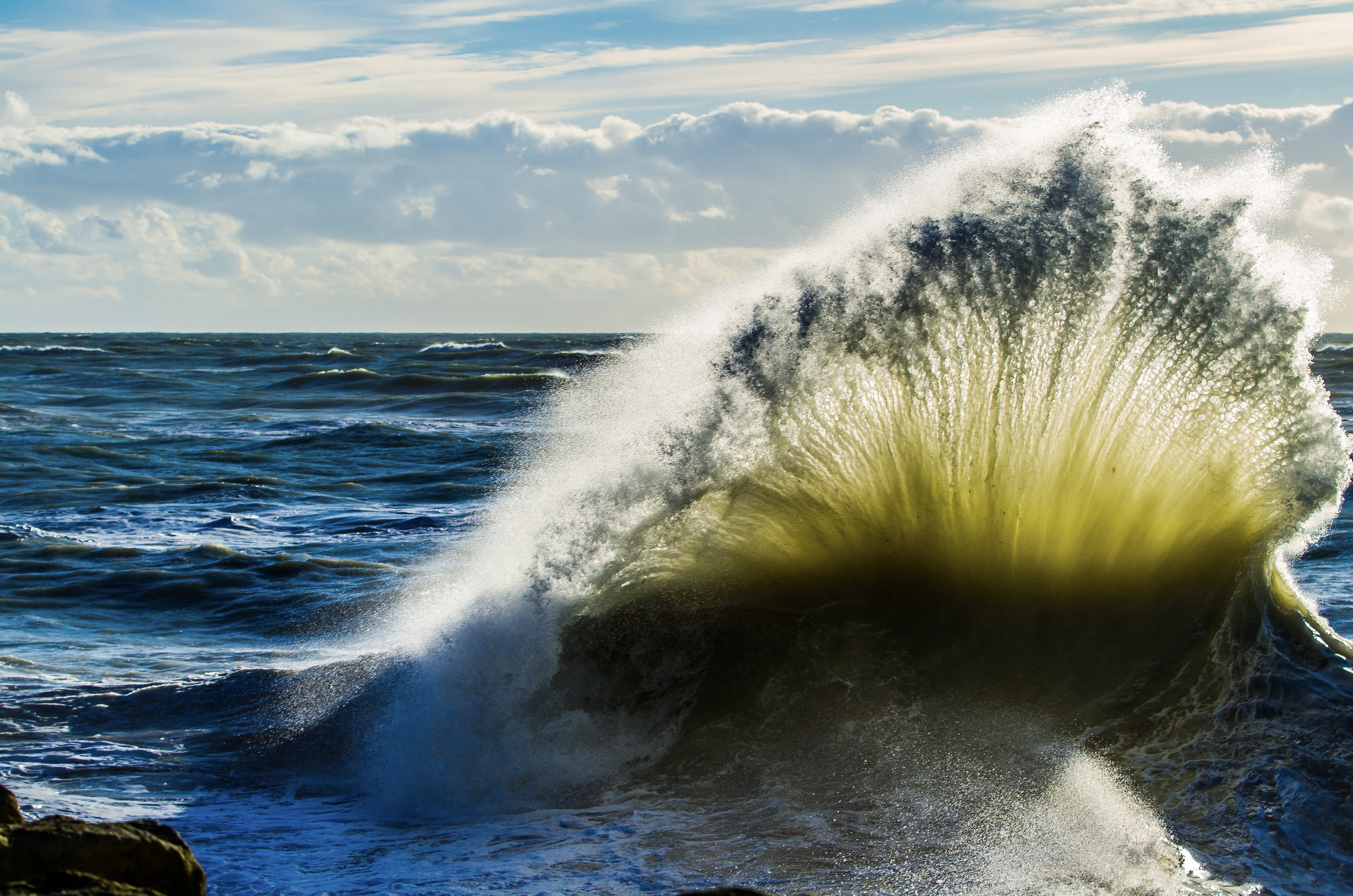
Wave at Saint-Clément-des-Baleines, on the Île de Ré (Charente-Maritime).

In the north of the region, the Paris oceanic climate is marked by moderate rainfall, warm summers and cool winters, but moderately so. The Seuil du Poitou acts as a relative climatic barrier and regions further south belong to the Aquitaine oceanic climate area. Coastal areas are wetter overall, with moderate rainfall spread throughout the year, except for the summer months, where droughts are not uncommon. Summer, which is relatively warm, is tempered by sea breezes, and winters are cool-mild. Frosts and snow are unusual. Sunshine is quite high, with around 2,000 to 2,200 hours per year, which is comparable to some Mediterranean regions (Perpignan). Summer precipitation often take the form of thunderstorms, possibly violent, while winter is sometimes marked by storms, some of which have marked the area with their exceptional: Martin in 1999 (record of 198 km / h in Saint-Denis-d'Oléron), Klaus in 2009 (172 km / h to Biscarrosse) and Xynthia in 2010 (160 km / h on the Île de Ré).

The climate in Angoumois and Limousin is wetter and cooler, remains temperate with warm spring and has relatively warm summers, with variations due to altitude. The annual sunshine averages at 1850 hours. The climate of the Basque country and southern Landes is marked by its warm summers, mild winters but especially by its high rainfall, with Atlantic depressions that hit the Pyrenean foothills. This Microclimate explains the presence of lush vegetation and the green aspect of the region. Fogs are not rare, but usually dissipate very quickly.

As for the Pyrenean climate, suboceanic trend Béarn, it is subject to frequent "cap effect" when the north-west of disturbances abut against the Pyrenean mountains. Valley bottoms, true "funnels clouds" are particularly watered. The winter snow is important above 1200 meters. Pau valley has a microclimate, however, marked by strong sunlight (about 1900 hours a year) but high rainfall (1100 mm per year) and a near absence of frost in winter. Rainfall is usually brief there, but regular, and spread throughout the year.

Climate data for Bordeaux (BOD), elevation: 47 m (154 ft), 1991–2020 normals, extremes 1920–present
Month	Jan	Feb	Mar	Apr	May	Jun	Jul	Aug	Sep	Oct	Nov	Dec	Year
Record high °C (°F)	20.8 (69.4)	26.2 (79.2)	27.7 (81.9)	31.1 (88.0)	35.4 (95.7)	40.5 (104.9)	41.2 (106.2)	40.7 (105.3)	37.0 (98.6)	32.2 (90.0)	26.7 (80.1)	22.5 (72.5)	41.2 (106.2)
Mean daily maximum °C (°F)	10.5 (50.9)	12.0 (53.6)	15.5 (59.9)	18.0 (64.4)	21.7 (71.1)	25.0 (77.0)	27.1 (80.8)	27.6 (81.7)	24.2 (75.6)	19.6 (67.3)	14.1 (57.4)	11.0 (51.8)	18.9 (66.0)
Daily mean °C (°F)	7.1 (44.8)	7.8 (46.0)	10.7 (51.3)	13.0 (55.4)	16.6 (61.9)	19.8 (67.6)	21.7 (71.1)	21.9 (71.4)	18.8 (65.8)	15.2 (59.4)	10.4 (50.7)	7.7 (45.9)	14.2 (57.6)
Mean daily minimum °C (°F)	3.7 (38.7)	3.6 (38.5)	5.8 (42.4)	8.0 (46.4)	11.4 (52.5)	14.6 (58.3)	16.2 (61.2)	16.3 (61.3)	13.3 (55.9)	10.7 (51.3)	6.7 (44.1)	4.4 (39.9)	9.6 (49.3)
Record low °C (°F)	−16.4 (2.5)	−14.8 (5.4)	−9.9 (14.2)	−5.3 (22.5)	−1.8 (28.8)	2.5 (36.5)	5.2 (41.4)	4.7 (40.5)	−1.8 (28.8)	−5.3 (22.5)	−7.3 (18.9)	−13.4 (7.9)	−16.4 (2.5)
Average precipitation mm (inches)	86.9 (3.42)	66.9 (2.63)	63.3 (2.49)	75.6 (2.98)	71.1 (2.80)	70.4 (2.77)	48.6 (1.91)	56.7 (2.23)	81.2 (3.20)	83.3 (3.28)	114.5 (4.51)	106.4 (4.19)	924.9 (36.41)
Average precipitation days (≥ 1.0 mm)	12.2	10.1	10.7	11.2	10.0	8.3	7.1	7.0	9.3	10.7	13.3	12.7	122.5
Mean monthly sunshine hours	89.8	117.4	170.2	186.0	220.8	237.7	256.0	248.8	208.8	150.3	100.0	84.1	2,069.8
Source: Meteo France

Climate data for Bordeaux (Bordeaux–Mérignac Airport), elevation: 47 m or 154 ft, 1961–1990 normals and extremes
Month	Jan	Feb	Mar	Apr	May	Jun	Jul	Aug	Sep	Oct	Nov	Dec	Year
Record high °C (°F)	19.1 (66.4)	25.0 (77.0)	27.7 (81.9)	28.6 (83.5)	32.6 (90.7)	37.0 (98.6)	38.8 (101.8)	38.3 (100.9)	37.0 (98.6)	31.5 (88.7)	24.7 (76.5)	22.5 (72.5)	38.8 (101.8)
Mean maximum °C (°F)	12.6 (54.7)	16.3 (61.3)	17.1 (62.8)	19.5 (67.1)	25.3 (77.5)	29.3 (84.7)	29.2 (84.6)	29.4 (84.9)	27.0 (80.6)	21.4 (70.5)	16.1 (61.0)	14.4 (57.9)	29.4 (84.9)
Mean daily maximum °C (°F)	9.9 (49.8)	11.1 (52.0)	13.4 (56.1)	16.1 (61.0)	19.4 (66.9)	23.2 (73.8)	25.9 (78.6)	25.5 (77.9)	24.0 (75.2)	19.3 (66.7)	13.2 (55.8)	10.0 (50.0)	17.6 (63.7)
Daily mean °C (°F)	6.2 (43.2)	7.5 (45.5)	8.7 (47.7)	11.2 (52.2)	14.2 (57.6)	17.7 (63.9)	20.2 (68.4)	19.6 (67.3)	17.9 (64.2)	14.3 (57.7)	9.1 (48.4)	6.6 (43.9)	12.8 (55.0)
Mean daily minimum °C (°F)	2.5 (36.5)	3.6 (38.5)	4.2 (39.6)	6.3 (43.3)	9.1 (48.4)	12.4 (54.3)	14.3 (57.7)	13.9 (57.0)	12.2 (54.0)	9.2 (48.6)	4.7 (40.5)	3.2 (37.8)	8.0 (46.3)
Mean minimum °C (°F)	−3.1 (26.4)	−1.8 (28.8)	−0.1 (31.8)	3.7 (38.7)	7.8 (46.0)	9.4 (48.9)	12.4 (54.3)	12.6 (54.7)	9.2 (48.6)	5.3 (41.5)	2.0 (35.6)	−0.4 (31.3)	−3.1 (26.4)
Record low °C (°F)	−16.4 (2.5)	−13.2 (8.2)	−9.9 (14.2)	−3.0 (26.6)	−0.5 (31.1)	4.0 (39.2)	6.9 (44.4)	6.0 (42.8)	2.2 (36.0)	−1.7 (28.9)	−7.3 (18.9)	−13.0 (8.6)	−16.4 (2.5)
Average precipitation mm (inches)	92.4 (3.64)	86.9 (3.42)	74.0 (2.91)	69.4 (2.73)	67.4 (2.65)	51.3 (2.02)	41.2 (1.62)	45.3 (1.78)	72.0 (2.83)	67.8 (2.67)	96.7 (3.81)	79.7 (3.14)	844.1 (33.22)
Average precipitation days (≥ 1.0 mm)	13.1	11.5	11.7	11.2	11.1	8.5	6.7	8.3	9.0	10.1	11.9	12.3	125.4
Average snowy days	1.1	1.2	0.6	0.0	0.0	0.0	0.0	0.0	0.0	0.0	0.2	0.8	3.9
Average relative humidity (%)	88	84	78	76	77	76	75	76	79	85	87	88	80.8
Mean monthly sunshine hours	86.3	108.8	161.9	189.6	211.1	242.2	276.3	248.7	207.1	165.4	103.2	83.0	2,083.6
Percentage possible sunshine	31	38	45	47	47	53	59	58	56	49	36	31	46
Source 1: NOAA
Source 2: Infoclimat.fr (humidity)

== Transport ==
Nouvelle-Aquitaine is a region of transit between the Paris Basin (including Île-de-France) and the Iberian Peninsula, but also between the Rhône Valley and the Atlantic and Mediterranean regions (noon Toulouse). This situation implies several years developing roads and major highways, especially in the context of the road Estuaries, but also the high-speed Paris-Bordeaux-Toulouse-Spain, which should help significantly shorten rail journeys.

=== Roads and highways ===
Many roads and highways in the region radiate from Bordeaux and just attach to its peripheral belt (Bordeaux ring road or A630). The main lines used for reinforcing roads and highways are in addition some terminal bonds designed to streamline access to two major resorts in the area, Arcachon (via Highway A660) and Royan (by via the N150, partly making 2X2 routes).

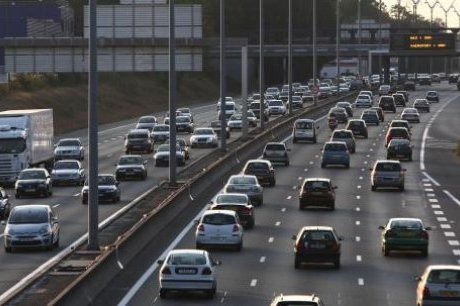
The ring road of Bordeaux supports a particularly heavy traffic.

The A10 autoroute (the "Aquitaine") is the major artery between Bordeaux and Paris, commissioned in 1981. It is part of the network of "autoroutes du Sud de la France" and provides access to several cities: Saintes, Niort or Poitiers. From Saintes, highway A837 allows drivers to reach the town of Rochefort. Further north, in Niort, an interchange provides access to the A83 motorway, the Vendée and Nantes (Pays de la Loire). The N10 is the main road of the Charente and an important road for connecting between Bordeaux and Poitiers including Angoulême.

Connecting the east of Bordeaux (Libourne) to Greater Lyon, the A89 motorway (called "La transversale") irrigates the eastern part of the region, facilitating travel between the cities of Bordeaux and Périgueux, Brive-la-Gaillarde, Tulle and Ussel. A little further south, the D936, which roughly follows the course of the Dordogne, is grafted on the Bordeaux ring road via an interchange at the municipalities of Cenon and Floirac. It gives access to the towns of Branne, Castillon-la-Bataille and Sainte-Foy-la-Grande (Gironde) and Bergerac (Dordogne).

The A89 mark on the Chavanon Viaduct in Corrèze.

Southwest of Bordeaux, the A63 is a major focus of the regional motorway network. Forming a large artery almost straight through the vast expanses of flat Landes de Gascogne, it crosses the south of Gironde and Landes (passes near Dax but avoids the prefecture, Mont-de-Marsan) before joining Bayonne and the Basque Country, to Irun, on the Spanish border, the main border crossing. The other border crossings, less frequented but less direct, are the Somport tunnel and Col du Pourtalet.

The Basque Country and Béarn are also served by a road parallel to the Pyrenees, which facilitates access to Toulouse and the Mediterranean regions: the A64, called "La Pyrénéenne". It starts from Briscous (in the outskirts of Bayonne), continues to Pau before reaching Tarbes in the neighbouring region of Occitania) and the Toulouse ring road.

The eastern region is well served by the A20 north–south axis between Paris and Toulouse and opens up Limousin. It thus goes through La Souterraine, Limoges and Brive-la-Gaillarde. Another important way, the European route E603 connects Limoges to Angoulême and Saintes. It represents one of the key elements of the road Central Europe Atlantic important channel of communication between the Rhône Valley and the Atlantic coast, which is divided into multiple plots at Angoulême and Saintes (Bordeaux, Royan and La Rochelle).

=== Rail network ===
The regional rail network is organised around the main towns: Bordeaux, Limoges, Poitiers, La Rochelle and Bayonne. The main line is the one between Paris and Madrid via Poitiers, Bordeaux and Hendaye; then comes the line Lille-Brive-la-Gaillarde, which serves Limoges, both served by TGV trains. Other lines are served mostly by the TER network of TER Nouvelle-Aquitaine.

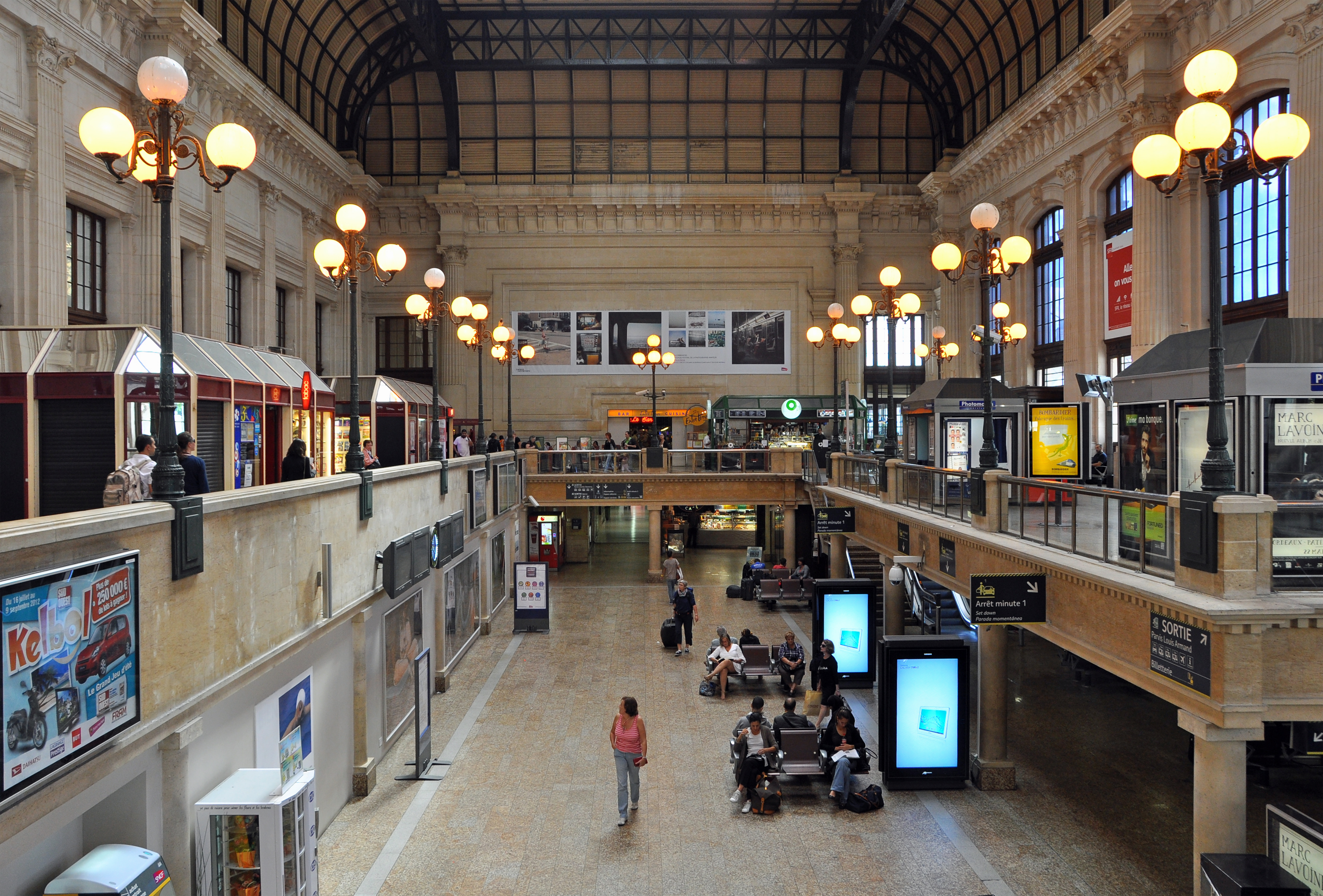
With 10 million passengers a year, the Bordeaux-Saint-Jean station is the largest station in the region.

The largest station in the region is Bordeaux-Saint-Jean, which accommodates 10 million passengers per year; then comes Limoges-Bénédictins station and its 2.5 million passengers. Poitiers has two stations: Poitiers station and Futuroscope station which serves the technology park Futuroscope. Angoulême station sees around 1.45 million passengers per year; Agen station links the Occitania region; Pau station, Dax station.

The implementation of the LGV Sud Europe Atlantique, which is part of a priority program initiated by the state.

Another important project for the region, the LGV Bordeaux–Spain extends of the South Europe Atlantic TGV line to connect with the Basque Y (high-speed line linking the Spanish cities of Bilbao, Vitoria, San Sebastian and Irun). It is part of the great South West Rail project and should facilitate regional connections between Bordeaux, Mont-de-Marsan, Dax, Bayonne, long-distance connections between the south of the region and Île-de-France, as well as international links to Spain (including Madrid).

The LGV Bar project between Poitiers and Limoges is part of this context, and should significantly shorten travel between the two cities (from just over an hour and a half to 45 minutes), facilitate interregional connections and access to Île-de-France. This project is one of the links of "Transline project" (Transversal Auvergne Atlantic Alpes), still under study.

=== Airports ===
The region benefits from the presence of several airport infrastructure. The main airport is Bordeaux-Merignac, world class, which hosts nearly four and a half million passengers per year and offers flights to many destinations; It is the seventh metropolitan France Airport (fifth if we except the Paris airports).

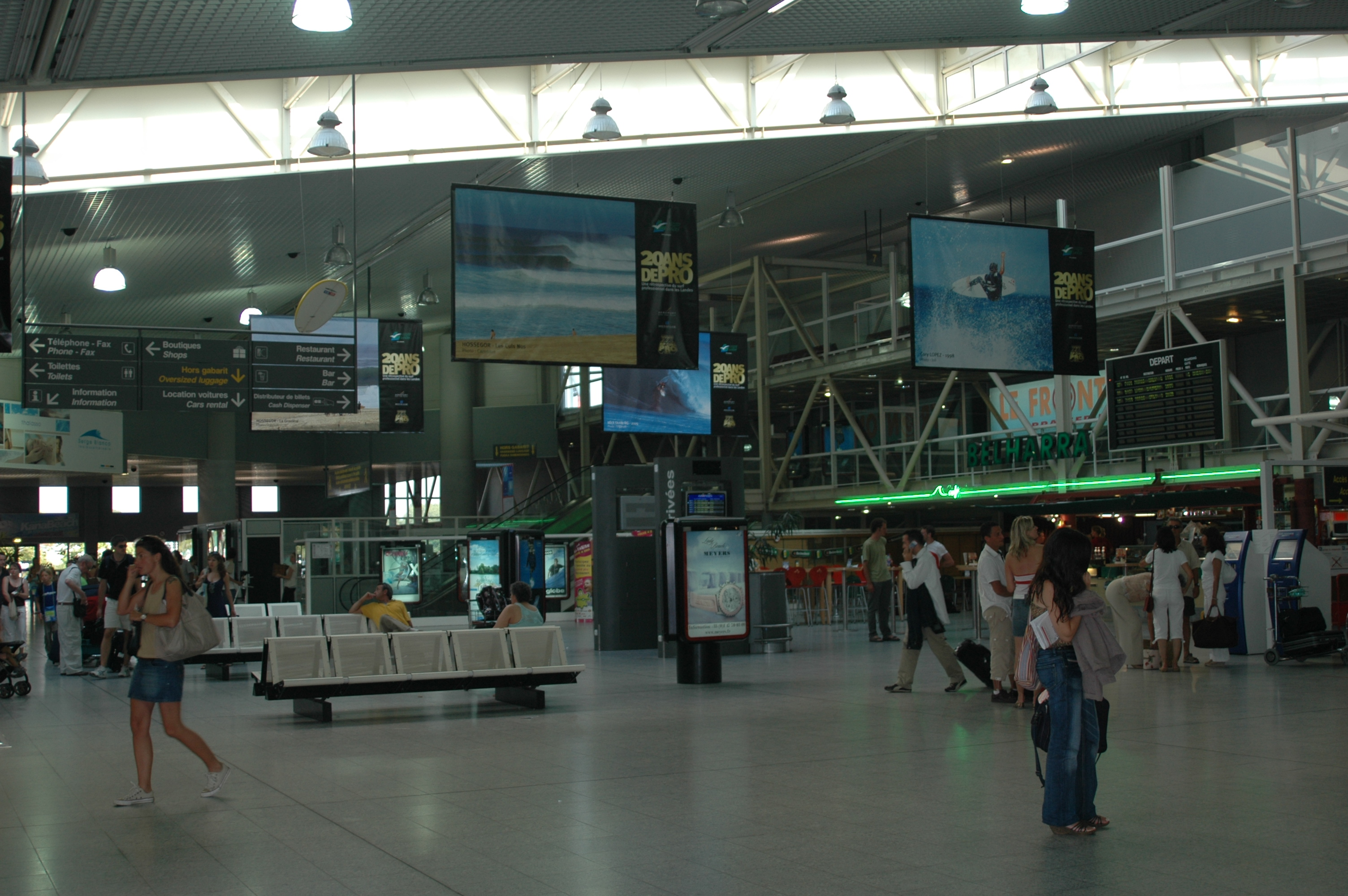
The terminal of the Biarritz-Anglet-Bayonne Airport, which has the second greatest attendance in the region.

The second airport is Biarritz-Anglet-Bayonne, third is Pau Pyrénées Airport, then Limoges-Bellegarde, and Bergerac Dordogne Périgord Airport.

The airport of La Rochelle - Île de Ré offers flights to several French and European cities. Smaller, airports Poitiers-Biard, Brive Dordogne, Agen-La Garenne and Périgueux-Bassillac offer mainly domestic flights. Airports Angoulême-Cognac and Rochefort-Charente-Maritime are only turned to business flights in the absence of regular commercial lines.

=== Harbours ===
Cruise ships mostly dock in the ports of La Rochelle (terminal La Pallice), Verdon-sur-Mer (shuttles for Royan), Pauillac, Bordeaux and Bayonne.

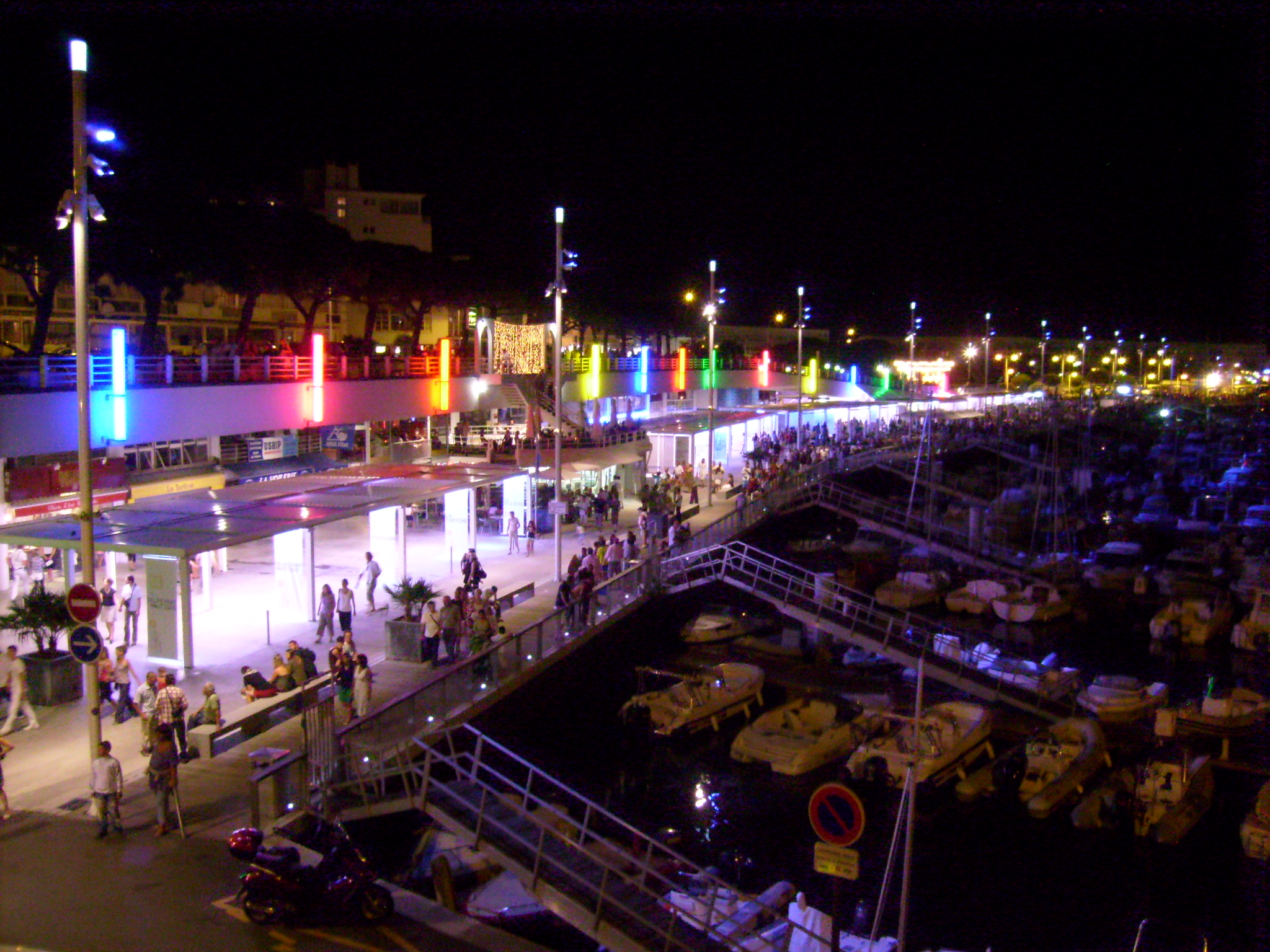
Royan harbour by night.

Many marinas are open to smaller boats. The main ones are those of La Rochelle (4800 rings), Arcachon (2600 rings), Port-Médoc (1200 rings), Royan (1000 rings), of Capbreton (950 rings), Hendaye (800 rings), Saint-Denis-d'Oléron (750 rings) and Anglet-Biarritz (425 rings).

River transport is active on several rivers in the region: Charente (mainly between Rochefort and Angoulême), Gironde estuary, Garonne, Dordogne, Lot, Baise and Adour.

Landmark river tourism, the Canal de Garonne is an extension of the Canal du Midi (which together form the "Canal des Deux-Mers" between the Atlantic and the Mediterranean). It passes including Agen (Agen aqueduct) and continues until Castets-en-Dorthe (Gironde).

The entire watershed of the Dordogne is classified as a biosphere reserve by UNESCO since 11 July 2012 with the co-ordination structure Institution of regional public Dordogne basin. The basin of the Dordogne is one of the few places in France where the presence of eight migratory fish species proved with Atlantic salmon, sea trout, river lamprey, sea lamprey, Allis shad, shad feigned, eel, and sturgeon in Europe. Other species associated with water, such as the common otter and the European mink, or the penny whistle swimming, are also present.

Two water agencies (Adour-Garonne and Loire-Bretagne) are involved in water management in the region.

== Economy ==
The Gross domestic product (GDP) of the region was 177.0 billion euros in 2018, accounting for 7.5% of French economic output. GDP per capita adjusted for purchasing power was 26,500 euros or 88% of the EU27 average in the same year. The GDP per employee was 101% of the EU average.

The economy of the region is based on several pillars: diversified agriculture, a set of famous vineyards (Bordeaux wine, brandies of Cognac and Armagnac), but also a decisive role in the industry sectors aerospace, defence, biotechnology, chemistry and more generally for scientific research, relying on a network of universities and Grandes Ecoles.

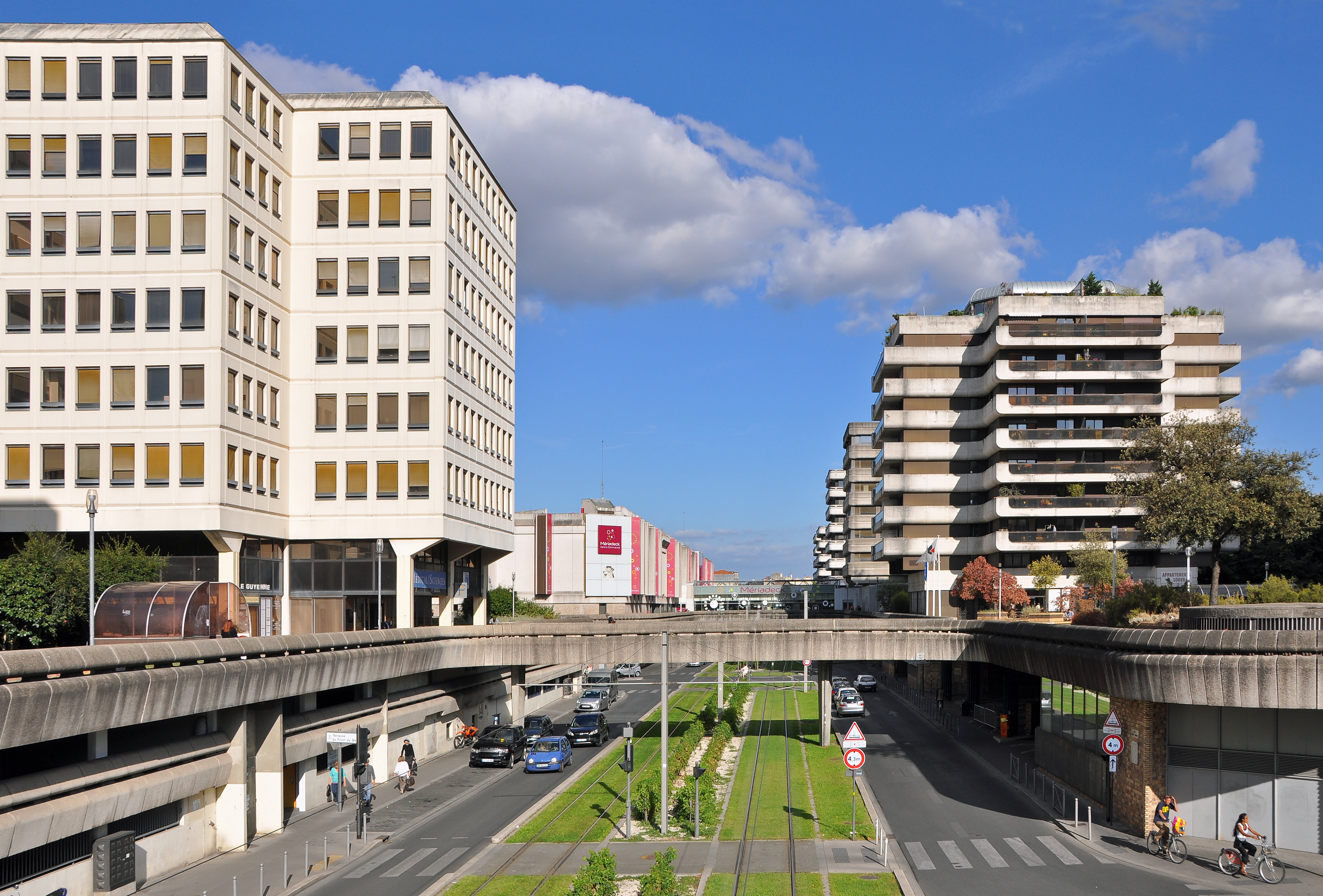
The business district of Mériadeck at Bordeaux, remained on a human scale.

Nouvelle-Aquitaine can also count on a large image and digital sector ("Campus de l'Image" of Angoulême, future "Cité Numérique" of Bègles), a dense network of small and medium enterprises, the presence in its territory of large agribusiness as well as a port network including three major commercial ports being balanced due to their geographical position (Grand Port maritime de La Rochelle in the north, Grand Port maritime de Bordeaux and port of Bayonne in the south).

=== Agricultural and wine sectors ===
An important rural Region, Nouvelle-Aquitaine has a varied agriculture. Cattle breeding (regional races: Limousin, Bordelais, Parthenais, Blonde d'Aquitaine, Gasconne, Bazadais and Béarnais) is predominant in the Bressuirais and Confolentais grove and in the Aunisienne plain, on the high Limousin plateau, in the Bazadaises and Chalossiennes Hills and is used both in the production of meat to milk production. There are also two other bovine regional breeds do not belong to the list of official French breeds (Marinelandaise and Betizu) endangered. The area has many quality labels ("Veau fermier élevé sous la mère", Limousin beef ...).

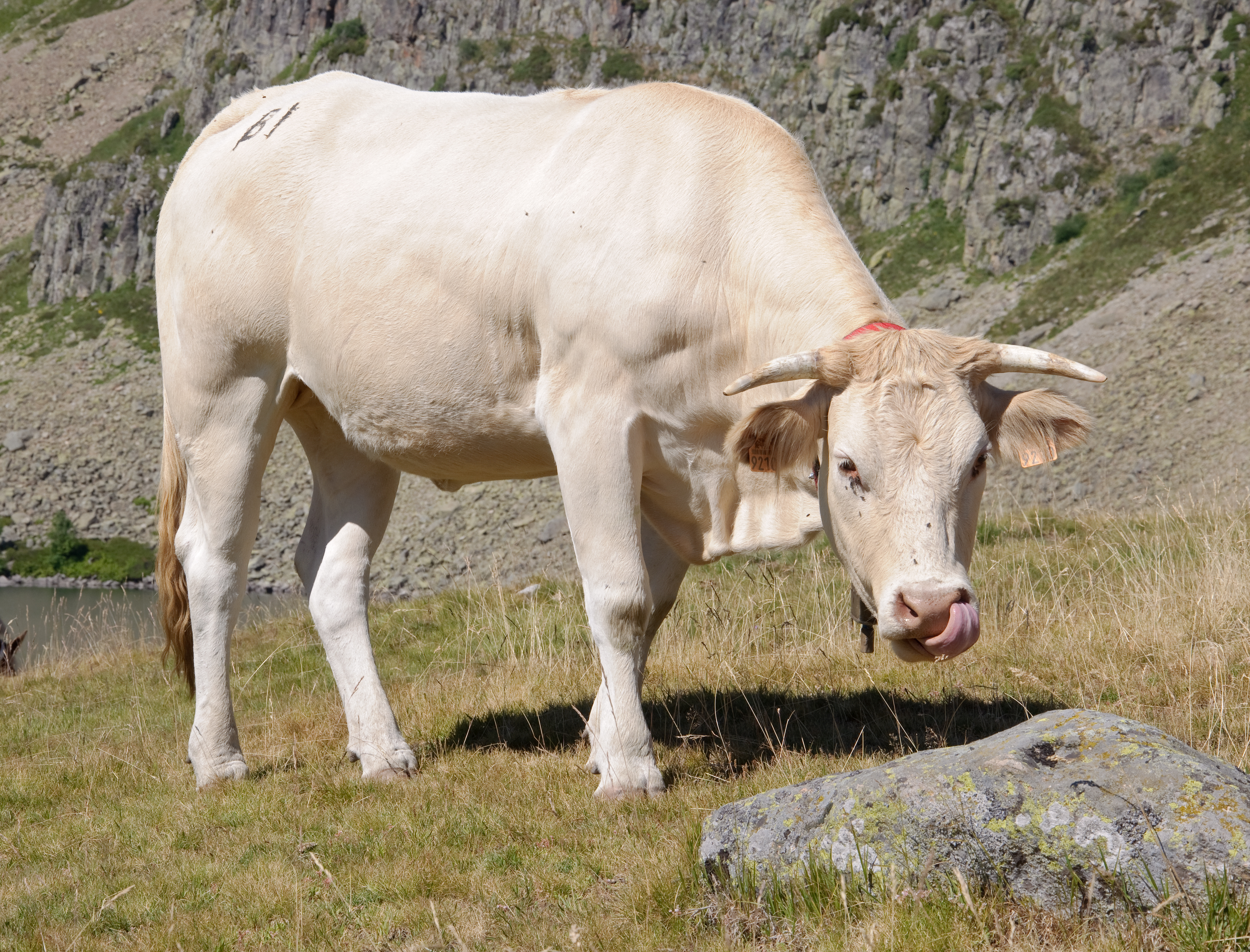
Blonde d'Aquitaine in the Pyrenees.

Goats (regional breeds: Poitevine, Pyrenees and Massif Central) are mainly concentrated in the north of the region (Charente, Charente-Maritime, Deux-Sèvres and Vienne) and are used for cheese production (chabichou, mothais sur feuille, jonchée). Some departments complement this area (Corrèze and Dordogne with a part of the production of Rocamadour AOC). Sheep farming (regional races: Basque-béarnaise, Landes, limousine, manech black head, red head and Xaxi Ardia) is well represented in the Limousin (Limousin lamb) the Charentes (lamb Poitou-Charentes), the Médoc (Pauillac lamb) and the Basque and Bearn Pyrenees.

Pig farming, which represents a significant part of the agri-food sector is distributed throughout the region (regional races: black ass Limousin, Gascon pork pie black Basque) and is guaranteed by the label "porc du Sud-Ouest ". The pigs in the region are used to produce many meat products, starting with the famous Bayonne ham. Many farms have also specialised in poultry production including yellow chicken Saint-Sever and poultry of Sèvres val (regional races Barbezieux, Limousin, Gascony, Landes and Marans) and fat waterfowl (mule ducks and geese), primarily designed for the production of foie gras and confit. Nouvelle-Aquitaine is the first European region for foie gras (more than half the French production). The label "Canard à foie gras du Sud-Ouest" occupies a large part of the region.

The region is the birthplace of many other breeds (regional donkey breeds: the Pyrenees and Poitou, regional equine: Poitevin mule, Landais and Pottock).

The area is also an important oyster production center, with oysters " de Claires" from Marennes-Oléron (in the estuary of the Seudre) and those of Arcachon and Cap Ferret and a stronghold of the mussel with mussels from Aiguillon Bay (near La Rochelle) and mussel Boyardville and Port-des-Barques.

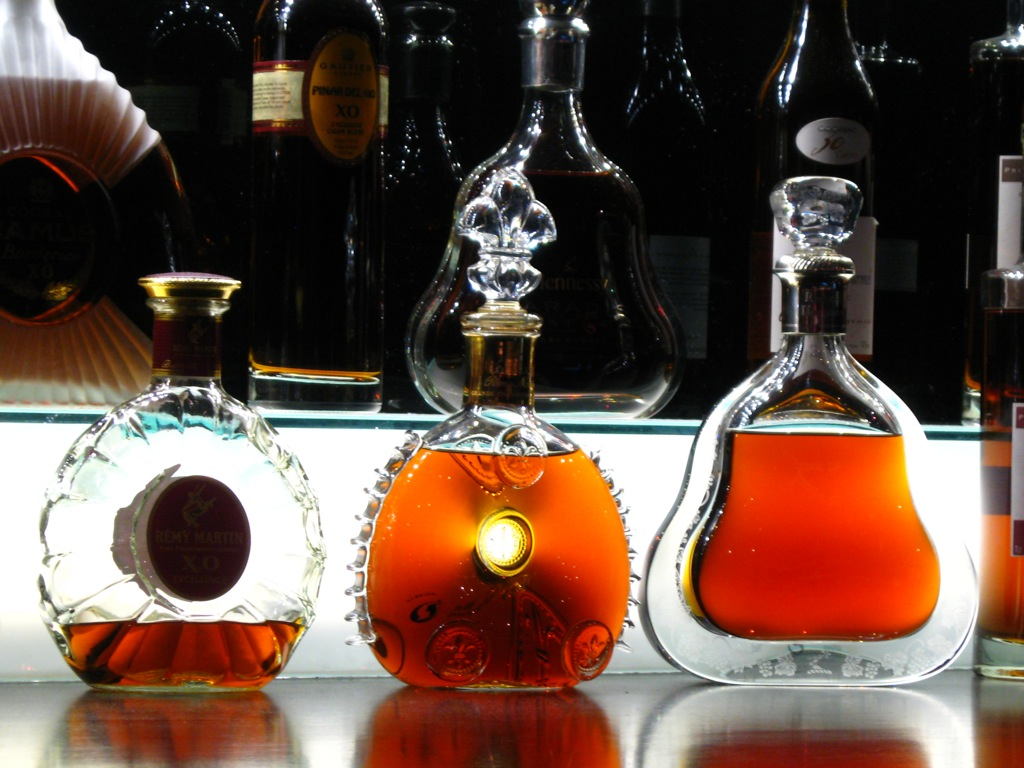
Cognac, one of two regional famous brandies with Armagnac.

Viticulture is a key sector of the local economy, the region is home to the vineyards of: Bordeaux, Bergerac, Cognac (production of Cognac and Pineau des Charentes) and partially, Armagnac (production of Armagnac and Floc de Gascogne), Southwest vineyards in the valleys of the Garonne and Lot, vineyard slopes of the Pyrenees (jurançon, irouléguy) and vineyards of Haut-Poitou. The vineyards of the Limousin provide wines (vineyards Verneuil-sur-Vienne and Correze vineyard, including giving the wine country and the Correze "vin paillé" of Queyssac-les-Vignes).

The region plays a vital role for cereal crops (wheat), herbage and oil (corn, sunflower), which bloom in the valleys of the Adour, Charente and the Garonne. Large agricultural cooperatives are located in the area: Lur Berri, Maïsadour, or Natea Charentes Alliance.

Tobacco production remains important in Langon area around La Réole, Auros, Monségur and Bazas (Gironde) in Bergerac, in Dordogne and in the Lot-et-Garonne. Mixed farming has led to the establishment of more localised cultures, but nevertheless considered: Périgord walnuts, Limousin apples, strawberries valleys of the Dordogne and Lot, Charentais melons hillsides, beans ("mojhettes") of val d'Arnoult and the Marais Poitevin, the Marmande tomatoes, peppers from Landes and the Basque Country, the Espelette pepper.

The agri-food sector is characterised by the presence of several national brands and international production sites, including Madrange (Limoges), Blédina (Brive-la-Gaillarde), Marie (Airvault and Mirebeau) Senoble (Aytré, near La Rochelle ), Lu (Cestas, near Bordeaux) Cémoi (Bègles, near Bordeaux), Charal (Égletons, in Corrèze), Valade Group (Lubersac, in Corrèze) or Lindt & Sprüngli (Oloron-Sainte-Marie). Labeyrie headquartered in Came in the Pyrénées-Atlantiques and Delpeyrat in Mont-de-Marsan, in the Landes.

=== Forest resources ===
The region has significant forest resources.

The timber industry consists of two main types of activities that mainly use the wood of the Landes forest and secondarily of the Dordogne, Creuse, Corrèze and Haute-Vienne. The primary processing industries (pulp, sawing, slicing, etc.) are very often the result of large companies to perform operations that require large investments. The secondary processing industries (paper / cardboard, furniture, woodwork and plywood, etc.) do not require as many resources. They are more dispersed geographically and in the hands of smaller-scale undertakings or craft.

=== Industries ===
The region is a major international center in the field of aeronautics and space industry. Together with the neighbouring region Occitania, it belongs to the Aerospace Valley world-class industry cluster. The regional aerospace sector is closely linked to the defence sector, leading to talk of industry "ASD" (aeronautics, space and defence).

The regional aircraft industry leads in business aircraft, high-tech batteries, high performance composite materials, landing gear systems and turbines for helicopters, the European leader for military aircraft, cockpit equipment and systems, ground tests and flight, launchers, solid propulsion, airborne radars and systems, weapons systems deterrence, atmospheric re-entry technology and national leader in the interior design of 'business aircraft, aircraft maintenance, UAV systems.

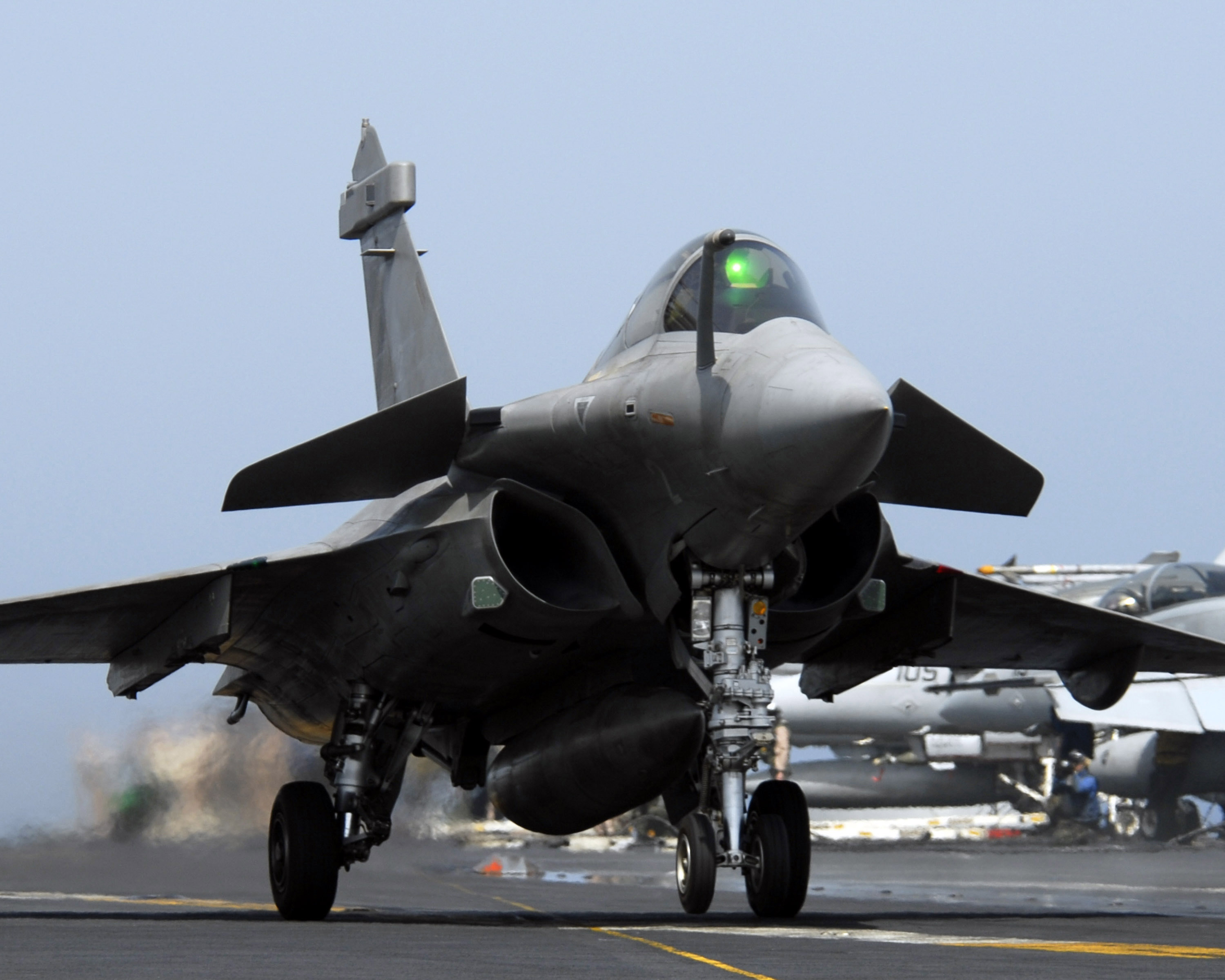
Many "Rafales" are assembled in Mérignac, in the Bordeaux metropolis.

The main sites are located in the city of Bordeaux, but also in the Pyrénées-Atlantiques and in Vienne. Of these, Dassault Aviation has five establishments in Mérignac (final assembly and commissioning flight Rafale and Falcon), Martignas-sur-Jalle (wing civilian and military aircraft), Biarritz (composites and assembly of structures), Cazaux (integration and armament test) and Poitiers (production of military aircraft canopy). Thales Group has two sites near Bordeaux: Pessac (aircraft embedded systems: mission computers, airborne radars combat and surveillance, unmanned aerial systems) and Hailsham (design and development of cockpit systems for major aircraft manufacturers in the world ). Airbus Defence and Space (development and production of Ariane launchers and of ballistic missiles for the French nuclear force) is located in Saint-Médard-en-Jalles. Safran has two major production facilities in the region: Turbomeca (world leader in helicopter turbines) near Pau and Snecma (maintenance and repair of military engines) in Châtellerault.

The region is also home to several military airbases, including a command center of the French Air Force. It also hosts major defence-related facilities such as the Megajoule laser and the main rocket testing facility of the Direction générale de l'armement.

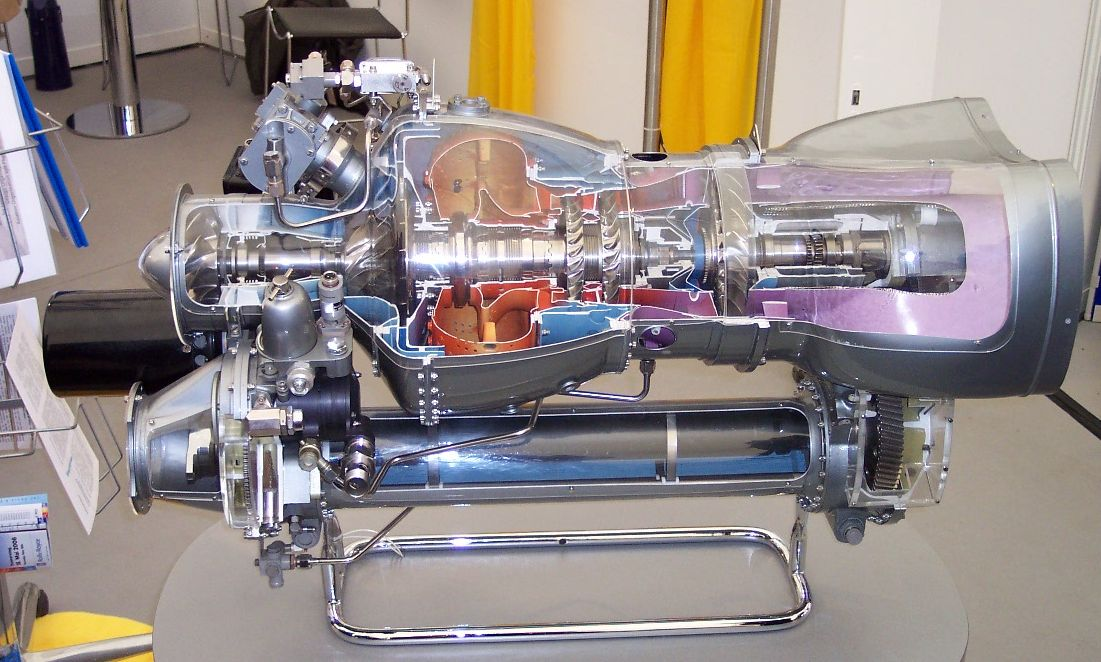
The Turbomeca Arriel turboshaft engine, manufactured in Bordes (Pyrénées-Atlantiques).

The pharmaceutical and parachemical industry is particularly well represented in the city of Bordeaux: Sanofi has three sites on the outskirts of Bordeaux, Ambarès-et-Lagrave (production) Floirac (IT) and Saint-Loubès (logistics); Meda Pharma Group is located in Mérignac; The Merck Group operates a production unit in Martillac. Finally, CEVA Animal Health in Libourne.

In Agen, there is the UPSA Company (scientific pharmacology Union applied), sold to the US group Bristol-Myers Squibb (BMS) in 1994. Two factories and a logistics platform allow the market to deliver the full range of analgesics from aspirin and paracetamol to morphine. Since 1994, the US group has invested regularly in its two Agenais units that deliver half of their export production.

Limoges, long specialised in manufacturing and luxury (shoes, porcelain ...), is now a major cluster in the field of ceramics research (European Ceramics Pole). Legrand, French industrial group historically based in Limoges in the Limousin, is a world leader in products and systems for electrical installations and information networks. Ester Technology Park, is a business and research center that develops north of the city on several areas: ceramics; materials and surface treatments; electronics, optics and telecommunications; Health biotechnology; water and environment; Engineering in association with the University of Limoges.

Niort has developed over many years a financial sector based economy (insurance).

The oil and gas industry is also represented in the region, with the Lacq gas field near Pau, which was France's main source of natural gas in the 1970s.

=== Tourism ===
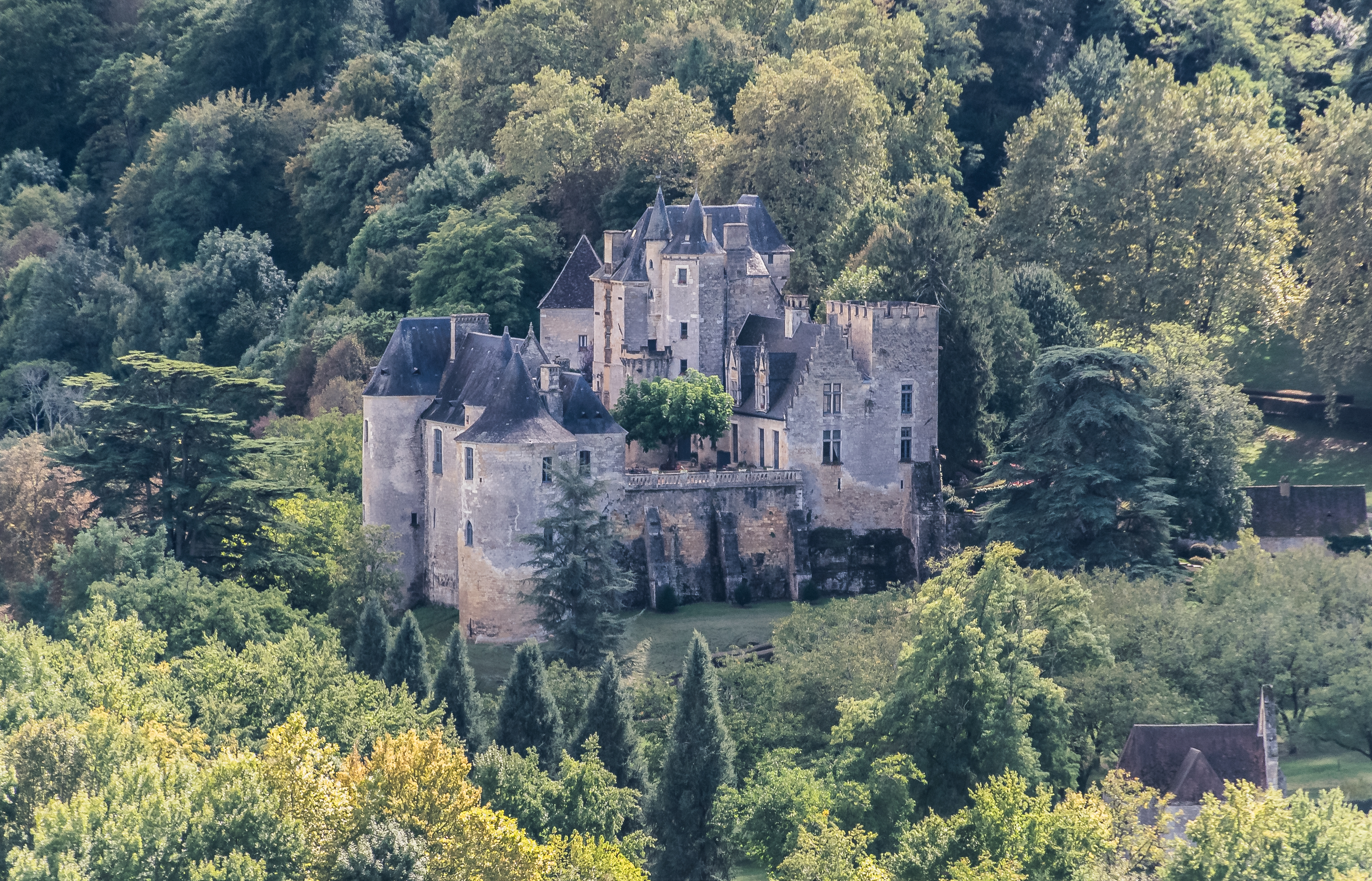
A view of the Castle of Fayrac in Castelnaud-la-Chapelle

Tourism is an important sector in a region with significant assets, starting with a mild and sunny climate, famous vineyards (wine tourism) and many heritage sites, some of international renown. Its wide ocean frontage, stormed by thousands of vacationers - and surfers - every summer is characterised by sandy beaches that often stretch to the horizon. Indirect consequence of increasingly popular for water sports, many surf-related brands (mainly clothing and equipment) are present in the region, earning him the nickname "Glissicon Valley" in reference to Silicon Valley: Rip Curl, Billabong, Quiksilver, O'Neill.

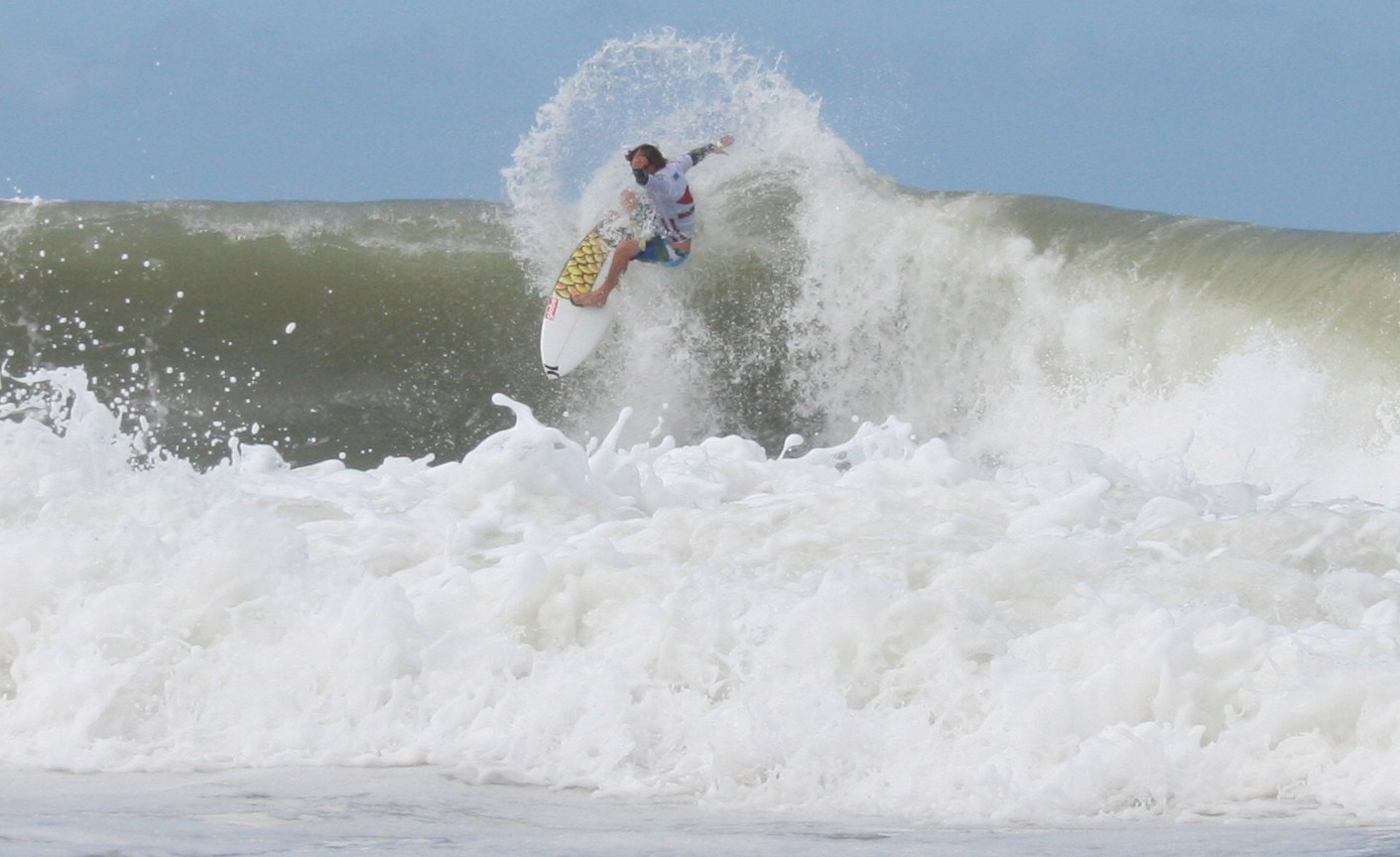
The "Surf culture" very present on the coast, here in Lacanau, is the reason of the establishment in the area of brands related to this sector (Rip Curl, Billabong)

In the northern part of the coast, the Charente archipelago consists mainly islands of Ré, Oléron and Aix, where alternate sheltered coves and beaches opening onto the open sea. The aunisiennes coast, near La Rochelle, greet some family seaside resorts such as Châtelaillon-Plage or Fouras. Further south, in the heart of the Côte de Beauté (Coast of Beauty), Royan is one of three major seaside resorts in the region. She has five beaches, not to mention those of neighbouring towns and the Côte Sauvage (Wild Coast) of the peninsula of Arvert, Mecca of surfing and board sports.

Beyond the Gironde estuary begins the Côte d’Argent (Silver Coast), large expanse of almost straight sand bordered by pine trees and large lakes Landes, punctuated by small resorts such as Soulac-sur-Mer, Vendays-Montalivet (famous for its naturist center) Hourtin, Lacanau, Biscarrosse, Mimizan, Hossegor or Capbreton. The Bassin d'Arcachon, which forms an indentation between Gironde and Landes coast, focuses on Arcachon, another seaside resort, nestled in the heart of the pine forest. It faces the Cap Ferret, beaten by the waves of the ocean. In continuation of the Côte d'Argent, the Basque coast is structured around Biarritz, Mecca of seaside tourism, Saint-Jean-de-Luz and Hendaye, and is famous for its eroded cliffs and powerful rollers which make it a favourite spot for surfers.

Winter sports enthusiasts are in the Pyrenean several stations where to practice skiing, snowboarding and snowblade. The main ones are Gourette, Artouste, La Pierre Saint-Martin, Issarbe, Le Somport, Iraty or Somport-Candanchu.

Many spas are located in the region, starting with Dax, but also Eaux-Bonnes, Eugénie-les-Bains, Saint-Paul-lès-Dax, Salies-de-Béarn, Cambo-les-Bains, Jonzac, Saujon, Rochefort, La Roche-Posay or Évaux-les-Bains.

== See also ==
- Aquitaine
- Limousin
- Poitou-Charentes
- Poitou
- Regions of France
- Aquitani people
- Coderc Plaza
- The Soufflaculs of Nontron
