= Meyrals =

- Commune
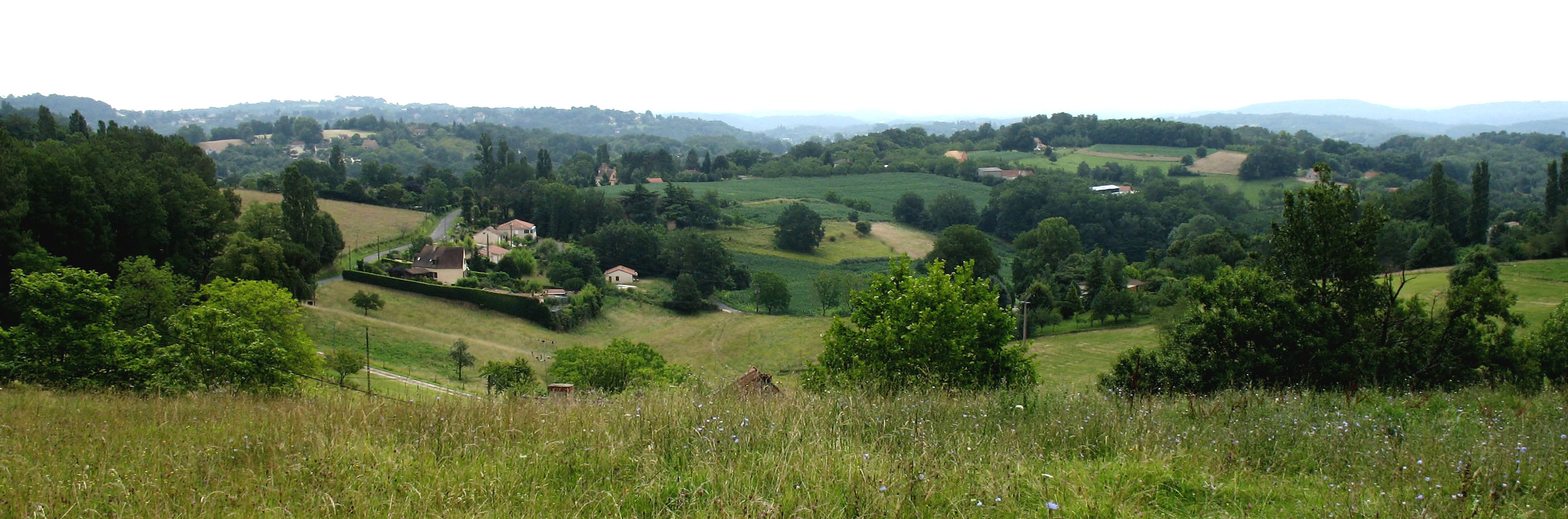
- A general view of Meyrals

- Coat of arms
- Location of Meyrals
- Location within France Location within Nouvelle-Aquitaine
- Coordinates: 44°53′59″N 1°03′53″E
- Country: France
- Region: Nouvelle-Aquitaine
- Department: Dordogne
- Arrondissement: Sarlat-la-Canéda
- Canton: Vallée Dordogne
- Intercommunality: Vallée de la Dordogne et Forêt Bessède

Government
  - Mayor (2020–2026): Joël Le Corre
- Area^{1}: 18.16 km^{2} (7.01 sq mi)
- Elevation: 150 m (490 ft)
- Highest elevation: 267 m (876 ft)
- Lowest elevation: 90 m (300 ft)
- Population (2023): 715
  - Density: 39.4/km^{2} (102/sq mi)
- Time zone: UTC+01:00 (CET)
  - Summer (DST): UTC+02:00 (CEST)
- INSEE/Postal code: 24268 /24220
- ^{1} French Land Register data, which excludes lakes, ponds, glaciers > 1 km^{2} (0.386 sq mi or 247 acres) and river estuaries.

Meyrals is a commune in the Dordogne department in the southwest of France.

Meyrals is in the Périgord and, specifically, the Périgord Noir (Black Périgord), in Nouvelle-Aquitaine.

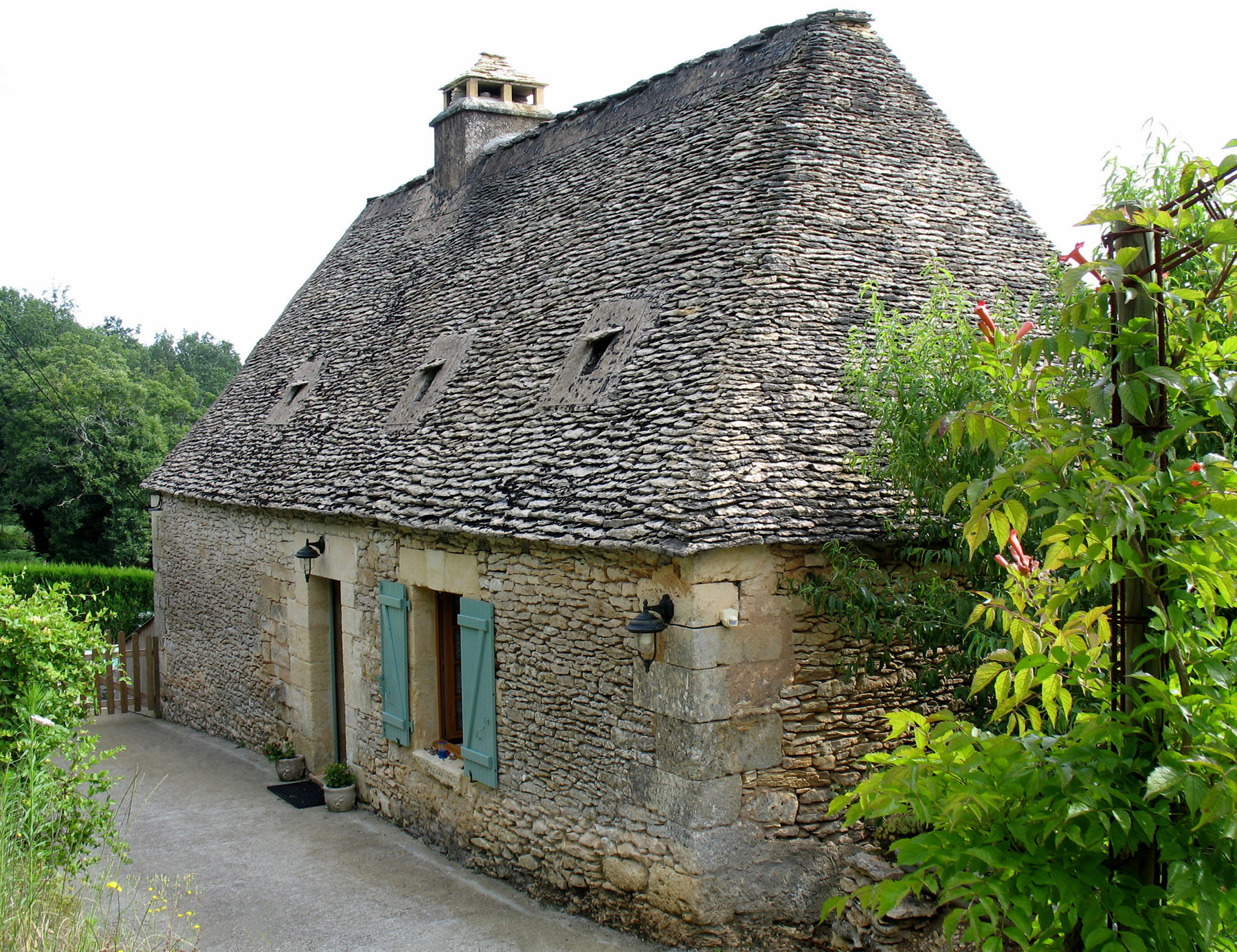
A stone house in Meyrals

== Population ==
Historical population
Year	Pop.	±% p.a.
1968	434	—
1975	368	−2.33%
1982	385	+0.65%
1990	417	+1.00%
1999	468	+1.29%
2007	536	+1.71%
2012	580	+1.59%
2017	641	+2.02%
2023	715	+1.84%
Source: INSEE

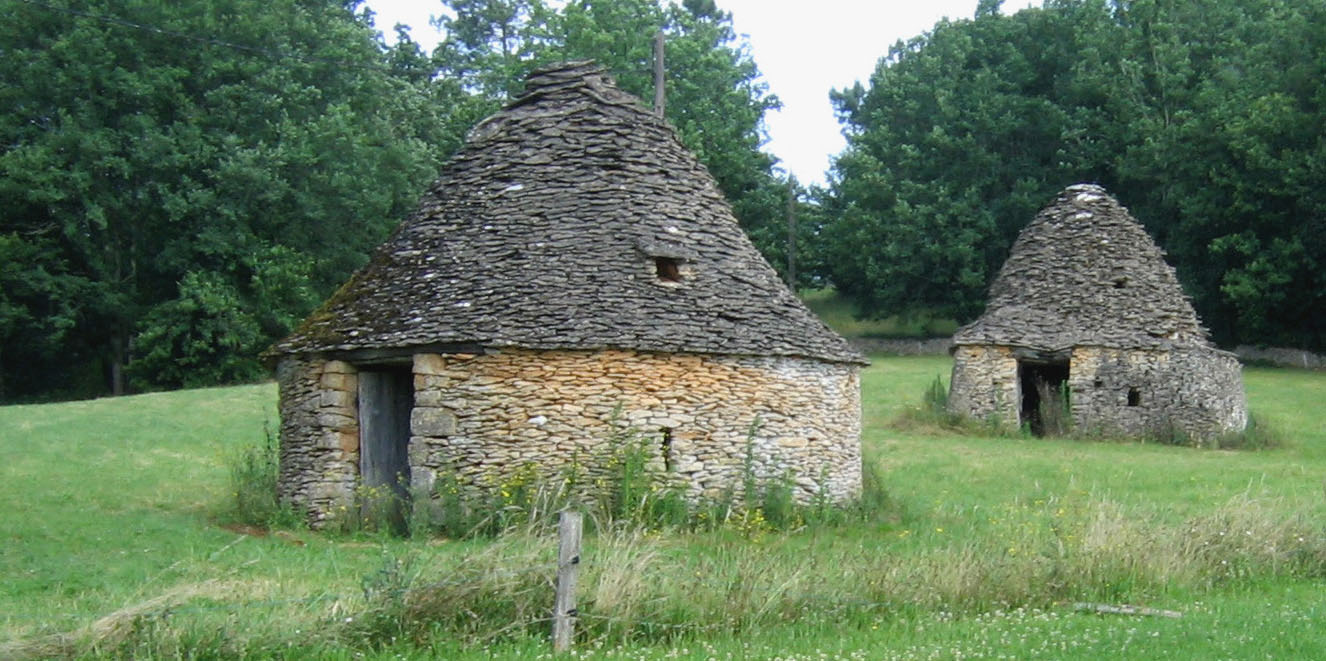
Cabanes (huts made with stones without mortar) in Meyrals

== Personalities ==
- Christophe de Beaumont, (1703–1781), archbishop of Paris, was born in Meyrals.

== Events ==
- Festival des épouvantails (Scarecrows) has been held every summer from 1999 to the present.
- The village of Meyrals was the setting for the film "Périgord noir" (1988), with Roland Giraud.

== International relations ==
Meyral has one sister city:

- - Bieuzy, France

== See also ==
- Communes of the Dordogne department

== Bibliography ==
- Jacqueline Jouanel, Histoire de Meyrals, des origines à la Révolution, édition Récéad, 2007
