= Médoc AOC =

Protected designation of origin

- Wine region
- Type: Appellation d'origine contrôlée
- Year established: 1936
- Country: France
- Part of: Bordeaux Left Bank
- Sub-regions: Haut-Médoc AOC, Margaux AOC, Listrac-Médoc AOC, Moulis-en-Médoc AOC, Saint-Julien AOC, Pauillac AOC, Saint-Estèphe AOC
- Climate region: Oceanic climate
- Soil conditions: chalk, clay, sand, gravel
- Total area: 5,742 ha (14,190 acres)
- No. of vineyards: 584
- Varietals produced: Cabernet Sauvignon, Merlot, Petit Verdot, Malbec, Cabernet Franc, Carménère
- Wine produced: 38,000,000 bottles 300,000 hl (7,900,000 US gal)

Médoc (French pronunciation: [medɔk]) is an AOC for wine in the Bordeaux wine region of southwestern France, on the Left Bank of the Gironde estuary that covers the northern section of the viticultural strip along the Médoc peninsula. The zone is sometimes called Bas-Médoc (English: Low-Médoc), though this term is not permitted on any label. With few exceptions there is produced only red wine, and no white wine has the right to be called Médoc.

The term Médoc is often used in a geographical sense to refer to the whole Left Bank region, and as defined by the original Institut National des Appellations d'Origine (INAO) decree of November 14, 1936, the appellation may be applied to all wine produced in the prescribed zone in the peninsula, but this is rare practice by estates within Médoc's sub-appellations as it carries lesser perceived prestige. Effectively it covers the northern third of the Médoc peninsula, defined by a border that runs from Saint-Yzans and Saint-Germain-d'Esteuil (at the northern edges of Haut-Médoc AOC and Saint-Estèphe AOC) in the south, to Soulac-sur-Mer in the north, although viticultural activity ends near Vensac.

Predominantly an area of cooperatives today, none of the estates were included in the Bordeaux Wine Official Classification of 1855, although several have been included in the (eventually discontinued) classification Cru Bourgeois.

== Overview ==
The area covers approximately 5,700 hectares of declared vineyards, constituting 34.5% of the Médoc total, annually producing on average 300,000 hectolitres of wine.

The soils are Garonne gravel, Pyrenees gravel and clayey limestone with extreme variation in character. There are frequent areas of heavy, clay-rich, moisture-retentive soils better suited for cultivation of the Merlot grape than Cabernet Sauvignon, and vineyards are less densely packed than further south, intermingled with other forms of agriculture.

Of the grape varieties permitted by INAO in Médoc, 50% of the viticultural area is planted with Cabernet Sauvignon and Merlot, and to a lesser extent Petit Verdot and Malbec (locally called "Côt"). Also allowed within the AOC regulations are the varieties Cabernet Franc and Carménère.

The INAO specifications demand the following production norms: a minimum of sugar, 170 g (6.0 oz) per litre of must, maximum base yield of 50 hecolitres per hectare, and a minimum alcohol by volume of 10%.

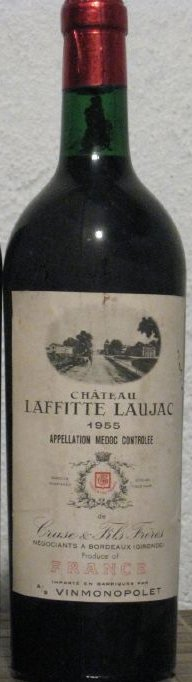
A bottle from an estate within the Médoc AOC, in this case Château Laffitte Laujac.

The regulations also exclude viticultural activity in the communes Carcans, Hourtin, Brach, Saumos, Lacanau, Le Temple, Le Porge, and on "land of recent alluvium and sand lying on impermeable subsoils".

=== Estates ===
Of the 584 viticultural properties of Haut-Médoc, 239 are independent wineries and 345 are in winemaking cooperatives. Four out of five cooperatives belong to the group Unimédoc which ensures aging, bottling and marketing.

Cru Bourgeois^{[a]}
Château de By	Château du Perier	Château La Cardonne
Château Castéra	Château La Clare	Château Greysac
Château Laujac	Château Livran	Château Loudenne
Château de Monthil	Château les Ormes-Sorbet	Château Patache-d'Aux
Château Potensac	Château Plagnac	Château Preuillac
Château Saint-Bonnet	Château Saint-Christophe	Château Saint-Saturnin
Château Sestignan	Château Sigognac	Château Le Tertre-Caussan
Château La Tour de By	Château La Tour Haut-Caussan	Château La Tour-Saint-Bonnet
Château La Valière	Vieux Château Landon	La Gloire du Paysan

== Notes and references ==
a. Cru Bourgeois as a term of classification since 1932, was annulled in 2007, and reintroduced in 2009.

General

- Médoc Bordeaux.com, Le Conseil Interprofessionnel du Vin de Bordeaux (CIVB)
- Médoc AOC decree, INAO (in French)

Footnotes
