= Château Sigognac =

- Location: Saint-Yzans-de-Médoc, Gironde, Nouvelle-Aquitaine, France
- Coordinates: 44.332328°N 0.831835°W
- Wine region: Médoc
- Appellation: Médoc
- Other labels: Benjamin de Sigognac
- Founded: 16th century
- Key people: Cristophe Allard (Owner) Stéphanie Lebaron (General Manager); Cédric Gabor (Cellar Master) Christine Le Port (Sales Manager)
- Parent company: Vineyards Allard SAS
- Area cultivated: 45 hectares
- Cases/yr: 19,500
- Known for: Château Sigognac
- Varietals: Benjamin de Sigognac, Le Blanc de l'Estuaire, Le Rose de l'Estuaire
- Tasting: Open to public, Mon-Fri, 9am - 6pm, all year
- Website: Château Sigognac website

Château Sigognac is a Bordeaux wine producer located in the commune of Saint-Yzans-de-Médoc, in the department of Gironde in the Nouvelle-Aquitaine region of south-western France. It is located within the Médoc Appellation d'origine contrôlée (AOC) some 1.5 km north-west of the village and 3 km south-east of Couqueques just off the D2 road near the intersection with the D102 road

== History ==
The Château Sigognac is located on the plain of Saint-Yzans. It was built on the ruins of a Roman ’Villa Ausone’ whose thermal baths at the time called Ciconius were located in the nearby Bois Carré. 16th century texts refer to the noble house of Segougnac which belonged to the Count of Lesparre.

From the 18th century, Chateau Sigognac wine was exported to numerous countries. In the museum of the French East India Company at Lorient there is the model of a ship dating from 1740 on which there are barrels bearing the name "Sigognac".

More recently, the Chateau’s deeds tell us that a Mr Martin Subercaseaux acquired the Domain of Sigognac (100 hectares) on 8 September 1828. After several generations the Chateau Sigognac passed into the hands of Mr & Mrs Caussade on 21 January 1898. The Caussade family held onto the property for some time, reducing its size during the 1950s at which point the last survivor of the family, Mr Emmanuel Caussade, a Bordeaux wine merchant, sold his interest in the property to Mr Sarrazin. After the notorious frosts of 1956, Mr Sarrazin tore out and replaced nearly all of the vines.

On 20 February 1964 Mr Paul-François Grasset acquired this 58 hectares property with its remaining 4 hectares of vines.

The vineyard was re-established by Mr Grasset between 1965 and 1968, the year of his death. His widow, Colette Grasset, continued to extend the vineyard by first buying in 1971 15 hectares which had been part of Sigognac in the 19th century then continued to plant the vineyard after her marriage to Jacques Bonny who actively contributed to the improvement and revival of Chateau Sigognac.

In March 2009 Mr & Mrs Bonny sold the Chateau to Vineyards Allard SAS, chaired by Mr Christophe Allard, the former proprietor of Château de Gironville at Macau.

Château Sigognac was first listed as a Cru Bourgeois du Medoc since 1932 and was classed as a Grand Bourgeois in 1978. In July 2007 the use of the term Cru Bourgeois became illegal and a new certification was introduced in 2010 and applied to the 2008 vintage. Château Sigognac was listed as a Cru Bourgeois in the official list for 2010 and 2011 vintages (but not 2009).

== The Vineyard ==
Situated just outside Saint-Yzans-de-Medoc and with the estuary immediately to its east, the 47 hectare vineyard of Chateau Sigognac is planted in clayey-chalky and clayey-sandy soils which are characteristic of Médoc.

Since the Chateau’s change of ownership in March 2009, the vineyard has been subject to a significant amount of reorganisation and improvement. This has included replacement planting, improvements to the soil and the renewal of older sections of the vineyard. In each case the overriding objective has been the same – to improve consistency and quality.

The average age of the vines is from 35 to 40 years. The planting is traditional with a density of 5,500 vines per hectare. Caring for the vines is an ongoing process and all the stages of the growing cycle are treated with equal care: pruning, leaf thinning, green harvest, removal of new shoots, and finally the harvest.

== The Wines ==
"Sigognac is and will remain a resolutely Medoc wine, a true wine of passion, fruity, complex and pleasant to drink and definitely not a fashion wine which is devoid of heart and character!"

— Cristophe Allard,

=== Château Sigognac ===
- Cru Bourgeois Medoc
- 180,000 bottles
- 55% Cabernet, 45% Merlot, 5% Petit Verdot

A wine to lay down ideally for drinking in 5 to 10 years. A typical Medoc wine, elegant, structured and fruity, with a purplish appearance and aromas of red fruit.

=== Benjamin de Sigognac ===
- 50,000 bottles
- Primarily Merlot

A fruity character, shared characteristics with Medoc wine.

=== Le Blanc de l'Estuaire ===
- 2,000 bottles
- Primarily Sémillon

Notes of citrus, fruits and white flowers. A garden wine, ideal as an aperitif, light and fruity.

=== Le Rosé de l'Estuaire ===
- 2,000 bottles

A saignée Rosé mostly of merlot. With notes of fresh red fruits like strawberries with a clear rose colour. Ideal for summer, as an apéritif, or to accompany the grill.

== The wine-making process ==
Chateau Sigognac respects the techniques and traditions of the Medoc. The harvest is timed to coincide with the optimum phenological ripeness of the grapes. After the grapes are sorted and completely de-stemmed, fermentation takes place in stainless steel and cement/epoxy tanks for approximately 10 days.

A long fermentation of the skins with post-fermentation maceration which varies according to the following criteria:

- The type of wine that is desired
- The grape variety
- The level of maturity
- The state of sanitation

Once the process of Malolactic fermentation in tanks is completed the wine making process is complete and the wine is then pre-assembled and aged from the beginning of January.

The 1st wine is traditionally stored in barrels of French oak for anything between 12 and 15 months.

At the end of this period the final assembly takes place under the watchful eyes of the oenologists and technicians. Once this has been completed, the wine is stored in vats ready for bottling.

Chateau Sigognac is bottled on site.

== Literature ==
In literature the Château de Sigognac is the home of the person of the same name in the novel by Théophile Gautier called Le Capitaine Fracasse.

== See also ==
- Chateau Sigognac website (in French and English)
