= Yolanda Edwards =

American writer, editor, and media executive

- Education: University of California, Berkeley
- Occupations: Travel writer, editor, content producer
- Years active: 1997–present
- Notable work: Condé Nast Traveler
- Website: yolojournal.com

Yolanda Edwards is an American writer, editor, and media executive. She is the former creative director of Conde Nast Traveler magazine, and is the founder and publisher of Yolo Journal. Edwards was also the former executive editor at Martha Stewart Living, Travel and lifestyle editor at Cookie magazine, and a photo editor at W magazine. Since leaving Condé Nast, her byline has also appeared in Domino magazine.

== Education ==
After graduating high school, Edwards participated in a cultural immersion program on the Greek island of Kalymnos, which was the first time she was able to travel internationally.

Edwards is a graduate of University of California, Berkeley, where she studied comparative literature.

== Career ==
Following her graduation from Berkeley in 1992, Edwards bounced between jobs before moving into photography. She began her career in journalism at Condé Nast Traveler as a junior photo editor.

Edwards then worked as a photo editor at W magazine, travel and lifestyle editor at Cookie magazine, the executive editor at Martha Stewart Living, before moving back to Condé Nast Traveler in 2013 as the creative director. She served as the creative director for five years before her position was eliminated by Condé Nast.

After getting laid off from Condé Nast in 2018, Edwards began work on what became Yolo Journal, a quarterly print journal about travel. She also helps publish her husband's magazine, Wm Brown, where she is the creative director.

== Personal life ==
Edwards is married to Matt Hranek, with whom she has a daughter named Clara. Edwards and her husband own a home in upstate New York as well as in Saint Yzans in the Medoc Region of France.
