= Hourtin =

- Commune
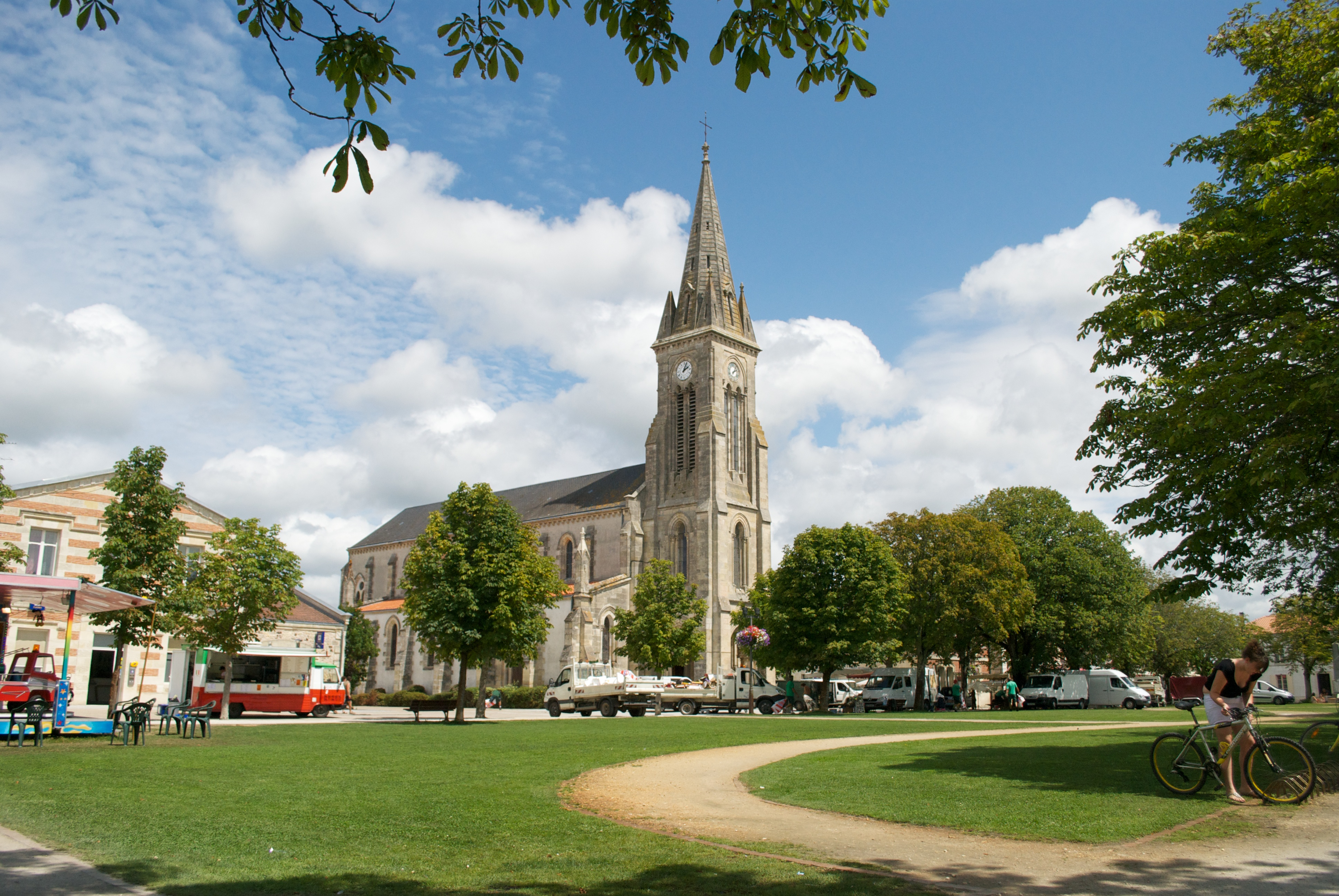
- Church square in Hourtin-Ville

- Coat of arms
- Location of Hourtin
- Location within France Location within Nouvelle-Aquitaine
- Coordinates: 45°11′14″N 1°03′23″W
- Country: France
- Region: Nouvelle-Aquitaine
- Department: Gironde
- Arrondissement: Lesparre-Médoc
- Canton: Le Sud-Médoc
- Intercommunality: CC Médoc Atlantique

Government
  - Mayor (2020–2026): Jean-Marc Signoret
- Area^{1}: 190.50 km^{2} (73.55 sq mi)
- Elevation: 18 m (59 ft)
- Highest elevation: 64 m (210 ft)
- Lowest elevation: 0 m (0 ft)
- Population (2023): 4,045
  - Density: 21.23/km^{2} (54.99/sq mi)
- Time zone: UTC+01:00 (CET)
  - Summer (DST): UTC+02:00 (CEST)
- INSEE/Postal code: 33203 /33990
- ^{1} French Land Register data, which excludes lakes, ponds, glaciers > 1 km^{2} (0.386 sq mi or 247 acres) and river estuaries.

Hourtin (French pronunciation: [uʁtɛ̃]; Occitan: Hortin, pronounced [uɾˈti(n)]) is a commune of southwestern France, located in the Gironde department, administrative region of Nouvelle-Aquitaine (before 2015: Aquitaine). It is located in the canton Le Sud-Médoc, part of the district of Lesparre-Médoc. It is a member of the Community of Communes of Médoc Atlantique.

With 4,045 inhabitants in 2023, this town in the Médoc region is divided into six main districts: Hourtin-Ville, Hourtin-Port, Hourtin-Plage, Lachanau, Contaut, and Piqueyrot. Nestled in the heart of the Landes forest, it borders the Côte d'Argent and encompasses half the surface area of France's largest natural freshwater lake, Lac d'Hourtin-Carcans. Hourtin is also the thirtieth largest town in France by area. Part of the town's territory is classified as a national nature reserve.

An economic hub focused on the tertiary sector (commerce and crafts, in particular), Hourtin is also one of the Médoc's main seaside resorts, boasting beaches on both the lake and the Atlantic Ocean.

Hourtin is part of the Pays de Médoc and the Médoc Atlantique inter-municipal authority, with about 28,000 inhabitants.

== Population ==
Historical population
Year	Pop.	±% p.a.
1968	2,063	—
1975	2,290	+1.50%
1982	2,048	−1.58%
1990	2,072	+0.15%
1999	2,324	+1.28%
2007	2,528	+1.06%
2012	3,318	+5.59%
2017	3,506	+1.11%
2023	4,045	+2.41%
Source: INSEE

== Geography ==
=== Location ===
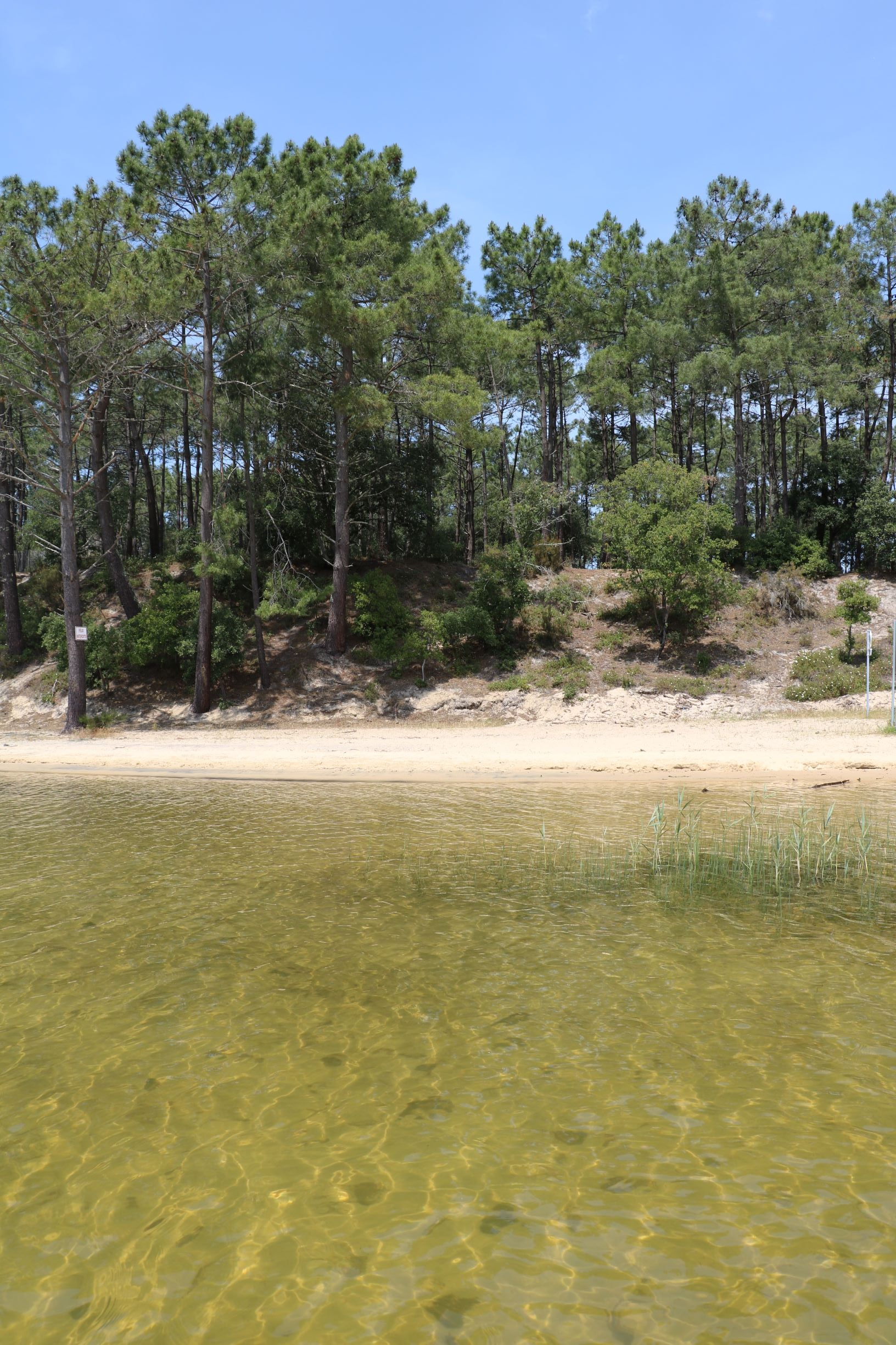
West bank of Hourtin's lake in Piqueyrot.

The town of Hourtin is located in the northwest of the Gironde department, in the heart of the Médoc peninsula and more specifically in the Landes du Médoc region. Bordering the Atlantic Ocean, it lies within the Côte d'Argent. It is divided into three main districts (Hourtin-Ville, Hourtin-Port, and Hourtin-Plage) and several hamlets (Contaut, Piqueyrot, and Lachanau), spread several kilometers apart. The town's administrative center, Hourtin-Ville, is 12 km from Hourtin-Plage, a seaside resort and the main tourist hub during the summer months.

Hourtin shares the Lac d'Hourtin-Carcans neighbor, Carcans. This lake is one of the "Great Landes Lakes" that border the Gironde and Landes coastline. It covers 5,800 hectares.

The town is also located within the Landes forest in Gascony, a vast pine forest forming a triangle stretching from Pointe de Grave in the north to Hossegor in the south and Nérac in the east. Covering nearly one million hectares, it is the largest forest in France and the largest artificial forest in Western Europe, managed intensively and primarily as a monoculture of maritime pine. Mainly privately owned, it includes a state-owned section located near the Atlantic coastline. It encompasses most of a national nature reserve, the Hourtin Dunes and Marshes National Nature Reserve, managed by the Landes-Nord-Aquitaine branch of the French National Forestry Office (ONF).

Hourtin belongs to the arrondissement of Lesparre-Médoc and the canton of Le Sud-Médoc, centered on Lacanau. The town is located 8.1 kilometers from Naujac-sur-Mer, 11.8 kilometers from Carcans, 16.6 kilometers from Lesparre-Médoc, 19 kilometers from Saint-Laurent-Médoc, 23.1 kilometers from Lacanau, 24.4 kilometers from Pauillac, 27.4 kilometers from Saint-Vivien-de-Médoc, 36.9 kilometers from Soulac-sur-Mer, 49.1 kilometers from Royan (by ferry), 53.7 kilometers from Bordeaux, the departmental prefecture and regional capital, and 59.2 kilometers from Arcachon.

Road infrastructure puts Hourtin-Ville 20 minutes from Lesparre-Médoc, the sub-prefecture and main town in the area, 30 minutes from Pauillac, 1 hour 20 minutes from Royan, 1 hour 30 minutes from Bordeaux, and 1 hour 45 minutes from Arcachon.

=== Neighboring communes ===
The neighbouring communes are Carcans, Lesparre-Médoc, Naujac-sur-Mer, Saint-Germain-d'Esteuil and Saint-Laurent-Médoc.

== Urban planning ==
=== Typology ===
As of 1 January 2024, Hourtin is categorized as a rural town, according to the new seven-level municipal density scale defined by INSEE (the French National Institute of Statistics and Economic Studies) in 2022. It belongs to the Hourtin urban area, a single-commune urban unit constituting an isolated town. Furthermore, the commune is part of the Bordeaux metropolitan area, of which it is a peripheral commune. This area, which includes 275 communes, is categorized as having a population of 700,000 or more (excluding Paris).

The commune, bordered by an inland body of water with a surface area exceeding 1,000 hectares, Lac d'Hourtin-Carcans, is also a coastal commune as defined by the French law of 3 January 1986, known as the Coastal Law. Specific urban planning provisions therefore apply in order to preserve natural spaces, sites, landscapes and the ecological balance of the coastline, such as the principle of non-building, outside urbanized areas, on the coastal strip of 100 meters, or more if the local urban plan provides for it.

=== Land use ===
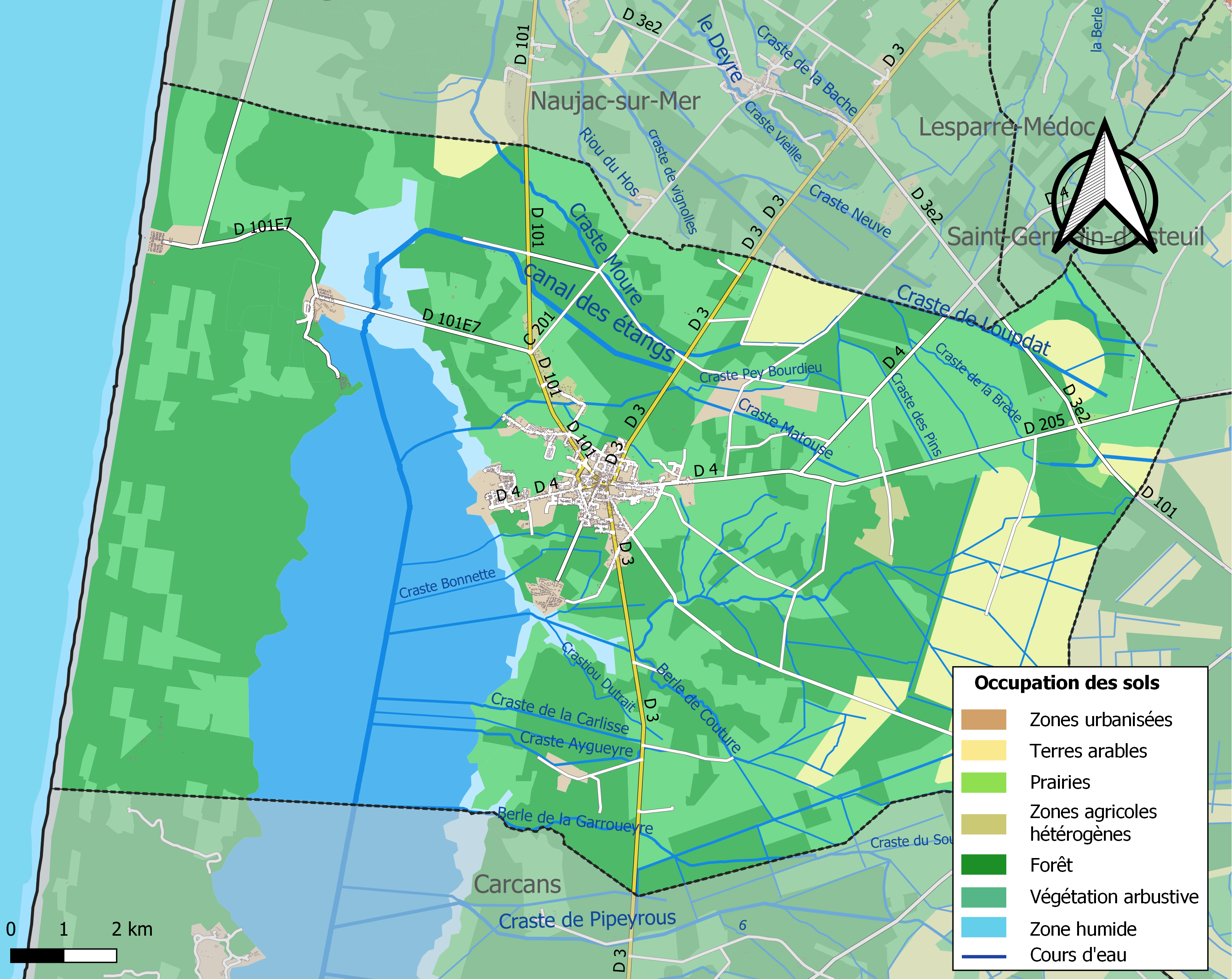
Map of infrastructure and land use in Hourtin

Land cover in the commune, as shown in the European biophysical land cover database Corine Land Cover (CLC), is characterized by the significant presence of forests and semi-natural areas (70.3% in 2018), a decrease compared to 1990 (71.4%). The detailed breakdown in 2018 is as follows: forests (40.2%), areas with shrub and/or herbaceous vegetation (28.9%), inland waters (14.5%), arable land (8.6%), inland wetlands (2.7%), urbanized areas (2.1%), open spaces with little or no vegetation (1.1%), heterogeneous agricultural areas (0.6%), mines, landfills and construction sites (0.5%), artificial, non-agricultural green spaces (0.3%), meadows (0.2%), coastal wetlands (0.2%). The evolution of land use in the commune and its infrastructure can be observed on the different cartographic representations of the territory: the Cassini map (18th century), the general staff map (1820-1866) and the maps or aerial photos of the IGN for the current period (1950 to today).

=== Major risks ===
The territory of the commune of Hourtin is vulnerable to various natural hazards: weather-related events (storms, thunderstorms, snow, extreme cold, heat waves, or droughts), floods, forest fires, landslides, and earthquakes (very low seismicity). It is also exposed to a technological risk, namely nuclear risk.

==== Natural risks ====
Certain parts of the commune are susceptible to flooding from coastal flooding. The commune has been declared a natural disaster area due to damage caused by floods and mudslides in 1982, 1983, 1999, and 2009.

Hourtin is exposed to the risk of forest fires. Since 20 April 2016, the departments of Gironde, Landes, and Lot-et-Garonne have had an interdepartmental regulation for forest fire protection. This regulation aims to improve forest fire prevention, facilitate emergency services interventions, and limit the consequences, whether through brush clearing, limiting the spread of fire, or regulating activities in the forest. It defines, in particular, five increasing levels of vigilance, each associated with different measures. Regarding land-use planning, the municipality has a forest fire risk prevention plan (PPRIF).

The land movements likely to occur in the commune are dune advances. Dune migration is the movement of dunes inland. The combined actions of the sea and wind displace the sands and thus modify the morphology of the coastline.

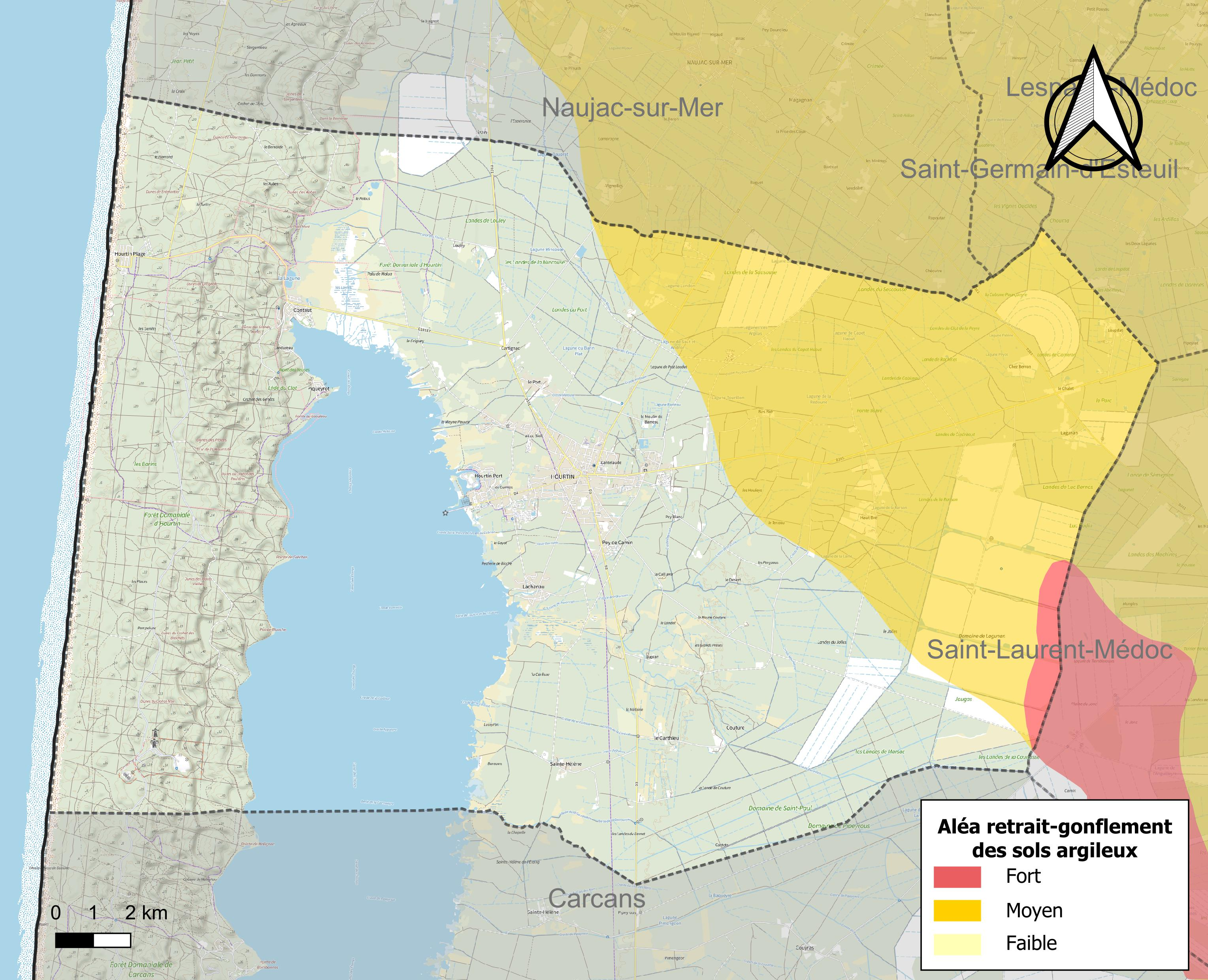
Map of the shrink-swell hazard zones of clay soils in Hourtin.

The shrinkage and swelling of clay soils can cause significant damage to buildings in the event of alternating periods of drought and rain. 23.8% of the commune's area is at medium or high risk (67.4% at the departmental level and 48.5% at the national level). Of the 3,009 buildings counted in the commune in 2019, 49 are at medium or high risk, representing 2%, compared to 84% at the departmental level and 54% at the national level.

Furthermore, to better understand the risk of ground subsidence, the national inventory of underground cavities allows for the identification of those located within the commune.

Regarding landslides, the commune was recognized as being in a state of natural disaster due to damage caused by drought in 2003 and by landslides in 1999.

==== Technological risks ====
Because the commune is partially located within the 20 km radius of the Specific Intervention Plan (PPI) around the Blayais Nuclear Power Plant, it is exposed to nuclear risk. In the event of a nuclear accident, an alert is issued via various media (siren, text message, radio, vehicles). Upon receiving the alert, residents within a 2 km radius should take shelter. Residents within a 20 km radius may be ordered by the prefect to evacuate and take stable iodine tablets.

== Name ==
In Gascon, the name of the town is spelled Hortin.

Since Hourtin is in the Médoc region, Gascon territory, most of the old place names can be explained by Gascon, for example, La Palénouse, La Craste du Poutéou (du Poteau), Le Loc das Jacquets, Le Hourtinat, La Houdine, Le Hagnous, Les Vignes Oudides (Houdides), Reychinet (Hreishinet), Haouguéras, Jaugas, Le Caillava, Le Camba, Le Matoca, Lous Barennats, Lous Cambas, Griguey, La Garroueyre, Le Bourdiley, L’Oumbreyre, La Cabane Pourqueyre, Le Guiney, Les Ardileys, Lous Périlleys, Piqueyrot...

== History ==
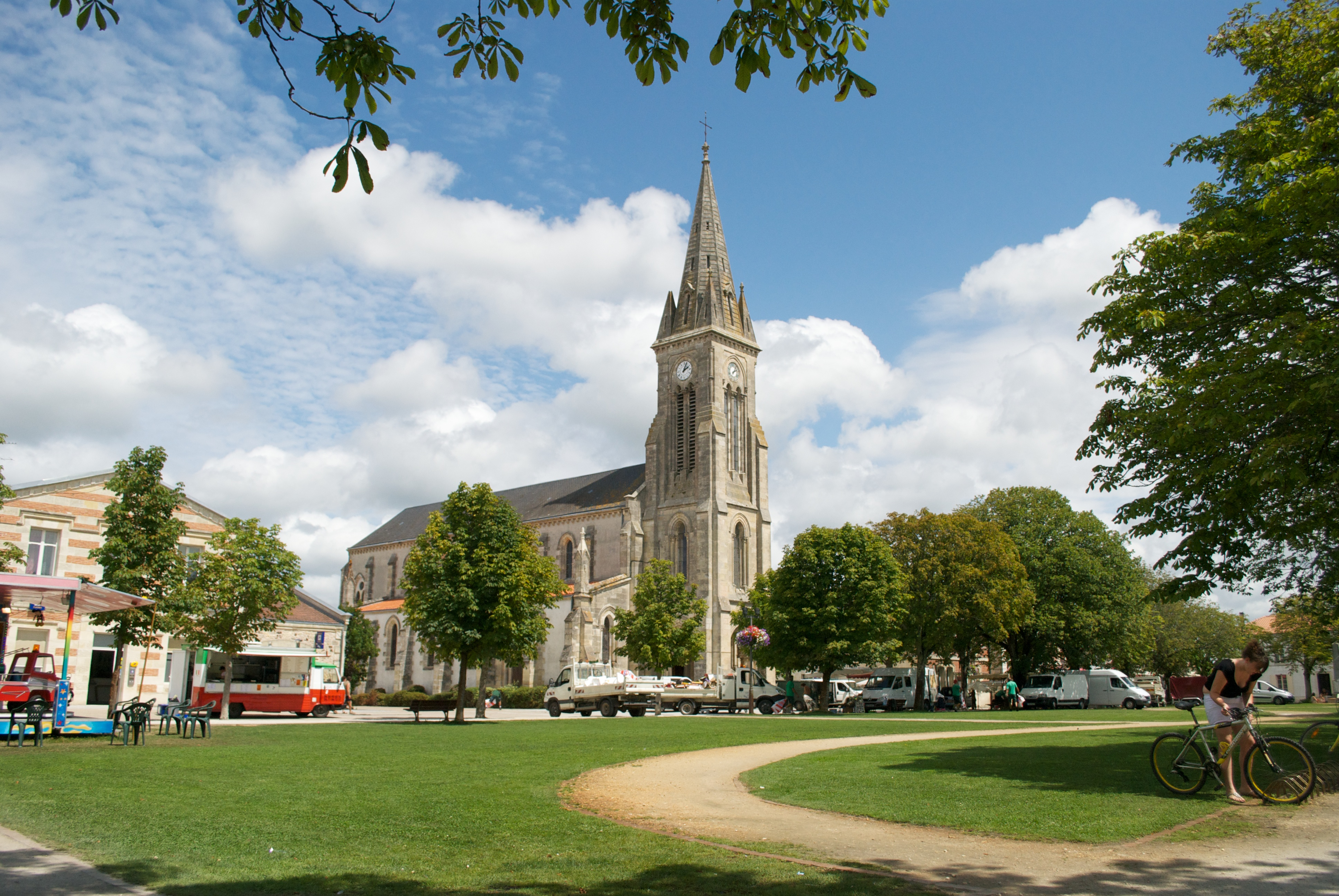
Church Square in Hourtin-Ville.

The present-day town was known as Cartignac until 1628, Hourtin then being just a small hamlet within the village.

During the French Revolution, the current town of Hourtin replaced the former parish of Saint-Hélène d'Estang or Saint-Hélène de l'Étang.

The town's territory is centered on the Berle de Lupian river. In the Middle Ages, this stream flowed into a bay open to the ocean. At its mouth were a port and a town called Luzerne or Louvergne. The steady advance of the sands caused the bay to close in, forming a lake, which was also pushed eastward. Local lore recounts that the town was swallowed up by the receding lake. The population retreated to the shores of the "Médoc lake" or "Lake Cartignac," where 17th-century cartographers mention the Estang or Sainte-Hélène to the north of Cartignac. The lake then extended as far as Pélous, where a port opened onto the bay in the 13th century.

18th-century maps differ; from south to north, they show: another Sainte-Hélène, Berre (present-day Lachanau, at the mouth of the Berle River), Hourtin, and Cartignac. Sainte-Hélène, which was located south of the town, was in turn destroyed by the waters (in 1628?) and was replaced by the village of Hourtin, situated further north.

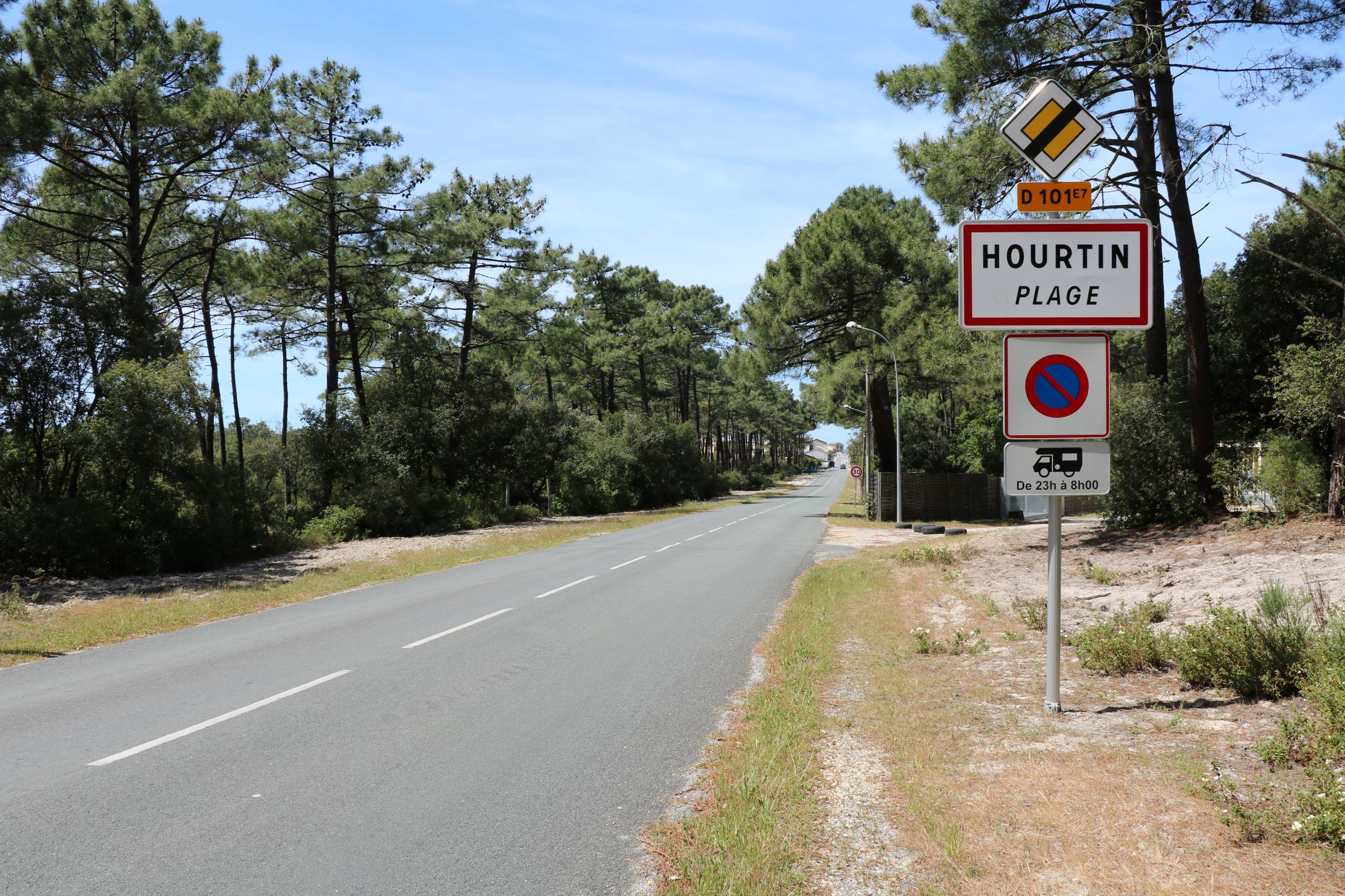
Entrance sign for Hourtin-Plage.

The extension of the Contaut road to the sea was approved by the town council in 1921. In 1922, the commune submitted its first request to the State for a concession in the state forest. The paving of the Contaut road to the sea was completed in 1925. In 1927, the commune requested a land exchange with the State for the creation of the Genêts concession. The name Hourtin-Plage was officially adopted in 1935. 192 plots of land were sold in 1937, and 18 houses were built in 1938. The Côte d'Argent campsite opened in 1965, contributing to the growth of seaside tourism.

The hamlet of Lachanau developed in a unique way; Indeed, following a decision by the city council in 1956, 12 families from Bordeaux were authorized to rent plots of land measuring 150 square meters and to erect temporary, demountable structures. The leases were renewable annually. It was only in 1989 that the city council decided to sell the plots back to the tenants.

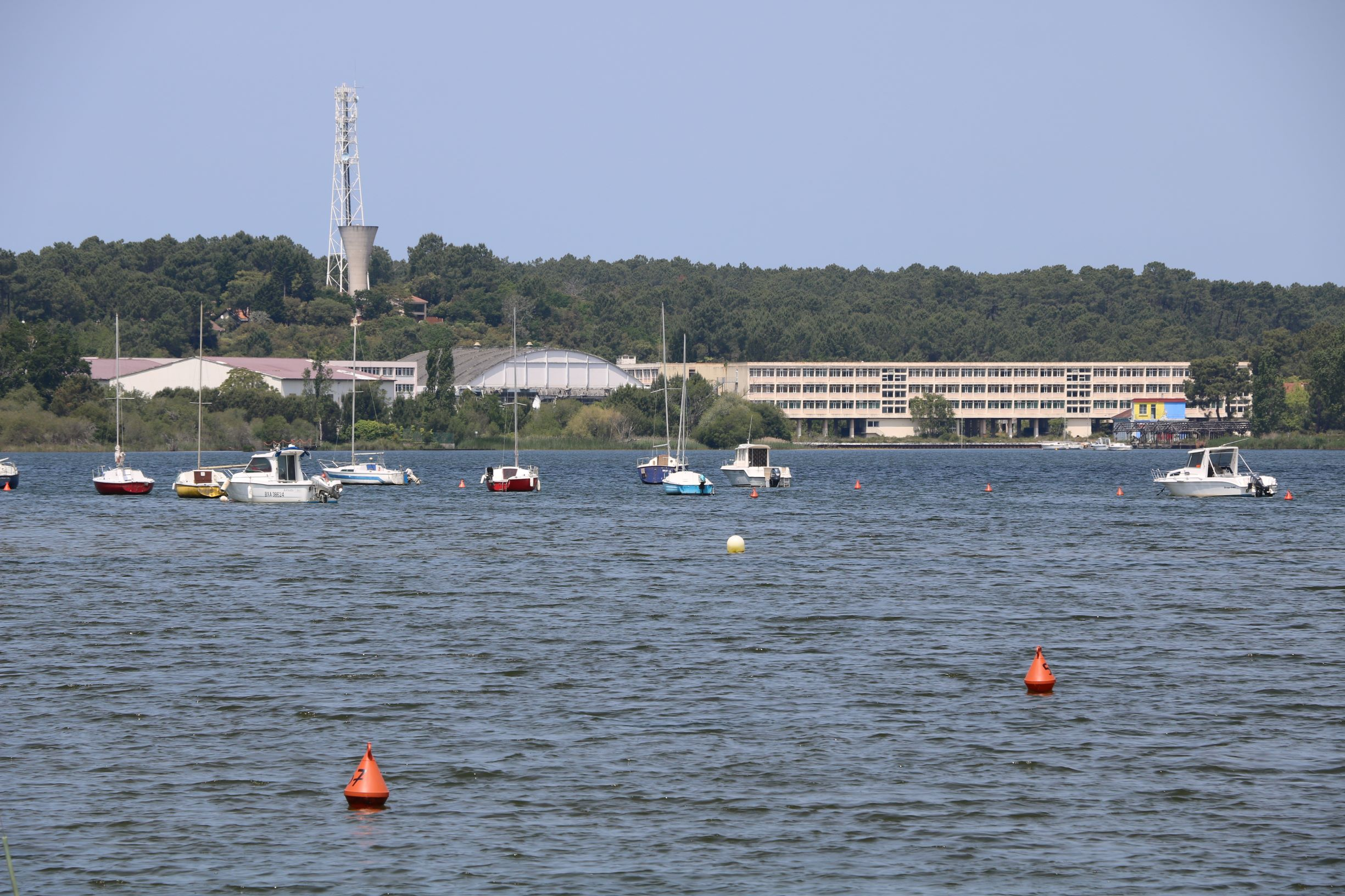
The former Hourtin Maritime Training Centre (CFM) in Contaut.

It was also on the land of the municipality of Hourtin, on the shores of the large lake at Contaut, that the Hourtin Maritime Training Center (CFM) was located. Built between 1925 and 1939 to house seaplanes and preserved after the war, the site became a training center for conscripts in the French Navy. It could accommodate 1,800 apprentice sailors per month and had 600 permanent staff on approximately 27 hectares and 70,000 square meters of buildings.

Following the suspension of conscription by Jacques Chirac, the military base closed its doors in June 2000.

In May 1999, a year before the gates of the CFM were padlocked, the French Rugby Federation abandoned its plans to establish itself there after having considered creating the "Clairefontaine" of rugby. At the end of 2009, while permits for the development of a hotel complex and a marina were being signed, two environmental protection associations filed an appeal and succeeded in having the port project cancelled. The tourism redevelopment project thus never came to fruition, and the CFM remains abandoned despite the site's purchase by a Belgian developer.

== Events ==
For 25 years, Hourtin hosted the "Summer University of Communication," attracting numerous prominent figures at the end of August. Industrialists, institutional representatives, as well as political leaders and journalists, gathered there. The last edition was held in 2004.

Since 1996, the Hourtin Médoc Music University, with its "International Music Academy," has welcomed many participants each year during the Easter school holidays, offering masterclasses, concerts, and exhibitions.

From 2013 to 2021, the town hosted the Leclerc Frenchman, a triathlon with XXL distances: a 3.8 km swim, a 180 km bike ride, and a 42.195 km run.

In addition to water sports, numerous events and activities are organized throughout the year, such as the Hourtin Surf System.

Also worth noting: the Armistice Grand Prix, organized by the Hourtin Médoc Sailing Club.

The Hourtin market is held every Thursday morning, year-round, in the church square. During the summer months (July–August), the market is also held on Tuesday and Saturday mornings, in addition to a night market featuring local crafts on Mondays in Hourtin-Plage and Fridays in Hourtin-Port.

== Local life and heritage ==
=== Sights ===
- The Church of Saint Helen in Hourtin.
- The wooden chapel of Contaut.
- The Hourtin Museum, "Looking Back to the Past," located in a former railway station used for transporting timber.
- The Hourtin lighthouse in the coastal dunes, listed as a historical monument since 2009.
- The Landes Forest, the largest man-made forest in Western Europe.
- The Hourtin and Carcans lakes, on the shores of which the Hourtin-Port tourist complex is built.
- Since 2008, a special protection area (Natura 2000), entirely marine, covers a territory with a high concentration of nutrients, attracting pelagic fish and seabirds, particularly in autumn and winter when many migratory or wintering species, such as the Balearic shearwater, gather there.
- Since 2009, part of the dunes and marshes of Hourtin and Naujac-sur-Mer has been classified as a national nature reserve.
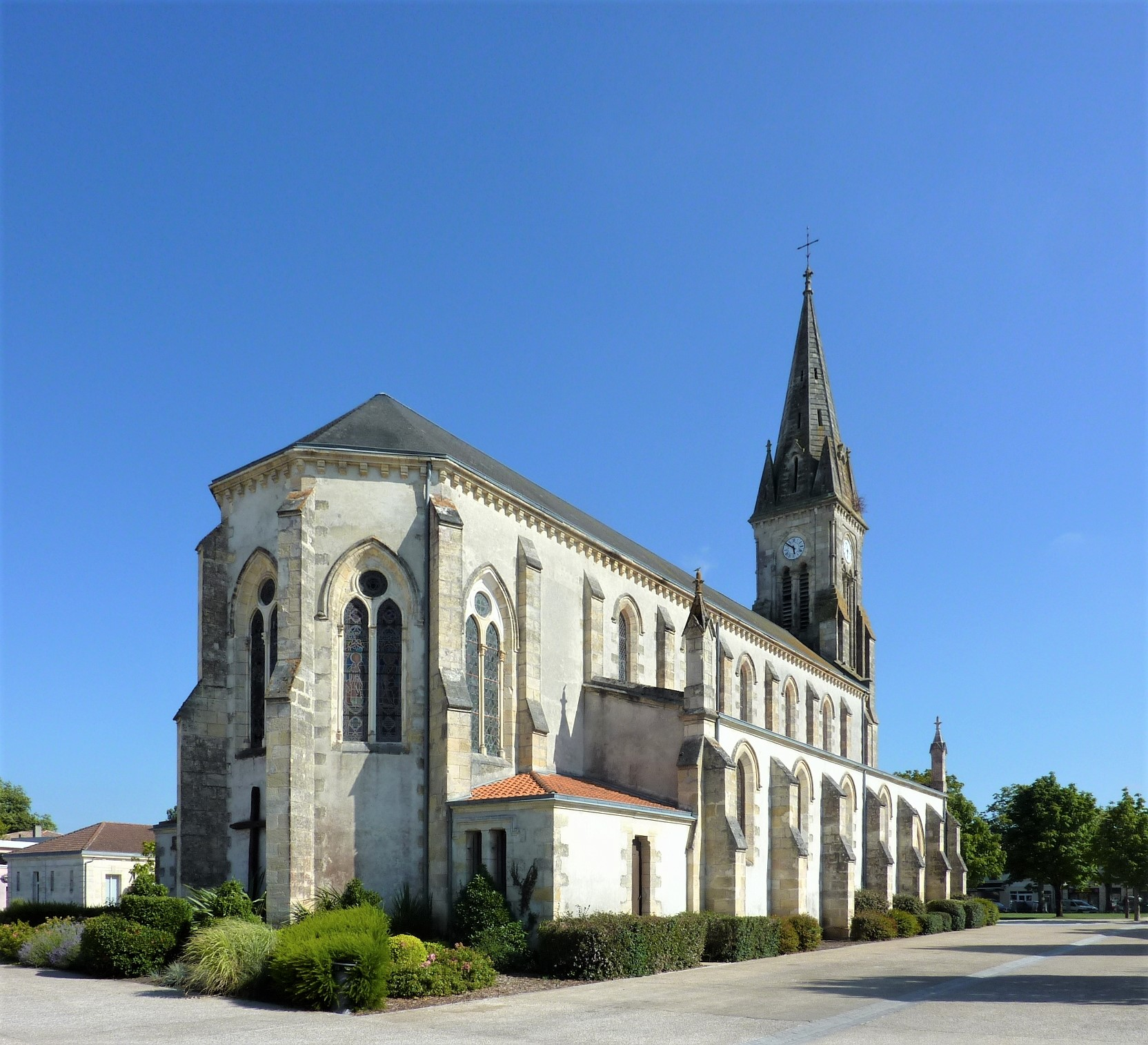
Saint Helen's Church

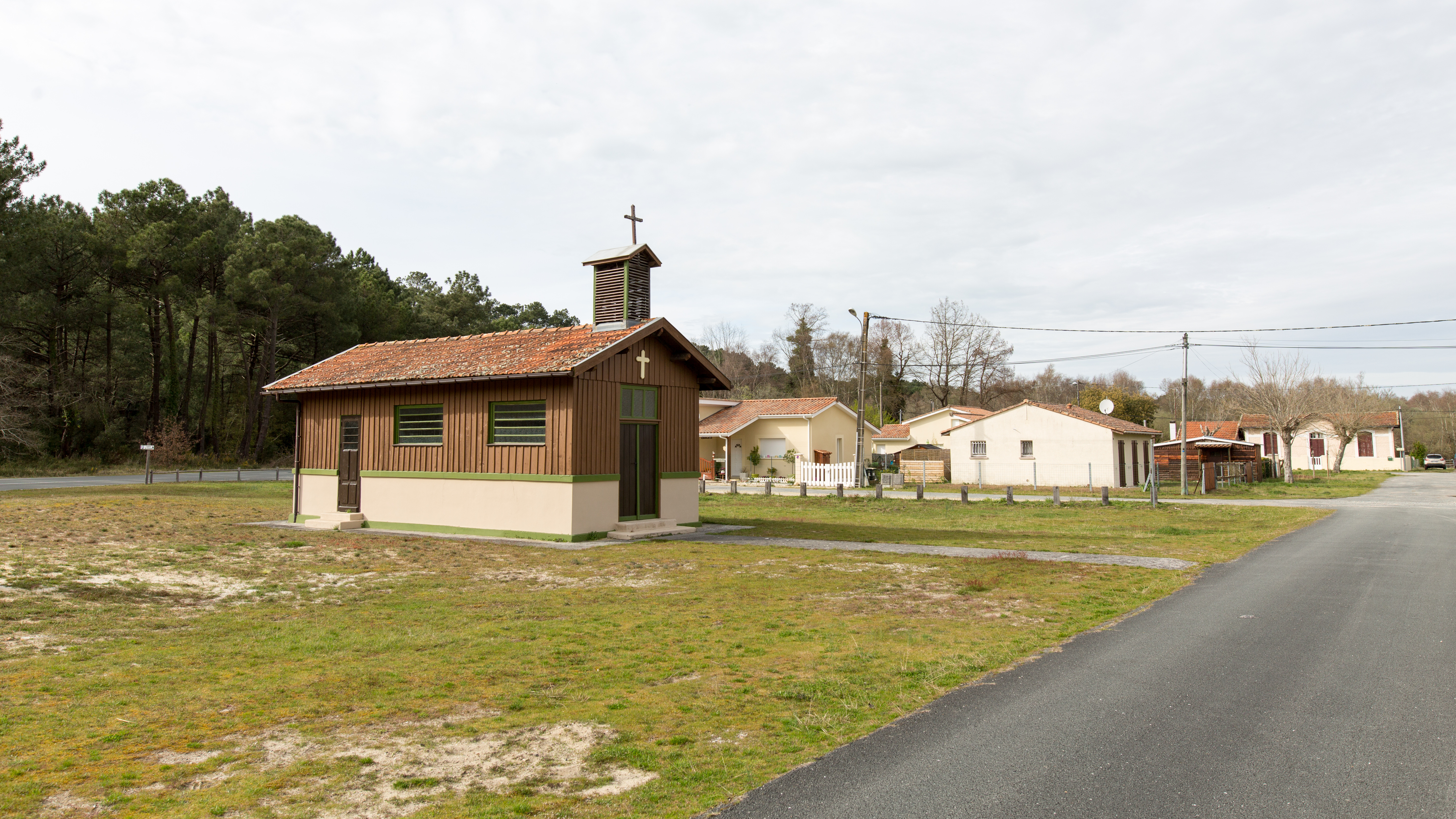
Contaut Chapel

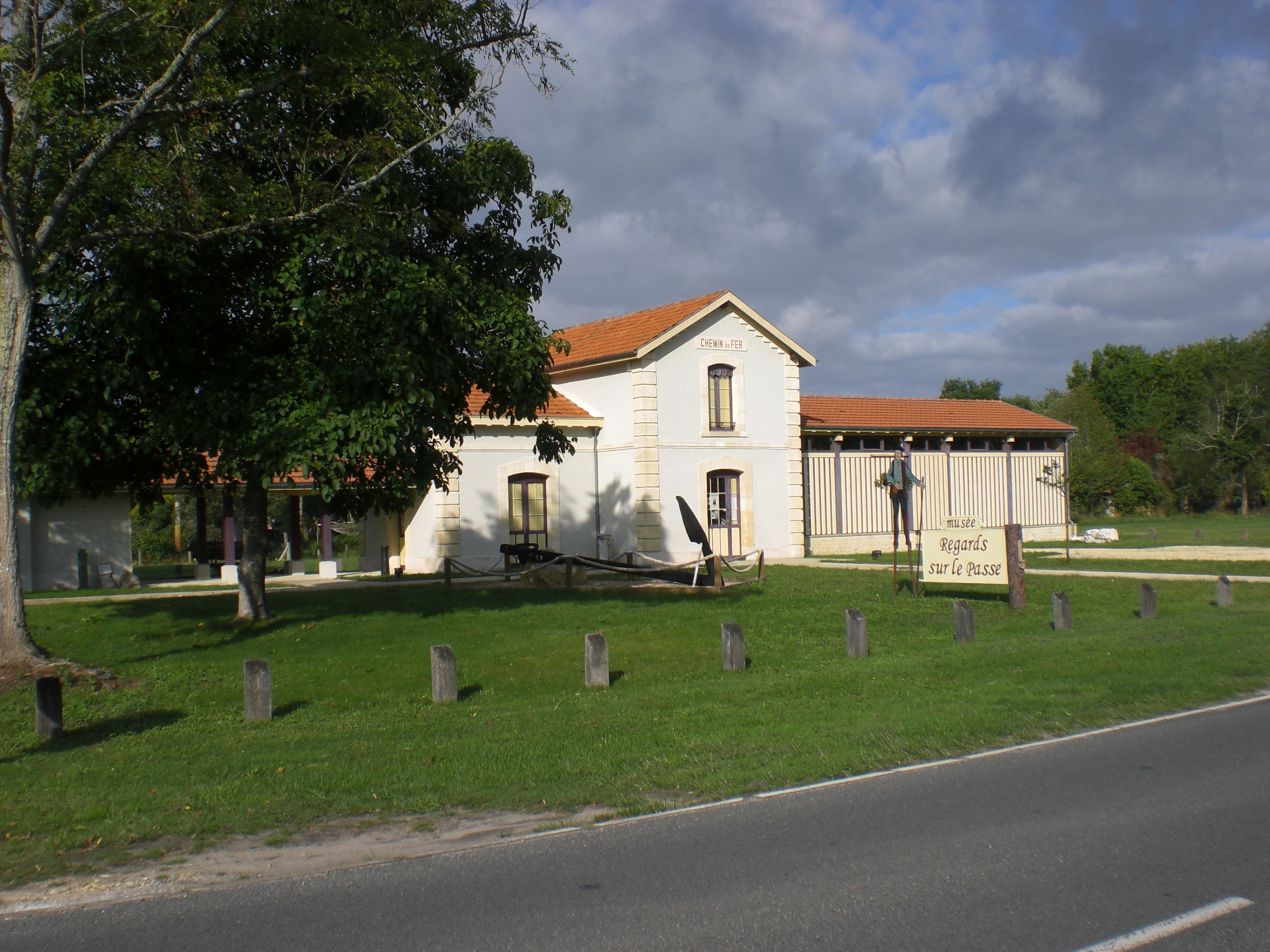
Museum “Looking at the Past”

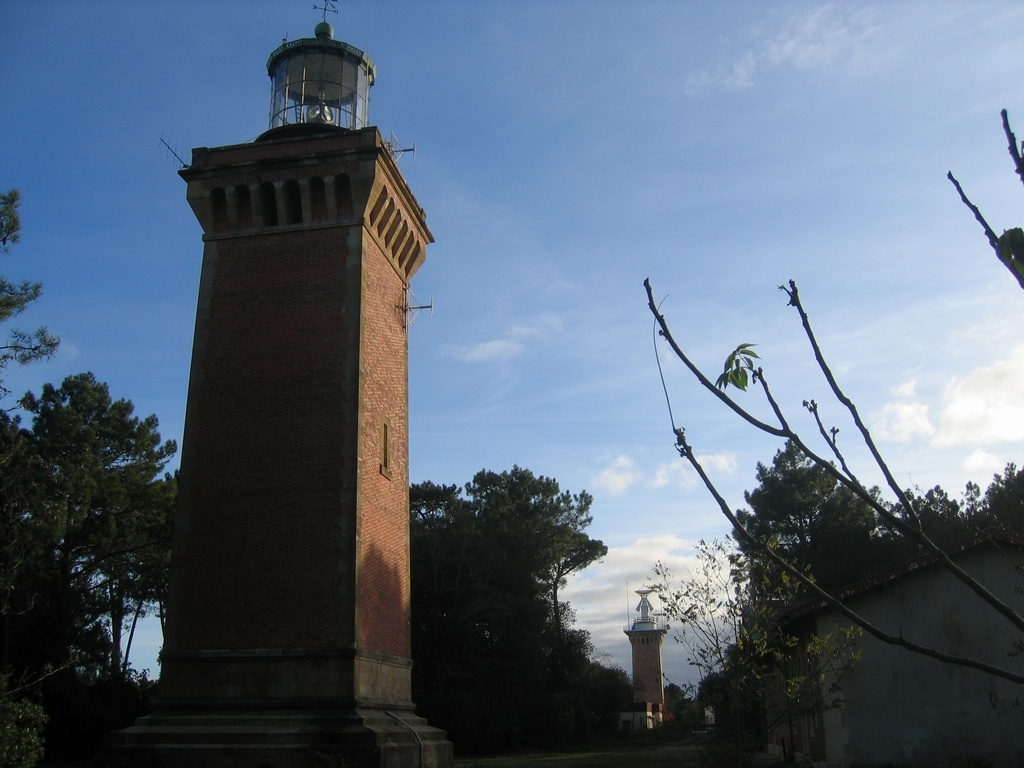
Hourtin lighthouse and south tower in the background

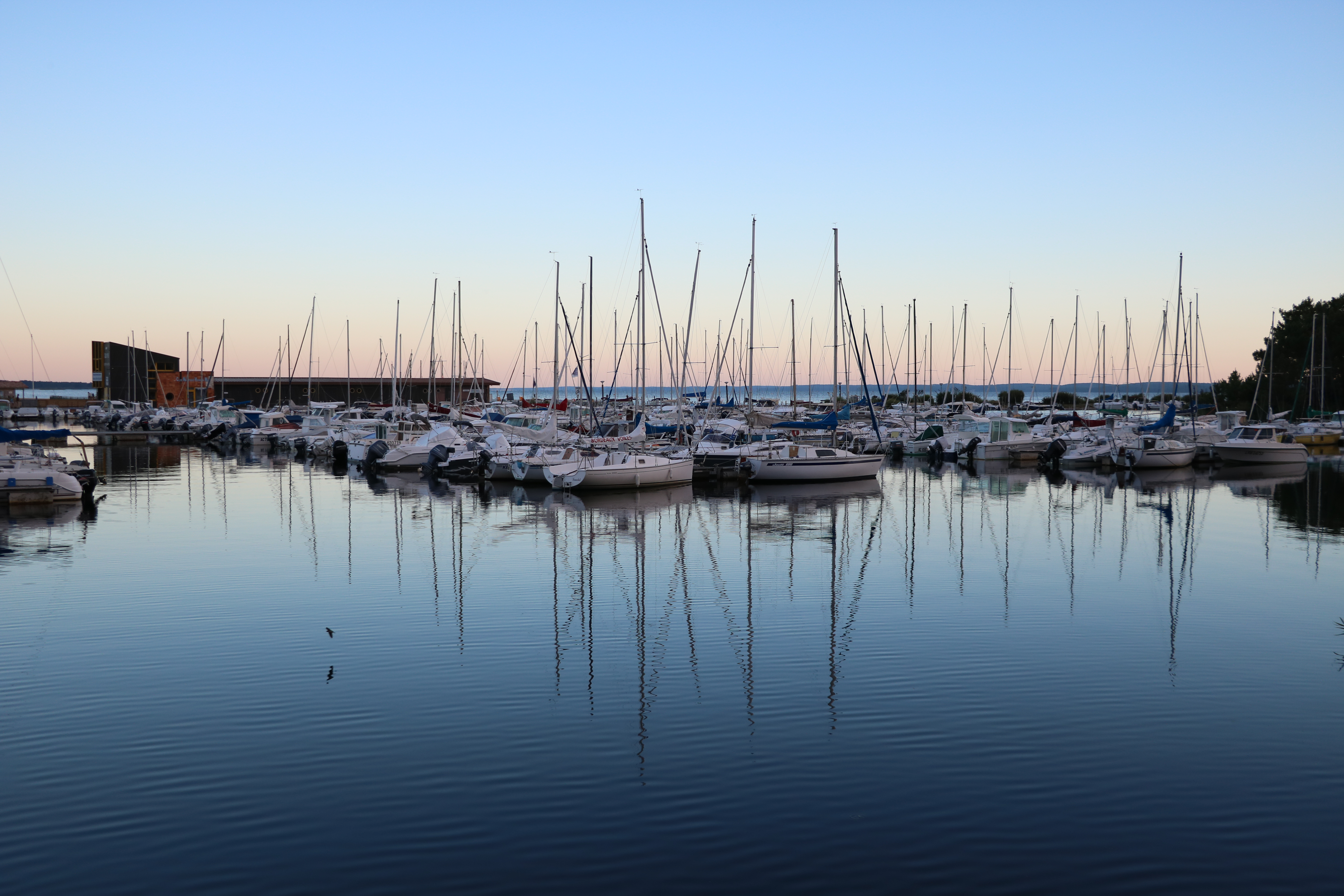
"Serge Reigniez" Marina

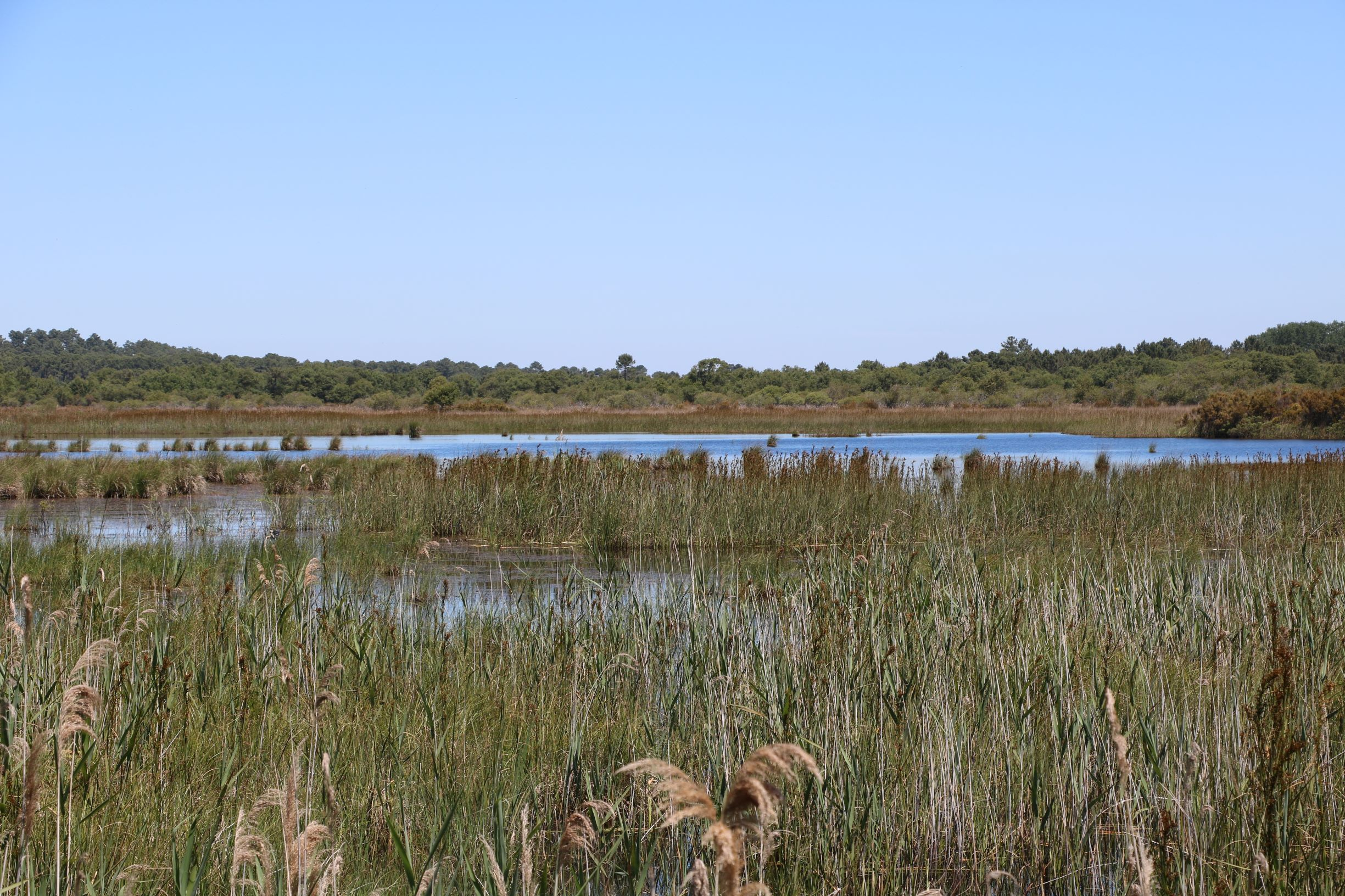
Contaut Marsh

=== Heraldry ===
Arms of Hourtin	Quartered: 1) Gules, a silver hapchot (gemmending tool); 2) Or, an anchor sable with its gum of the same; 3) Or, a lion with a leopard's tail sable; 4) Gules, a silver sailing ship seen from the front.

== Nature reserve ==
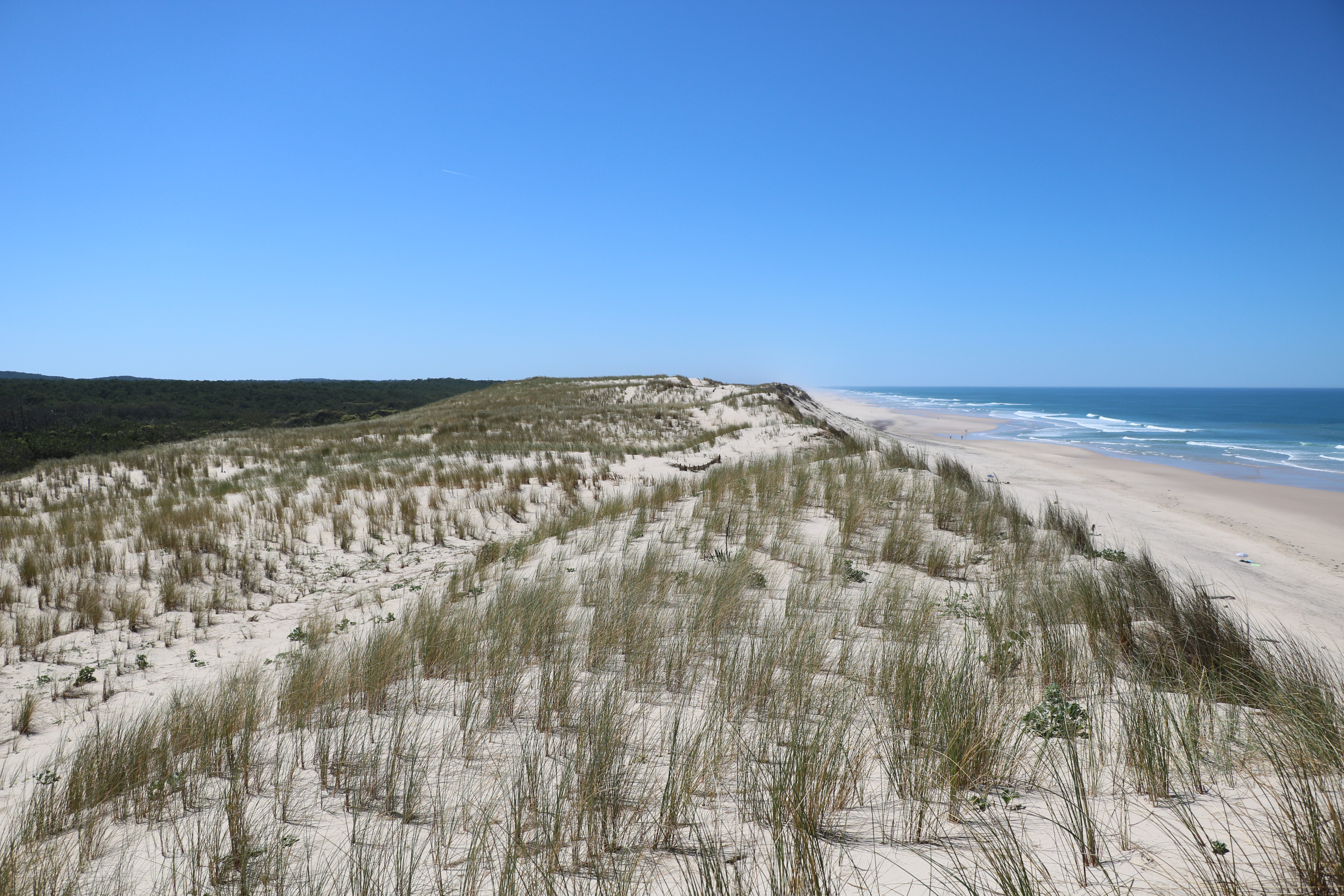
Dunes in Hourtin-Plage

The 21.5 km^{2} (8.3 sq. miles) area of dunes and marshland between the north-western shore of the lake and the Atlantic Ocean, known as the dunes et marais d'Hourtin, has been designated a nature reserve since 2009.

== Twin towns ==
Hourtin is twinned with:

- Pontarddulais, United Kingdom, Wales
- Swansea, United Kingdom, Wales

== See also ==
- Communes of the Gironde department
