= Lacanau =

- Commune
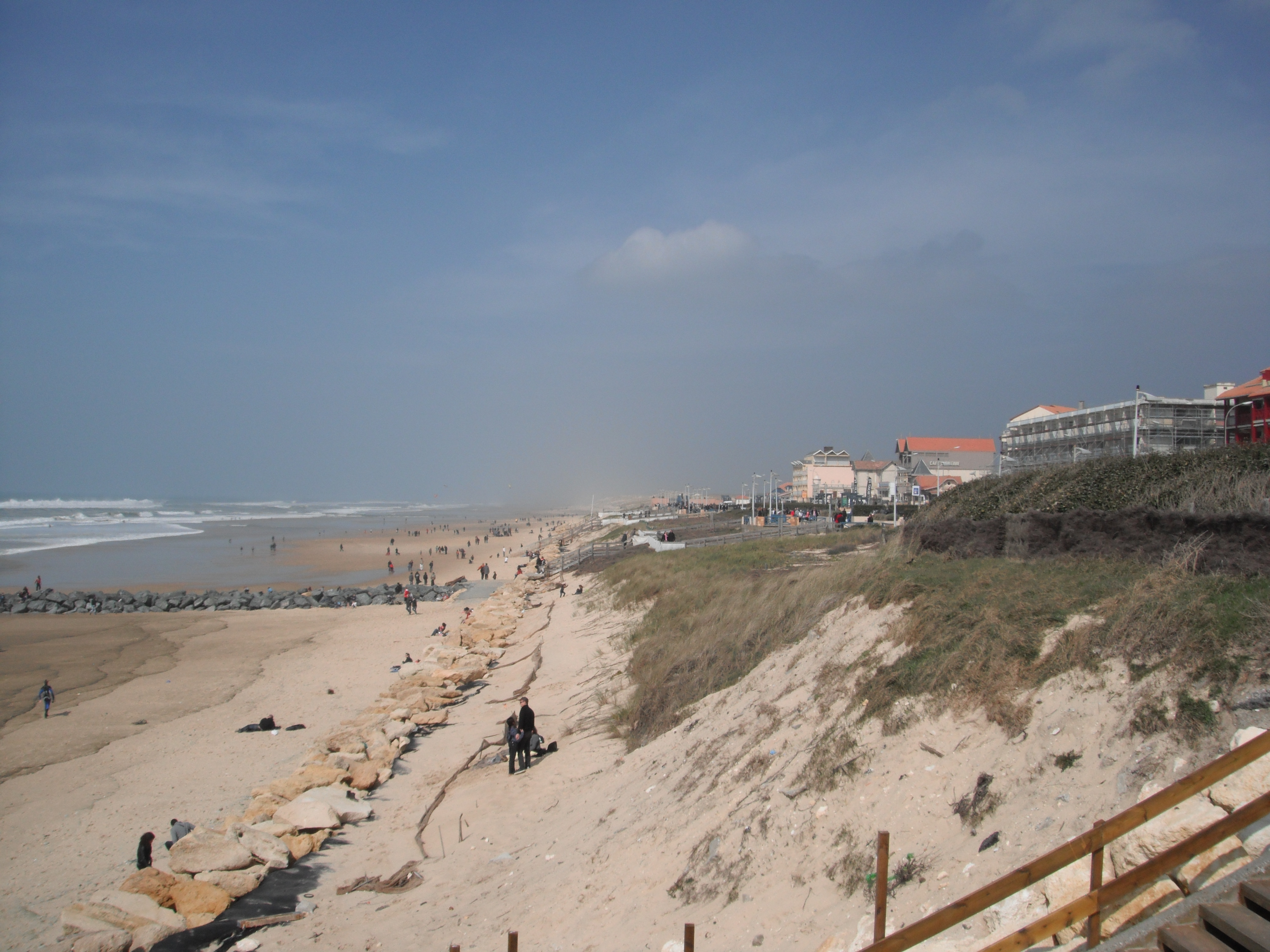
- The beach at Lacanau

- Coat of arms
- Location of Lacanau
- Location within France Location within Nouvelle-Aquitaine
- Coordinates: 44°58′49″N 1°04′42″W
- Country: France
- Region: Nouvelle-Aquitaine
- Department: Gironde
- Arrondissement: Lesparre-Médoc
- Canton: Le Sud-Médoc

Government
  - Mayor (2020–2026): Laurent Peyrondet
- Area^{1}: 214.02 km^{2} (82.63 sq mi)
- Elevation: 18 m (59 ft)
- Highest elevation: 66 m (217 ft)
- Lowest elevation: 0 m (0 ft)
- Population (2023): 5,739
  - Density: 26.82/km^{2} (69.45/sq mi)
- Time zone: UTC+01:00 (CET)
  - Summer (DST): UTC+02:00 (CEST)
- INSEE/Postal code: 33214 /33680
- ^{1} French Land Register data, which excludes lakes, ponds, glaciers > 1 km^{2} (0.386 sq mi or 247 acres) and river estuaries.

Lacanau (French pronunciation: [lakano]; Gascon: La Canau, [ˈla kaˈnaw]) is a commune in the Gironde department, Nouvelle-Aquitaine, southwestern France. Lacanau is a surfing area.

Lacanau is a member of the Community of Municipalities Médoc's Lakes which includes the municipalities of Lacanau, Carcans and Hourtin, the territory Médoc Océan.

== History ==
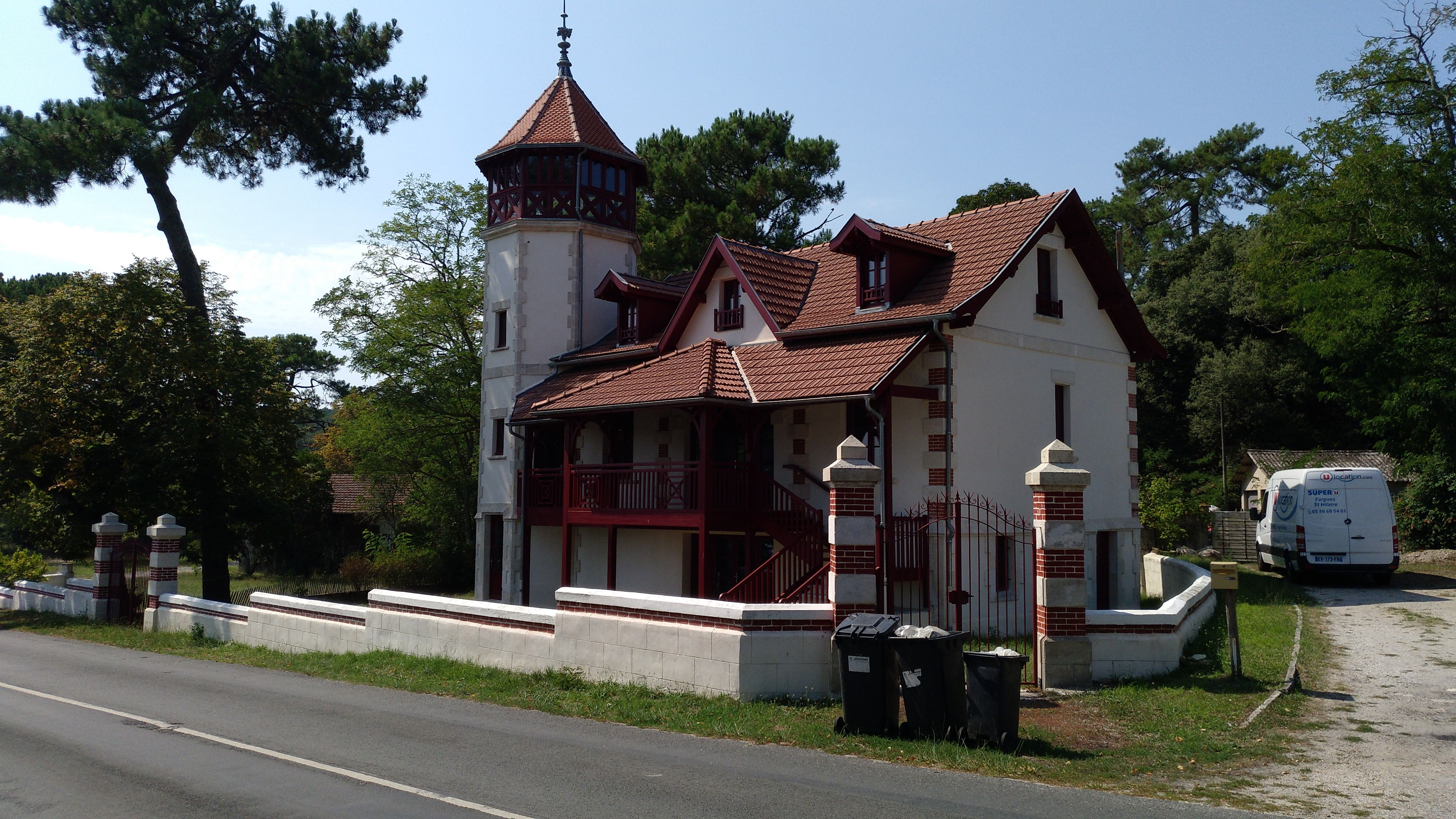
Naval Air Station Moutchic Headquarters - Villa Tour des Pins (Maison du Commandant), Le Mouchic, Lacanau

The United States Navy established a naval air station at NAS 001 Le Moutchic on 31 August 1917 to operate seaplanes during World War I. Franco-British Aviation FBA Type C seaplanes were involved in spotting German submarines.

The base closed shortly after the First Armistice at Compiègne.

== Population ==
Historical population
| Year | Pop. | ±% p.a. |
|---|---|---|
| 1968 | 1,846 | — |
| 1975 | 2,038 | +1.42% |
| 1982 | 1,961 | −0.55% |
| 1990 | 2,405 | +2.58% |
| 1999 | 3,142 | +3.01% |
| 2007 | 4,243 | +3.83% |
| 2012 | 4,493 | +1.15% |
| 2017 | 4,914 | +1.81% |
| 2023 | 5,739 | +2.62% |
Source: INSEE

== See also ==
- Communes of the Gironde department
