= Lac d'Hourtin-Carcans =

Lake in Gironde, New Aquitaine, France

Hourtin-Carcans Lake
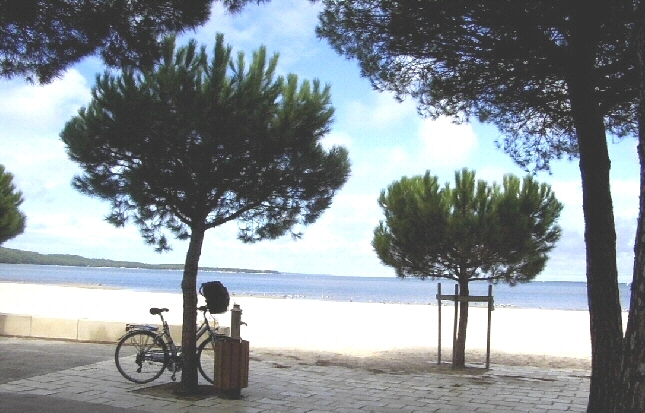
- View of the lake from Maubuisson, Carcans

- Location within Nouvelle-Aquitaine
- Location: Hourtin and Carcans, Gironde, Nouvelle-Aquitaine, France
- Coordinates: 45°8′13″N 1°6′49″W
- Basin countries: France
- Max. length: 18 km (11 mi)
- Max. width: 5 km (3.1 mi)
- Surface area: 56.67 km^{2} (21.88 sq mi)
- Max. depth: 10 m (33 ft)
- Surface elevation: 14 m (46 ft)

The Hourtin-Carcans Lake (French: lac d'Hourtin-Carcans, [lak duʁtɛ̃ kaʁkɑ̃]; Occitan: lac de Hortin e de Carcan) is a lake in the natural region of Médoc, located in the French department of Gironde, Aquitaine. It is one of the largest lakes in France, and the largest freshwater lake, by surface area, situated entirely in France. It lies at an elevation of 14 m (46 ft), and has a surface area of 56.67 km^{2} (21.88 sq. miles). In winter, its size is exceeded by Lac de Grand-Lieu in the Loire-Atlantique which expands to cover 62.92 km^{2} but shrinks to 35 km^{2} in summer.

== Geography ==
The lake, one of the Great Lakes of the Landes, extends 18 km at its longest and 5 km at its widest, parallel to the Côte d'Argent on the Atlantic Ocean.

The closest towns to Lac d'Hourtin-Carcans are Hourtin to the north east, Carcans to the south east and the resort of Maubuisson on the lake's southwestern shore.

== Nature reserve ==
The 21.5 km^{2} area of dunes and marshland between the north-western shore of the lake and the Atlantic Ocean, known as the 'dunes et marais d'Hourtin', has been designated a nature reserve since 2009.
