= Château de Gironville =

French castle

Coordinates: 45°00′46″N 0°37′02″W

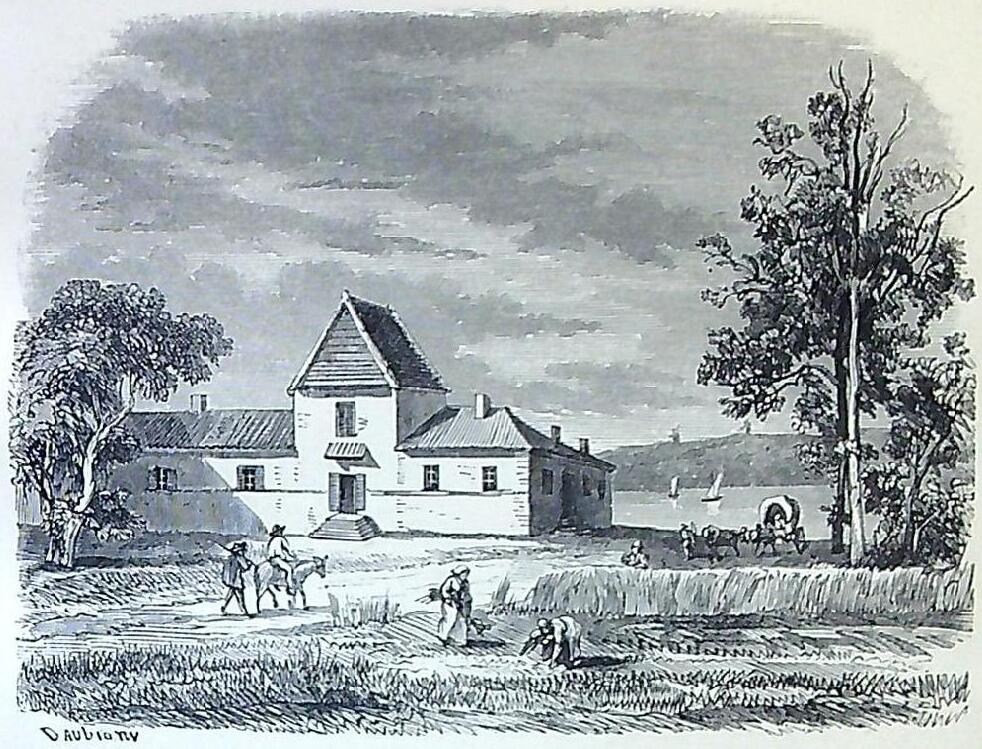
Château de Gironville

The Château de Gironville is a château in Macau, Gironde, Nouvelle-Aquitaine, France. Mr. Duffour-Dubergie established Chateau de Gironville in the late 1800s as part of a 155 hectare estate. It construction included a 35 hecares vineyard. The mayor of Bordeaux owned the estate in the early 1900s. The estate fell into disrepair during the Great Depression in the 1920s.
