= Carcans =

- Commune
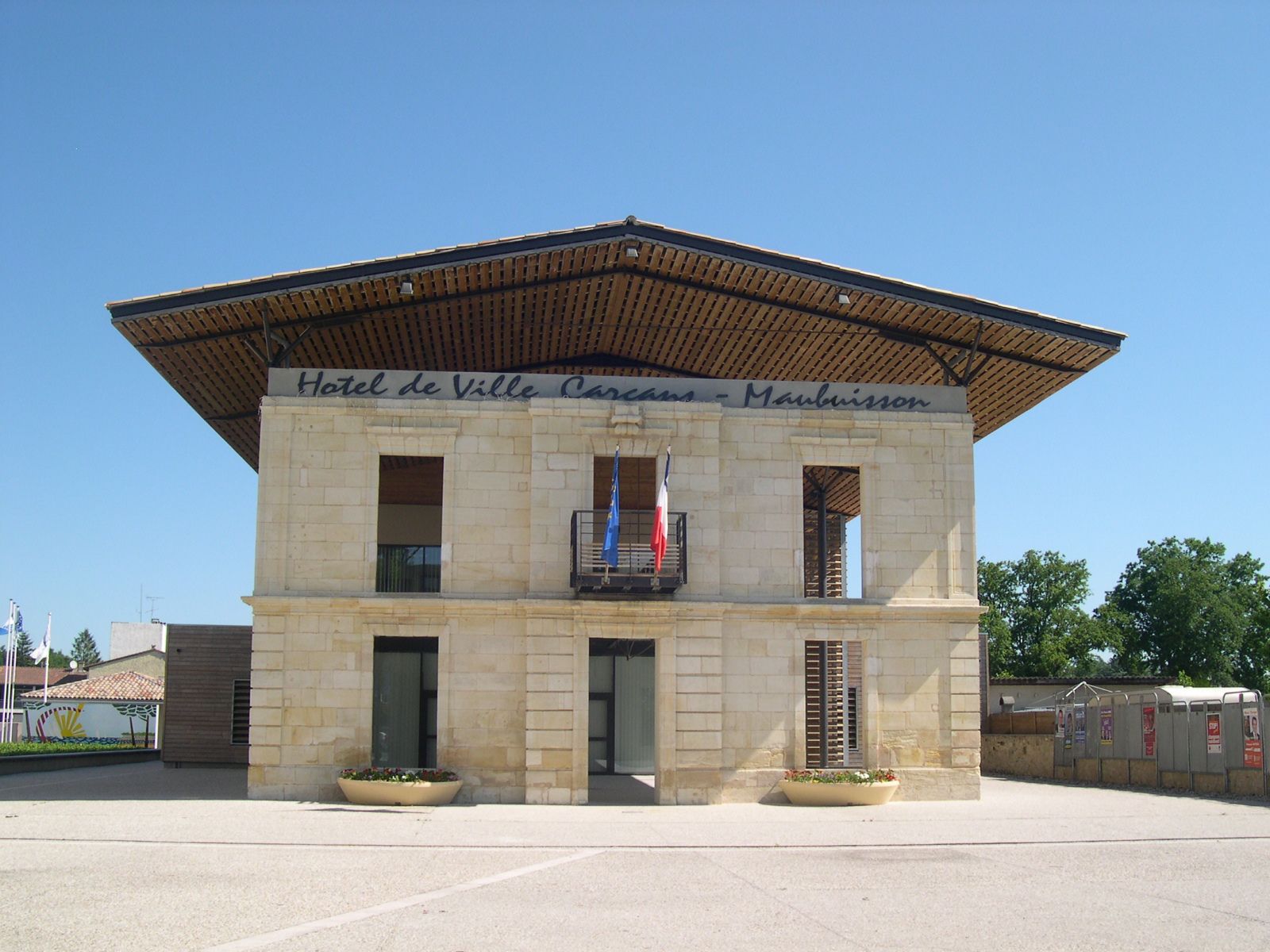
- Town hall

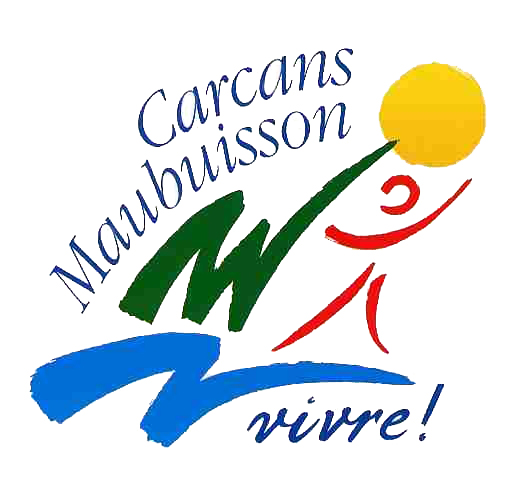
- Flag Coat of arms
- Location of Carcans
- Location within France Location within Nouvelle-Aquitaine
- Coordinates: 45°04′47″N 1°02′35″W
- Country: France
- Region: Nouvelle-Aquitaine
- Department: Gironde
- Arrondissement: Lesparre-Médoc
- Canton: Le Sud-Médoc

Government
  - Mayor (2020–2026): Patrick Meiffren
- Area^{1}: 175.4 km^{2} (67.7 sq mi)
- Highest elevation: 65 m (213 ft)
- Lowest elevation: 0 m (0 ft)
- Population (2023): 2,415
  - Density: 13.77/km^{2} (35.66/sq mi)
- Demonym: Carcanais·e (French)
- Time zone: UTC+01:00 (CET)
  - Summer (DST): UTC+02:00 (CEST)
- INSEE/Postal code: 33097 /33121
- ^{1} French Land Register data, which excludes lakes, ponds, glaciers > 1 km^{2} (0.386 sq mi or 247 acres) and river estuaries.

Carcans (French pronunciation: [kaʁkɑ̃]; Occitan: Carcan [kaɾˈka] or Carcans) is a French commune in the department of Gironde, and the administrative region of Nouvelle-Aquitaine (before 2015: Aquitaine).

Carcans is one of the 14 members of the commune community of Médoc Atlantique.

== Geography ==
=== Location ===
Situated about 50 km of Bordeaux, Médoc, Carcans is a seaside resort between the Atlantic Ocean and the Hourtin-Carcans Lake.

=== Places ===
It includes 5 settlements : Carcans, the administrative centre (in the town's same name); Pouch (IPA: [puʃ]), situated between forest and marsh; Maubuisson (IPA: [mobɥisɔ̃]), the tour resort created 1960–1970; Bombannes (IPA: [bɔ̃ban]), a sport area near the lake; Carcans-Plage (IPA: [kaʁkɑ̃ plaʒ]), the seaside resort on the border of the ocean.

== Population ==
Historical population

Year	Pop.	±% p.a.
1793	940	—
1800	732	−3.51%
1806	830	+2.12%
1821	894	+0.50%
1831	1,005	+1.18%
1836	1,065	+1.17%
1841	1,050	−0.28%
1846	1,069	+0.36%
1851	1,019	−0.95%
1856	1,100	+1.54%
1861	1,107	+0.13%
1866	1,094	−0.24%
1872	1,009	−1.34%
1876	968	−1.03%
1881	960	−0.17%
1886	923	−0.78%
1891	954	+0.66%
1896	909	−0.96%
1901	906	−0.07%

Year	Pop.	±% p.a.
1906	926	+0.44%
1911	1,035	+2.25%
1921	995	−0.39%
1926	1,075	+1.56%
1931	1,094	+0.35%
1936	990	−1.98%
1946	937	−0.55%
1954	1,027	+1.15%
1962	1,049	+0.27%
1968	1,134	+1.31%
1975	1,155	+0.26%
1982	1,242	+1.04%
1990	1,503	+2.41%
1999	1,551	+0.35%
2007	2,114	+3.95%
2012	2,267	+1.41%
2017	2,413	+1.26%
2023	2,415	+0.01%

Source: EHESS and INSEE (1968-2023)

== See also ==
- Communes of the Gironde department
