= Saint-Yzans-de-Médoc =

Saint-Yzans-de-Médoc Sent Idènç (Occitan)
- Commune
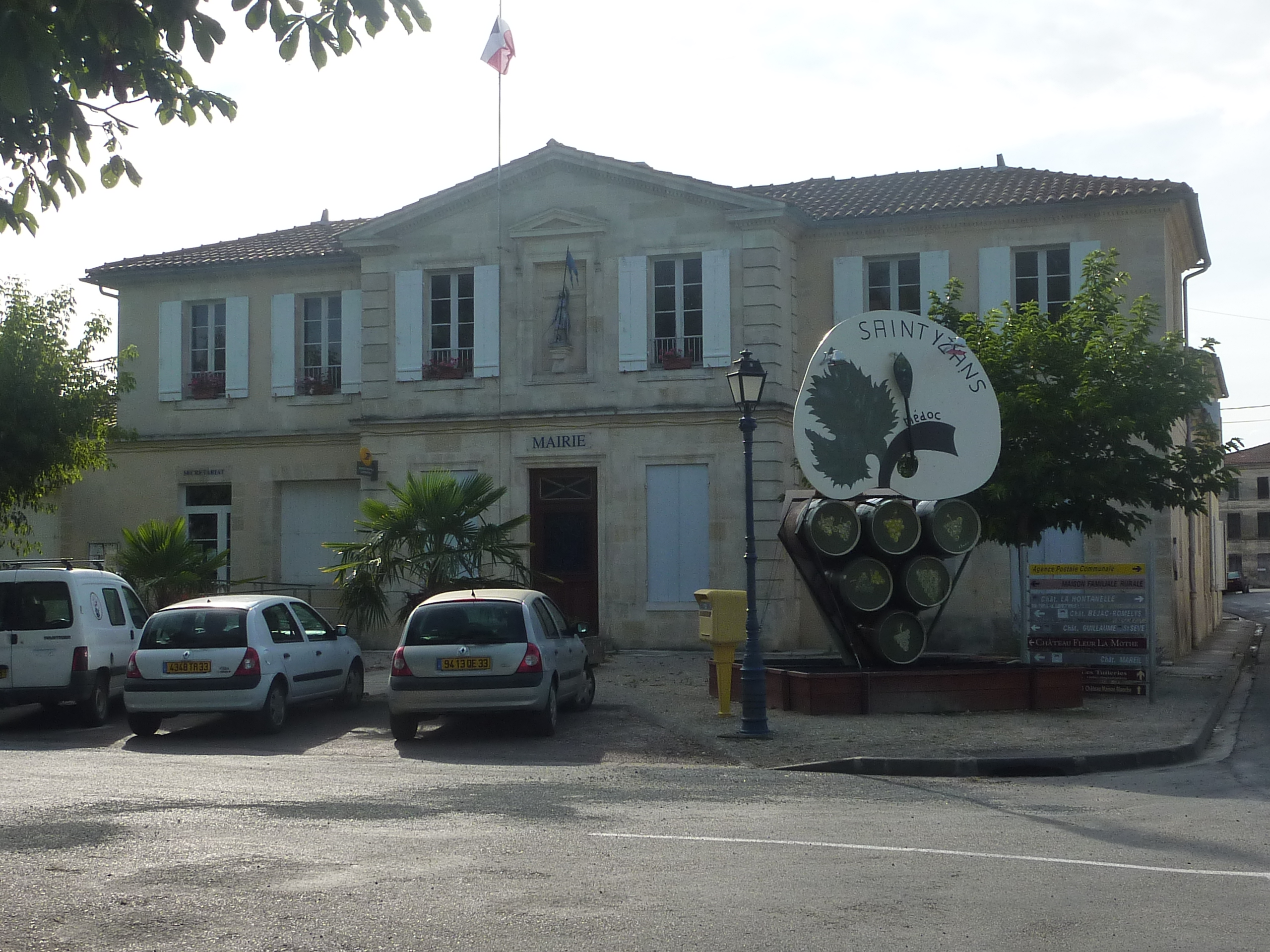
- The town hall in Saint-Yzans-de-Médoc
- Location of Saint-Yzans-de-Médoc
- Location within France Location within Nouvelle-Aquitaine
- Coordinates: 45°19′23″N 0°49′14″W
- Country: France
- Region: Nouvelle-Aquitaine
- Department: Gironde
- Arrondissement: Lesparre-Médoc
- Canton: Le Nord-Médoc
- Intercommunality: CC Médoc Cœur de Presqu'île

Government
  - Mayor (2020–2026): Dominique Lajugie
- Area^{1}: 11.54 km^{2} (4.46 sq mi)
- Highest elevation: 14 m (46 ft)
- Lowest elevation: 0 m (0 ft)
- Population (2023): 349
  - Density: 30.2/km^{2} (78.3/sq mi)
- Demonym: Saint-Yzannais
- Time zone: UTC+01:00 (CET)
  - Summer (DST): UTC+02:00 (CEST)
- INSEE/Postal code: 33493 /33340
- ^{1} French Land Register data, which excludes lakes, ponds, glaciers > 1 km^{2} (0.386 sq mi or 247 acres) and river estuaries.

Saint-Yzans-de-Médoc (French pronunciation: [sɛ̃t‿izɑ̃ d(ə) medɔk]; lit. 'St Yzans of Médoc'; Occitan: Sent Idènç or Sent Idènç de Medòc; Gascon: Sent Dicenç or Sent Dicenç de Medoc), or simply Saint-Yzans, is a rural commune in the Gironde department, Nouvelle-Aquitaine, southwestern France. It is on the Gironde estuary.

== Population ==
Historical population
Year	Pop.	±% p.a.
1968	429	—
1975	419	−0.34%
1982	441	+0.73%
1990	427	−0.40%
1999	473	+1.14%
2007	396	−2.20%
2012	393	−0.15%
2017	374	−0.99%
2023	349	−1.15%
Source: INSEE

== See also ==
- Communes of the Gironde department
