= Saint-Sauveur, Gironde =

Saint-Sauveur
- Commune
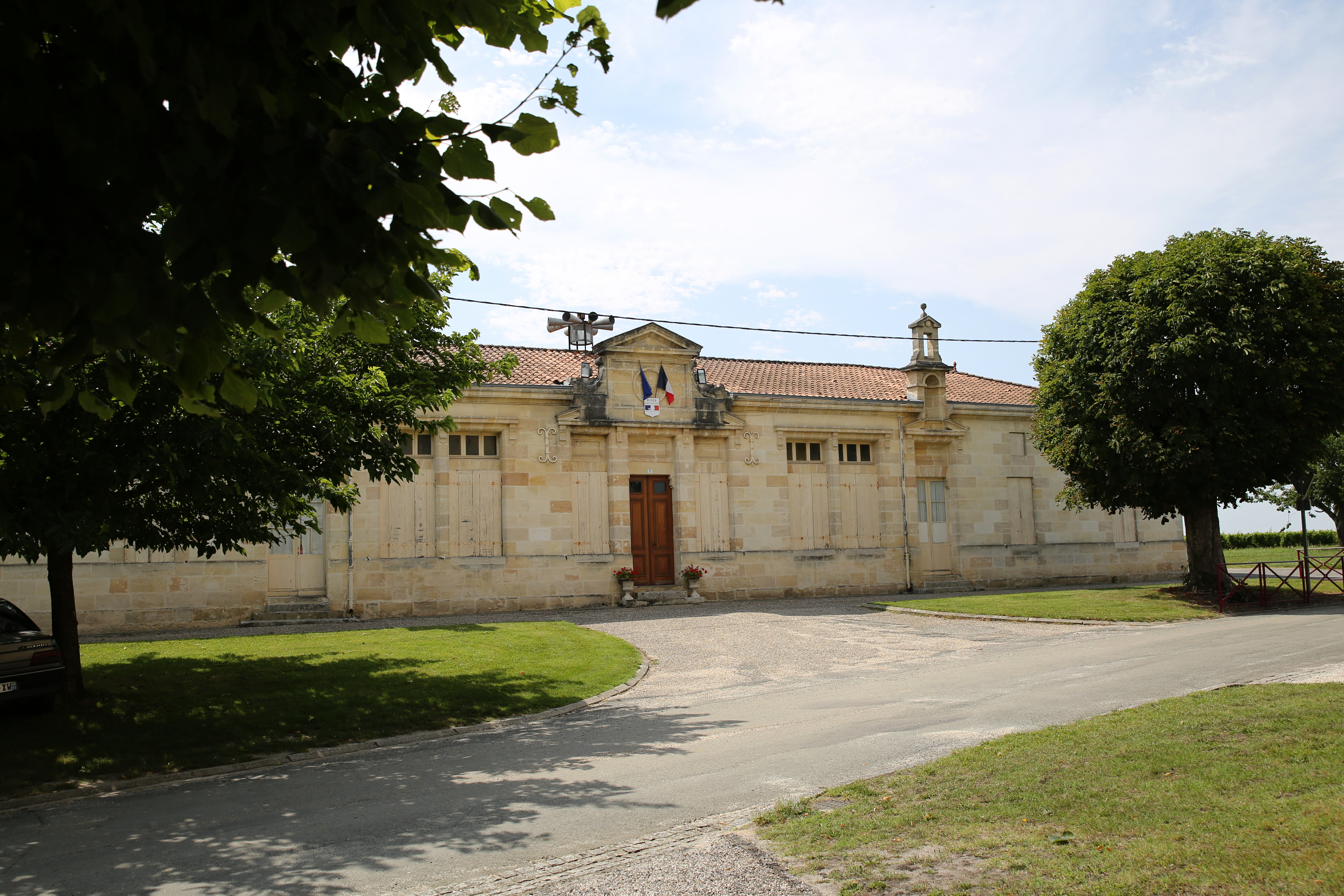
- The town hall in Saint-Sauveur

- Coat of arms
- Location of Saint-Sauveur
- Location within France Location within Nouvelle-Aquitaine
- Coordinates: 45°12′11″N 0°50′01″W
- Country: France
- Region: Nouvelle-Aquitaine
- Department: Gironde
- Arrondissement: Lesparre-Médoc
- Canton: Le Nord-Médoc

Government
  - Mayor (2020–2026): Serge Raynaud
- Area^{1}: 21.89 km^{2} (8.45 sq mi)
- Elevation: 109 m (358 ft)
- Highest elevation: 33 m (108 ft)
- Lowest elevation: 5 m (16 ft)
- Population (2023): 1,245
  - Density: 56.88/km^{2} (147.3/sq mi)
- Time zone: UTC+01:00 (CET)
  - Summer (DST): UTC+02:00 (CEST)
- INSEE/Postal code: 33471 /33250
- ^{1} French Land Register data, which excludes lakes, ponds, glaciers > 1 km^{2} (0.386 sq mi or 247 acres) and river estuaries.

Saint-Sauveur (French pronunciation: [sɛ̃ sovœʁ]; Gascon: Sent Sauvador) is a commune in the Gironde department in Nouvelle-Aquitaine in southwestern France.

The Haut-Médoc AOC winery Château Hourtin-Ducasse is located in the commune.

== Population ==
Historical population
Year	Pop.	±% p.a.
1968	682	—
1975	792	+2.16%
1982	924	+2.23%
1990	1,137	+2.63%
1999	1,189	+0.50%
2007	1,241	+0.54%
2012	1,286	+0.71%
2017	1,312	+0.40%
2023	1,245	−0.87%
Source: INSEE

== See also ==
- Communes of the Gironde department
