= Château Hourtin-Ducasse =

French castle

Coordinates: 45.191°N 0.8°W

Château Hourtin-Ducasse is a vineyard in Saint-Sauveur, Gironde, Nouvelle-Aquitaine, France. It forms part of the Haut-Médoc AOC.
