= History of French cattle breeding =

Cattle farming in France

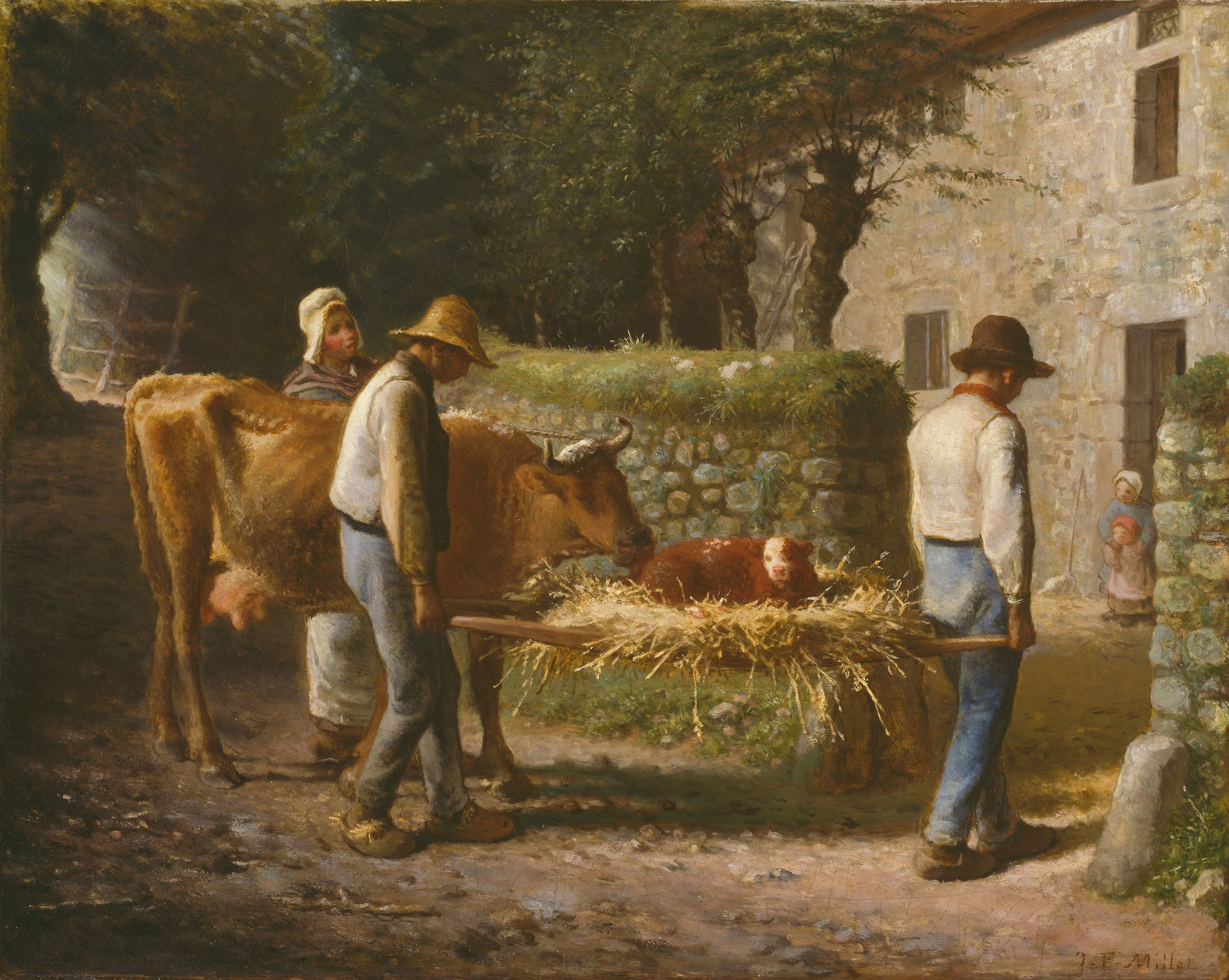
Paysans ramenant à la maison un veau né dans les champs, Jean-François Millet, 1864.

The history of French cattle breeding results from intermingling bovine populations from several European offshoots after centuries of breeding and selection practices. The French herd includes crosses with zebus (Bos taurus indicus) in the French overseas departments and territories.

In 2010, the French cattle population numbered 19.3 million head.

Cows in production represented 7.7 million head (4.2 suckling and 3.5 dairy), and milk production in 2005 was 239 million hectolitres.

== Diverse origins ==
The domestication of Bos taurus is thought to have occurred in the Fertile Crescent. From then on, cattle accompanied people on their migrations. According to Philippe J. Dubois, the bovine species arrived in Europe via three routes: from the Danube, the shores of the Mediterranean, and North Africa via the Strait of Gibraltar. Studies have not revealed interbreeding between these domesticated cattle and their wild ancestor, the Aurochs.

Some breeds, such as the Camargue and Corsican, may have lived in their territory for long.

Numerous branches have appeared with the great population movements since Antiquity:

- Rameau blond: (blonde d'Aquitaine, Limousin). It may be indigenous to southwestern Europe, as several breeds of this type also exist in Spain and Portugal: Rubia Gallega and asturiana de los valles.
- Rameau Celtique (Bretonne Pie Noir, Froment du Léon, Jersiaise)
- Steppe grey, brought by the Visigoths: Gasconne.
- Rameau Pie rouge from the mountains spilled over from the Alps: Abondance, Montbéliarde, and Simmental.
- Baltic red with Flemish red, brought over by trade in the Middle Ages.
- Cattle breeds from the North Sea Coast were imported to improve the dairy potential of French breeds from the 18th to the twentieth century: Prim'Holstein and Bleue du Nord.
- Nordic branch: the Normande would have benefited from Viking livestock brought over in the 19th century and the Vosgienne from cattle introduced by Swedish soldiers in the 18th century.
- British breeds: Shorthorn blood was injected into many breeds in the country's northwest in the 18th and 19th centuries, helping to improve meat potential: Normande, Armoricaine, Rouge des Prés, Saosnoise.
- Hereford, imported in the 1960s, is now an official breed, although numbers remain low. More recently, the Canadienne was introduced in 1995 and 1999 for historical reasons: a breed of French origin exported to Quebec, it is now coming back after a rigorous selection process.
- Use of zebu: Brahmane in Martinique, Creole in Guadeloupe, a half-breed of zebu, and Hispanic breeds such as Criollo or Moka in Reunion Island.
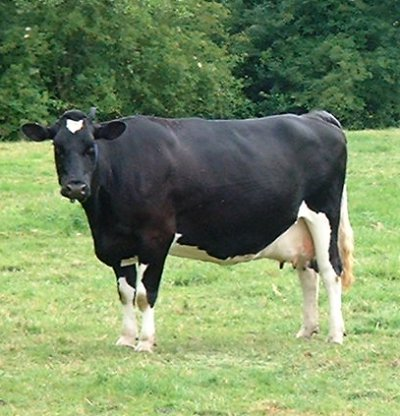
  Prim'Holstein.
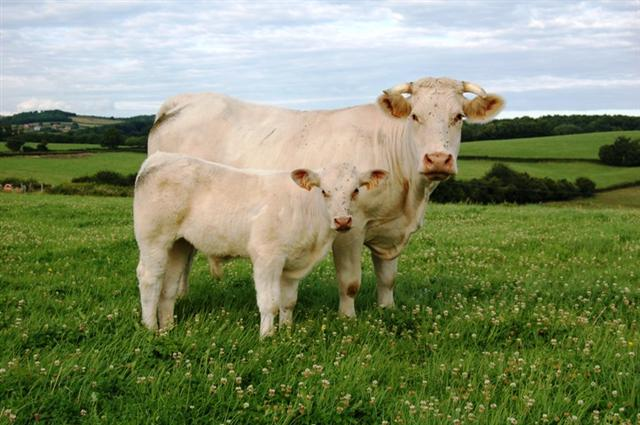
  Charolais.
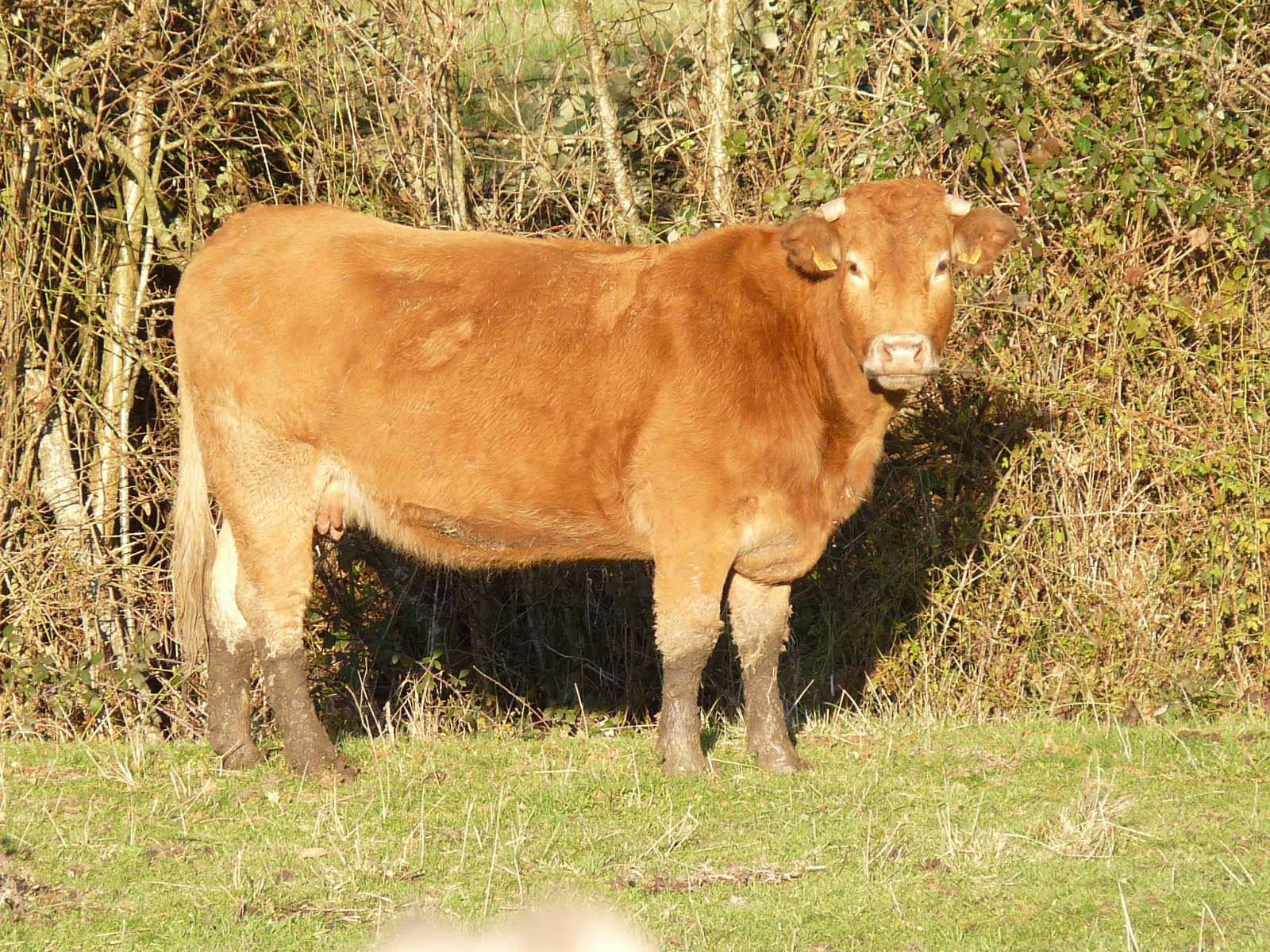
  Limousin.
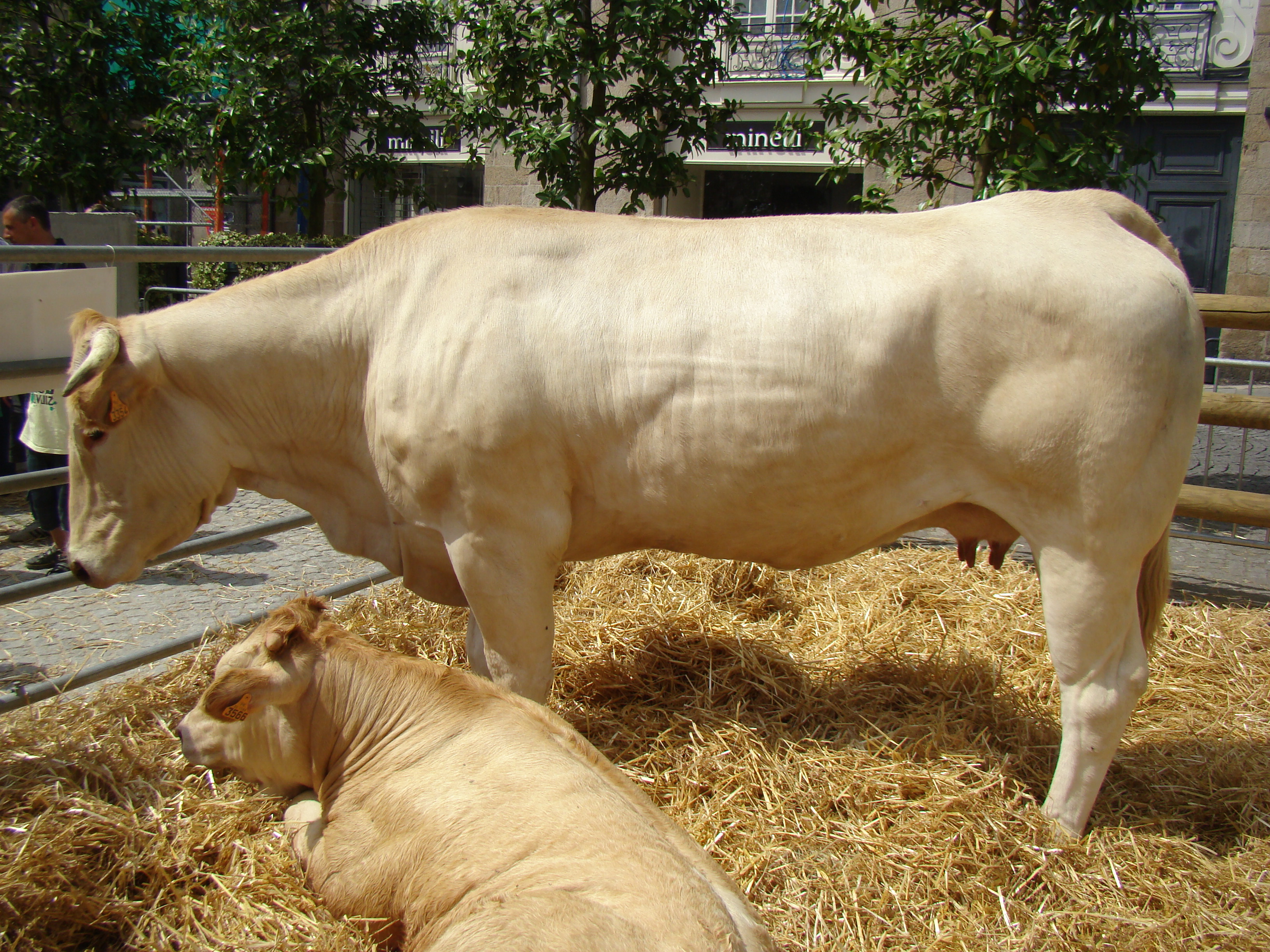
  Blonde d'Aquitaine.
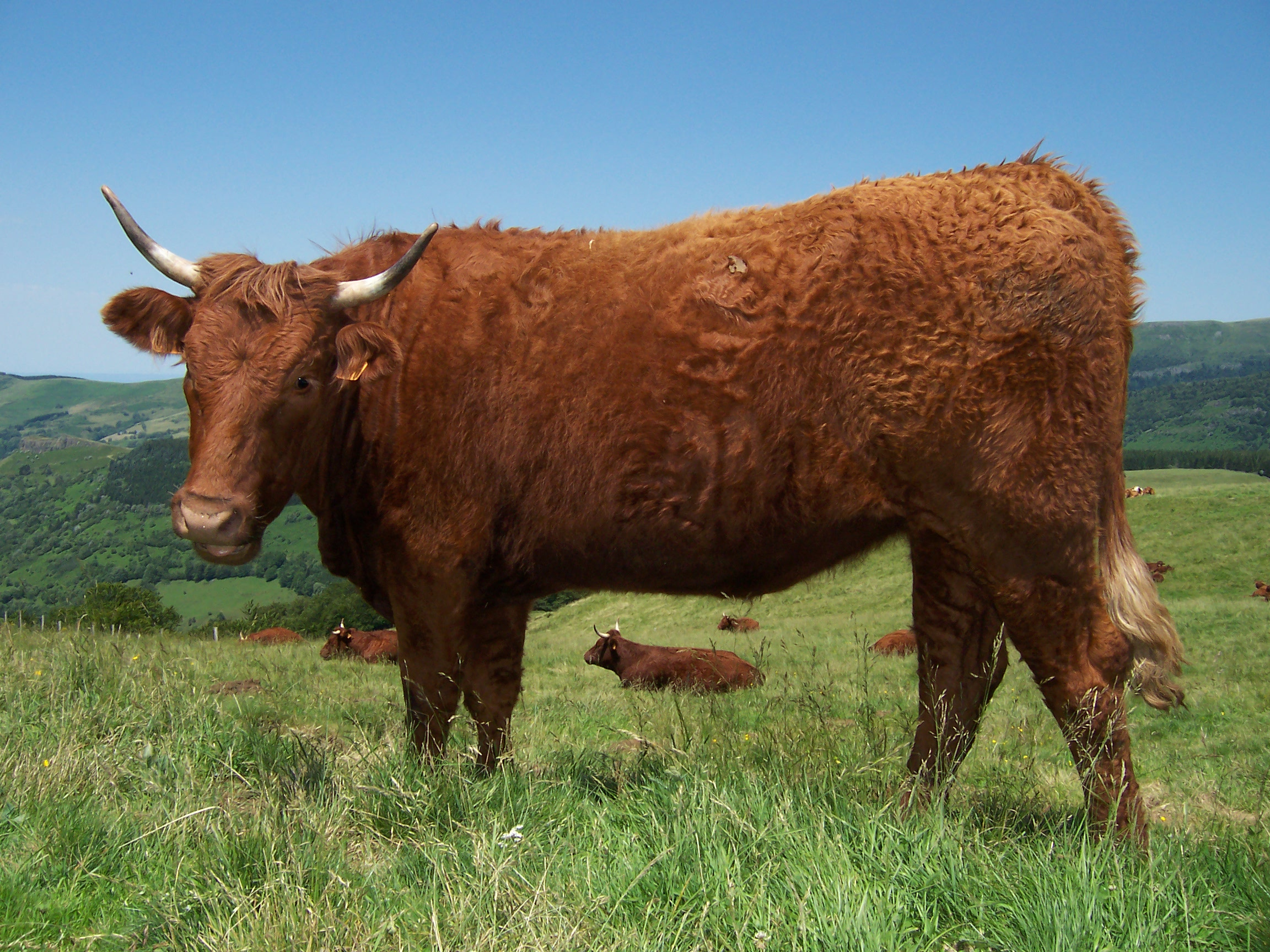
  Salers.
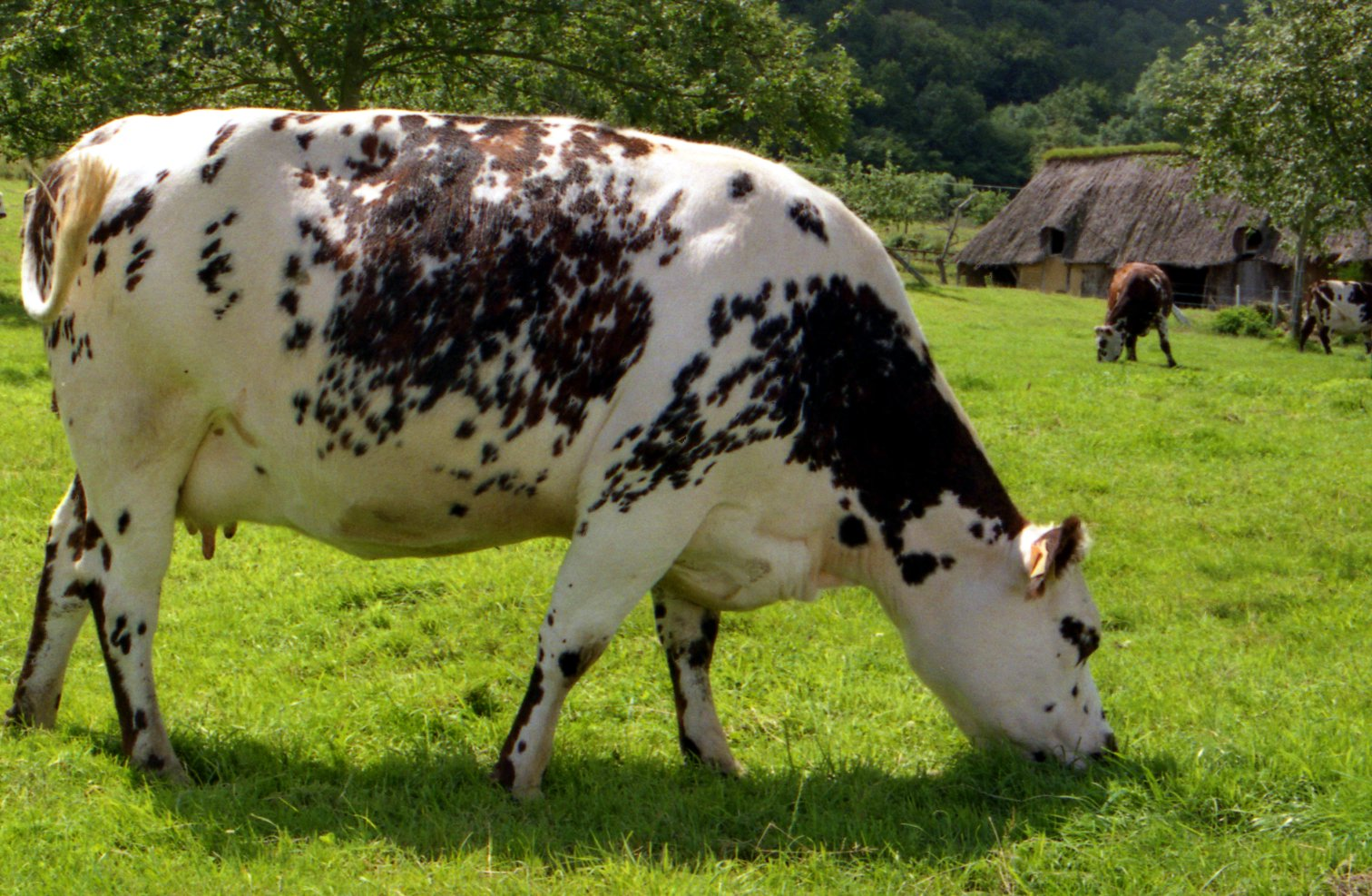
  Normande.
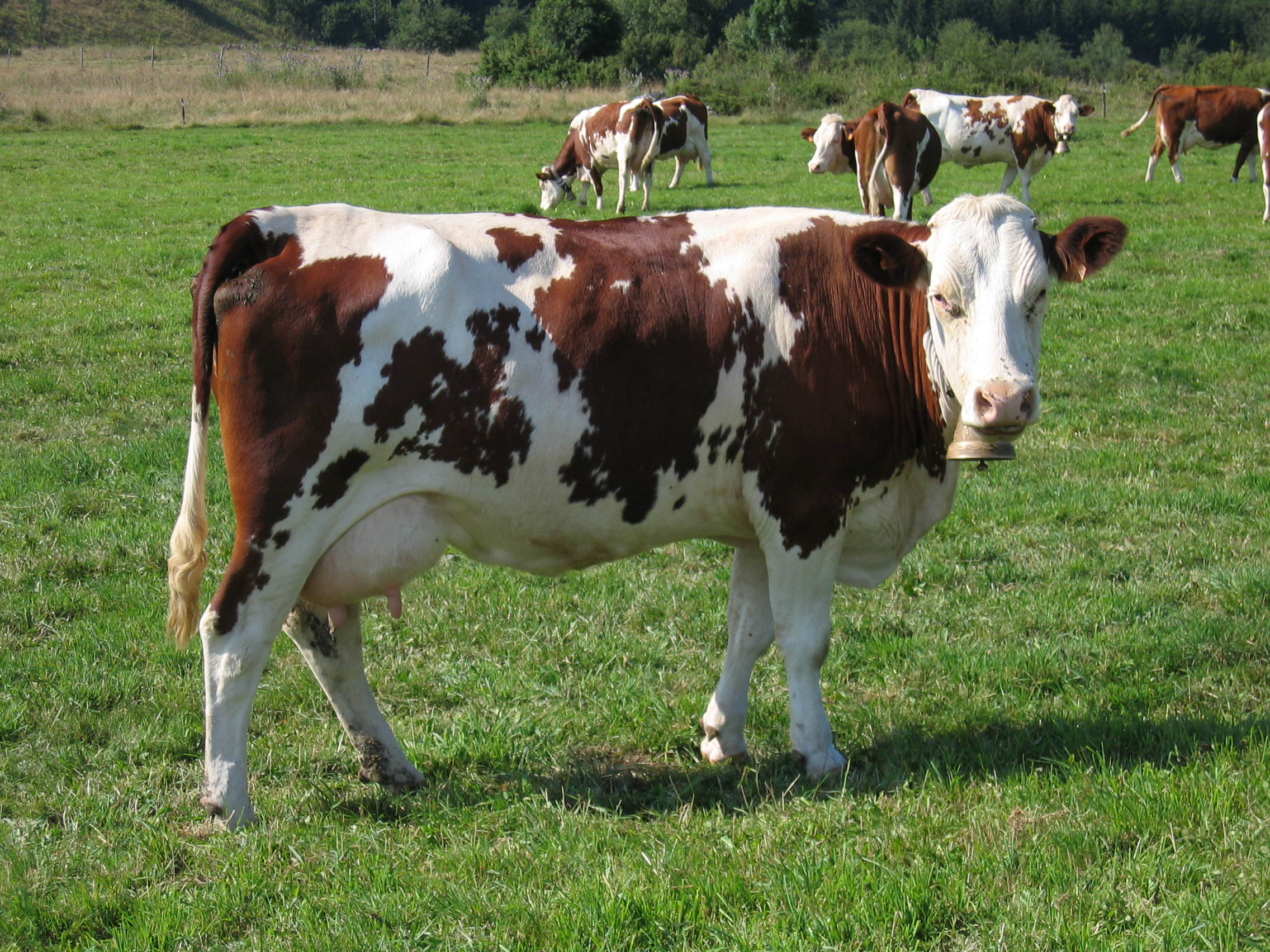
  Montbéliarde.

== Breeding ==
From these elements, each region, and even each mountain valley, has selected a breed that corresponds to its needs and the difficulties of its terroir (climate and soil).

Cattle breeding has always had several economic interests: milk supply (formerly destined mainly for cheese and butter production), meat, and leather. In regions where heavy draft horses were unavailable, this function was delegated to work oxen or robust cows (southwest, Massif Central, Alps, etc.).

Selection work began in the abbeys. The monk's work is not lost between generations. The Aubrac and Abondance breeds are of monastic origin.

== Breed selection ==
With the enclosure movement, wealthy British landowners began to take an interest in the profitability of their livestock from the 18th century onwards. Around 1760, Robert Bakewell, a British breeder, began to select cattle, sheep, and horses through inbreeding and feed improvement. He significantly improved the performance of what would become the Longhorn breed. In 1785, the Colling brothers applied the same methods to the future shorthorn. This easy-to-fatten breed was to become a sensation in Europe. In Switzerland, in 1775, the first herd-book was created for the mountain gray breed of the territorial abbey of Einsiedeln.

Until the beginning of the 20th century, farmers paid little attention to their livestock selection as long as they could survive. It was not until the 19th century, under the influence of England, that owners began to select animals to improve their performance. Most of today's cattle breeds were born at this time and result from crossbreeding and genetic research to obtain versatile (working breed, milk, and meat producer) or specialized animals. From the outset, the Shorthorn breed spread rapidly worldwide, particularly in France from 1830 onwards, where it became the benchmark cow for some thirty years.

The introduction of agricultural shows by the Minister of Trade and Agriculture Adolphe Thiers (1833) and breeding competitions (1850) contributed to this improvement in livestock numbers.

Three phenomena took place:

- Introduction of exogenous blood: This influence began in the 18th century and lasted almost two hundred years. The meat potential of northwestern French breeds was improved mainly by adding British Shorthorn, resulting in heavy breeds with high growth rates: Rouge des Prés, armoricaine, saosnoise or normande. These crossbreeds replaced the breeds that had disappeared at the time: Mancelle, Percheronne, Cotentine, Augeronne, Cauchoise, and Breton Pie Rouge.
- Rigorous selection of breeds' genetic characteristics: This later approach (second half of the 19th century) resulted in specialized breeds of sufficient quality that they did not need to be crossed. The most successful of these is the Charolais. Draft breeds have also benefited from their powerful morphology to produce excellent meat breeds: Charolais, Blonde d'Aquitaine, Limousin, and Bazadaise.
- Creation of herd books: This movement began with horses (national stud farms under Napoleon to supply the cavalry for the war) and was extended to other bred species by establishing morphological characteristics and selection plans. From individual breeding by wealthy owners, selection became collective and extended to all breeders.

== Modern breeds ==
In 1945, France had a food deficit. The political authorities encouraged productivity and the modernization of agriculture. Some envisaged an ideal scheme involving a dairy breed, the French Frisonne Pie Noir, and a beef breed, the Charolais.

This project underwent many adjustments designed to obtain well-adapted regional breeds. The Montbéliarde and Limousin breeds, which are highly efficient in their local environment, are favored. Blondes from the southwest were merged into the new Blonde d'Aquitaine breed, while Mirandaise was absorbed into Gasconne and Armoricaine into Pie Rouge des Plaines. The aim remains to keep a core of highly profitable breeds and to encourage artificial insemination: the less profitable "old breeds" are thus diluted and disappear.

This work of selecting the most productive breeds was quickly recognized abroad. At the same time, cholesterol was discovered to be present in beef. Breeds selected for work under the yoke had a much lower cholesterol level, and the French breeds produced the highest yields.

However, a few grains of sand were to disrupt this well-oiled machine.

- Some breeds are better adapted to their terroir of origin, and the reputation of the products they produce protects them. For example, the AOC decrees for Savoyard cheeses specify a limit of 5,000 kg of milk per lactation. The Abondance and Tarentaise (or Tarine) breeds are thus better adapted and dairy enough to reach this quota.
- The arrival of highly specialized dairy breeds has made breeding certain breeds unprofitable. But their ancient selection for milk and work has served them well, enabling them to become new suckler breeds: Aubrac, Parthenaise, Bleue du Nord, and Salers. Consumption trends call for calves raised under mother's milk. Meat breeds sometimes lack the milk to feed their calves exclusively for long periods. Mixed breeds, therefore, offer interesting crosses with meat breed bulls.
- Montbéliarde breeders resisted merging their herds with the Eastern Red Pied. They won the day, and their breed is now the most productive of the Pie Rouge mountain breeds.
- Genetic research has begun a movement to safeguard the low-productivity breeds still available from a few breeders to retain a genetic variability that may be useful in the future. This movement is supported by a strong sense of belonging among breeders, who wish to preserve these pure ancestral breeds selected over centuries based on precise criteria (e.g., the Mirandaise breed for its pulling ability, calmness, and hardiness). This phenomenon has even resisted merging breeds: the Armoricaine has not totally disappeared in the Pie Rouge des Plaines, nor the Béarnaise and lourdaise in the blonde d'Aquitaine. Once denigrated, this behavior is now encouraged: breeders of small breeds receive aid to maintain their herds as purebreds.

== Disappearing breeds ==
Several breeds disappeared during this reorganization of agriculture.

- When the southwestern blond breeds were merged to form the Blonde d'Aquitaine in 1962, the Blonde des Pyrénées, Blonde Garonnaise, and Blonde du Quercy were eliminated. Only Béarnaise and lourdaise remained.
- In the Rhône-Alpes region, a variety of so-called "blondes du sud-est" breeds, such as Mézine and Bressanne. Only the Villard-de-Lans has survived, again thanks to a group of die-hard breeders. The breed seems to have been saved, with numbers reaching the 1,000 mark and registered for the Bleu du Vercors-Sassenage AOC production. A butcher's AOC has also been created: fin gras du Mézenc. This AOC was based on the reputation of Mezine fat cattle, but the Limousin, Aubrac, and Charolais breeds benefited, and the AOC arrived too late to save the breed.
- The Bordeaux breed also succumbed to crossbreeding. However, it was possible to reconstitute it from crossbred individuals displaying the breed's characteristics.

== Conclusion ==
Today, France has a considerable number of breeds. This genetic variability is further accentuated by the fact that almost all European branches are represented.

France is recognized as a major cheese-producing country, and its lean meat breeds are in great demand, leading to the export of breeding stock to every continent.

- Montbéliarde is the strongest milk producer in the pie rouge mountain breed.
- Blonde d'Aquitaine and Limousin are the heaviest of the blond and red breeds.
- The Salers is one of the most efficient calf feeders in the blond and red breeds.
- In the brown branch, the Parthenaise breed is the heaviest.

In the European Union, calves under 8 weeks of age can be kept in very small individual cages. The Compassion in World Farming association opposes this practice: "These young calves have already been taken from their mothers at birth, usually at the age of one day, after the first colostrum feedings. Already stressed by maternal separation, they need contact with other calves".

== See also ==
- List of French cattle breeds
- Villard-de-Lans (cattle breed)

== Bibliography ==
- Reynaud, Florian (2010). L'élevage bovin : De l'agronome au paysan (1700–1850). Histoire (in French). Presses universitaires de Rennes. ISBN 978-2-7535-1228-3.
- Denis, Bernard; Avon, Laurent (2010). Races bovines : Histoire, aptitudes, situation actuelle (in French). Castor & Pollux. ISBN 978-2-35008-026-0.
- Dubois, Philippe J. (2011). À nos vaches... : Inventaire des races bovines disparues et menacées de France (in French). Delachaux et Niestlé. ISBN 978-2-603-01707-4.
- Dubois, Philippe J. (2017). Toutes les vaches de France : d'hier, d'aujourd'hui et de demain (in French). Delachaux et Niestlé. ISBN 978-2-603-02456-0.
- Dervillé, Marie; Patin, Stéphane; Avon, Laurent (2009). Races bovines de France : origine, standard, sélection (in French). Agricole Editions.
