= List of French cattle breeds =

This is a list of the cattle breeds considered in France to be wholly or partly of French origin. Some may have complex or obscure histories, so inclusion here does not necessarily imply that a breed is predominantly or exclusively French. The list includes breeds from the overseas territories of France.

== Indigenous breeds ==
Local name(s)	English name, if used	Notes	Image
Abondance^{[1]}^{[2]}			
Alpha 16^{[2]}			
Armoricaine^{[1]}^{[2]}	Armorican		
Aubrac^{[1]}^{[2]}			
Bazadaise^{[1]}^{[2]}			
Béarnaise^{[1]}^{[2]}			
Betizu^{[1]}^{[2]}			
Bleue de Bazougers^{[1]}^{[2]}			
Bleue du Nord^{[1]}^{[2]}			
Blonde d'Aquitaine^{[1]}^{[2]}			
Bordelais (extinct)^{[2]}			
Bordelaise^{[1]}^{[2]}			
Bretonne Pie Noir^{[1]}^{[2]}			
Brune ^{[1]}^{[2]}	French Brown		
Casta or Aure et Saint-Girons^{[1]}^{[2]}			
Charolaise^{[1]}^{[2]}	Charolais		
Corse^{[1]}^{[2]}			
Créole Guadeloupe^{[1]}^{[2]}			
Créole Martinique^{[1]}^{[2]}			
Ferrandaise^{[1]}^{[2]}			
Flamande Originelle^{[1]}^{[2]}			
Froment du Léon^{[1]}^{[2]}			
Gasconne^{[1]}^{[2]}			
Inra 95^{[1]}^{[2]}			
Limousine^{[1]}^{[2]}	Limousin		
Lourdaise^{[1]}^{[2]}			
Maraîchine^{[1]}^{[2]}			
Marine Landaise^{[1]}^{[2]}			
Maine-Anjou – see Rouge des Prés			
Mirandaise^{[1]}^{[2]}			
Montbéliarde^{[1]}^{[2]}			
Nantaise^{[1]}^{[2]}			
Normande^{[1]}^{[2]}			
Parthenaise^{[1]}^{[2]}			
Pie Rouge des Plaines^{[1]}^{[2]}			
Raço di Biòu^{[1]}^{[2]}; Race Camarguaise	Camargue		
Rouge des Prés^{[1]}^{[2]} or Maine-Anjou			
Rouge des Prés Lait^{[1]}			
Rouge Flamande^{[1]}^{[2]}			
Salers^{[1]}^{[2]}			
Salers Lait^{[1]}^{[2]}			
Saônoise^{[1]}^{[2]}			
Tarentaise^{[1]}^{[2]}			
Villard De Lans^{[1]}^{[2]}			
Vosgienne^{[1]}^{[2]}			

=== Imported breeds ===
- Aurochs reconstitué^{[1]}^{[2]}
- Blanc-Bleu or Belgian Blue^{[1]}^{[2]}
- Brahman^{[1]}^{[2]}
- Canadienne^{[1]}^{[2]}
- De Combat^{[1]}^{[2]}
- Hereford^{[1]}^{[2]}
- Hérens^{[1]}^{[2]}
- Jersiaise or Jersey^{[1]}^{[2]}
- Prim' Holstein or Holstein^{[1]}^{[2]}
- Simmental Française or Pie Rouge de l'Est^{[1]}^{[2]}
