= Corsican cattle =

Breed of cattle

The Corse or Corsicana is a French breed of cattle indigenous to the island of Corsica.

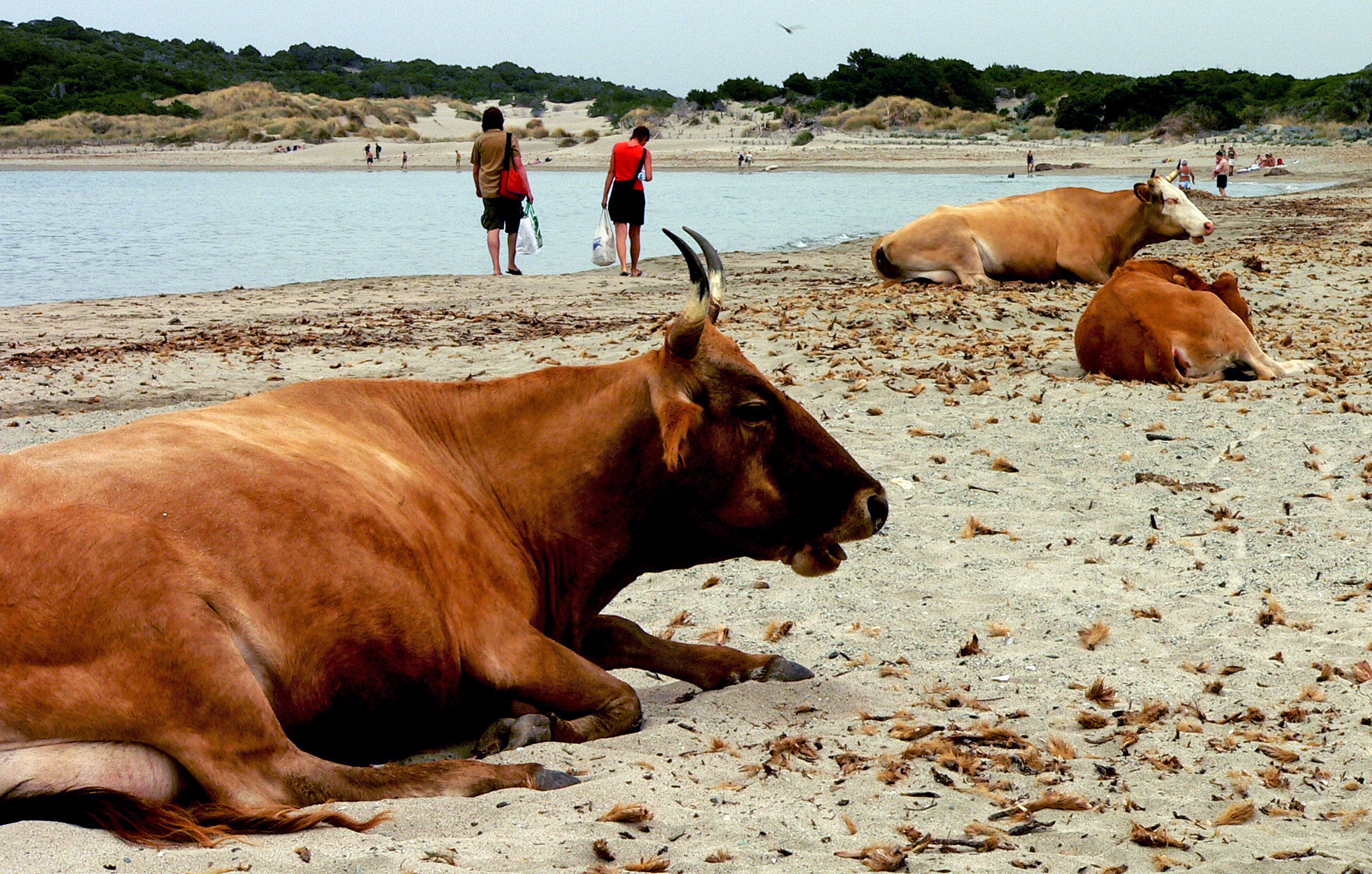
Corsican cows at the beach

== History ==
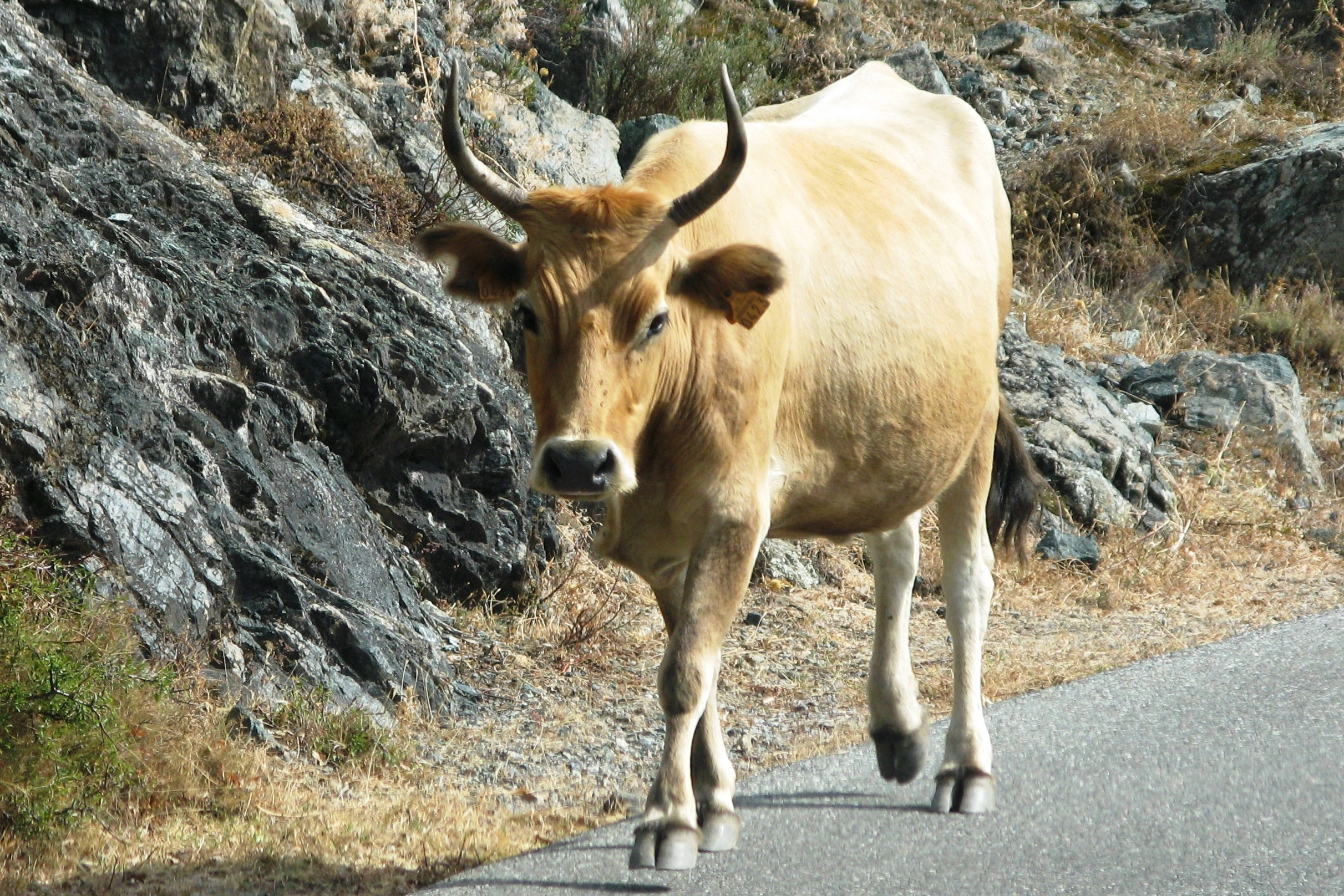
Corsican cow

The Corse is the traditional cattle breed of Corsica, formerly kept principally for draught work in agriculture. It is officially recognised by the Ministère de l'Agriculture et de l'Alimentation, the French ministry of agriculture, but no herd-book is kept.

Since the 1960s there has been intromission of several breeds from mainland France, among them the Aubrac, the Brune des Alpes, the Charolaise, the Gasconne, the Limousine and the Tarentaise. On low-lying pasture where there is abundant forage, cross-bred calves put on weight more rapidly than purebred indigenous stock; they are not suitable for rearing on the thinner grazing of mountainous areas, to which the Corse is well adapted. This cross-breeding has threatened the survival of the original Corse breed, which may now require conservation.

In 2001 there were 28,000 cows and 1,300 bulls for natural and 6 for artificial insemination. The numbers are stable and 60% of females reproduce purebred.

== Morphology ==
The breed has a tan coat with shades ranging from blond to dark wheat and gray. The belly is often lighter. The mucous membranes are dark. The lyre-shaped horns are brought up. The breed is of small size and low weight. Cows measures 1.15 m (3 ft 9 in) and 280 kg (620 lb), the bulls 1.20 m (3 ft 11 in) and 350 kg (770 lb).

== Use ==
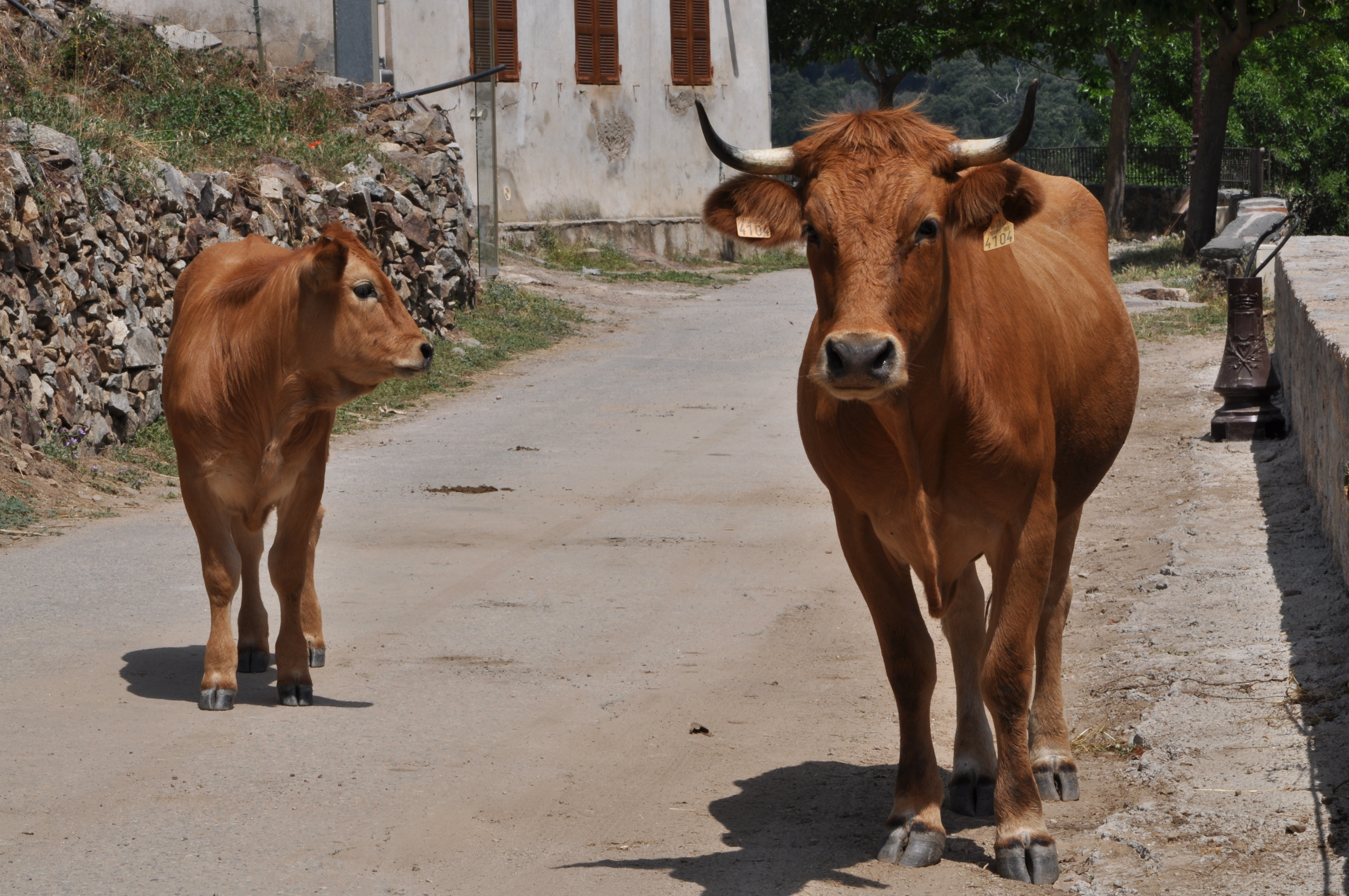
Cows at Mausoleo.

Cattle in Corsica were traditionally used as draught animals in agriculture, particularly in cereal farming; cows gave a small quantity of milk, and oxen no longer fit for work yielded some beef. Following the decline in cereal farming in the island, the cattle are reared mostly for beef, usually from bullocks slaughtered at an age of 10 to 12 months (Corsican: manzu), when they have a live weight of some 140–180 kg. These a managed extensively, grazing freely on the maquis and woodland undergrowth of the mountains.
