= Ferrandaise =

French breed of cattle

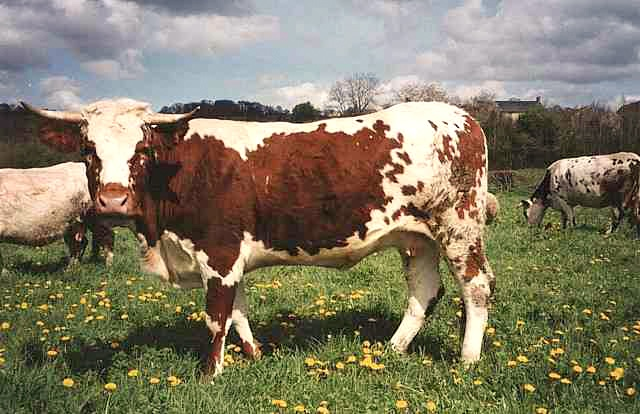

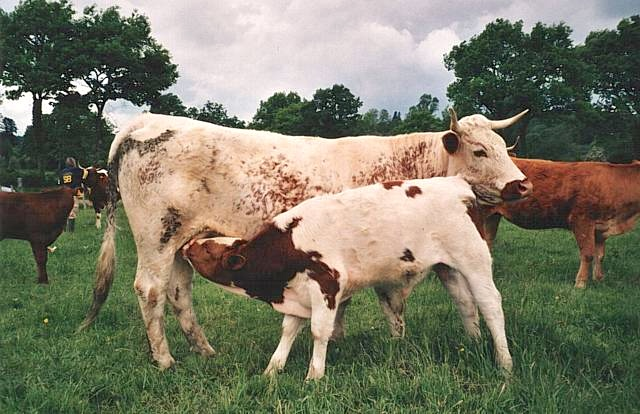
- Conservation status: FAO (2007): endangered-maintained
- Other names: Ferrande; Ferrandine; Pierre-sur-Haute
- Country of origin: France
- Distribution: Massif Central

Traits
- Weight: Male: 900–1100 kg; Female: 650 kg
- Height: Female: 138 cm
- Coat: red pied, sometimes black pied
- Horn status: horned in both sexes
- Cattle; Bos (primigenius) taurus

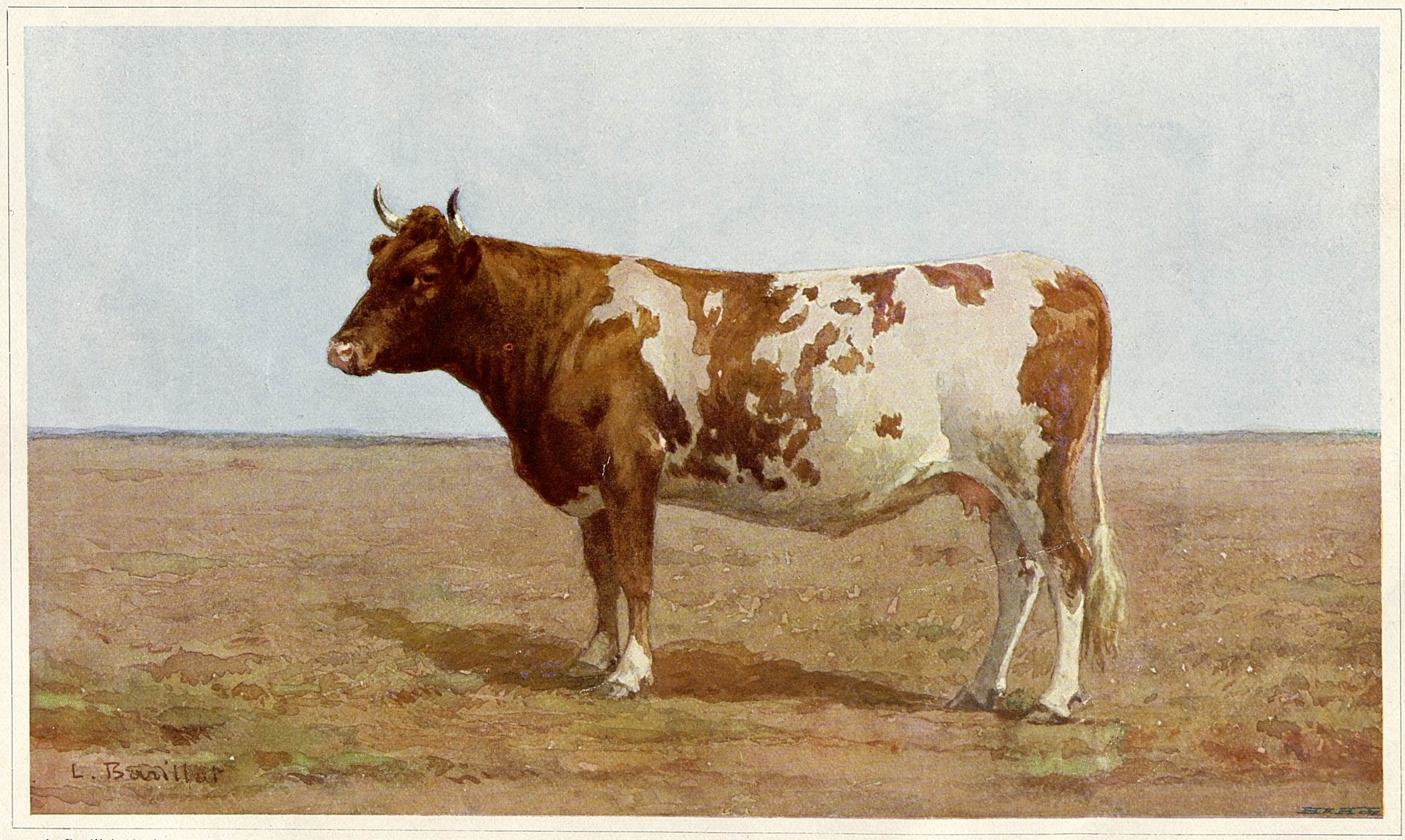
Illustration from 1910

The Ferrandaise (French: [fɛʁɑ̃dɛz]) is an endangered French breed of domestic cattle from the département of Puy-de-Dôme, in the Massif Central of Auvergne, in central France. It is named for the city and commune of Clermont-Ferrand, the capital of Puy-de-Dôme.

== History ==
Although cattle of the Ferrandaise type had long been known in the northern part of the region of Auvergne (now part of Auvergne-Rhône-Alpes), the name "Ferrandaise" only came into use in the second half of the nineteenth century; before that, they were known as the race bigarrée, or roughly 'the mottled breed'. In the later part of the century the variability of the coat of the Ferrandaise was seen as a defect, and from 1899 the only permitted coat colour was pied red-and-white. A herd-book was established six years later, in 1905. The breed was mainly concentrated in two areas – that of Clermont-Ferrand (for which it is named) and that of Ambert, both in the département of Puy-de-Dôme – but its range extended into the Loire and the Haute-Loire to the south and east, and into the Corrèze to the west.

In the first quarter of the twentieth century the Ferrandaise numbered some 200000 head. Numbers fell in the years following the Second World War, both as a result of the increasing mechanisation of agriculture and consequent decreased demand for draught cattle, and because of an official policy of reduction of the number of French minority breeds, introduced in 1960 by Edmond Quittet, the Inspecteur général de l'agriculture. From around 1960 the Ferrandaise was cross-bred to some extent with Montbéliarde and Salers stock. By 1962 the population had fallen to 42000, and fifteen years later, in 1977, fewer than 170 remained. In that year a breeders' association – the Association pour la Sauvegarde de la Race Bovine Ferrandaise – was formed, and with the help of the Institut de l'élevage and the Parc naturel régional des volcans d'Auvergne, a recovery project was launched. By 2001 numbers had increased to some 500 registered females, with frozen semen held from about 26 bulls. The conservation status of the Ferrandaise was listed by the Food and Agriculture Organization of the United Nations as "endangered-maintained" in 2007; in that year there were 1236 cows and about 50 bulls in 186 farms, with about 30 other bulls available for artificial insemination. In 2023 the total population was reported to be 5647 in 306 herds, with 2732 breeding cows and 159 bulls in service.

== Characteristics ==
The Ferrandaise is large, solid and robust. It is docile, long-lived, frugal and resistant, and calves easily. It is well adapted to rough and poor terrain, and in particular to the soil and climatic conditions of the mountains of its native area.

The coat is normally red-and-white, or occasionally black-and-white. Three coat patterns are detailed in the breed standard: barrée, pied, with patches of white on a coloured ground; poudrée, white speckled with colour on the head and flanks; and bregniée, colour-sided. The muzzle and mucosa are pale, the horns lyre-shaped.

== Use ==
The Ferrandaise was traditionally a triple-purpose breed, kept for its milk, for its meat, and for draught work. The milk was formerly much used in regional Auvergnois cheeses such as Bleu de Laqueuille, Fourme d'Ambert, Fourme de Montbrison, Fourme de Rochefort-Montagne and – together with milk from Salers cows – Saint-Nectaire.

The Ferrandaise is now raised as a dual-purpose breed, for milk and meat. Milk production is around 3500 kg or 3800 kg per lactation, with 3.8% fat and 3.2% protein.
