= Vosgienne =

Breed of cattle

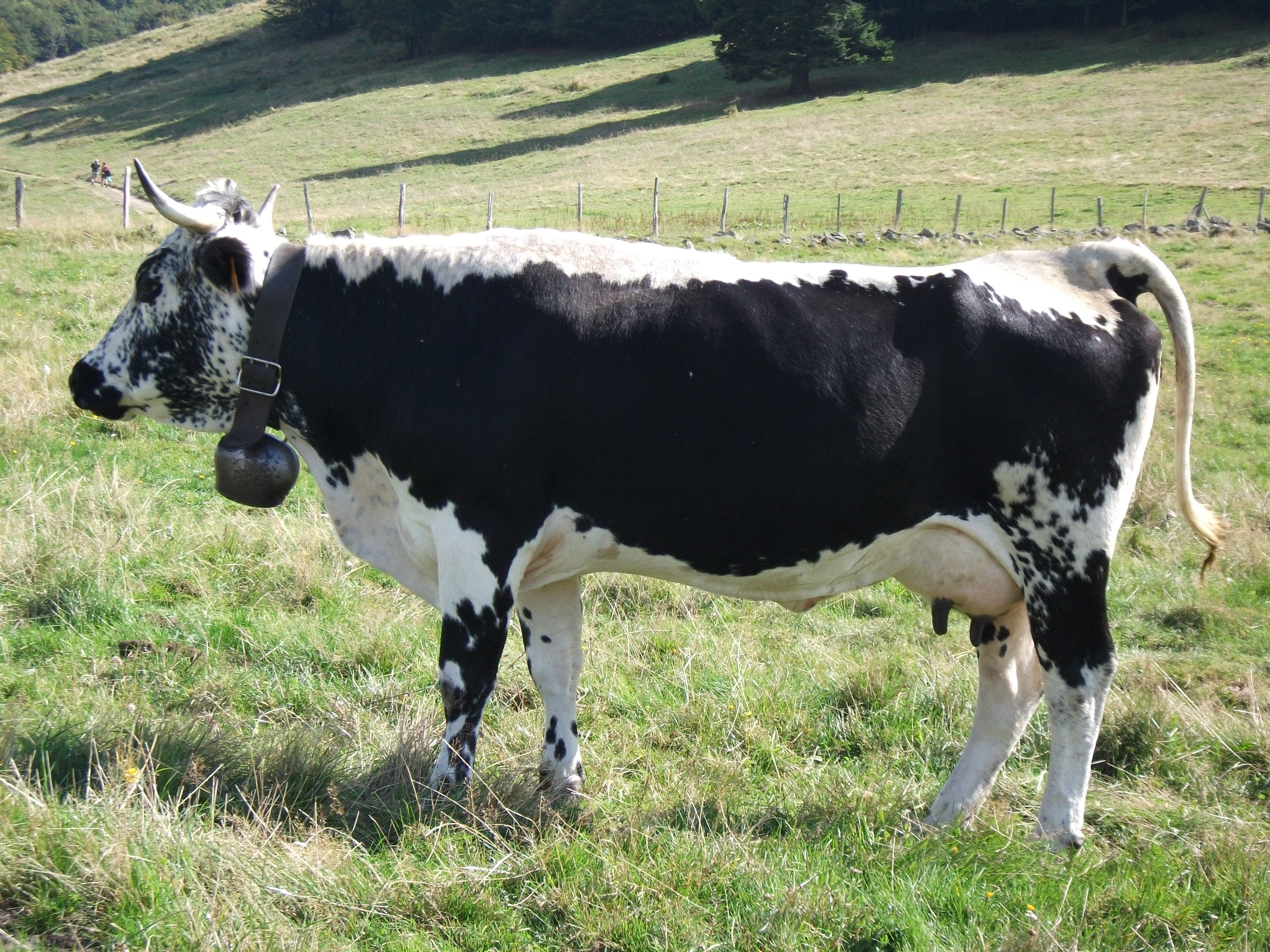
- Cow grazing in the pasture.
- Country of origin: France
- Distribution: Vosges
- Use: mixed
- Skin colour: spotted black or red

The Vosgienne is a French cattle breed of medium size well adapted to mountainous regions, primarily found in the Vosges Mountains.

== Origin ==
According to Alain Raveneau, it originates from cows that arrived in the massif in the 17th century. It is said to have been imported by Swedish soldiers who devastated the Duchy of Lorraine during the Thirty Years' War and crossbred with the local population. It is believed to have found a terrain in the Vosges similar to Scandinavia and naturally adapted to the granite massif and mountainous climate. Philippe J. Dubois, however, considers this origin more of a legend. According to him, the breed comes from a Jura population, close to the Tourache of Franche-Comté, an ancestor of the Montbéliarde. This ancient population would have been crossbred with Brown and Prim'Holstein breeds. Photos from the late 19th century to the 1960s show animals that were almost entirely black with white heads or piebald, but very few were speckled.

In the past, two types coexisted, selected from different geographical areas: in the Bruche valley, cows were small and slender, and in the Munster region, they were more massive. The first type disappeared before 1980. From 1971, an introduction of Telemark bull semen took place in 12% of the population.

== Abilities ==
It is a dual-purpose breed, with both productions being valued equally without favoring one over the other. Before the advent of mechanized traction, the Vosgienne breed was also used as a draught animal. Its well-balanced milk, rich in useful substances, is highly valued for AOC Munster cheese. While heifers may lack a bit of precocity, this drawback is offset by very good longevity.

== In popular culture ==
The Vosgienne breed, represented by the cow Candy, is the official mascot of the 2011 International Agricultural Show in Paris.

== See also ==
- List of cattle breeds
