= Froment du Léon =

Breed of cattle

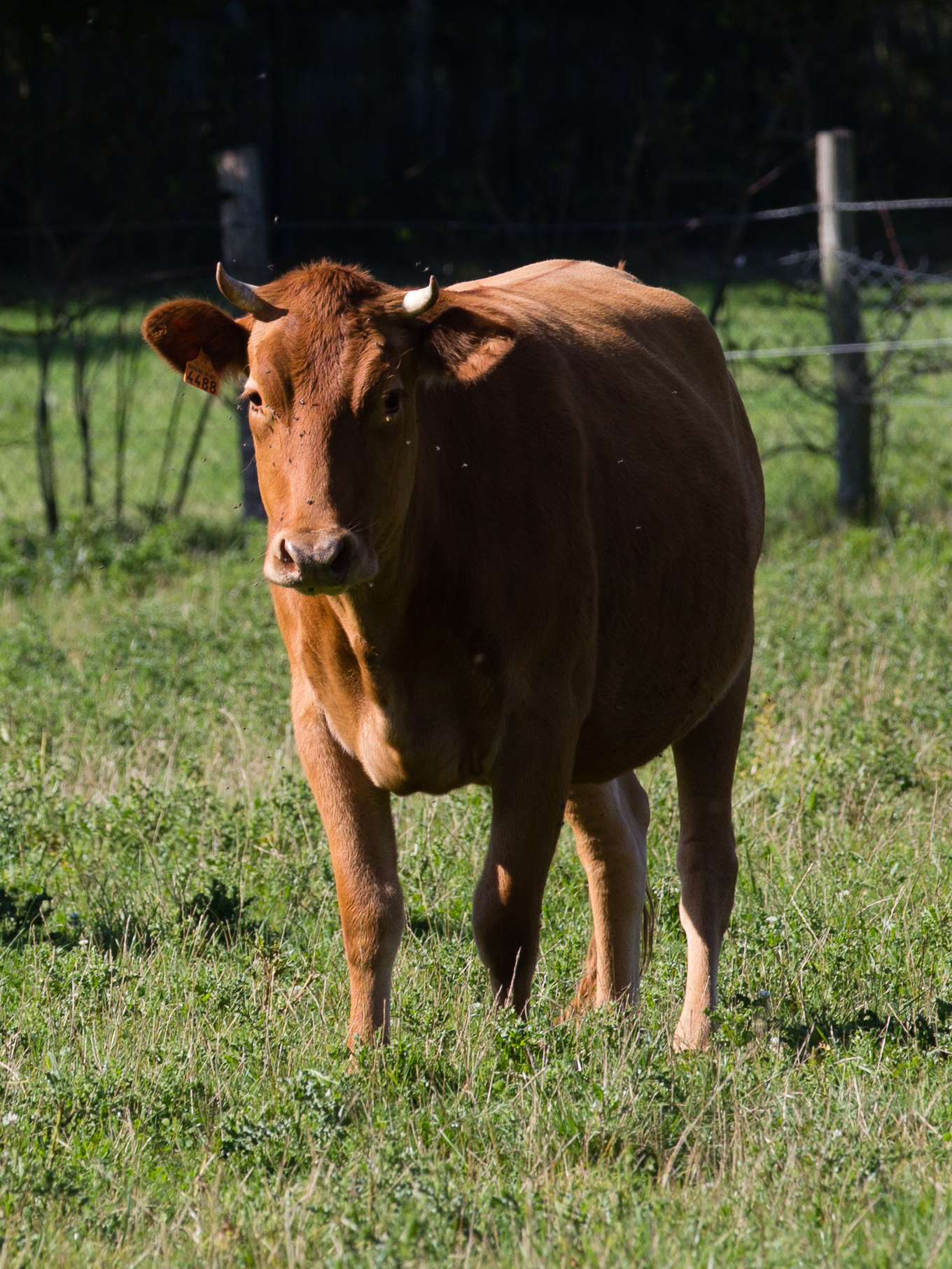
- Cow at the Écomusée du Pays de Rennes
- Conservation status: FAO (2007): endangered-maintained
- Country of origin: France
- Distribution: northern Brittany
- Use: milk

Traits
- Weight: Male: 600–800 kg; Female: 500 kg
- Height: Female: 130 cm
- Coat: wheaten, sometimes with white patches
- Horn status: horned in both sexes
- Cattle; Bos (primigenius) taurus

The Froment du Léon is an endangered French breed of dairy cattle from the coastal region of northern Brittany, in the north-west of France. It is named for the historic Viscounty of Léon, in the départements of Côtes-d'Armor and Finistère in the extreme north-west of Brittany. It is valued for the quality of its milk, which is yellow and high in fat, and is particularly suitable for making into butter.

== History ==
In the early years of the twentieth century there were some 35 000 Froment du Léon cattle. A herd-book was opened in 1907. Froment du Léon cows participated in the Concours Général Agricole de Paris between 1914 and 1939. In 1950 the breed population was about 25 000, but fell rapidly thereafter due to competition from other dairy breeds, first the Normande and later the Friesian. In 1968 there were only 2500 head, and by 1977 no more than 50 cows remained. From about 1960 there was some limited cross-breeding with Guernsey stock from the United Kingdom and from Canada.

A new breed society, the Syndicat d'Éleveurs Froment du Léon, was formed in 1981, and a recovery and conservation project was launched following the discovery in 1978 of a small number of surviving animals in the historic Goëlo region of the Côtes-d'Armor. The Froment du Léon was listed by the FAO as "endangered-maintained" in 2007. By 2010 there were 276 cows in 97 farms. In 2014 the total population was reported to be 314.

== Characteristics ==
The coat of the Froment du Léon is wheat-coloured; there may be some white markings. The muzzle and mucosa are pale. Cows weigh about 500 kg and stand about 130 cm at the withers.

== Use ==
The Froment du Léon is a dairy breed. Milk production is around 3500 kg in a lactation of 305 days. The milk is rich in beta-carotene, which gives it a yellow colour. It has a high fat content, almost 5.5%, which makes it particularly suitable for butter-making.
