= Maine-Anjou =

Breed of cattle

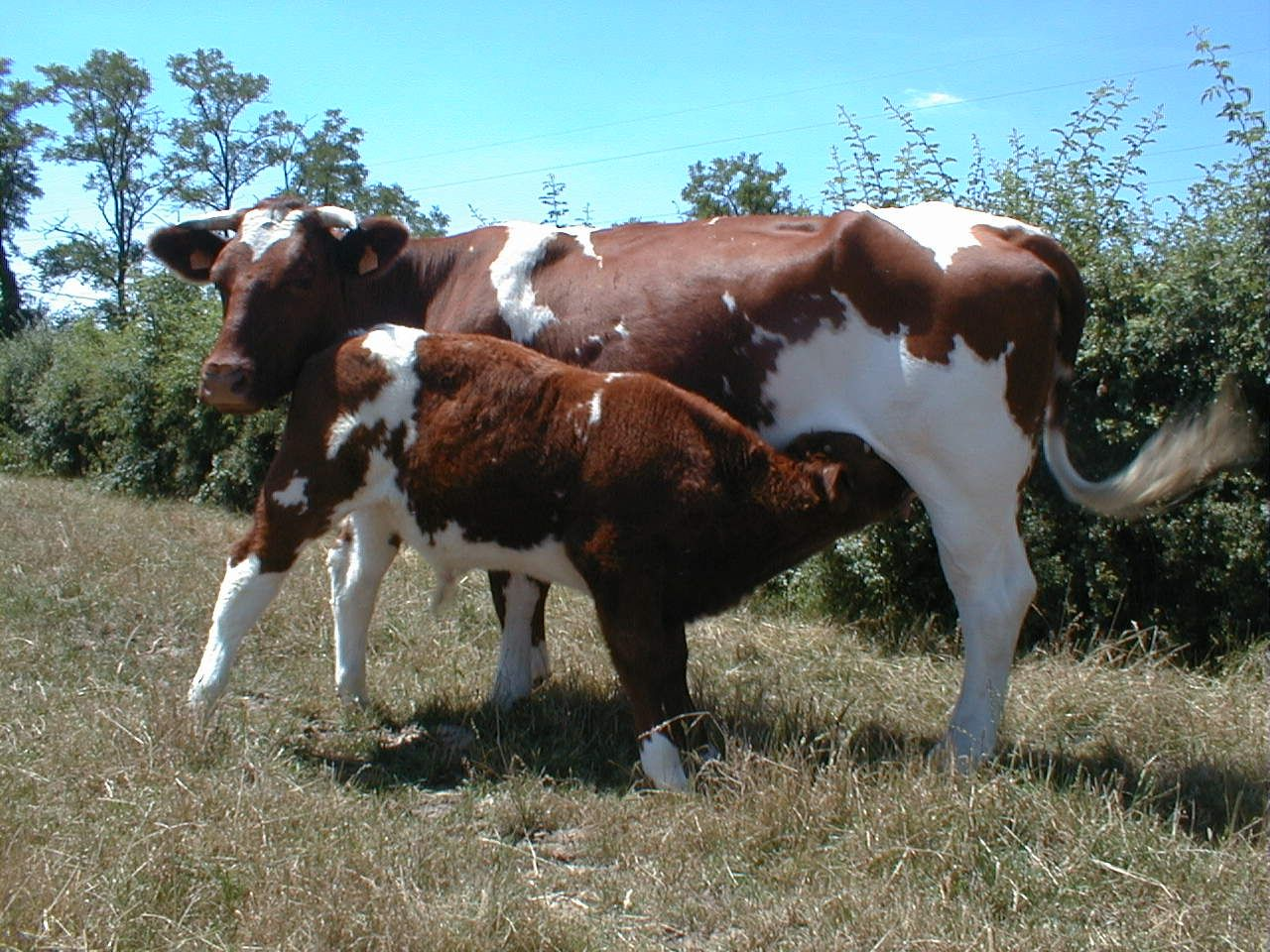
- Cow and calf
- Conservation status: FAO (2007): no concern
- Other names: Rouge des Prés; Durham-Mancelle
- Country of origin: France
- Distribution: Pays de la Loire; Basse-Normandie; Poitou-Charentes
- Use: formerly dual-purpose, now mainly for beef

Traits
- Weight: Male: 1000–1500 kg; Female: 850–1000 kg
- Height: Male: average 170 cm; Female: average 140 cm
- Coat: red pied
- Horn status: horned in both sexes
- Cattle; Bos (primigenius) taurus

The Maine-Anjou is a French breed of domestic cattle, raised mainly in the Pays de la Loire region in north-western France. It was created in the nineteenth century in the historic province of Maine by cross-breeding the local Mancelle dairy cattle with Durham stock from Britain, and was at first called the Durham-Mancelle. In France it has been known since 2004 as the Rouge des Prés, but the Maine-Anjou name continues to be used elsewhere. It was formerly a dual-purpose animal, raised both for meat and for milk, but is now principally a beef breed.

== History ==
The Maine-Anjou breed was created in the nineteenth century by owners of large estates in the traditional province of Maine, who cross-bred the local Mancelle dairy cattle with British Durham cattle – the breed that would later become the Shorthorn. The resulting dual-purpose breed was thus originally known as the Durham-Mancelle. A herd-book was started in 1908, and the name of the breed was changed to Maine-Anjou. It was changed again in 2004, to Rouge des Prés, but outside France the older name continues to be used. From about 1970, breeding favoured beef production over dairy use. The Maine-Anjou may display the genetic myostatin deficiency which produces "double muscling", but has not been selectively bred for this attribute.

The Maine-Anjou is reported from eight countries in the world, with an estimated total population of about 60000, of which approximately two thirds are in France. Of these, some 90% are in the Pays de la Loire, and most of the remainder in the neighbouring Basse-Normandie and Poitou-Charentes regions. About one third of the world population is in the United States, where registrations began in 1969.

== Use ==
The Maine-Anjou was created as a dual-purpose breed, for both beef and milk. Since about 1970 it has been raised predominantly for beef. Maine-Anjou beef from Rouge des Prés cattle raised in the départements of the Deux-Sèvres, the Ille-et-Vilaine, the Loire-Atlantique, the Maine-et-Loire, the Mayenne, the Orne, the Sarthe and the Vendée received Appellation d'Origine Protégée status in 2010.
