= Bleue du Nord =

Breed of cattle

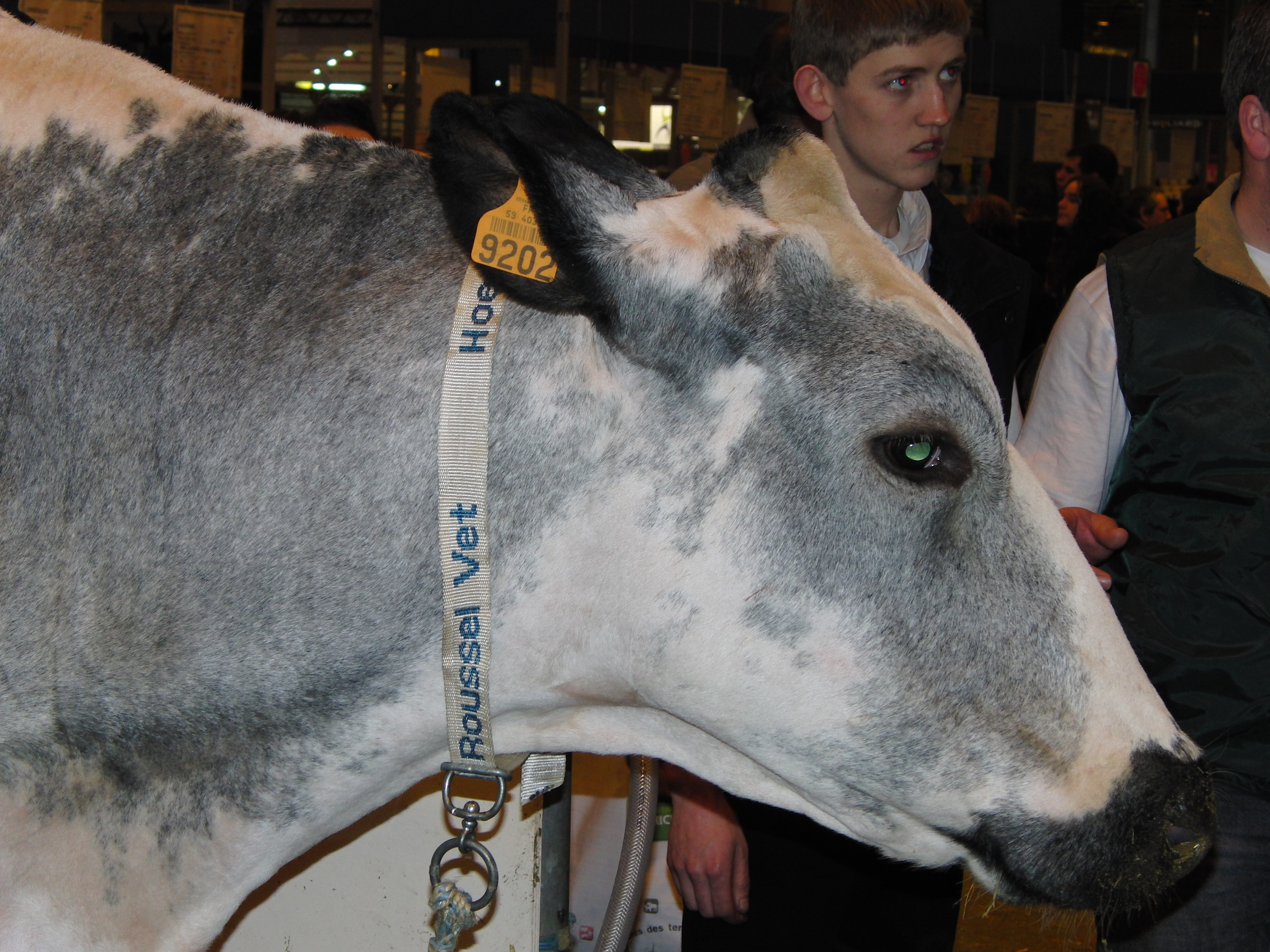
- Cow at the Salon de l'Agriculture, Paris 2010
- Conservation status: FAO (2007): endangered-maintained; DAD-IS (2022): at risk
- Country of origin: France
- Distribution: Nord-Pas-de-Calais

Traits
- Weight: Male: average 1150 kg; Female: average 700 kg
- Height: Male: average 142 cm; Female: average 135 cm
- Coat: white, black pied, blue roan pied
- Horn status: horned in both sexes
- Cattle; Bos (primigenius) taurus

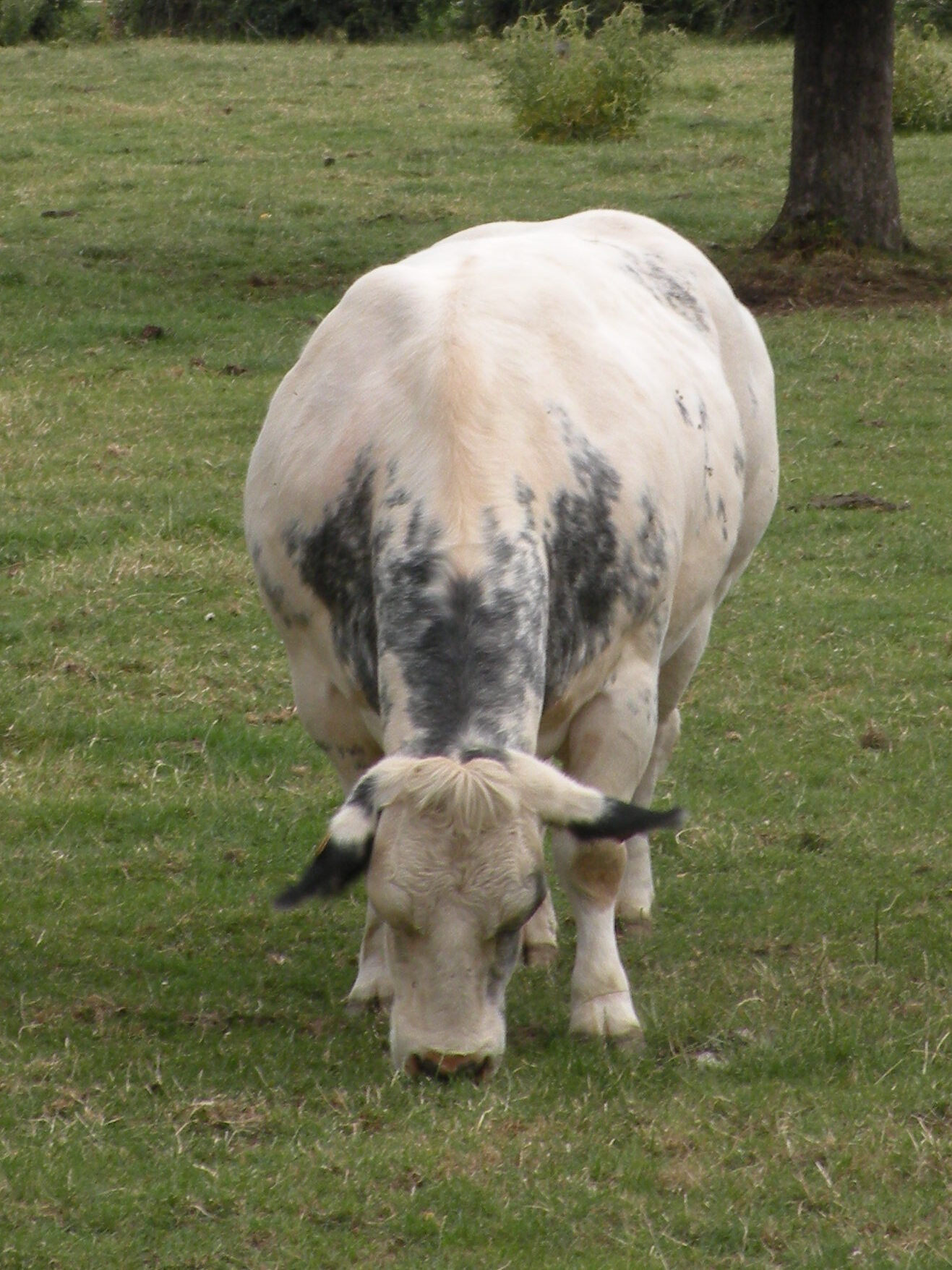
Cow at pasture

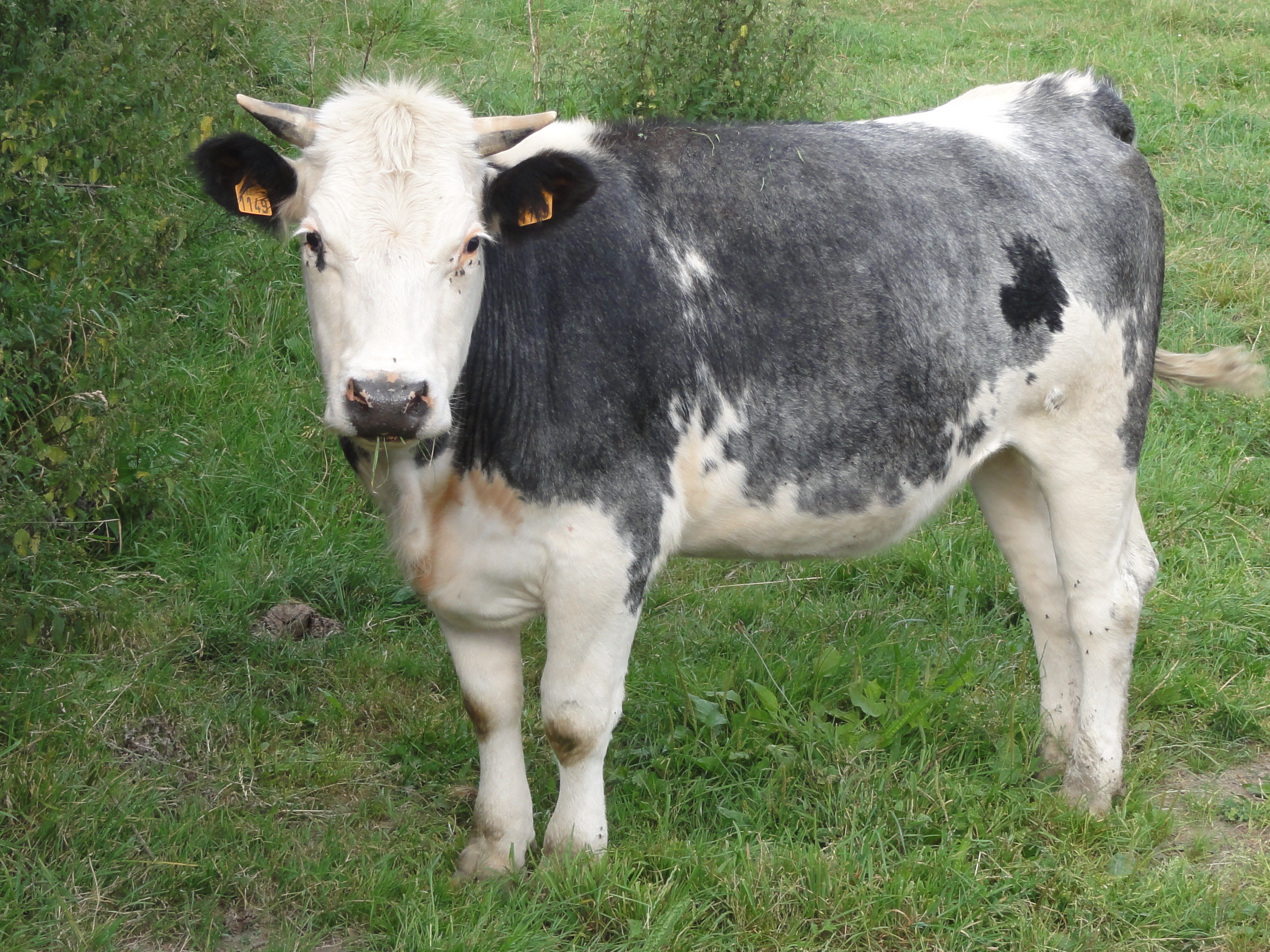
Heifer calf near Solre-le-Château in the Avesnois

The Bleue du Nord (Picard: Bleuse du Nord) is a French breed of dual-purpose cattle from the former region of Nord-Pas-de-Calais in the north-east of the country, on the border with Belgium. It shares the origins of the Belgian Blue, but unlike that breed is selectively bred both for meat and for dairy use. The double-muscling characteristic of the Belgian Blue, caused by a genetic myostatin deficiency, is present also in the Bleue du Nord, but to a limited and controlled extent.

== History ==
Like many European breeds, the Bleue du Nord derives from cross-breeding of local dairy stock with animals of the Durham breed – what would later be called the Shorthorn – imported from Britain. From about 1850, in the historic region of Hainaut on the border between France and Belgium, the Durham was crossed with dairy cattle of Dutch Friesian type with the aim of combining the growth rate of the former with the dairy qualities of the latter. Breeding was initially directed towards dairy use. Both the Bleue du Nord and the Belgian Blue descend from this stock.

By the end of the nineteenth century the Bleue du Nord was widespread in the region. Numbers fell drastically during the First World War, and by 1930 there were no more than 50000 head. After the Second World War, the policy of Edmond Quittet, the Inspecteur général de l'agriculture, was to reduce the diversity of French breeds. The herd-book of the Bleue du Nord was closed in 1953.

From about 1960, breeding of the Belgian Blue – known in France as the Blanc-Bleu – concentrated heavily on beef production and on the "double-muscling" characteristic. A small number of French breeders continued to raise the older dual-purpose type. A new herd-book for the Bleue du Nord was opened in 1986 or 1998.

In 2007 the conservation status of the Bleue du Nord was listed by the FAO as 'endangered-maintained'. In 2020 the total population was reported as 3321, with registered breeding stock consisting of 1231 cows and 41 bulls. It is distributed mainly in the cantons of Avesnes-sur-Helpe, Bavay, Le Quesnoy, Maubeuge and Valenciennes in the former region of Nord-Pas-de-Calais – now part of Hauts-de-France – in the north-east of the country, on the border with Belgium.

In 2008 an international project of co-operation began to co-ordinate exchange of breeding stock between the Bleue du Nord of France and the closely similar Bleu Mixte of Belgium – the surviving remnant of dual-purpose Belgian Blue.

== Characteristics ==
The Bleue du Nord may be black-and-white pied, blue-and-white pied, or white. The muzzle and mucous areas are dark. The horns are white at the base, black at the tips.

The cattle are docile and easily managed. They are frugal, robust and resistant, and well adapted to the cold and damp conditions of their native area.

The Mf gene, which causes the myostatin deficiency that results in the "double-muscling" or "culard" characteristic typical of the Belgian Blue breed, is present in some 10–20% of the breeding population of the Bleue du Nord. To maintain genetic diversity, a number of bulls not homozygous for the Mf gene are selected each year as donors for artificial insemination.

== Use ==
The Bleue du Nord has been selectively bred to maintain both its abilities as a dairy breed and its qualities as a beef breed.

Milk yield is lower than in specialised dairy breeds. It is variously reported as 4853 kg in 292 days; as 5350 litres in a standard lactation of 300 days; and as 6108 litres. The record for the breed is 10795 kg in one lactation.

The meat is tender and low in fat.
