= Bazadaise =

French breed of cattle

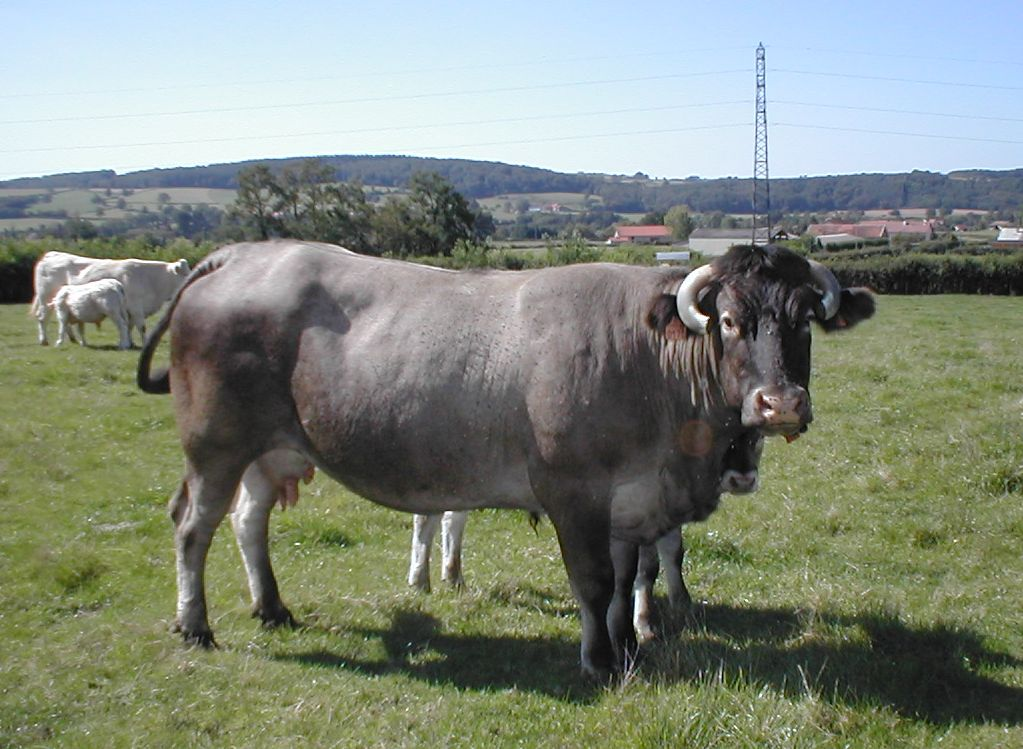
- Conservation status: FAO (2007): not at risk
- Other names: Bazadais; Grise de Bazas
- Country of origin: France
- Distribution: Aquitaine, Midi-Pyrénées

Traits
- Weight: Male: average 1000 kg; Female: average 750 kg
- Height: Male: average 145 cm; Female: average 140 cm
- Skin colour: black
- Coat: grey
- Horn status: horned in both sexes
- Cattle; Bos (primigenius) taurus

The Bazadaise or Grise de Bazas (Gascon: Vasadés) is a French breed of beef cattle. It takes its name from the town of Bazas in the département of the Gironde, in the Nouvelle-Aquitaine region of south-western France, and originates in the low-lying areas to the south of the River Garonne near that town. A festival, the Fête des Boeufs Gras, is held each year in Bazas to present fattened Bazadaise stock.

== History ==
The Bazadaise or Grise de Bazas is a traditional draught breed of the Pyrénées and the Gironde, in the Nouvelle-Aquitaine region of south-western France. It is thought to result from inter-breeding of local cattle of Aquitaine with others of Spanish origin. It is named for the town of Bazas in the Gironde, and is still strongly associated with it: an annual festival, the Fête des Boeufs Gras, is held each year in Bazas to celebrate and present the Bazadaise and its meat, which is heavily marbled and renowned for its tenderness and flavour.

A herd-book for the Bazadaise was established on 31 July 1896. The breed was formerly numerous: there were about 60 000 head in 1940. In the years after the Second World War, the mechanisation of agriculture and more extensive cultivation of cereal crops in the region both contributed to a rapid decline in numbers. By 1970 only 700 cows remained, and efforts to recover and conserve the breed began. In 2013 there were about 3400 cows, in more than 140 farms.

The Bazadaise has been exported to Australia, Chile, Spain and the United Kingdom. Exported stock has been both raised pure-bred, and used for cross-breeding.

== Characteristics ==
The Bazadaise is uni-coloured grey, with some variations due to sex and age. The skin is black, the muzzle and mucous areas pale. The horns are incurved and often down-turned; they are waxy yellow at the base, black at the tips.

== Use ==
The Bazadaise was traditionally a draught breed, used for tasks such as hauling cut wood from the forest. It is now raised for beef. The meat is heavily marbled and is renowned for its tenderness and flavour. It may be marketed under the Label Rouge denominations "Boeuf de Bazas" and "Boeuf de Chalosse". Carcass yield is high; in bullocks, it is some 63–65%.
