= Blonde d'Aquitaine =

French breed of beef cattle

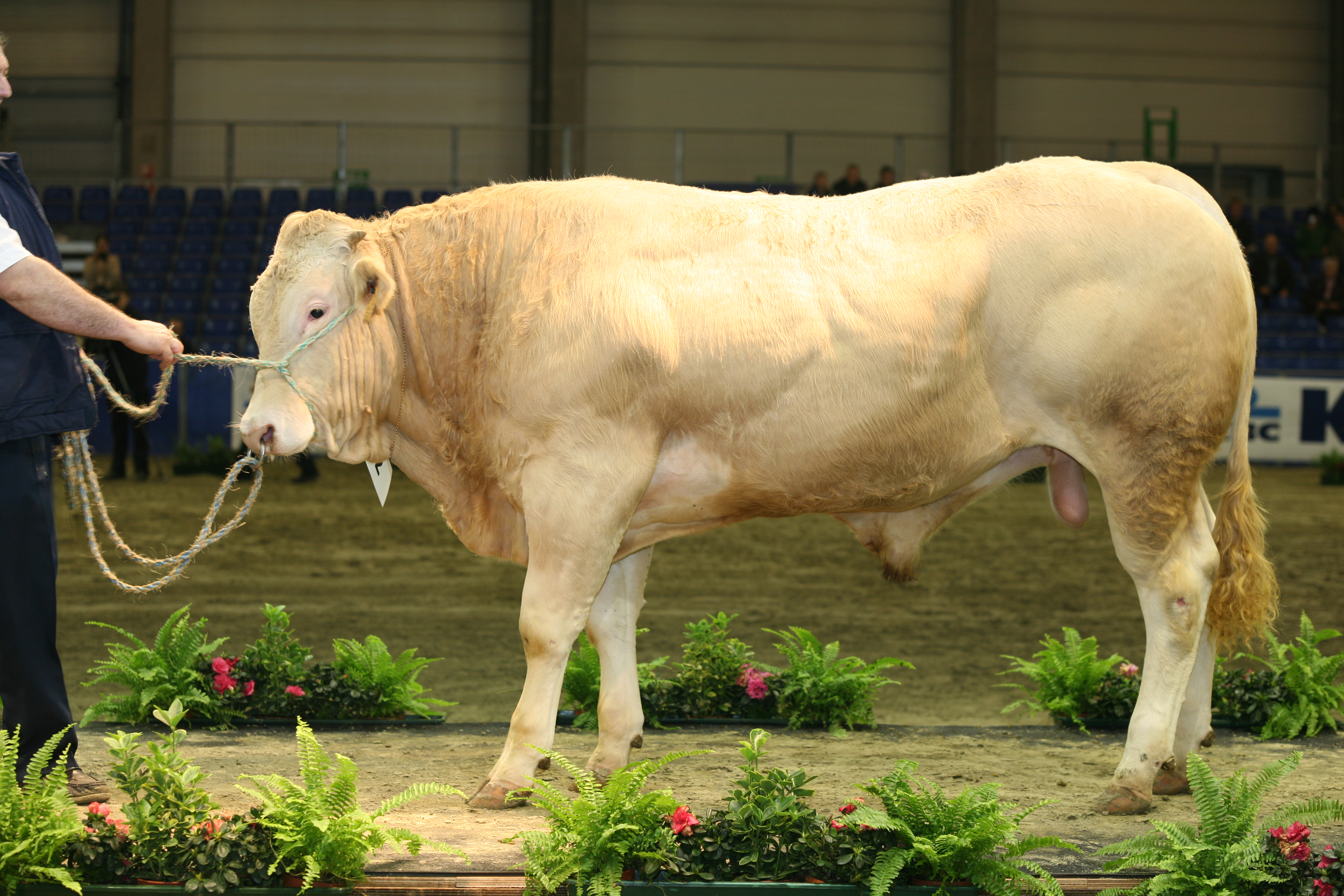
- Bull at Agriflanders in 2007
- Conservation status: FAO (2007): not at risk
- Country of origin: France
- Distribution: worldwide
- Use: meat

Traits
- Weight: Male: 1400 kg; Female: 1050 kg
- Height: Male: 165 cm; Female: 155 cm
- Skin colour: white
- Coat: wheaten
- Horn status: horned in both sexes
- Cattle; Bos (primigenius) taurus

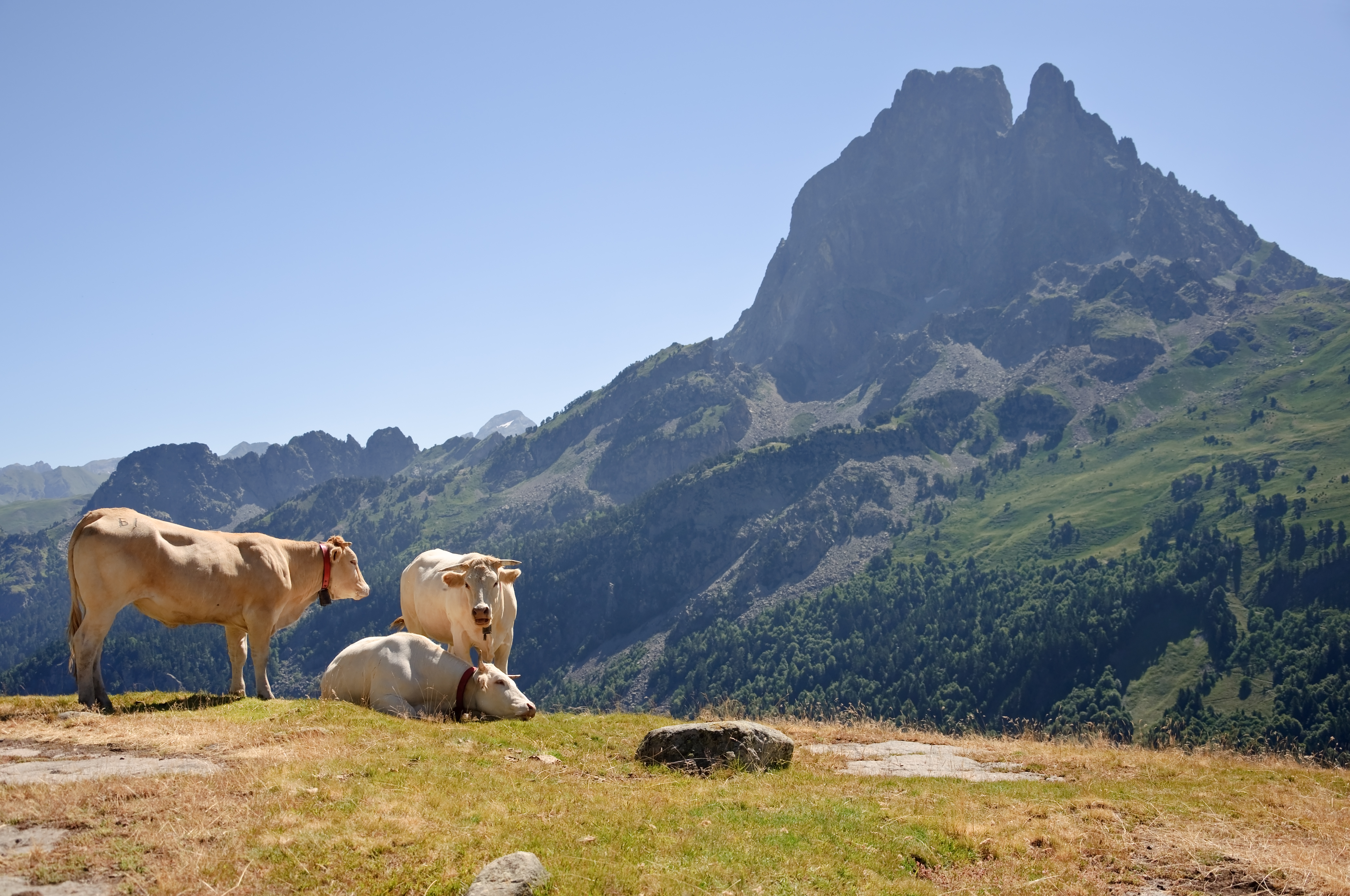
On summer pasture near the Pic du Midi d'Ossau

The Blonde d'Aquitaine is a modern French breed of large domestic beef cattle. It was created in 1962 by merging three blonde draught breeds of south-western France, the Blonde des Pyrénées, the Blonde de Quercy and the Garonnaise. Since about 1970, it has been selectively bred specifically for beef production. It is the third-most numerous beef breed of France, after the Charolais and the Limousin. It has been exported to many countries round the world.

== History ==
The Blonde d'Aquitaine breed was created in 1962 by merging three blonde breeds of south-western France, the Blonde de Quercy, the Garonnaise and the Blonde des Pyrénées. All three were principally draught breeds. The Garonnaise had been numerous in Aquitaine – 400,000 head were recorded in 1880; a herd-book was started in 1898. The Blonde des Pyrénées was itself an amalgam of several other breeds, including the Béarnaise, the Race d'Urt, and the Basquiaise; its herd-book was started in 1920, the same year as that of the Blonde de Quercy.

The Blonde d'Aquitaine includes almost all the traditional blonde cattle breeds of southern France, although remnant populations of a few of them have allowed them to be reconstituted. The moving force behind the creation of the breed was Raphaël Trémouille, a veterinary surgeon and member of the lower chamber of the French parliament. From about 1970, concerted efforts were made to improve the beef production attributes of the breed.

The Blonde d'Aquitaine is the third beef breed of France by numbers, after the Charolais and the Limousin. In 2013 there were about 560000 head in more than 18000 farms. The Blonde d'Aquitaine has been exported to many countries of the world, including all countries of the European Union. In 2024 it was reported by 28 countries, mostly in Europe; 23 of them also reported population data. Outside France, where the total population was reported at over 1 million head, populations of over 10000 head were reported by Brazil and the Netherlands.

It is much used for cross-breeding in Oceania and in Eastern Europe, and has shown particular promise when crossed with zebuine cattle breeds in South America.

== Characteristics ==
The Blonde d'Aquitaine is wheat- or cream-coloured, varying from a dark to very light fawn; the surround of the eyes and the area round the muzzle is paler. The skin is white, and the muzzle and mucous areas pale.

== Use ==
The Blonde d'Aquitaine is raised exclusively for beef, whether purebred or cross-bred. Bullocks reach almost 300 kg at 210 days (7 months), and about 500 kg at 15 months. Carcass yield is about 65%.
