= Béarnaise cattle =

French breed of cattle

Béarnaise
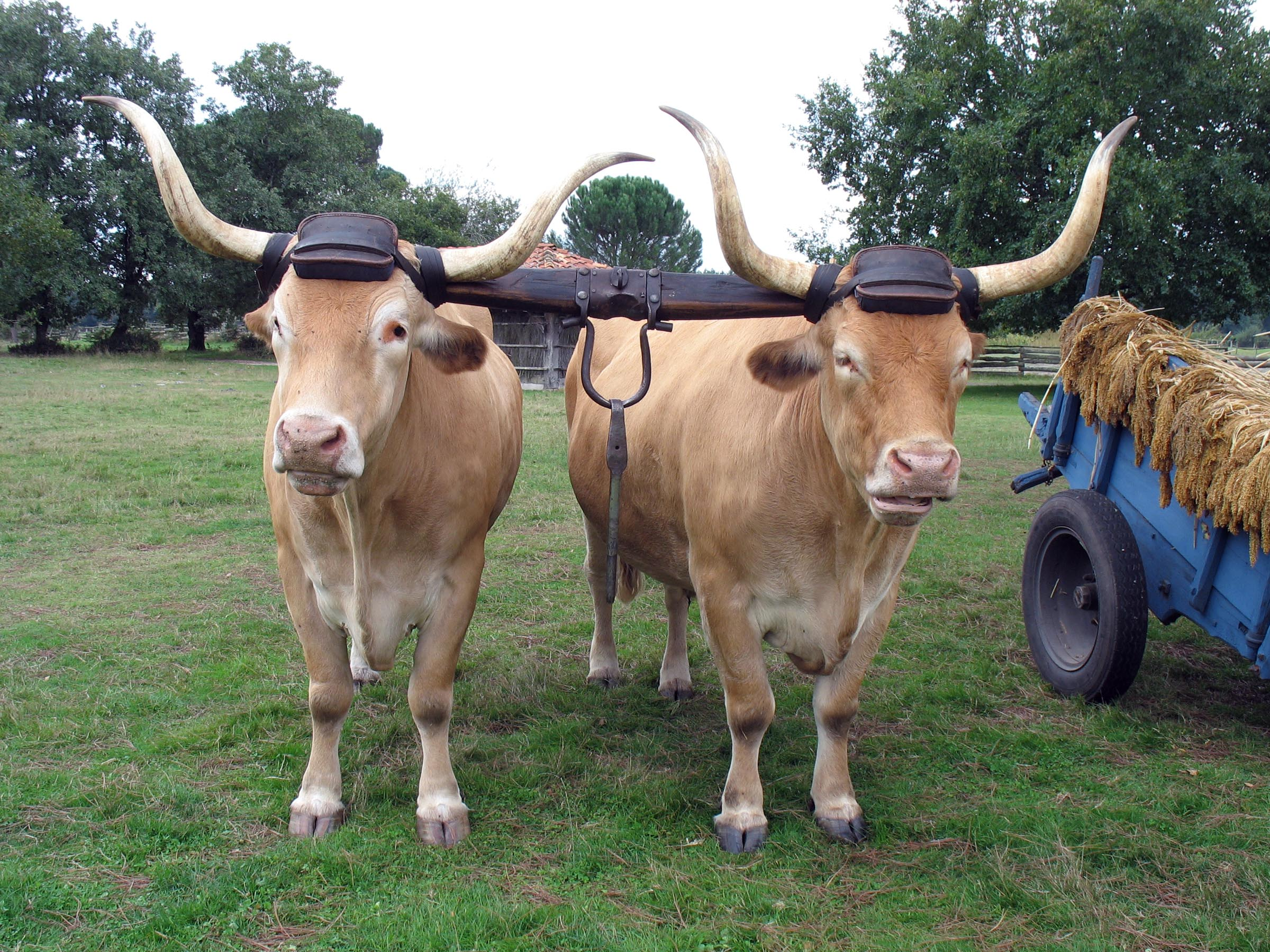
- Yoked pair of oxen at the Écomusée de la Grande Lande at Marquèze
- Conservation status: FAO (2007): critical-maintained; DAD-IS (2025): at risk/endangered
- Other names: Blonde des Pyrénées; Basco-Béarnaise; Basque: Bearnotar behia; Spanish: Rubia de los Pirineos
- Country of origin: France
- Distribution: Aquitaine
- Use: meat

Traits
- Weight: Male: 900 kg; Female: 600 kg
- Height: Female: 135 cm
- Skin colour: unpigmented
- Coat: wheaten
- Horn status: horned in both sexes
- Cattle; Bos (primigenius) taurus

The Béarnaise is a French breed of domestic beef cattle. It originates in the area of the traditional province of Béarn, in the east of the département of Pyrénées-Atlantiques, in the northern Pyrénées in south-west France. It was merged with other breeds in 1920 to form the Blonde des Pyrénées, which in turn was fused with the Blonde de Quercy and Garonnaise breeds to create the Blonde d'Aquitaine in 1962.

== History ==
The Béarnaise originated in the area of the traditional province of Béarn, in the east of the département of Pyrénées-Atlantiques, in the northern Pyrénées in south-western France. It was a triple-purpose breed, kept for its meat, for its milk, and as a draught animal. A herd-book was established in 1900.

The Béarnaise was merged with several other local blonde breeds, including the extinct Basquiaise and Race d'Urt, to create the Blonde des Pyrénées (Spanish: Rubia de los Pirineos), for which the herd-book was started in 1920. The Blonde des Pyrénées was in turn merged with the Blonde de Quercy and Garonnaise breeds to create the Blonde d'Aquitaine in 1962.

A small number of the original type of the Béarnaise survived in the Vallée d'Aspe, and from these the breed was re-constituted. A new herd-book was begun in 1982, and a breeders' association was formed in 2003.

The conservation status of the Béarnaise was listed by the Food and Agriculture Organization of the United Nations as "critical-maintained" in 2007. In 2010, 56 owners had a total of 223 cows. In 2014 the population was reported at 324 head.

== Characteristics ==
The Béarnaise is wheat-coloured, varying from a dark fawn to white. It is heavily dewlapped, with long lyre-shaped horns. The skin and mucous membranes are pale, the surround of the eye phaeomelanic.

It is well adapted to draught work and to the mountain environment of the Pyrénées.

== Use ==
The Béarnaise was formerly a triple-purpose breed, kept for milk, for meat and for draught work. It was traditionally milked for only about six months; the milk was used to make mixed cows'-milk/sheep's-milk cheeses. Milk production is low, approximately 2000 kg in a lactation of 200 days.
