= Mirandaise =

French breed of cattle

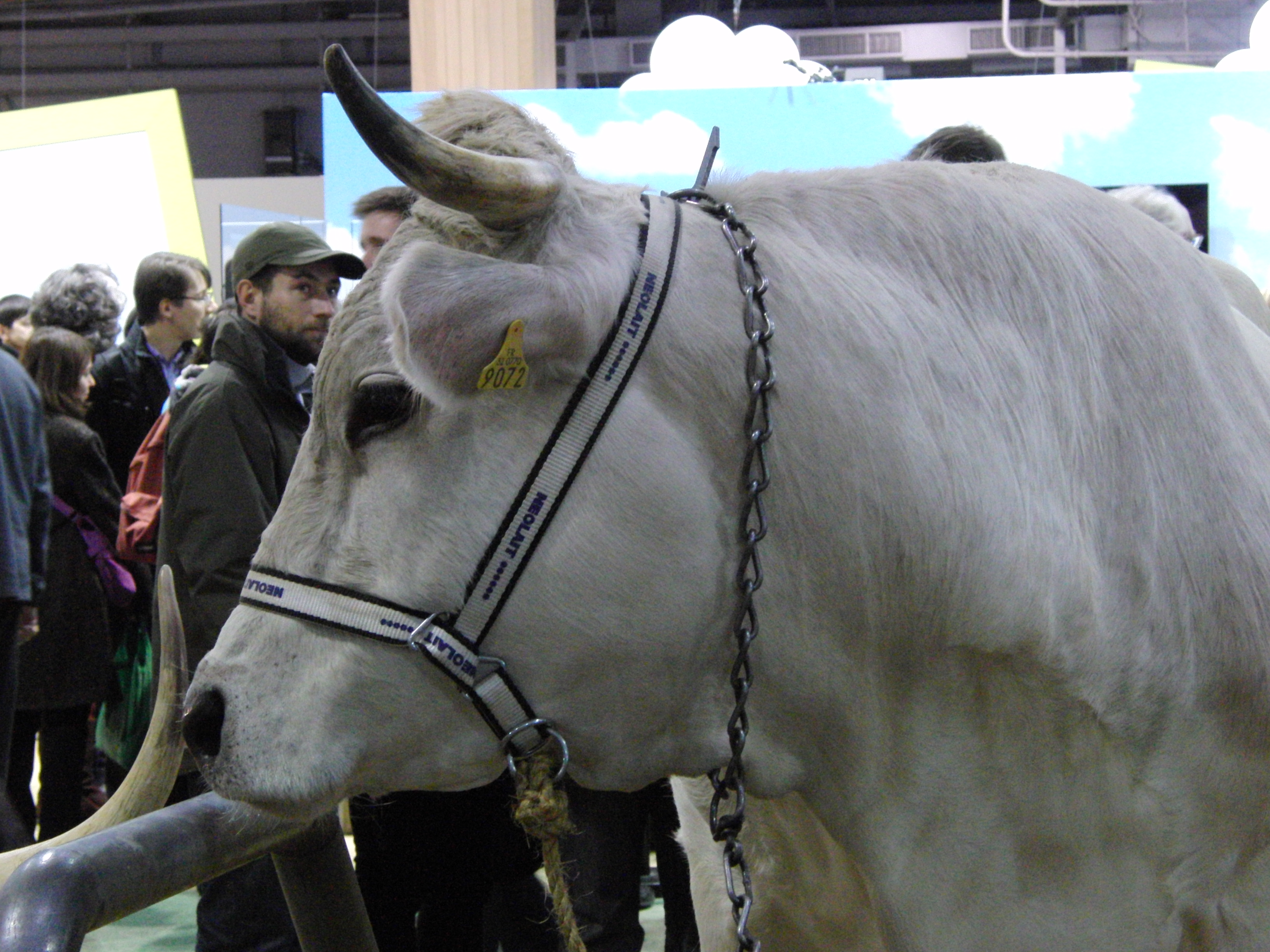
- Conservation status: FAO (2007): endangered-maintained
- Other names: French: Gasconne aréolée; French: Gasconne auréolée
- Country of origin: France
- Distribution: Gers, Occitanie
- Use: formerly draught, now meat

Traits
- Weight: Male: 900 kg; Female: 650 kg
- Height: Male: 150 cm; Female: 138 cm
- Skin colour: brown
- Coat: grey or blonde
- Horn status: horned in both sexes
- Cattle; Bos (primigenius) taurus

The Mirandaise is an endangered French breed of domestic cattle from the département of the Gers, in the historic region of Gascony, now part of the region of Occitanie in south-western France. It is named for the commune of Mirande, in the Gers. The Mirandaise is characterised by an unusual colouration of the areas around the anus and vulva, which are dark in the centre and pale towards the edges. This areola has given the breed its other name, the French: Gasconne aréolée. It is a different breed from the smaller Gasconne, which does not have the same colouration.

== History ==
The origins of the Mirandaise are not known. It was traditionally used as a draught animal in the heavy and difficult soils of the département of the Gers, and is thought to have originated in the area of the Vallée du Gers between Fleurance and Masseube. Its range extended southwards as far as the foothills of the Pyrénées, in the départements of the Haute-Garonne and the Hautes-Pyrénées. A herd-book was established in 1894.

Numbers fell in the years following the Second World War, when the mechanisation of agriculture meant that there was decreased demand for draught cattle. By the late 1970s no more than 150 cows and one bull remained. The Mirandaise was listed by the FAO as "endangered-maintained" in 2007. In 2014 the total population was reported to be 616.

== Characteristics ==
The Mirandaise is large and powerful, and tolerates heat well. It is fertile and long-lived, and fattens easily. It is rustic and well adapted to exploit steep terrain not suitable for arable farming.

The coat is white, sometimes tinged with grey or red. The muzzle, switch and hooves are black, the horns lyre-shaped and pale-coloured with black tips. The Mirandaise is characterised by an unusual colouration of the areas around the anus and vulva, which are dark in the centre and pale towards the edges. This areola is not seen in the Gasconne breed, which also has dark hair on the inside of the ear, while the Mirandaise has a pale inside to the ear. It is also considerably larger than the Gasconne.

== Use ==
The Mirandaise was traditionally a draught breed. Calves considered unsuitable either for draught work or as breeding stock were sold for meat at about three months. The Mirandaise is now raised principally for meat, particularly for naturally-fed milk veal.
