= Aubrac cattle =

Breed of cattle

Aubrac
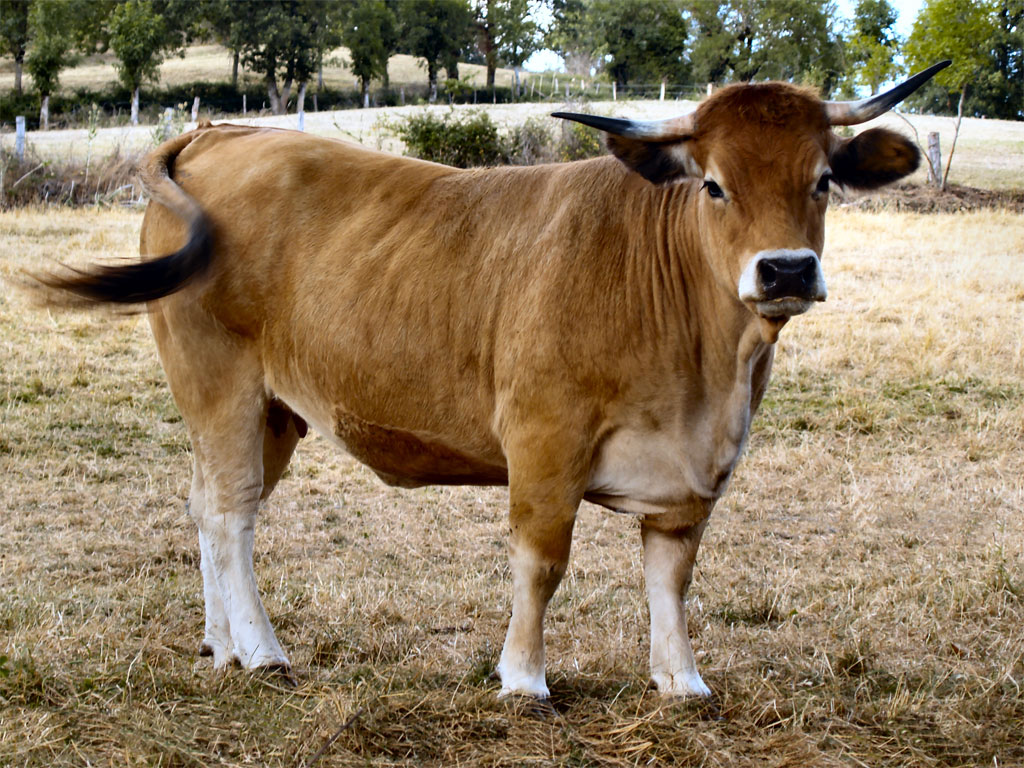
- Aubrac cow
- Conservation status: FAO (2007): not at risk
- Other names: Laguiole
- Country of origin: France
- Distribution: Auvergne, Languedoc-Roussillon, Midi-Pyrénées
- Use: meat

Traits
- Weight: Male: 950 kg; Female: 650 kg
- Height: Male: 140 cm; Female: 129 cm
- Skin colour: black
- Coat: wheaten
- Horn status: horned in both sexes
- Cattle; Bos (primigenius) taurus

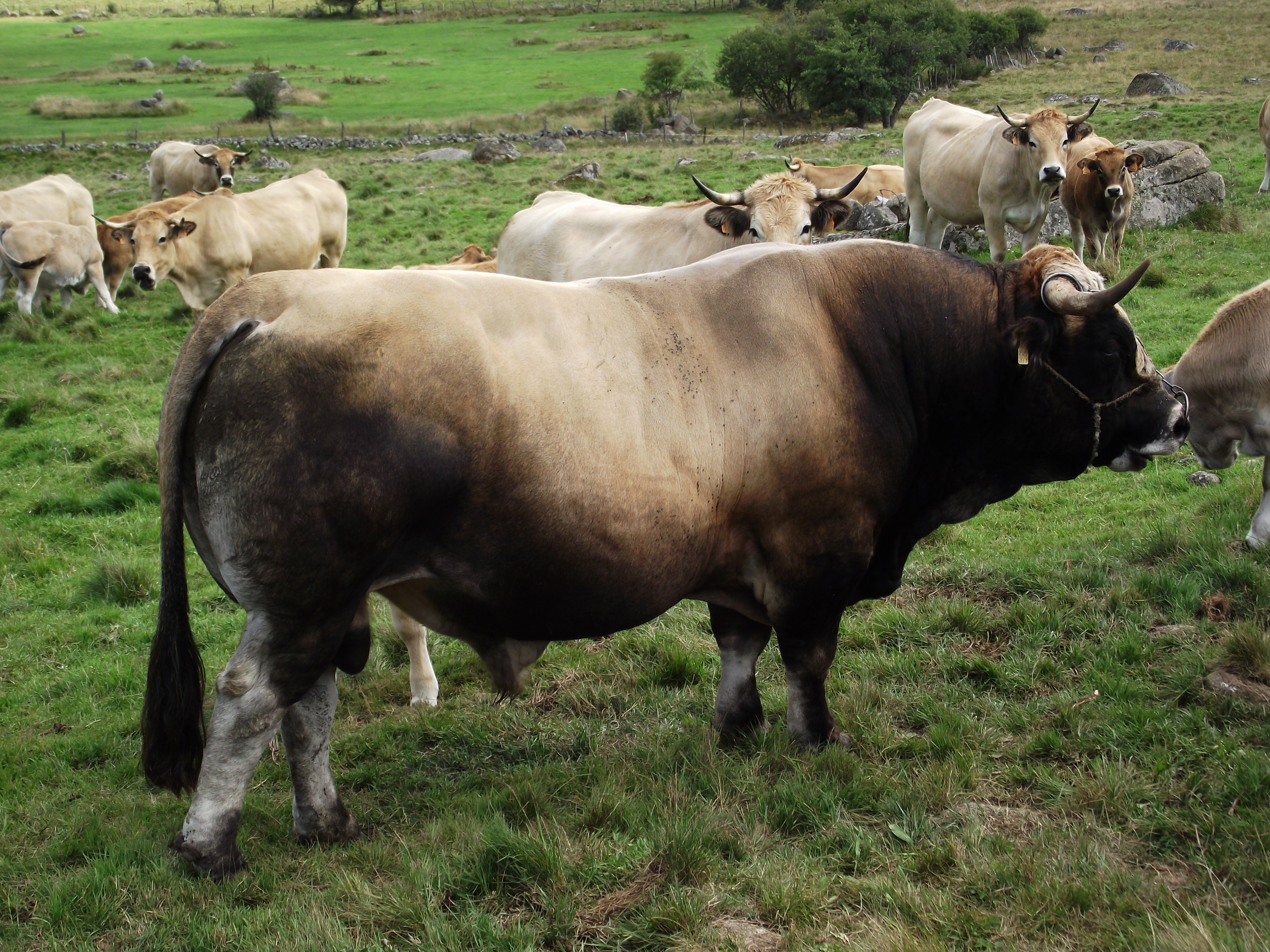
The bull is darker in colour than the cows

The Aubrac or Laguiole is a French breed of beef cattle. It originates on the Plateau de l'Aubrac in the Massif Central in central southern France, from which it also takes its name. It has a wheat-coloured coat and dark hooves, switch, muzzle and eyes.

== History ==
The Aubrac is a traditional breed of the Plateau de l'Aubrac in the Massif Central, which spans the modern départements of the Aveyron, the Cantal and the Lozère, in the regions of Auvergne-Rhône-Alpes and Occitanie. In the twenty-first century almost 90% of the breed population is concentrated in that area. A herd-book was started in 1893.

Some limited cross-breeding took place in the twentieth century: with the Mézenc, now extinct, between 1935 and 1945; with the Maraîchine between 1945 and 1955; and with the Parthenaise between 1955 and 1975.

The conservation status of the Aubrac is 'not at risk'. In 2014 the population in France was reported at about 170000 head; for 2021 it was over 506000. The cattle have been exported to a number of countries in Europe, Asia and the Americas; substantial numbers are reported by Ireland and Lithuania.

== Characteristics ==
The Aubrac is robust, frugal, fertile and long-lived, and is well adapted to the mountain environment of the Massif Central. It is reported to be resistant to trypanosomiasis, the "sleeping-sickness" transmitted by tsetse flies.

It has a uniformly wheaten coat, ranging from a pale greyish white to a light brown tinged with orange-yellow. The skin, hooves, muzzle, tongue, switch and natural openings are all black; there is a pale ring round the muzzle. Bulls may carry darker markings to the coat. The horns are lyre-shaped and tipped with black. Bulls stand about 140 cm at the withers and weigh some 900–1300 kg; cows stand some 125–130 cm and weigh about 600–800 kg.

== Use ==
The Aubrac was formerly reared as a draught and dairy animal, but is now raised principally for beef. Under certain conditions this can be marketed as Fin Gras du Mézenc. Bullocks weigh about 310 kg when weaned.

Some of the cows are of dairy type, and are milked; they will only give milk if their calf is with them. Some of the milk is used in the production of Laguiole cheese; it is hoped that this proportion may reach 10%.
