= Gasconne =

French breed of cattle

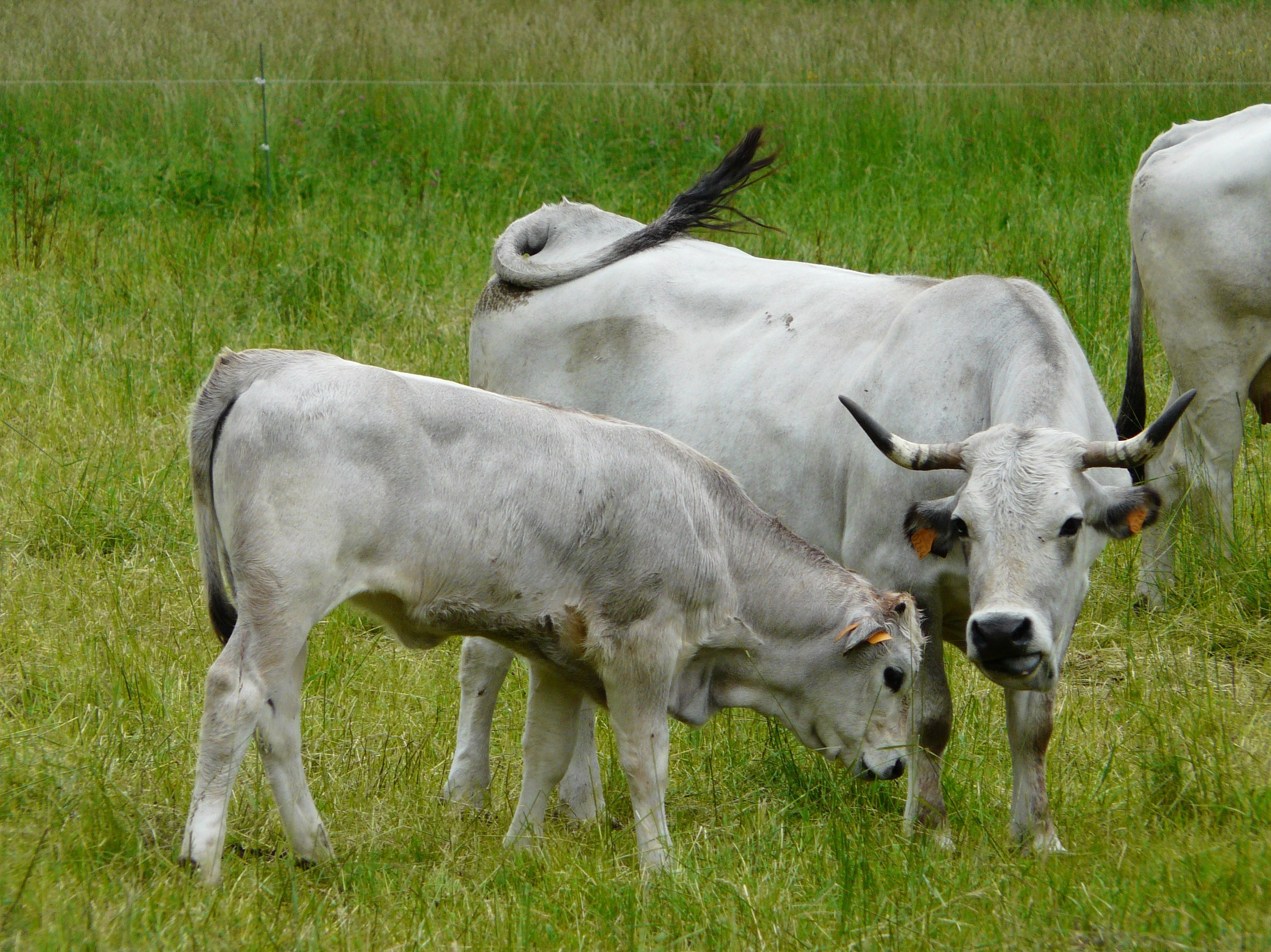
- Cow and calf
- Conservation status: FAO (2007): not at risk; DAD-IS (2024): not at risk
- Other names: Gascon
- Country of origin: France
- Distribution: principally Occitanie
- Use: beef

Traits
- Weight: Male: 1000–1150 kg; Female: 650–750 kg
- Height: Male: average 145 cm; Female: average 135 cm
- Coat: grey
- Cattle; Bos (primigenius) taurus

The Gasconne or Gascon is a French breed of beef cattle. It is named for the historic region of Gascony and is particularly associated with the Haute-Garonne, in the south-east of that region.

Two different types are distinguished, the Gasconne à muqueuses noires and the Gasconne aréolé, these were combined in 1955 into a single herd-book, but separated again in 1999.

== History ==
The Gasconne is named for the historic region of Gascony in south-western France, and is thought to have originated in the area of Saint-Gaudens, in the département of Haute-Garonne in the south-east of that region. It was originally bred in the French Pyrenees, where the harsh climate and limited resources led to the adaptations found in this breed. Because of these adaptations, Gascon cattle can survive and work hard in basically any condition. Because they spend their winters in the low lands and their summers high on the Pyrenees, they are used to huge changes in the climate.

The cattle are found mainly in the former regions of Languedoc-Rousillon and Midi-Pyrenées, now joined to form Occitanie. Some have been exported; small numbers are kept in Canada, in the Czech Republic and in the United Kingdom.

== Characteristics ==
The Gascon have many characteristics that make them different from any other breed of cattle. For example, their hard coat enables the Gascon to tolerate cold weather better than other cows; it is also very thick and sheds water well. The ease of calving is another. Gascon cows have a much shorter labour than other breeds. Another characteristic of the Gascon is that their calves get stronger and gain more weight faster than other types of cows.

Gascon cows have lower feed consumption than other types of cows. This is due to adaptation as their food sources are often scarce. However, they are still able to keep in good condition and become pregnant easily. Gascon cows have a gray coat, but are born red - the coat changes colour at about the fourth month of life. Bulls are grey, with black shading underneath. Average height at the withers is about 145 cm for bulls and 135 cm for cows; body weights are the ranges 1000–1150 kg and 650–750 kg respectively.
