= Tarentaise cattle =

Breed of cattle

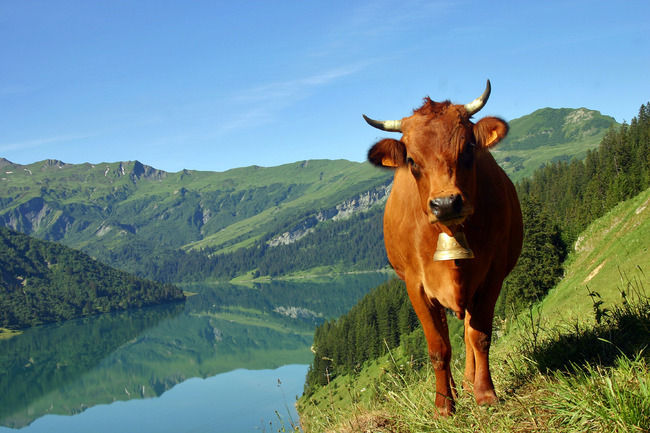
Tarentaise Cow

Tarentaise cattle descend from the domestic cattle of the Tarentaise valley in France where they were isolated from other breeds for many thousands of years. The cattle adapted in such a way as to allow them to exist in high altitudes and be able to range in very steep and rough terrain to forage. They are used in France today to produce the cheese with a distinct flavor that comes from the high alpine villages of the Tarentaise, Beaufortain and Maurienne valley. These cattle have found special niches around the world in commercial cattle grazing and calving. In the USA these cattle are used primarily for producing crossbred cows distinctly suited for tough rangeland conditions and higher elevations. They are also bred for the beauty of their markings and their docile demeanor.
