= Normande =

Breed of cattle

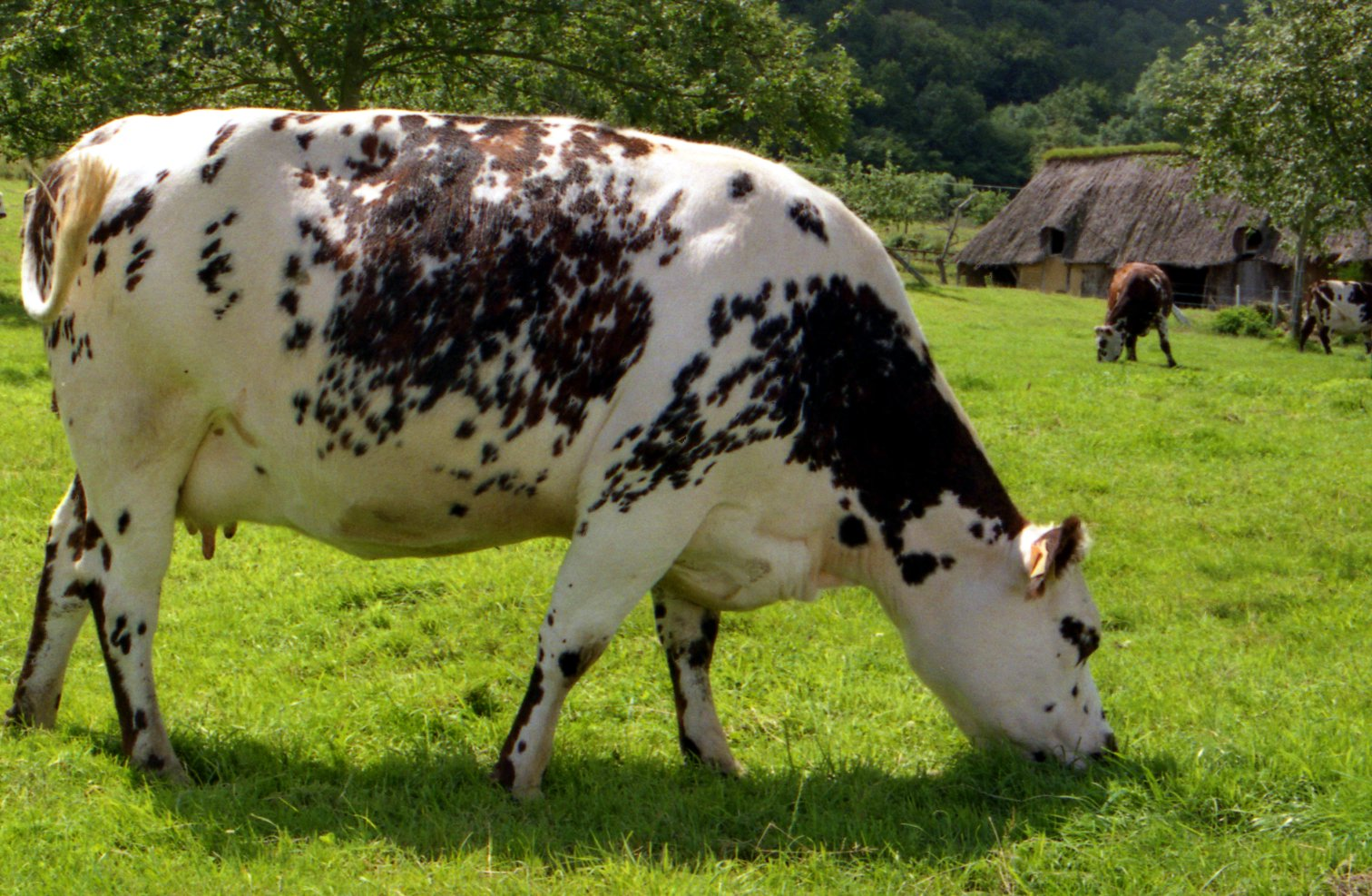
- Conservation status: FAO (2007): not at risk
- Country of origin: France
- Distribution: world-wide

Traits
- Weight: Male: 900–1100 kg; Female: 700–800 kg
- Height: Male: 155 cm; Female: 144 cm
- Skin colour: white
- Coat: red- or black-pied
- Horn status: horned in both sexes
- Cattle; Bos (primigenius) taurus

The Normande is a breed of dairy cattle from the Normandy region of north-west France. It is raised principally for its milk, which is high in fat and suitable for making butter and cheese, but also for its meat, which is marbled and good-flavoured. It is a world breed: it has been exported to many countries and is present on all continents.

== History ==
The Normande originated in Normandy in the early nineteenth century. It resulted from cross-breeding of local dairy breeds including the Augeronne, the Cauchoise and the Cotentine (all now extinct) with animals of the Durham breed (later known as the Shorthorn), which were imported from England from 1836 onwards. The French population of the Alderney breed was also absorbed into the Normande. A herd-book was started in 1883. Performance testing for bulls was introduced in 1952.

The Normande is a significant breed in France. In the 1960s there were some 4.5 million head, representing about a quarter of the national herd. In 2005 the total number in France was estimated at approximately 2.1 million.

The Normande has been exported to many countries and is present on all continents. Exports to South America began in 1877. Colombia has the largest population of Normande cattle outside France, reported at about 380,000. In Brazil, where the Normande was first imported in 1923, it has been cross-bred with zebuine cattle to create a hybrid, the Normanzu.

== Characteristics ==
The Normande is a large-bodied animal: cows usually weigh 700–800 kg, and bulls up to 1100 kg. The coat is usually red-pied or speckled, but may also be black-pied or blonde. The head is often white, and the surround of the eyes is commonly dark, giving a "spectacled" appearance. The skin is white and muzzle is dark.

The Normande is long-lived and calves easily. In Normandy it is usually kept on grass, but it adapts well to other environments. It has good resistance to sunshine and to extremes of heat and of altitude. It is well adapted to mechanical milking.

== Use ==
The Normande is a dual-purpose dairy breed, kept principally for its milk. Annual yield is 6595 litres in a lactation of 316 days. The milk has 4.4% fat and 3.6% protein. It is particularly suitable for making butter and cheese. The meat has good flavour and is marbled with fat.
