= Montbéliarde =

Breed of cattle

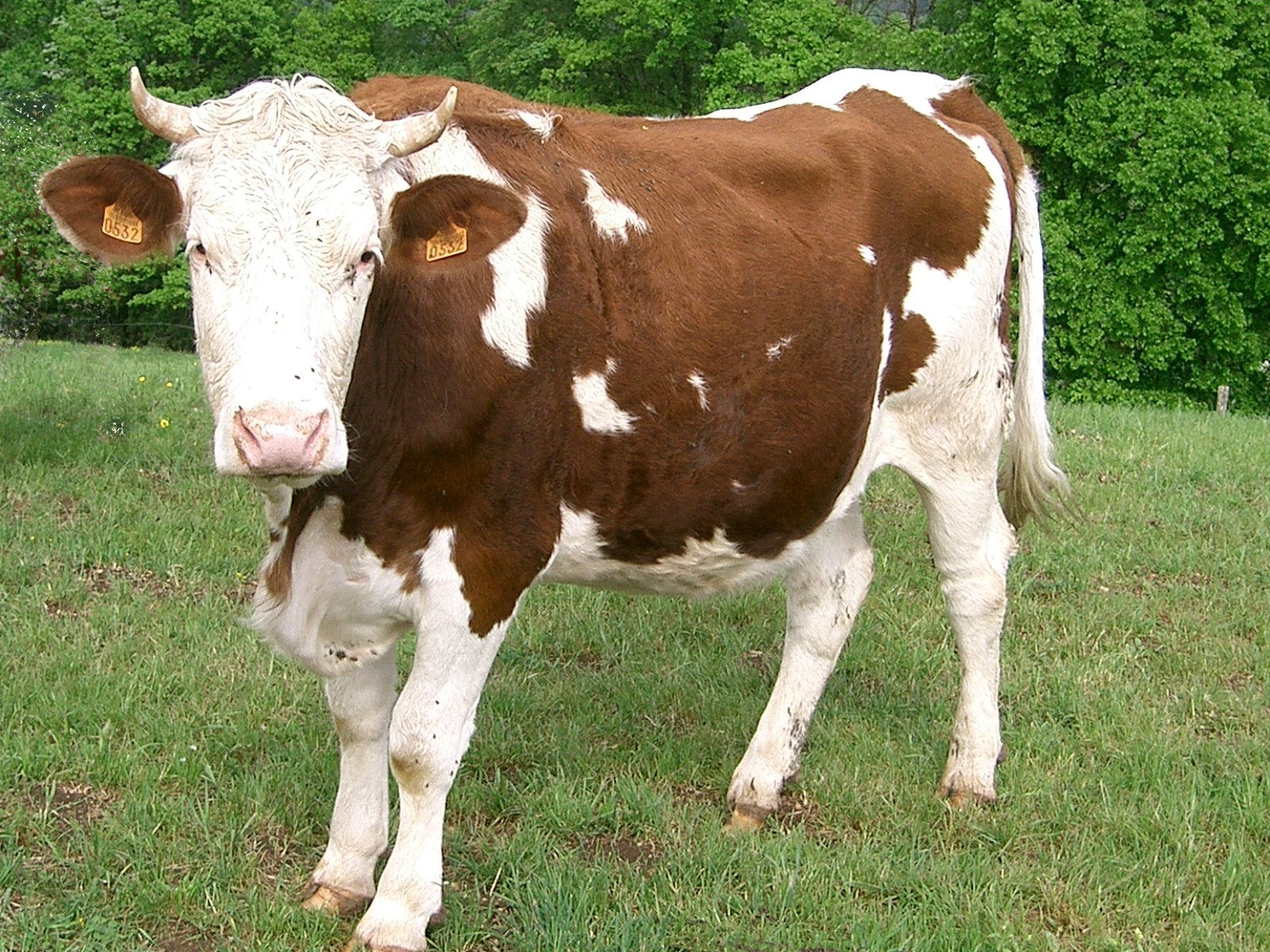
A Montbéliarde cow

The Montbéliarde (French pronunciation: [mɔ̃beljaʁd]) is a breed of red pied dairy cattle from the area of Montbéliard, in the département of Doubs, in the Bourgogne-Franche-Comté region of eastern France. It is used mainly for dairying and particularly for cheesemaking.

== History ==
The name Montbéliarde was first used by Joseph Graber in 1872, when exhibiting a group of cattle at the Langres agricultural competition. Before this the local stock from indigenous multipurpose breeds such as Fémeline and Tourache (later known as Comtoise) had been improved by Mennonite farmers from Switzerland, and named Franco-Swiss. In 1889, the breed was accepted officially, and a stud book was founded. Since 1980, the breed has been selected for good roughage conversion. After 1900, many cattle were sold to the Midi region and Algeria.

In the 1970s, Red Holstein was crossed into the breed. At the same time, they sporadically crossed with Fleckvieh bulls, but this was not very successful. In the 1990s, Montbéliarde cattle were used for crossing into the Danish Red cattle and Vorderwalder Cattle breeds.

== Characteristics ==
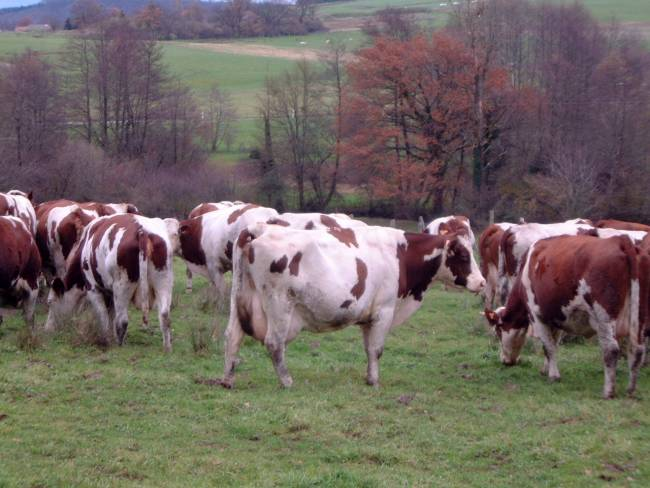

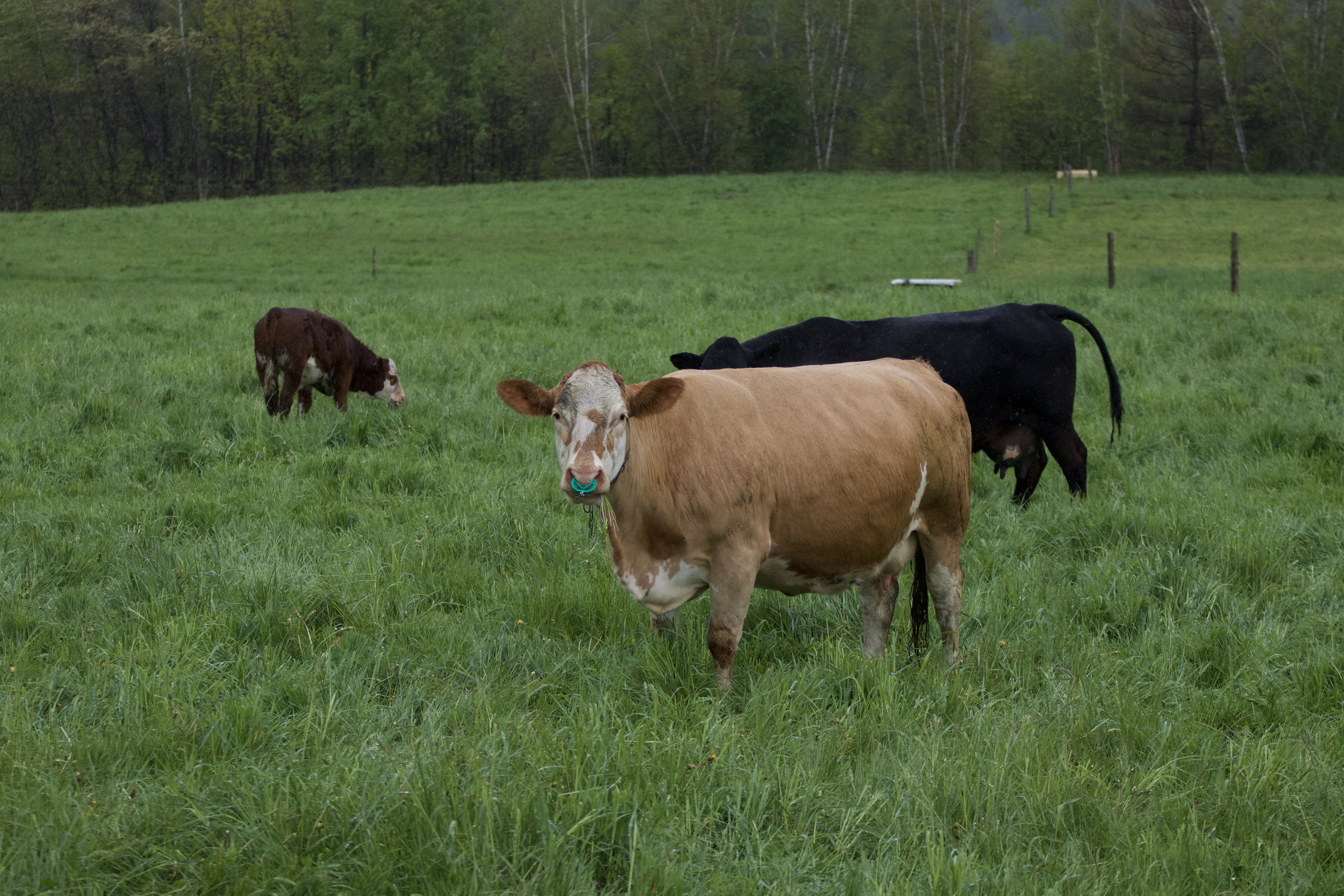
Cow (center) in a field in Magog, Quebec

The animals are red pied with white heads and short horns, and of dairy type. Mature cows weigh 600 to 700 kg (1,300 to 1,500 lb) and stand about 145 cm (57 in) tall at the withers, and mature bulls weigh 900 to 1,200 kg (2,000 to 2,600 lb). The milk is particularly well suited to cheesemaking because of a high frequency of kappa casein BB variants, giving higher yields of cheese. Being of less extreme dairy type than modern Holsteins, the cows have lower milk yields, but better longevity and fertility and lower cell counts in the milk, indicating lower mastitis incidence.

== Uses ==
Montbéliarde cattle are mainly a dairy breed, but have better beef characteristics than Holstein cattle. France has nearly 400,000 recorded Montbéliarde dairy cows, with an average adult annual lactation of 7,486 litres (1,978 US gallons) at 3.9% butterfat and 3.45% protein. The milk protein is of a type well suited to cheesemaking, and some herds are fed a hay-based diet to produce milk specifically for this purpose. Cull cows and bull calves are worth more than Holsteins. The breed has spread to many countries and is becoming popular for crossing with Holsteins to give improved longevity and fertility.
