= Marine Landaise =

French bovine breed

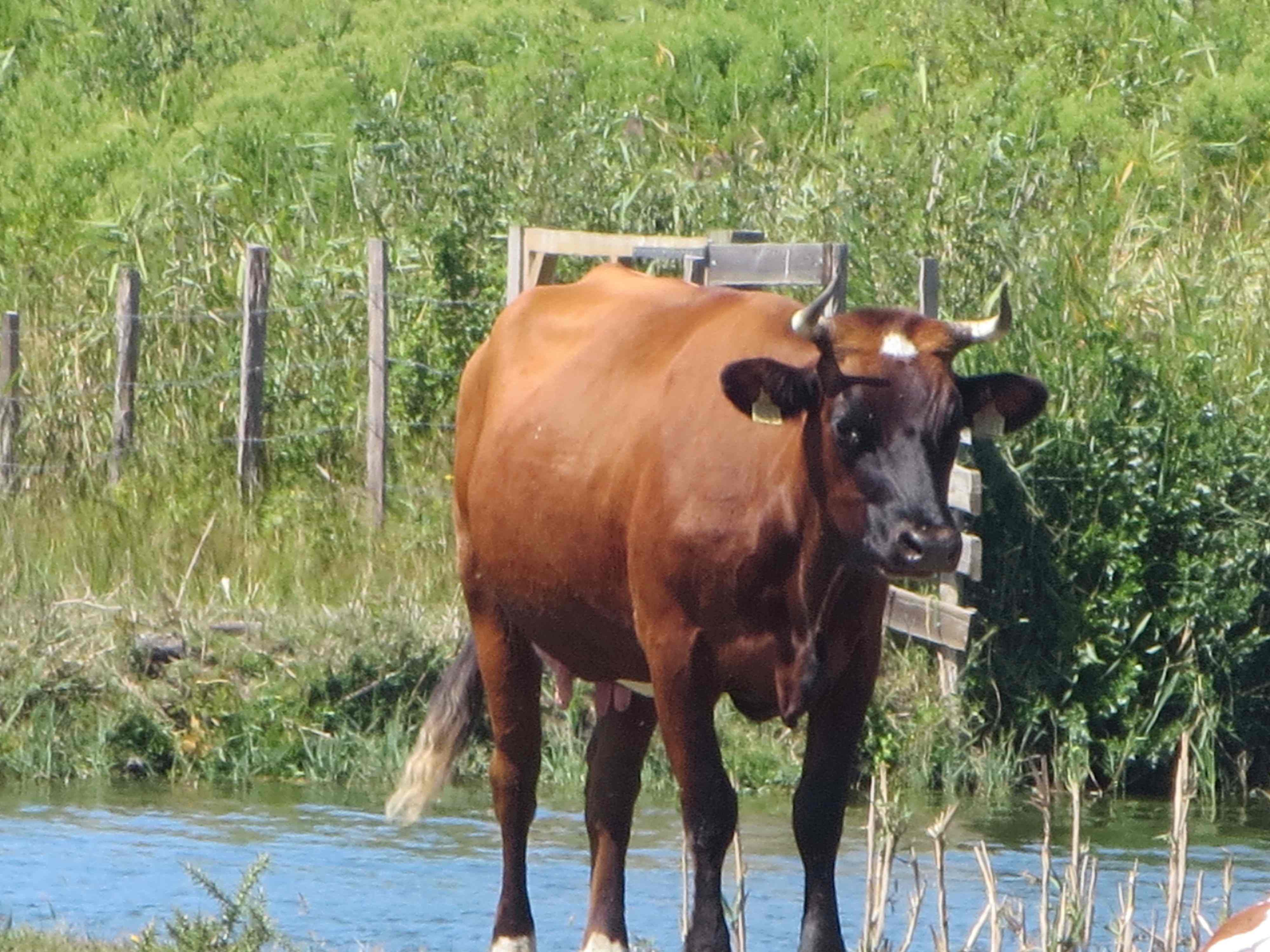
- Marine Landaise cattle
- Country of origin: Aquitaine, France
- Distribution: Local preserved breed
- Use: Maintenance of natural areas in wetlands

Traits
- Height: Small
- Coat: Brown, tawny, uniform, sometimes piebald

The Marine Landaise is a French bovine breed with a very small population, benefiting from a conservation program and maintained in humid natural areas along the coast of the Landes de Gascogne, in the Landes and Gironde regions. Its vocation is environmental. It should not be confused with the Spanish Fighting Bull used courses landaises (Landes races).

== Description ==
With small lyre-shaped horns, it measures 1.20–1.30 m at the withers and weighs barely 300 kg.

In the original type, which has now disappeared, the Marine Landaise had a wheaten coat, pink mucous membranes, and light extremities, like the other breeds in the blond bovine group of the Southwest, among which it was classified, such as the old Basquaise or Urt, Béarnaise, and Lourdaise breeds.

Currently, it has a tawny to brownish coat and a brown muzzle, which are evidence of the ancient introductions of animals with brown mucous membranes, Iberian or Breton pie-noir. The pie character is carried by some animals.

Bulls and cows preserved in Gradignan

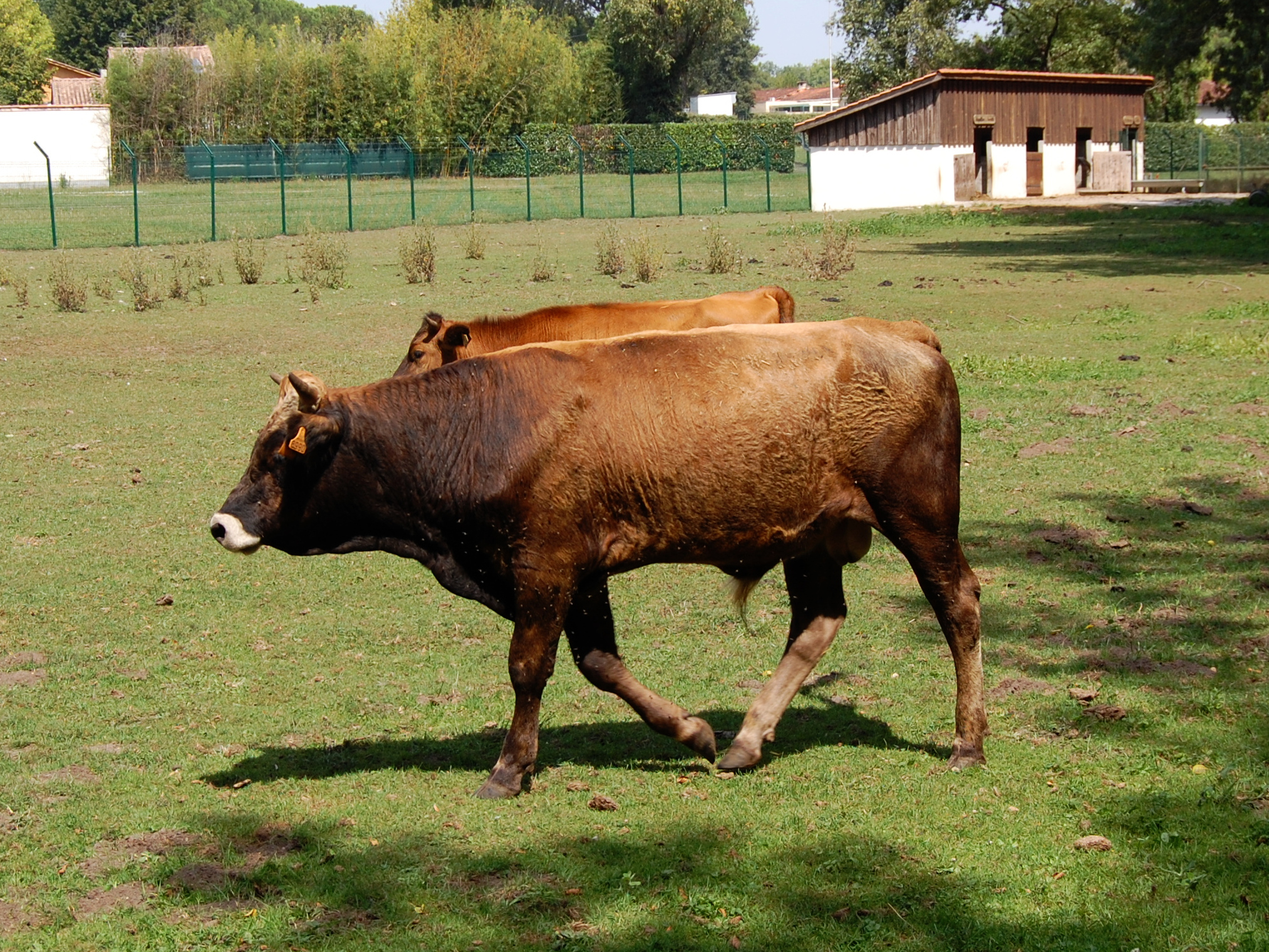

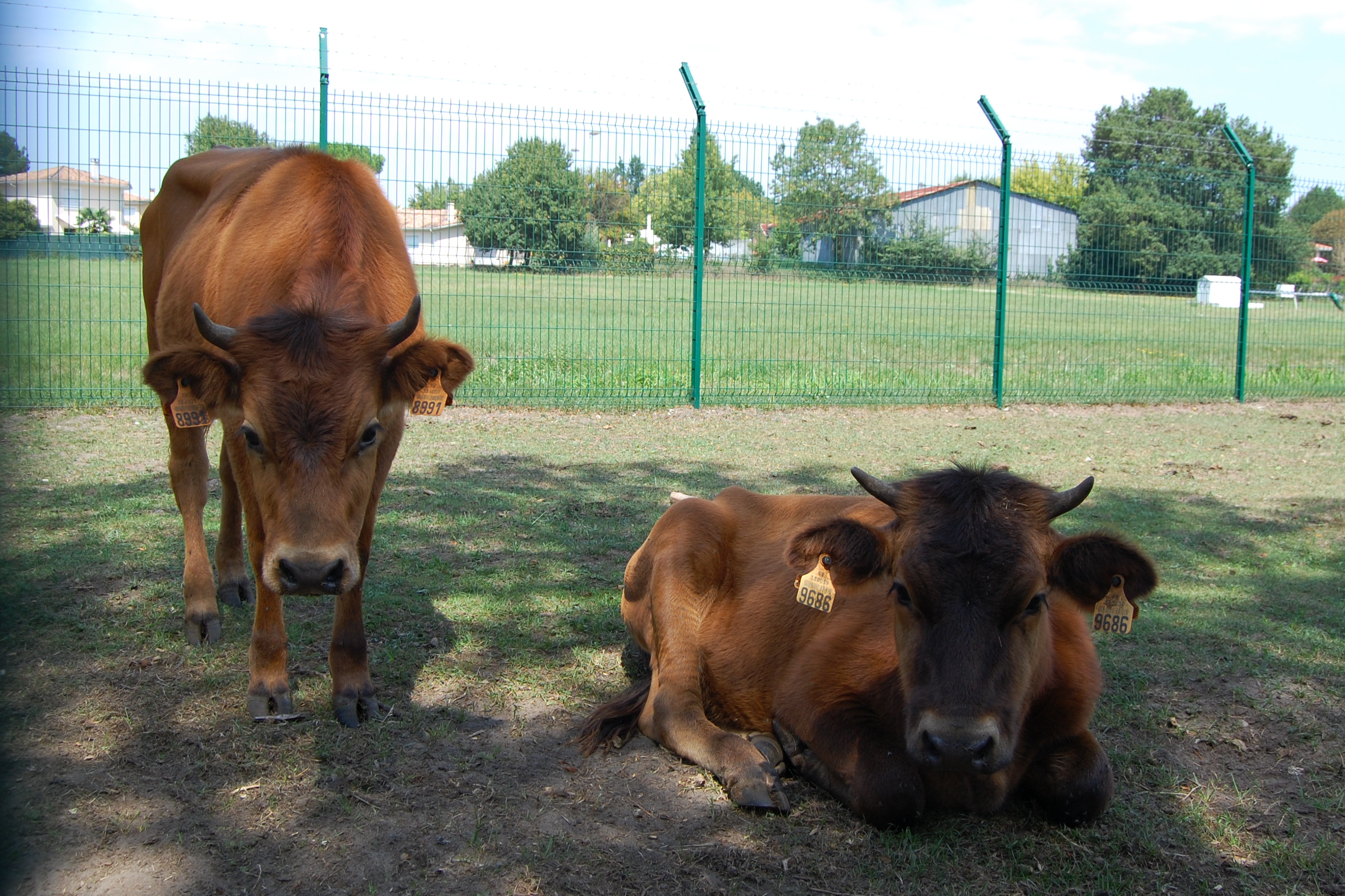

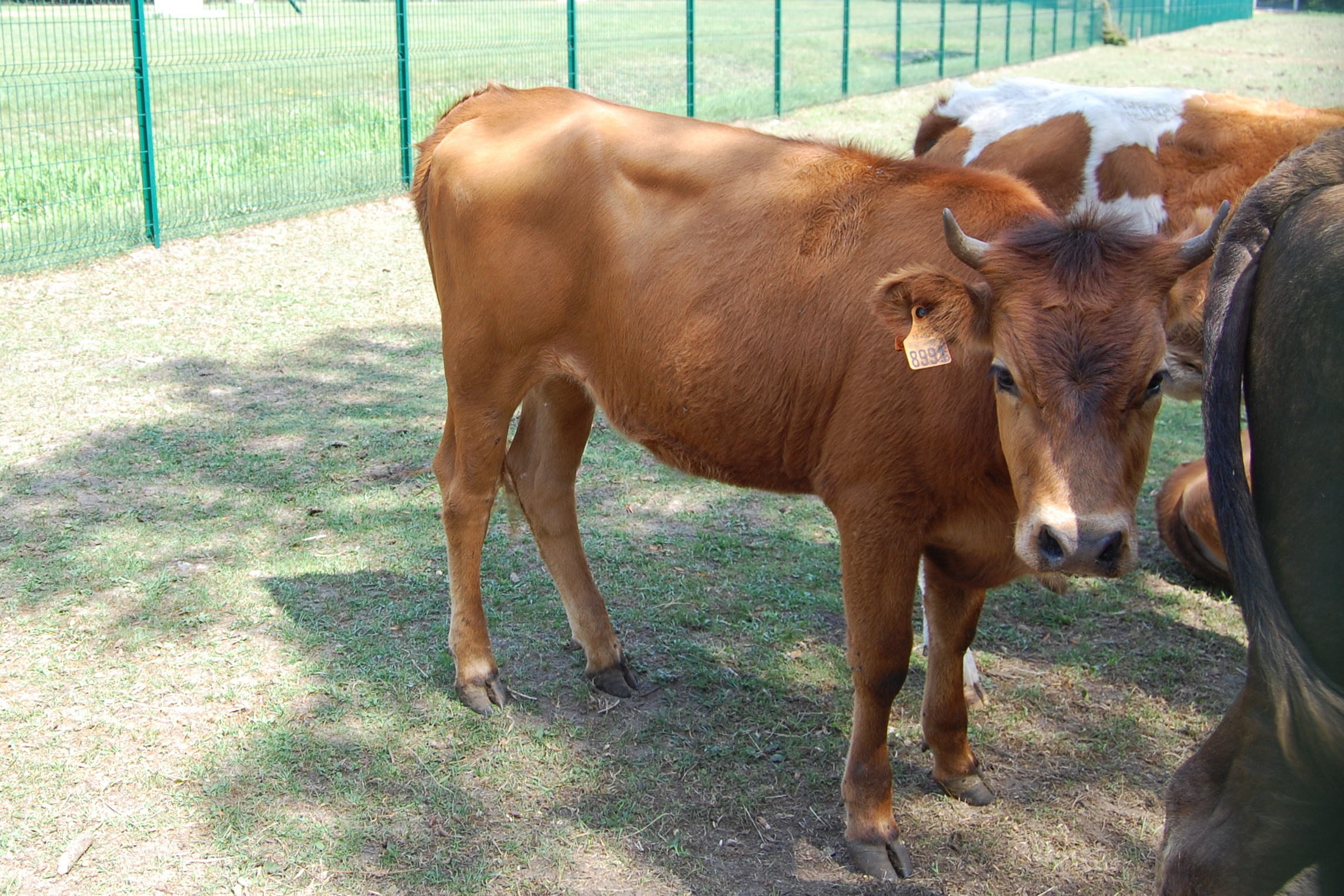

== History ==
=== From the original population to the current population ===
Originally, the Marine Landaise breed was a variant of the Pyrenean blond branch, whose current representatives are the Béarnaise and Lourdaise, breeds subject to conservation measures. From the late 19th century to the early 20th century, it underwent the influence of crossbreeding with Iberian cattle imported for Landes races and cattle of the Bretonne Pie Noir breed introduced for dairy production, resulting in the brown animals of the current population.

==== Ethnic Origins: The Landaise or Marine Breed within the Blond Bovine Branch of the Southwest ====
P. Dechambre, Zootechnics professor at the National Veterinary School of Alfort, authored a treatise on animal husbandry, with volume 3 dedicated to bovines published in 1913, providing the following state of the breed:

"The Marine breed mainly inhabits the coast of the Landes department. However, there are representatives in Armagnac (Gers department) and, in limited numbers, in Chalosse (southeast of the Landes). It used to supply all the cattle used for the races so highly esteemed in the region; its strength and agility earned it this privilege. However, in recent years, this particular outlet has slowed down, with a certain number of racing cows being imported from Spain.

The breed is small in size (maximum 1.30 m). It has a strong head, long and raised horns, a narrow chest, a high-set tail, clear joints, and slender limbs. Its coat is wheaten, with pink mucous membranes and light extremities. Some individuals, of questionable ethnic purity, are marked with red or brown.

By its characteristics, the Marine breed appears as a branch of the Western Pyrenees breed; it has remained uncultivated and poorly shaped due to the poverty of the environment and the little care given to its breeding.

The milk used in the Landes department is almost exclusively supplied by Breton cows brought from Morbihan. These imports are ancient; they concern young three-year-old cows and one to one-and-a-half-year-old heifers."

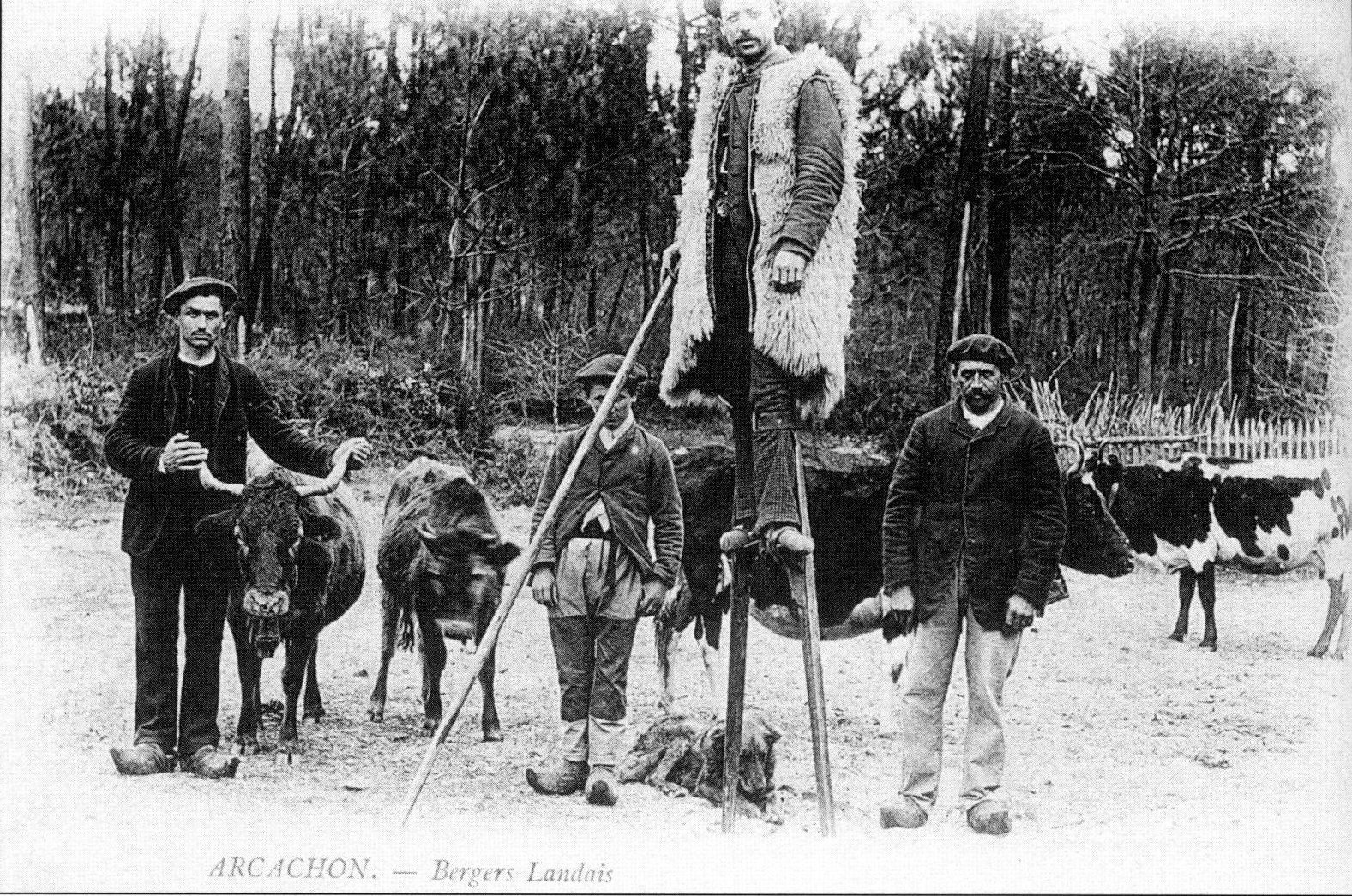
Landes shepherds and Landes cows of the original type

This text specifies the original ethnic background of a breed within the blond bovine group in the southwest with pink mucous membranes. It also mentions the introduction of Iberian and Breton subjects, with pigmented mucous membranes. The crossbreeding has resulted in the brown mucous membrane ethnic type observed today. Some subjects exhibit the pie character which is absent in the blond southwest group breeds. The current low lyre-shaped horns brought forward are also a characteristic feature of bovines with a straight cephalic profile (such as the Brava breed and the Bretonne Pie Noir breed). This differs from the high lyre-shaped horns with tips brought back, which are typical of other bovines in the Pyrenean group. The original Marine Landaise breed belonged to this group. The old photos below illustrate the composite nature of the origins of the current animals in their environment

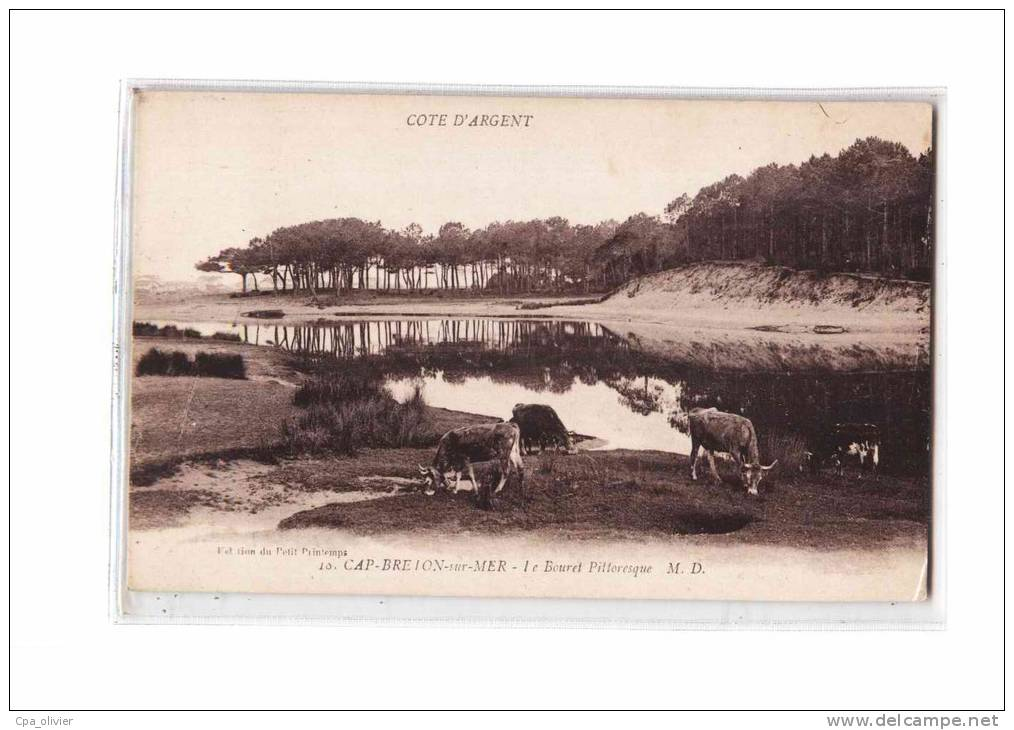
Original Marine Landaise cows, near Capbreton

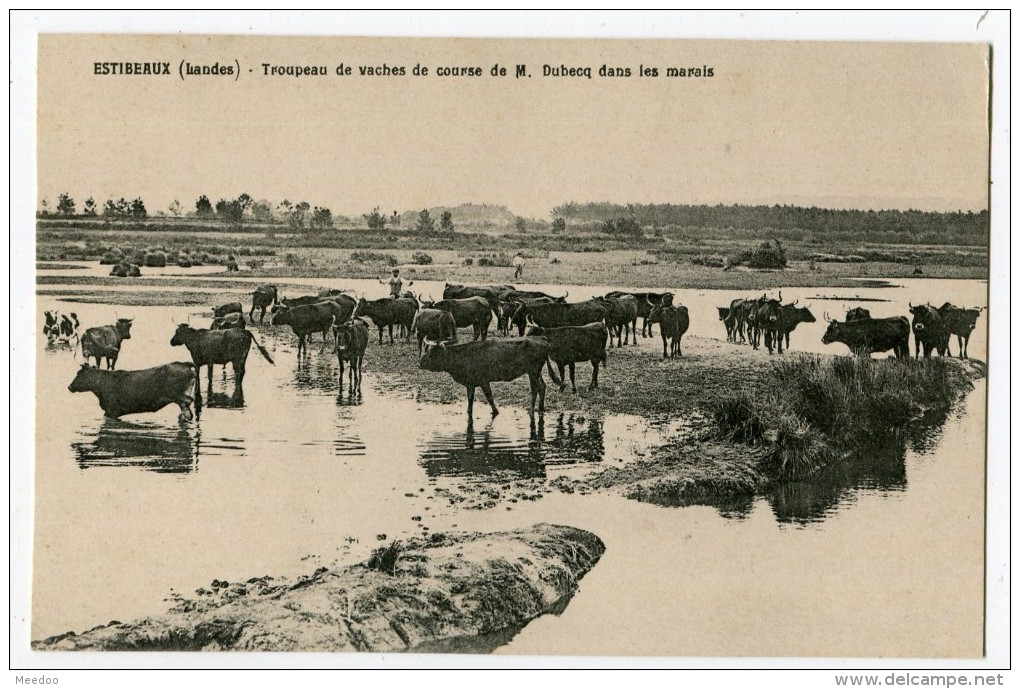
Iberian racing cows in a Landes marsh

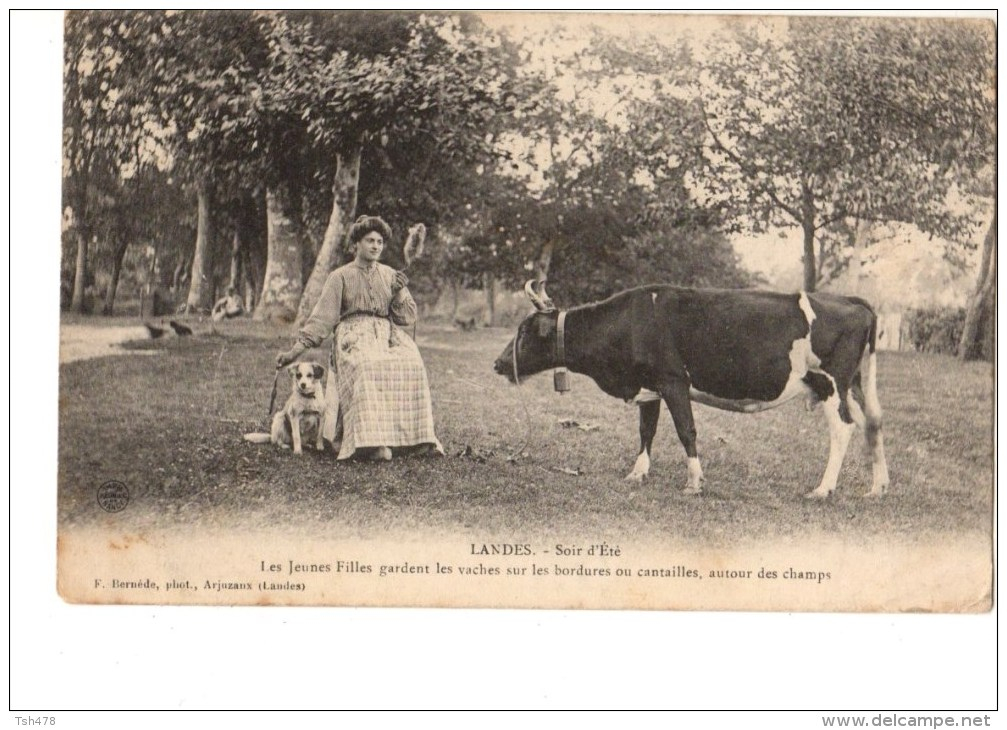
Bretonne Pie Noir cow in Landes

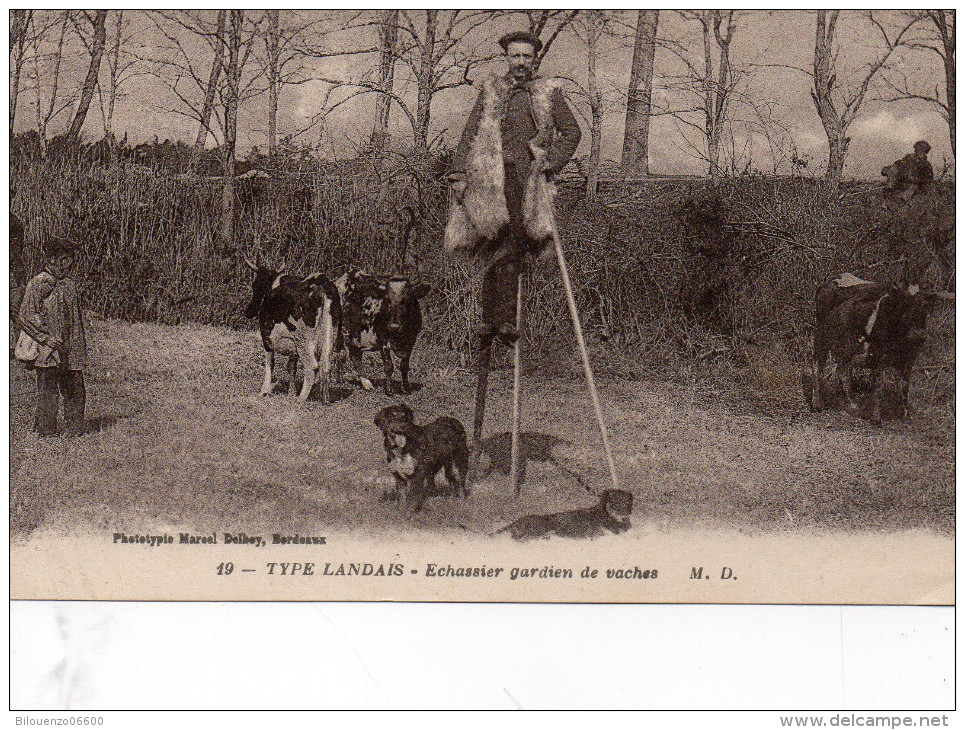
Landes shepherds and Bretonne Pie Noir cows

==== Old breeding practices ====
Marine cattle farming has long history of being extensive.

Historical texts and testimonies report that "wild" or semi-free herds roamed the marshes near the dunes or the coastal ponds, as evidenced by this report from 1739, addressed to the Intendant of Guyenne:

"The large livestock does not provide any manure in these areas because it is impossible to confine them in pens or stables. The oxen and cows are completely wild. Their instincts lead them to reach the dunes that are on the edge of the sea, all along the coast of the Médoc, Pays de Buch, Born, and Marensin. This livestock is outdoors all year round and feeds on the grass that grows in parts of these dunes."

Contrary to the belief, these herds are not entirely wild as implied by this correspondence. Village communities send their cattle to the coastal dunes during the harvest season. This "transhumance" provides them temporary relief from surveillance and maintenance.

As the dunes stabilized in Aquitaine in the 19th century and the Landes de Gascogne was colonized by maritime pine, the semi-marshy shores of the ponds became the refuge for these herds. They found abundant vegetation, including Carex coepista, young shoots of Arundo and Digitaria.

This extensive semi-wild state of husbandry practices is also observed in the mountainous lands of the neighboring Basque Country, where the Betizu cattle, another variant of the blond Pyrenean branch, has a population that had preserved the original characteristics of its coat due to minimal crossbreeding. In both cases, the breeders captured animals through trapping, and their meat was valued.

Until the interwar period, similar herds were left by their owners around Lake Biscarrosse and Parentis. Mobile enclosures, called barguèiras, were used by cowherds to gather the cattle to mark and select them. Young "coupes" (plots recently planted with pine trees) were carefully monitored to prevent damage caused by cows.

==== Origins of Landais Bull Racing ====
The capture of animals kept in freedom and in a semi-wild state is associated with the origins of the Lands bull racing.

=== Near-Disappearance and Conservation ===
World War II marked the end of the bovine: the German army and the people of the Landes decimated the marine cows. After the war, only a few herds of these cows remained, which eventually became particularly wild. The last of these "marine" cows in a feral state lived in Biscarrosse before disappearing in 1963.

According to what is sometimes reported, in 1968, "an old man sold his herd of cows before retiring. The horse dealer who bought the cows was astonished when he concluded: “These are authentic marine cows, a breed that was thought to be extinct." As can be seen above, these were not the original Landais cows that disappeared but were descendants of them after crossbreeding with animals of the Bretonne Pie Noir and Brava breeds.

The uniqueness of these animals and their adaptation to a wet environment prompted the French Society for the Study, Protection, and Development of Nature in the Southwest (SEPANSO), immediately alerted, to reintroduce them into the Etang de Cousseau National Nature Reserve in Gironde. Currently, the breed is maintained there, although it faces a threat of inbreeding. In 2012, there were fifty-one heads spread across seven herds. To reduce the risk of inbreeding, the breeders are fragmented into distinct herds and exchanged. It is not officially recognized in the list of French breeds, but the gene pool of these animals should be preserved due to their adaptation to a natural life in wetlands.

Marine Landaise cattles in their natural environment, near the Moïsan lake in Messanges, Landes<ref>"Ville de Messanges: Des vaches marines à Messanges" (in French).</ref>

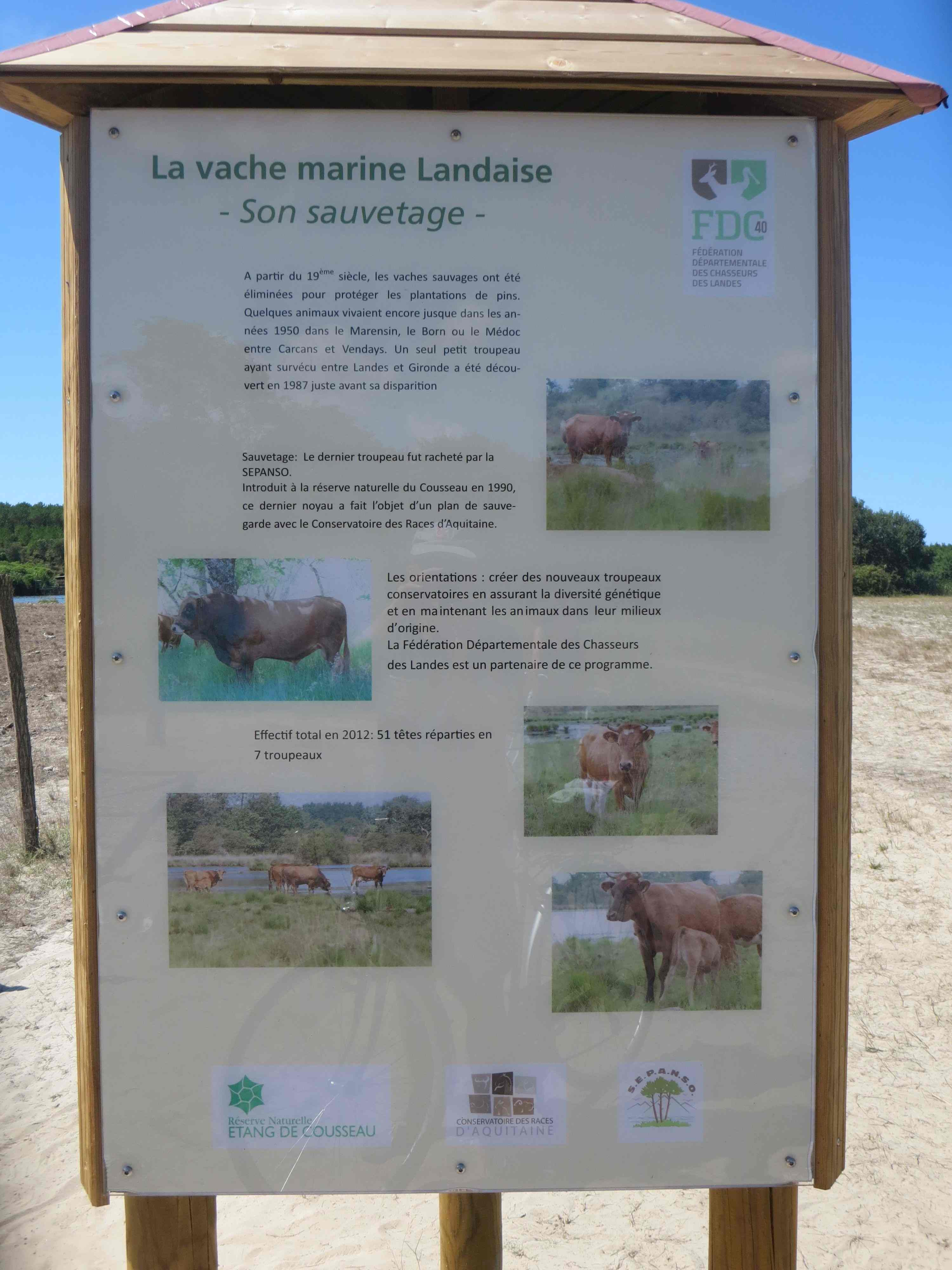

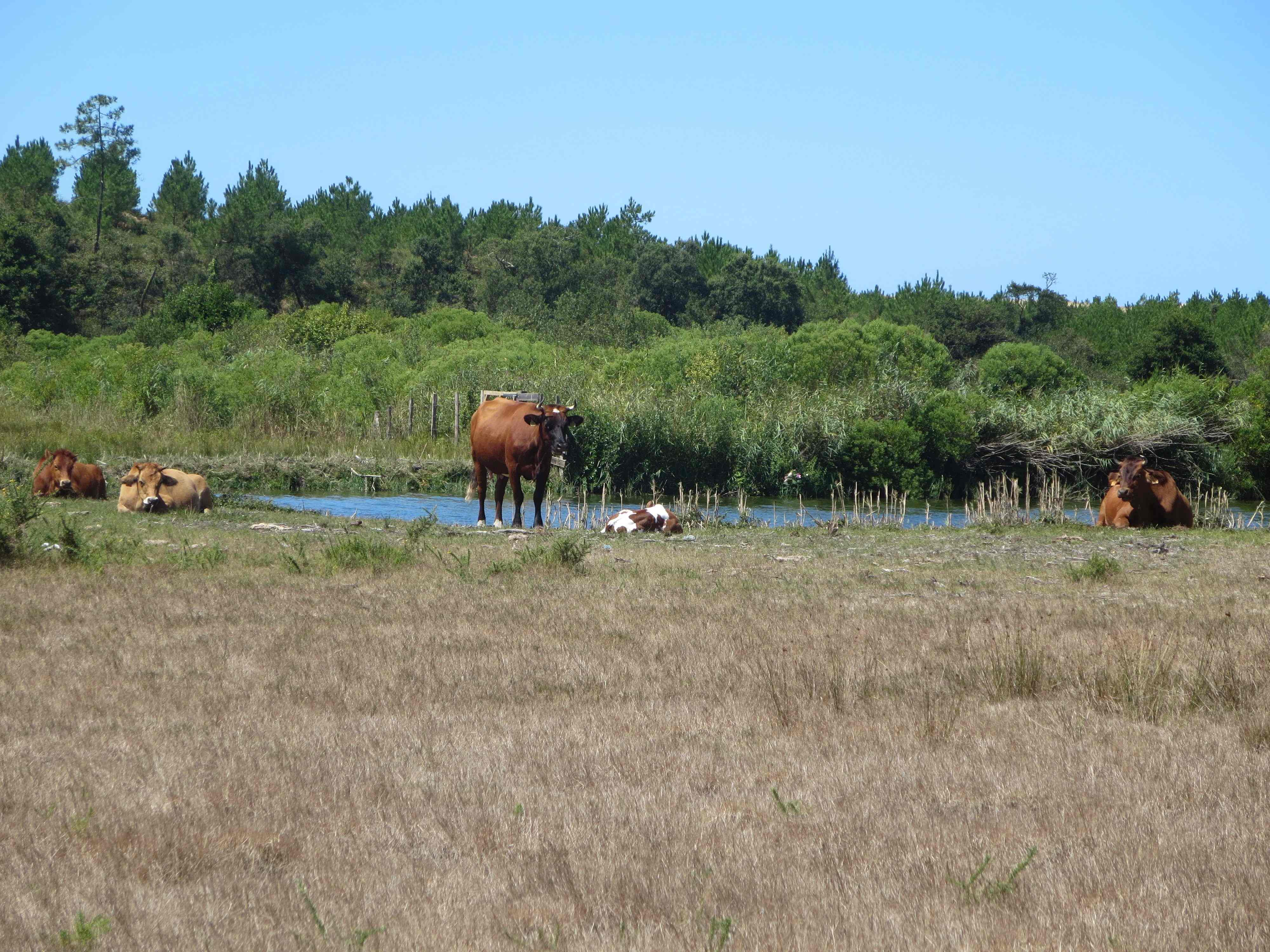

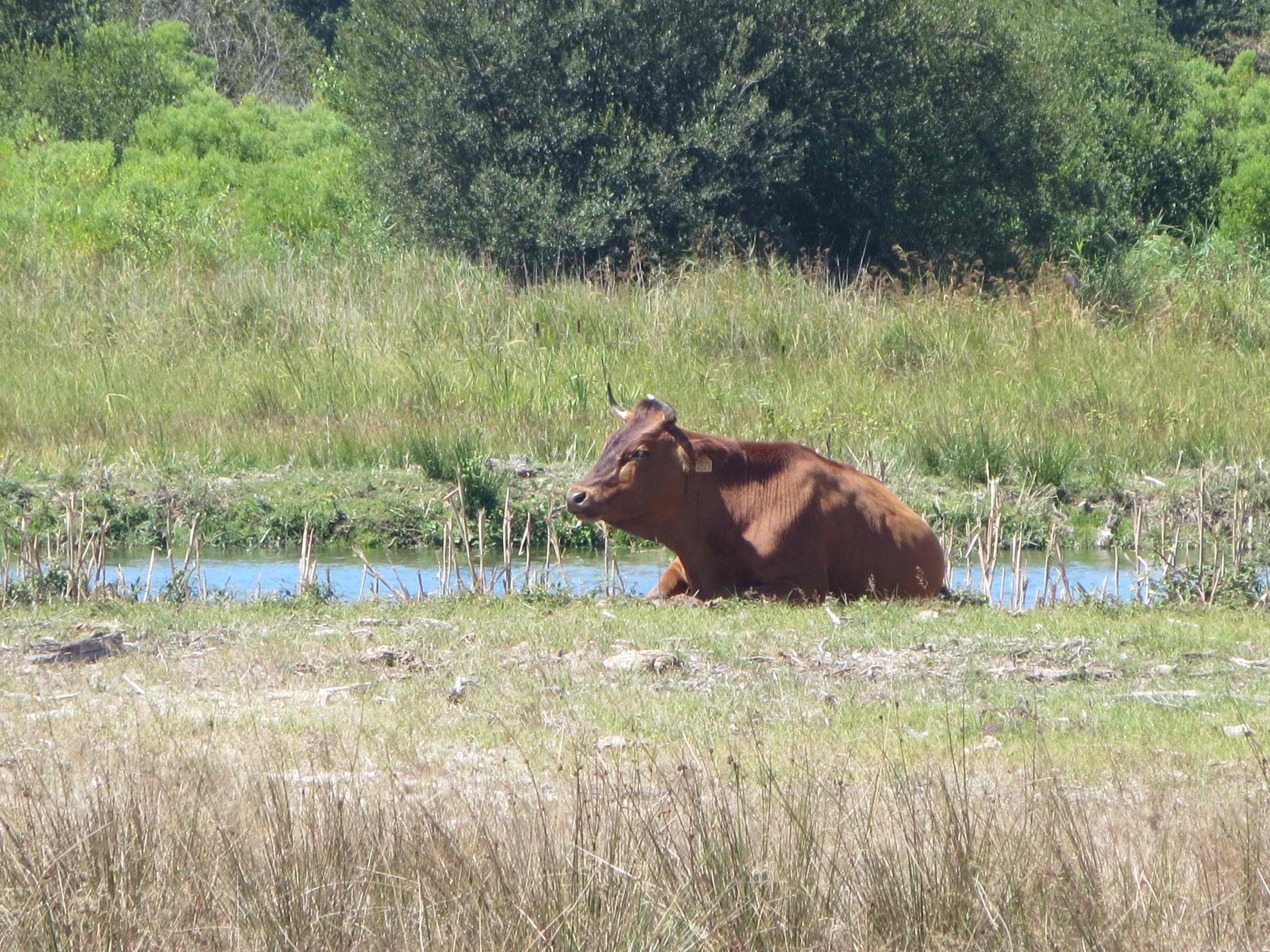

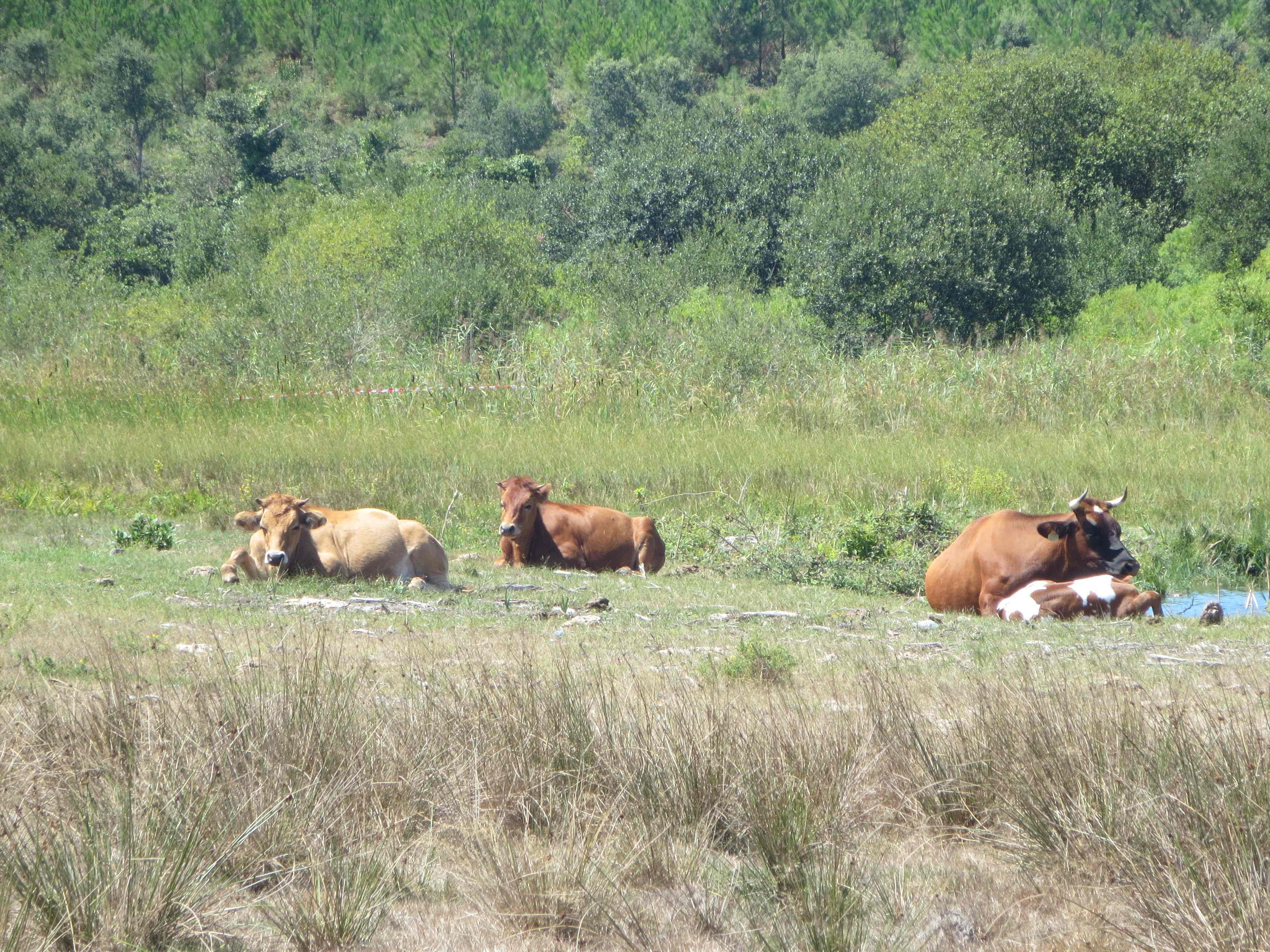

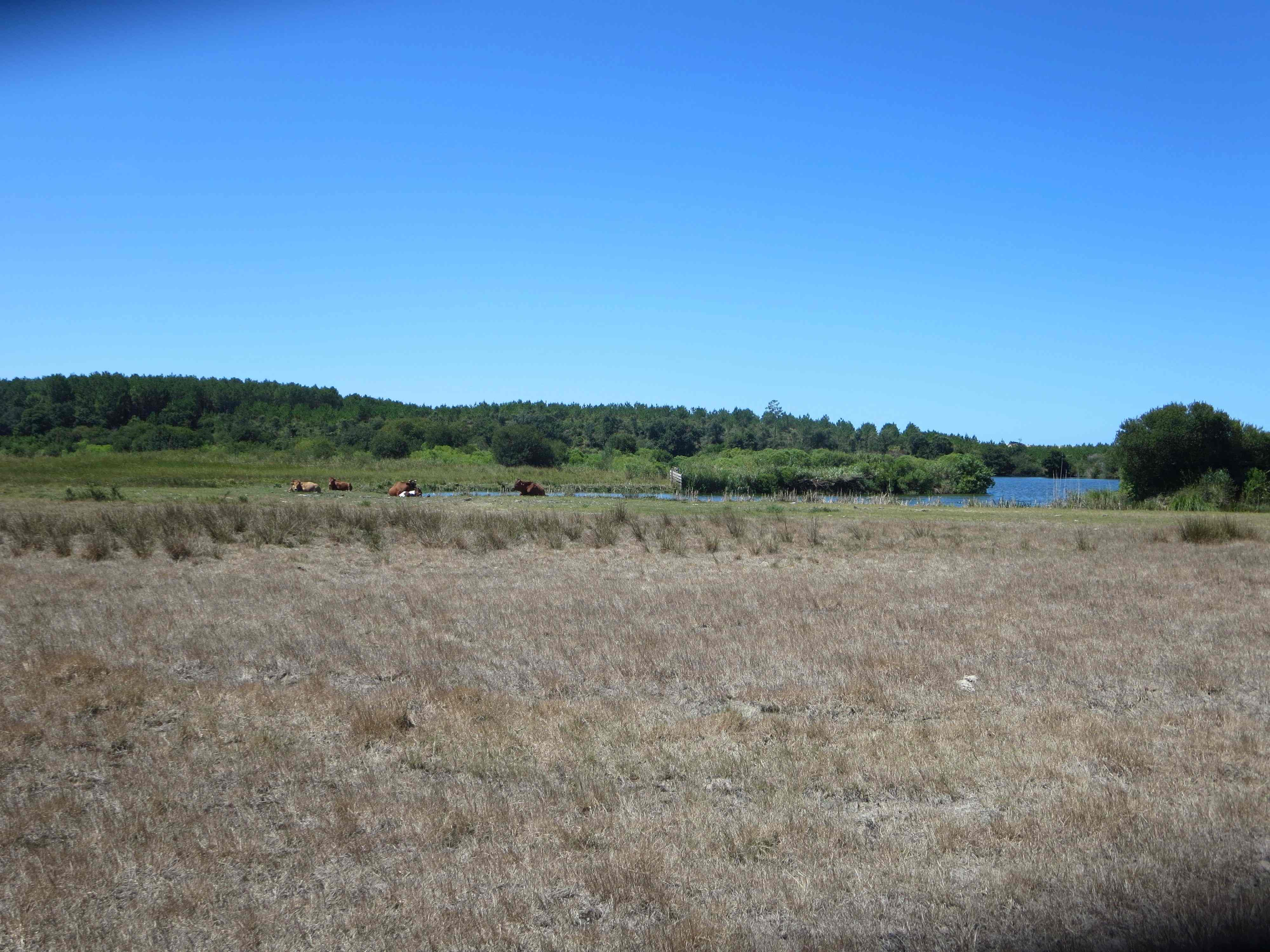

== Current Exploitation of the Marine Breed: Conservation grazing ==
The preservation and maintenance of the Marine Landaise by a nature protection society, SEPANSO, in collaboration with the Landes hunters' federation, determine the implementation of the current breeding method: conservation grazing. This method focuses solely on environmental interests and natural environment management, regardless of agricultural interests with which the breed is no longer associated.

In the case of the Marine Landaise, a particular form of conservation grazing is employed, known as naturalistic management. According to Catherine Proffitː

"Its purpose is to restore, increase, and preserve biodiversity at the lowest cost. It often involves marshy environments with significant biological richness and benefiting from strong protection measures. The general trend in herd management is to minimize human interventions. Grazing is entirely free, except when there are plot constraints. No supplementation is provided to the animals except in years when the weather conditions are particularly harsh."

Naturalistic management does not focus on agricultural purpose based on obtaining a breeding product, setting it apart from traditional agricultural management that was prevalent in the old marine breeding system.

== Quotes ==
- In his 1818 publication titled Agricultural, Botanical, and Picturesque Journey in parts of the Landes, Lot-et-Garonne, and those of Gironde, Jean Florimond Boudon de Saint-Amans reports that "in the dunes near La Teste (...), bulls grazed all year round in the heath where they lived freely." Once a year, these semi-wild beasts were gathered to be marked "with their respective owners’ seal."
- In Grandes Notes (Volume VII of the Œuvres Complètes), Félix Arnaudin mentions los vaquèrs deu sable (the sand cowherds), returning from the salt pannes in spring. They would stop at a place called Bos-Tauraou (from Bòsc Taurau: Wood of the Bull), headed towards the Ligautenx lands to Lüe or Tauziet to Sabres.
- In 1938, Pierre Toulgouat, a photographer and ethnologist, observed the remaining specimens in the wild on the east bank of Lake Biscarrosse: "They sank into the water up to their bellies, among the reeds, to escape the summer heat. With their harmless appearance, these cows were accompanied by bulls who, in these solitudes, did not like to be disturbed."

== Sources ==
- Fénié, Jean-Jacques; Taillentou, Jean-Jacques (2007). Lacs, Etangs et Courants du Littoral Aquitain (in French). Confluences.
- d'Odorico, Joëlle; Taillentou, Jean-Jacques; Ullas, Raymond (2007). L'Almanach du Landais (in French). CPE.

== See also ==
=== Related articles ===
- Courses landaises
- List of cattle breeds
- List of French cattle breeds
- History of French cattle breeding

=== External links ===
- "Conservatoire des races d'Aquitaine: la vache Marine" (in French).
- "Humanité-Dimanche du 25 au 31 juillet 2013: La Marine des Landes sauvée in extremis ...par des chasseurs" (PDF) (in French). Archived from the original (PDF) on November 17, 2021.
- Sauvetage des Vaches marines Landaises (Video) (in French). FEDECHASSEURSLANDES. December 11, 2014.
- "Des racines et des ailes: le sanctuaire des vaches marines" (in French). January 28, 2015. Archived from the original on April 7, 2024.
