= Château de Montbron (Landes) =

Château in Biscarrosse, France

Coordinates: 44.3950°N 1.1691°W

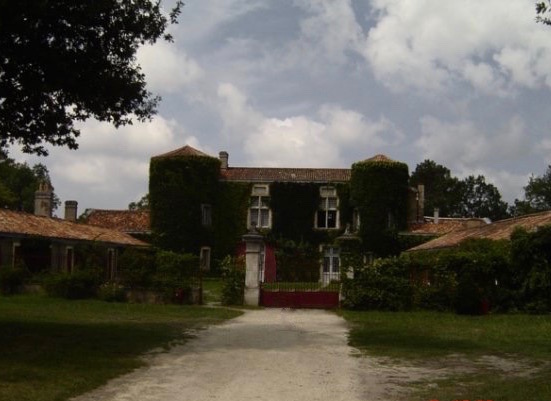
Château de Montbron

The Château de Montbron, formerly the Château de Biscarrosse is a château in the commune of Biscarrosse, in Landes, Nouvelle-Aquitaine, France. It dates to the 16th century.
