= Parentis =

Parentis may refer to:

- Parentis-en-Born
- In loco parentis
