= Gastes =

- Commune
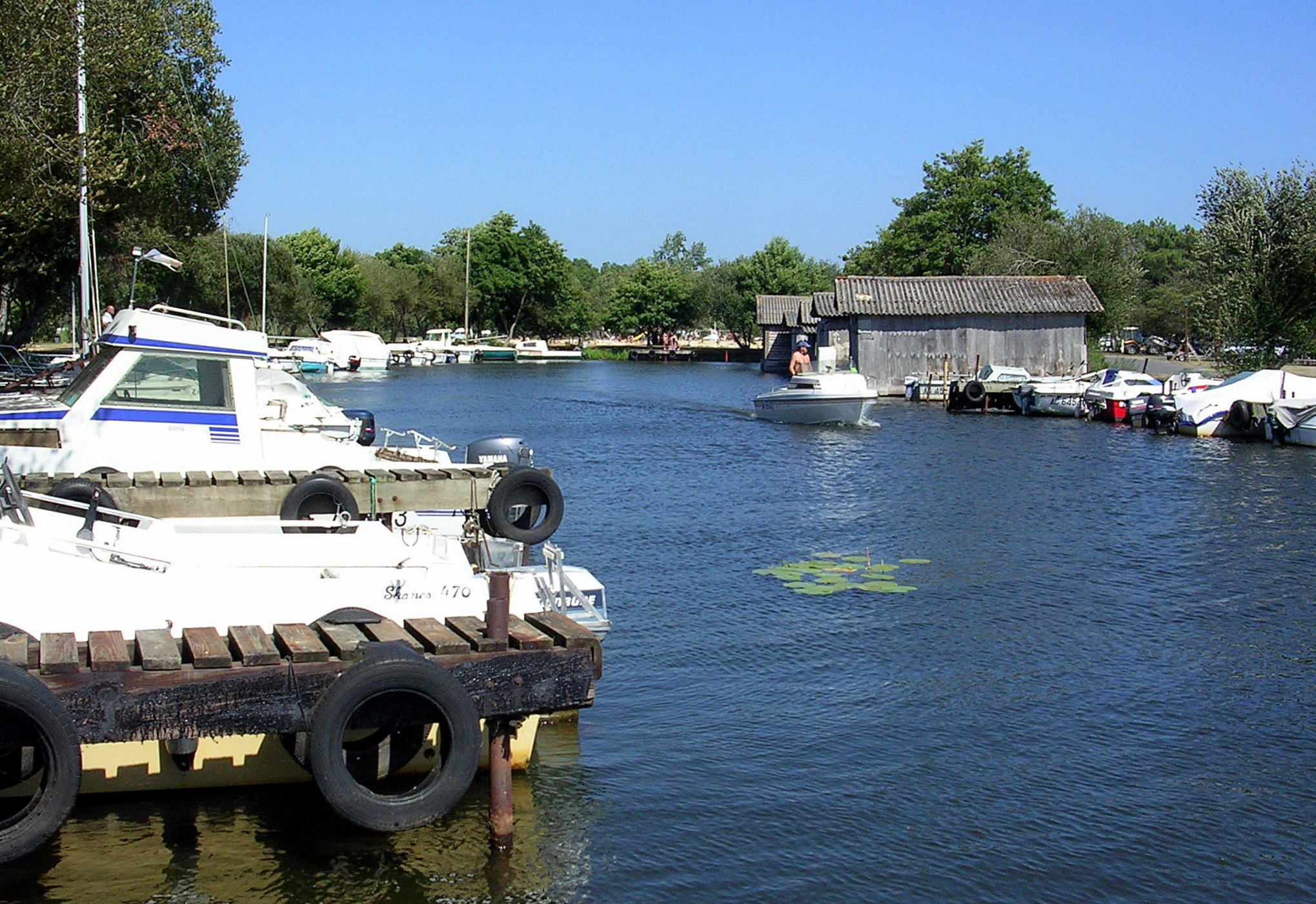
- L'Etang de Gastes
- Location of Gastes
- Location within France Location within Nouvelle-Aquitaine
- Coordinates: 44°19′38″N 1°08′42″W
- Country: France
- Region: Nouvelle-Aquitaine
- Department: Landes
- Arrondissement: Mont-de-Marsan
- Canton: Grands Lacs
- Intercommunality: Grands Lacs

Government
  - Mayor (2020–2026): Françoise Douste
- Area^{1}: 35.23 km^{2} (13.60 sq mi)
- Elevation: 24 m (79 ft)
- Highest elevation: 60 m (200 ft)
- Lowest elevation: 2 m (6.6 ft)
- Population (2023): 925
  - Density: 26.3/km^{2} (68.0/sq mi)
- Time zone: UTC+01:00 (CET)
  - Summer (DST): UTC+02:00 (CEST)
- INSEE/Postal code: 40108 /40160
- ^{1} French Land Register data, which excludes lakes, ponds, glaciers > 1 km^{2} (0.386 sq mi or 247 acres) and river estuaries.

Gastes (French pronunciation: [ɡast]; Occitan: Gastas) is a commune in the Landes department in Nouvelle-Aquitaine in southwestern France. It is located in the Landes forest, between Mimizan and Biscarrosse.

== Etymology ==
The name of the commune, Gastes, comes from Latin vastas, which means an "empty/deserted land". It synonymous with French gâtine.

== Population ==
Historical population
Year	Pop.	±% p.a.
1968	205	—
1975	259	+3.40%
1982	281	+1.17%
1990	368	+3.43%
1999	410	+1.21%
2007	583	+4.50%
2012	627	+1.47%
2017	816	+5.41%
2023	925	+2.11%
Source: INSEE

== See also ==
- Communes of the Landes department
