= Liposthey =

- Commune
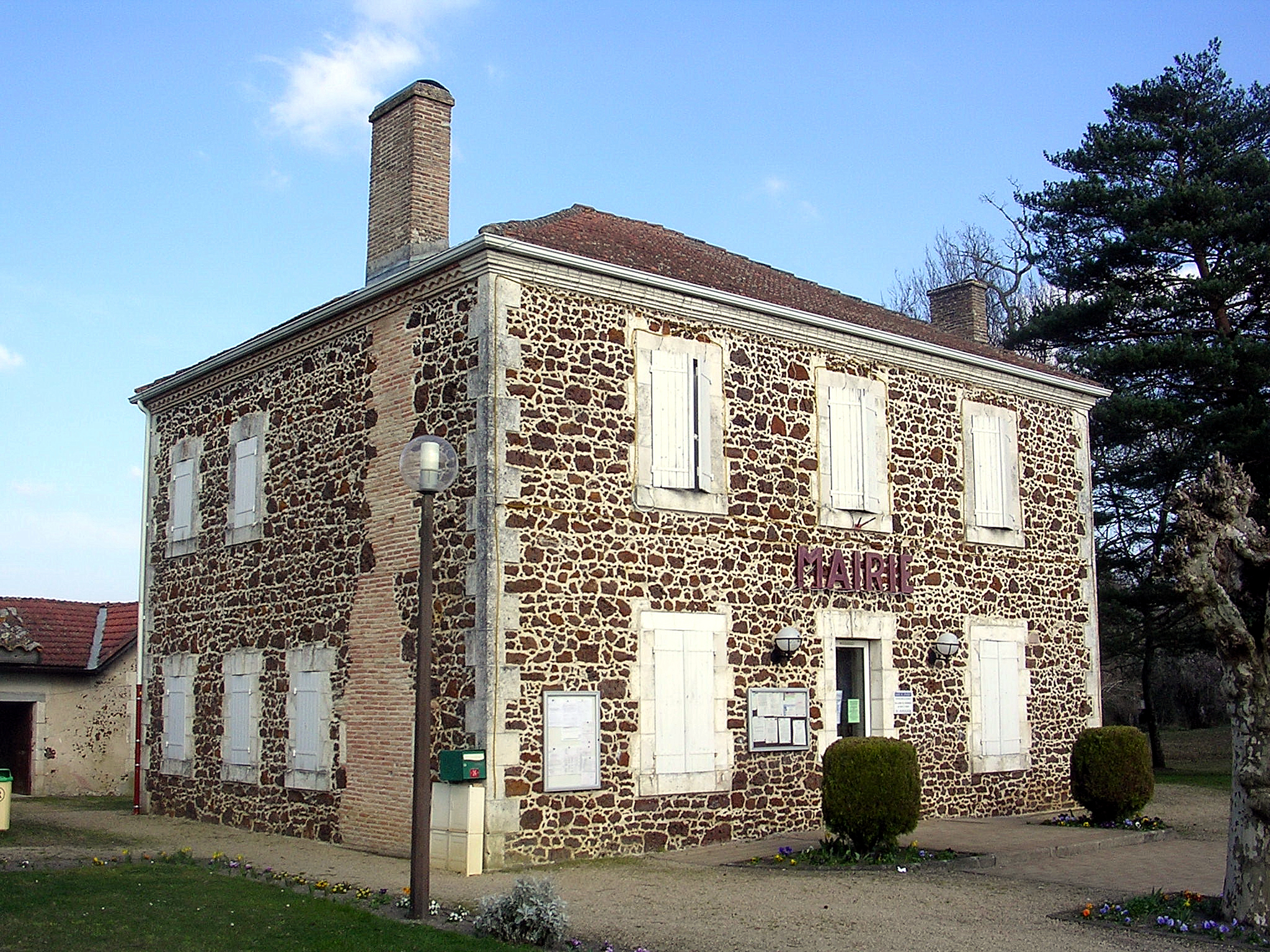
- The town hall in Liposthey
- Location of Liposthey
- Location within France Location within Nouvelle-Aquitaine
- Coordinates: 44°19′05″N 0°52′43″W
- Country: France
- Region: Nouvelle-Aquitaine
- Department: Landes
- Arrondissement: Mont-de-Marsan
- Canton: Grands Lacs
- Intercommunality: Cœur Haute Lande

Government
  - Mayor (2020–2026): Michel Poujoux
- Area^{1}: 23.97 km^{2} (9.25 sq mi)
- Elevation: 66 m (217 ft)
- Highest elevation: 73 m (240 ft)
- Lowest elevation: 61 m (200 ft)
- Population (2023): 603
  - Density: 25.2/km^{2} (65.2/sq mi)
- Time zone: UTC+01:00 (CET)
  - Summer (DST): UTC+02:00 (CEST)
- INSEE/Postal code: 40156 /40410
- ^{1} French Land Register data, which excludes lakes, ponds, glaciers > 1 km^{2} (0.386 sq mi or 247 acres) and river estuaries.

Liposthey (French pronunciation: [lipɔstɛ]; Occitan: Lipostèir) is a commune in the Landes department in Nouvelle-Aquitaine in south-western France.

== See also ==
- Communes of the Landes department
