= Moustey =

- Commune
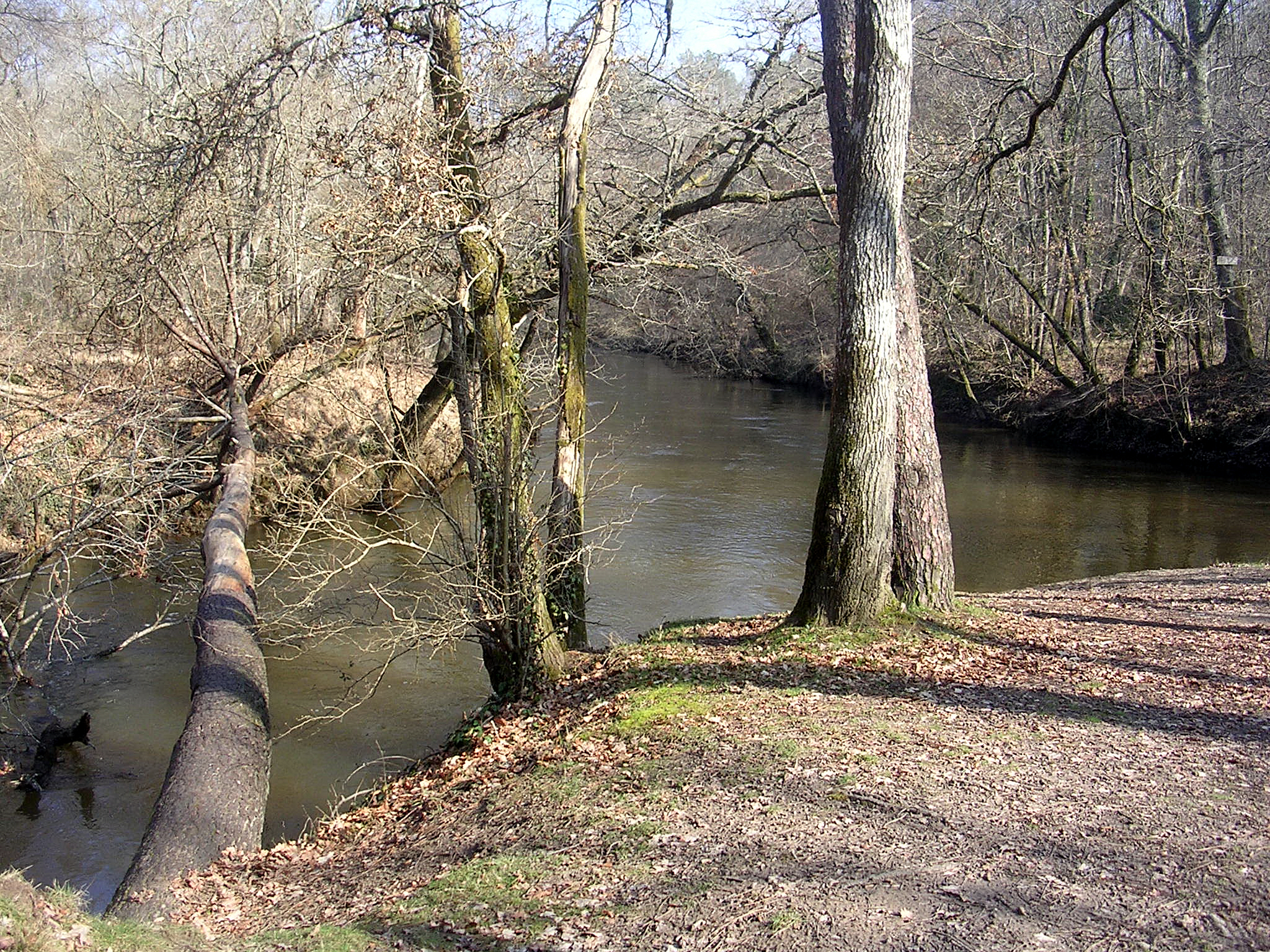
- Confluence of the Grande and Petit Leyre at Moustey
- Location of Moustey
- Location within France Location within Nouvelle-Aquitaine
- Coordinates: 44°21′36″N 0°45′33″W
- Country: France
- Region: Nouvelle-Aquitaine
- Department: Landes
- Arrondissement: Mont-de-Marsan
- Canton: Grands Lacs

Government
  - Mayor (2020–2026): Vincent Ichard
- Area^{1}: 67.31 km^{2} (25.99 sq mi)
- Elevation: 48 m (157 ft)
- Highest elevation: 63 m (207 ft)
- Lowest elevation: 19 m (62 ft)
- Population (2023): 798
  - Density: 11.9/km^{2} (30.7/sq mi)
- Time zone: UTC+01:00 (CET)
  - Summer (DST): UTC+02:00 (CEST)
- INSEE/Postal code: 40200 /40410
- ^{1} French Land Register data, which excludes lakes, ponds, glaciers > 1 km^{2} (0.386 sq mi or 247 acres) and river estuaries.

Moustey (French pronunciation: [mustɛj]; Occitan: Mostèirs e Viganon) is a commune in the Landes department in Nouvelle-Aquitaine in southwestern France.

== Population ==
Historical population
| Year | Pop. | ±% p.a. |
|---|---|---|
| 1968 | 545 | — |
| 1975 | 519 | −0.70% |
| 1982 | 540 | +0.57% |
| 1990 | 574 | +0.77% |
| 1999 | 607 | +0.62% |
| 2007 | 655 | +0.96% |
| 2012 | 671 | +0.48% |
| 2017 | 695 | +0.71% |
| 2023 | 798 | +2.33% |
Source: INSEE

== Gallery ==
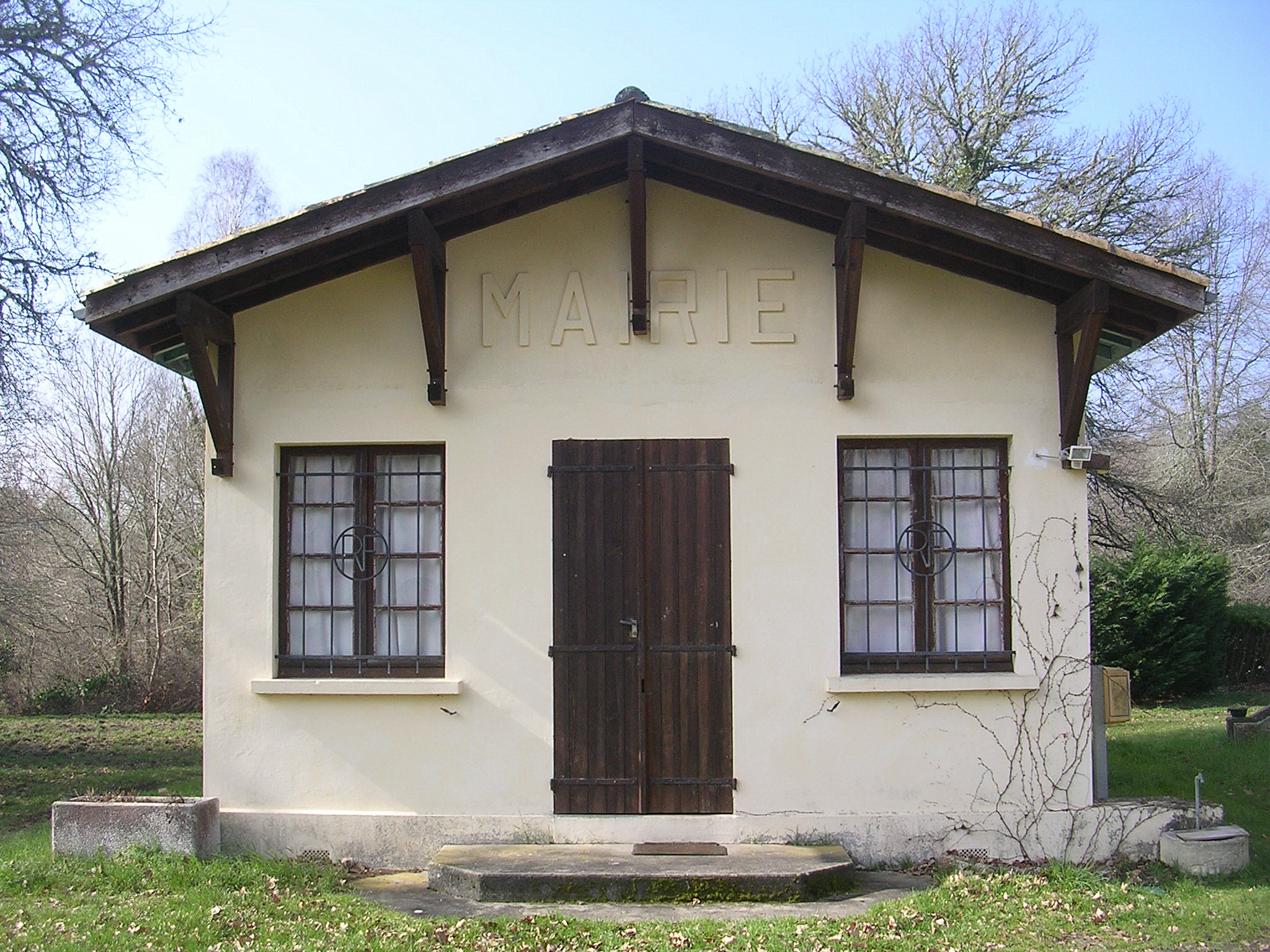
Town hall

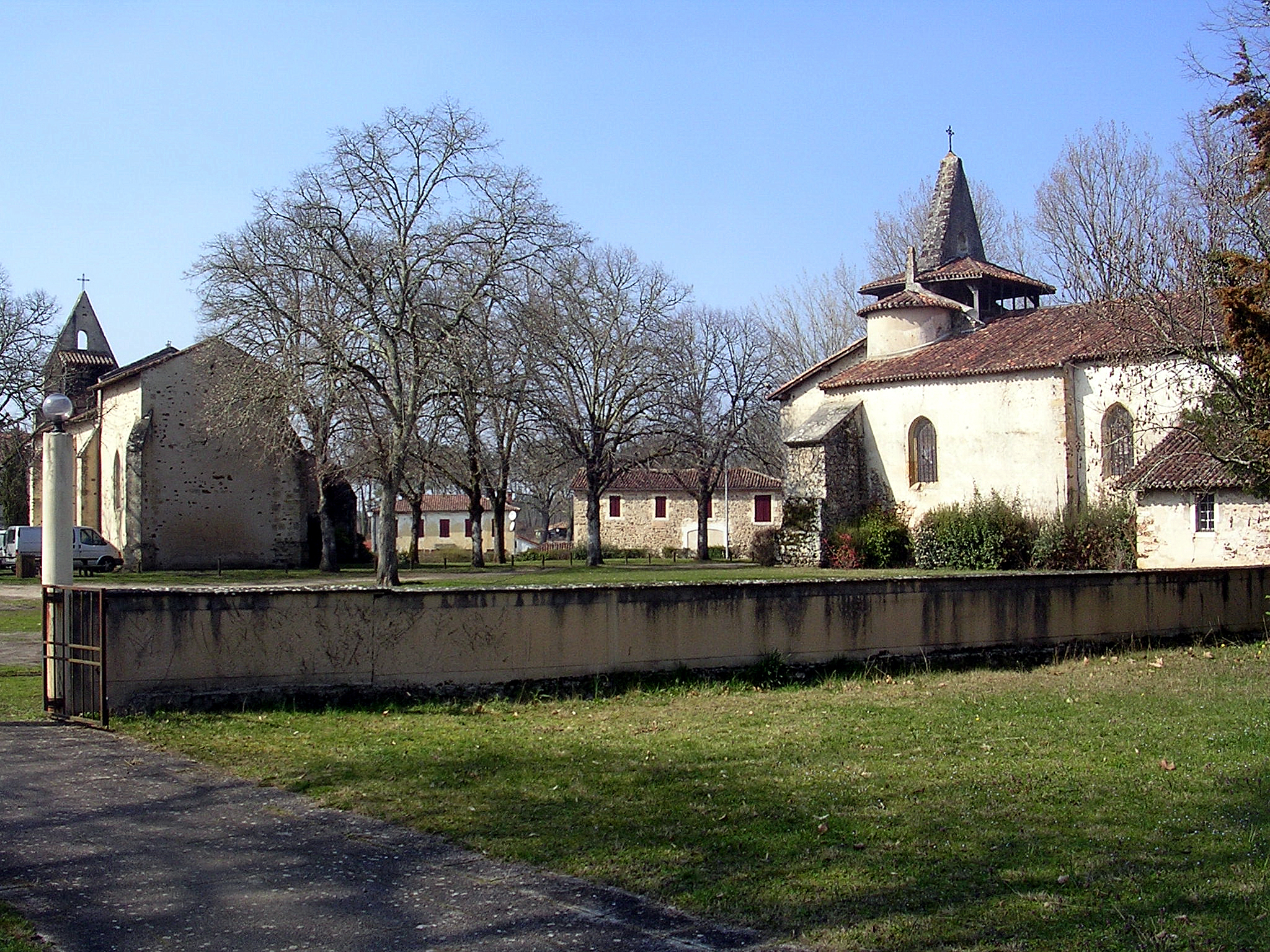
Churches

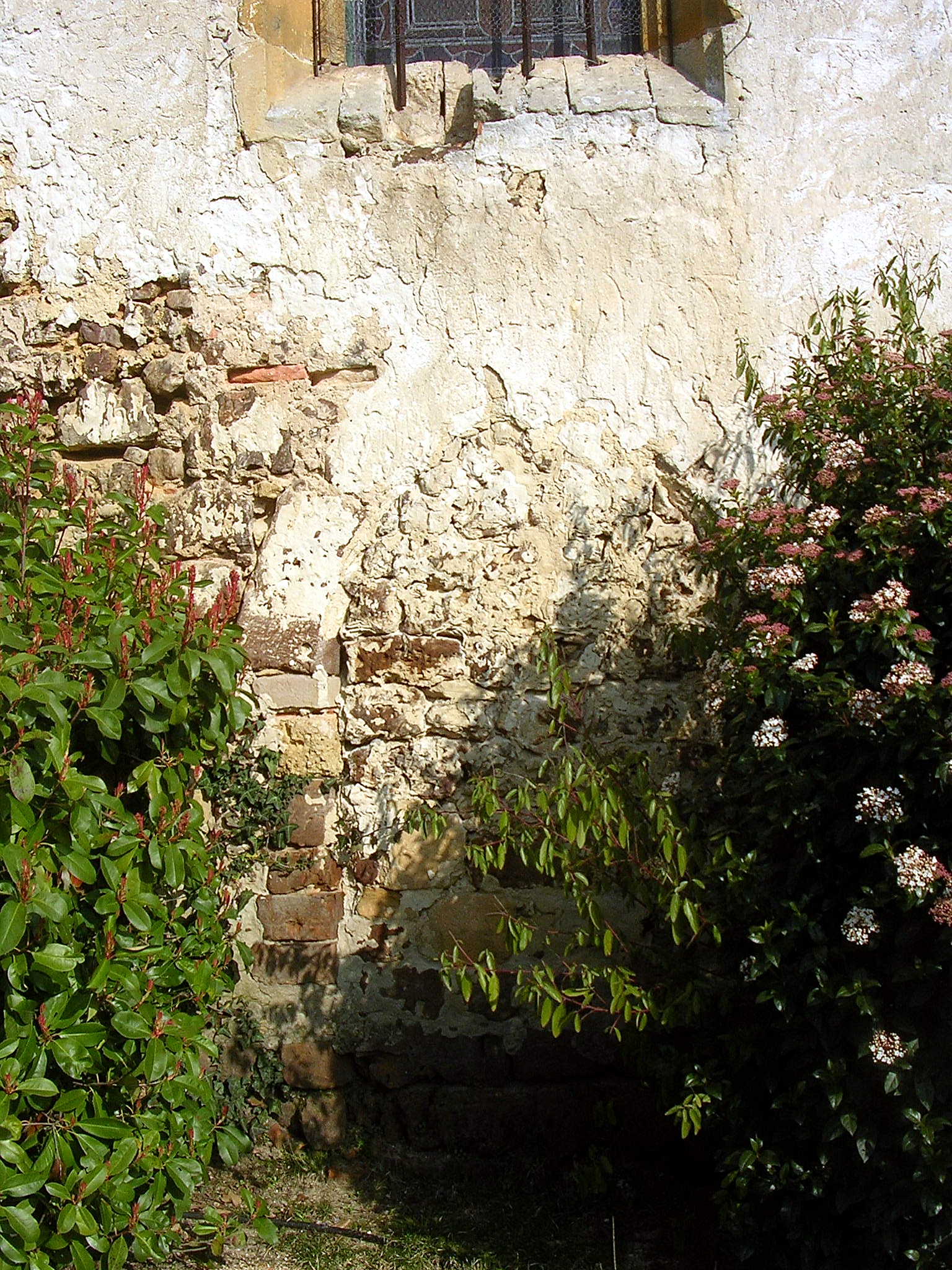
Former door for Cagots in the Church of Saint-Martin de Moustey.

== See also ==
- Communes of the Landes department
- Parc naturel régional des Landes de Gascogne
