= Belhade =

- Commune
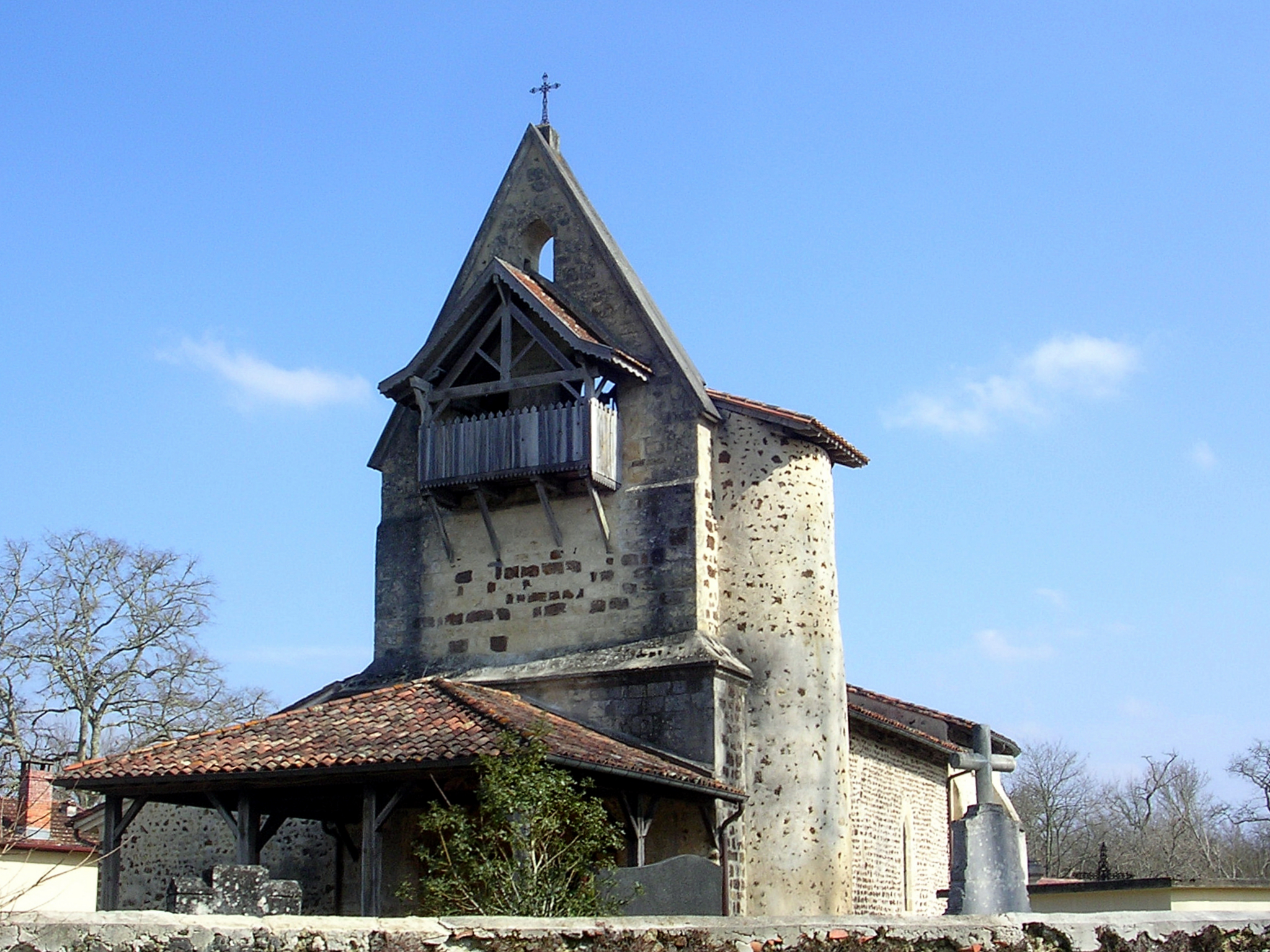
- The church of Belhade
- Location of Belhade
- Location within France Location within Nouvelle-Aquitaine
- Coordinates: 44°22′44″N 0°40′58″W
- Country: France
- Region: Nouvelle-Aquitaine
- Department: Landes
- Arrondissement: Mont-de-Marsan
- Canton: Grands Lacs
- Intercommunality: Cœur Haute Lande

Government
  - Mayor (2020–2026): Jean-Marie Guilhemsans
- Area^{1}: 28.55 km^{2} (11.02 sq mi)
- Elevation: 57 m (187 ft)
- Highest elevation: 65 m (213 ft)
- Lowest elevation: 32 m (105 ft)
- Population (2023): 227
  - Density: 7.95/km^{2} (20.6/sq mi)
- Time zone: UTC+01:00 (CET)
  - Summer (DST): UTC+02:00 (CEST)
- INSEE/Postal code: 40032 /40410
- ^{1} French Land Register data, which excludes lakes, ponds, glaciers > 1 km^{2} (0.386 sq mi or 247 acres) and river estuaries.

Belhade (French pronunciation: [bɛlad]; Gascon: Balehada) is a commune in the Landes department in Nouvelle-Aquitaine in southwestern France.

== Population ==
Historical population
Year	Pop.	±% p.a.
1968	134	—
1975	126	−0.88%
1982	112	−1.67%
1990	101	−1.28%
1999	132	+3.02%
2007	160	+2.43%
2012	200	+4.56%
2017	198	−0.20%
2023	227	+2.30%
Source: INSEE

== See also ==
- Communes of the Landes department
- Parc naturel régional des Landes de Gascogne
