= Sanguinet =

- Commune
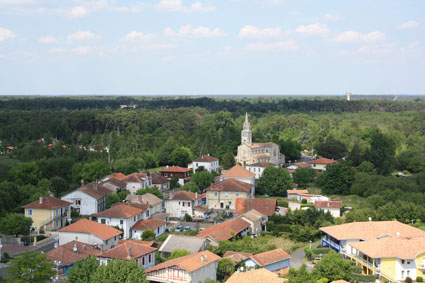
- Location of Sanguinet
- Location within France Location within Nouvelle-Aquitaine
- Coordinates: 44°29′06″N 1°04′23″W
- Country: France
- Region: Nouvelle-Aquitaine
- Department: Landes
- Arrondissement: Mont-de-Marsan
- Canton: Grands Lacs
- Intercommunality: Grands Lacs

Government
  - Mayor (2025–2026): Fabien Lainé
- Area^{1}: 81.43 km^{2} (31.44 sq mi)
- Elevation: 25 m (82 ft)
- Highest elevation: 45 m (148 ft)
- Lowest elevation: 20 m (66 ft)
- Population (2023): 4,741
  - Density: 58.22/km^{2} (150.8/sq mi)
- Time zone: UTC+01:00 (CET)
  - Summer (DST): UTC+02:00 (CEST)
- INSEE/Postal code: 40287 /40460
- ^{1} French Land Register data, which excludes lakes, ponds, glaciers > 1 km^{2} (0.386 sq mi or 247 acres) and river estuaries.

Sanguinet (French pronunciation: [sɑ̃ɡinɛ]; Sanguinet in Occitan) is a commune in the Landes department in Nouvelle-Aquitaine in southwestern France. It is situated next to Étang de Cazaux et de Sanguinet.

== Geography ==
The commune is situated in the north of the department of Landes. The river Gorgue passes through the village and this river is the source of the lake. It would have originally flowed into the Atlantic Ocean, but the mouth of the river was blocked over the centuries by sand dunes on the coast and thus creating the lake and many others along Landes' Atlantic Coast. The lake has covered previous sitings of a town many centuries ago.

== Population ==
Historical population

Year	Pop.	±% p.a.
1793	692	—
1821	879	+0.86%
1846	986	+0.46%
1872	1,204	+0.77%
1901	1,294	+0.25%
1926	1,067	−0.77%
1946	1,052	−0.07%
1962	1,130	+0.45%
1968	1,334	+2.80%

Year	Pop.	±% p.a.
1975	1,364	+0.32%
1982	1,368	+0.04%
1990	1,695	+2.72%
1999	1,982	+1.75%
2007	3,026	+5.43%
2012	3,504	+2.98%
2017	4,185	+3.62%
2023	4,741	+2.10%

Source: EHESS and INSEE (1968-2023)

== Twin Town ==
Sanguinet is twinned with the town of Neyland in Pembrokeshire, Wales.

== See also ==
- Communes of the Landes department
