= Canton of Grands Lacs =

Coordinates: 44.35°N 1.07°W

Grands Lacs
- Canton
- Interactive map of Grands Lacs
- Country: France
- Region: Nouvelle-Aquitaine
- Department: Landes
- No. of communes: {{{nbcomm}}}

Government
  - Representatives (2021–2028): Christophe Labruyere; Hélène Larrezet
- Area: 1,069.74 km^{2} (413.03 sq mi)
- Population (2023): 38,154
  - Density: 35.667/km^{2} (92.376/sq mi)
- INSEE code: 40 07

The canton of Grands Lacs is an administrative division of the Landes department, southwestern France. It was created at the French canton reorganisation which came into effect in March 2015. Its seat is in Parentis-en-Born.

It consists of the following communes:

1. Belhade
2. Biscarrosse
3. Gastes
4. Liposthey
5. Lüe
6. Mano
7. Moustey
8. Parentis-en-Born
9. Pissos
10. Sainte-Eulalie-en-Born
11. Sanguinet
12. Saugnacq-et-Muret
13. Ychoux

== Councillors ==
Election	Councillors	Party	Occupation
2015	Patricia Cassagne	LR	Mayor of Lüe
2015	Alain Dudon	LR	Mayor of Biscarrosse

== Pictures of the canton ==
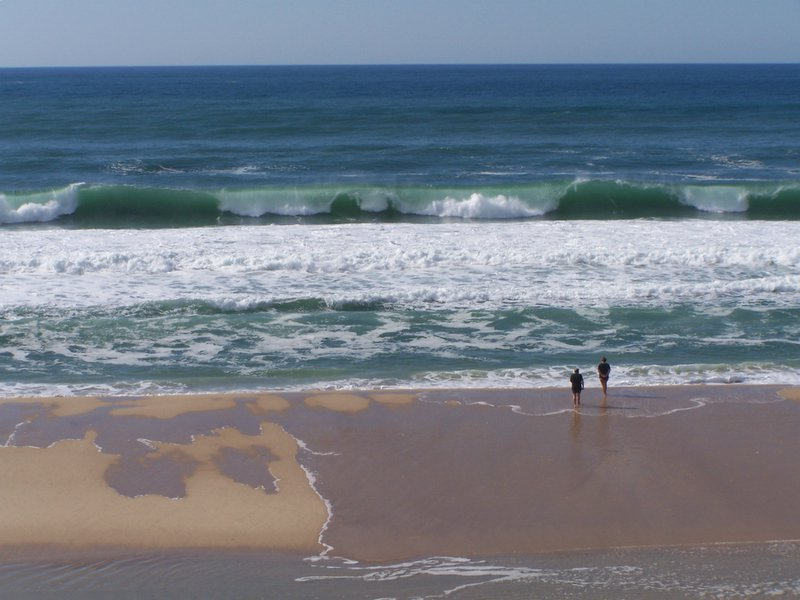
Biscarrosse beach

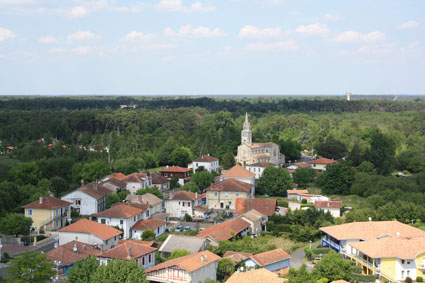
View of Sanguinet

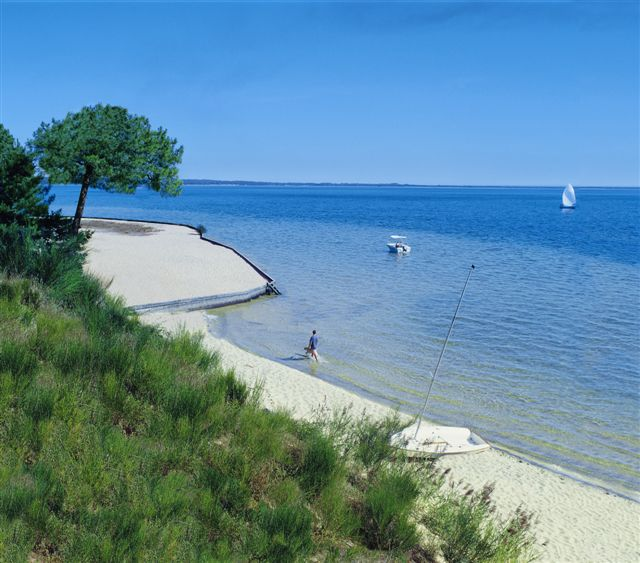
Lac de Biscarrosse et de Parentis
