= Étang de Cazaux et de Sanguinet =

Lake in France

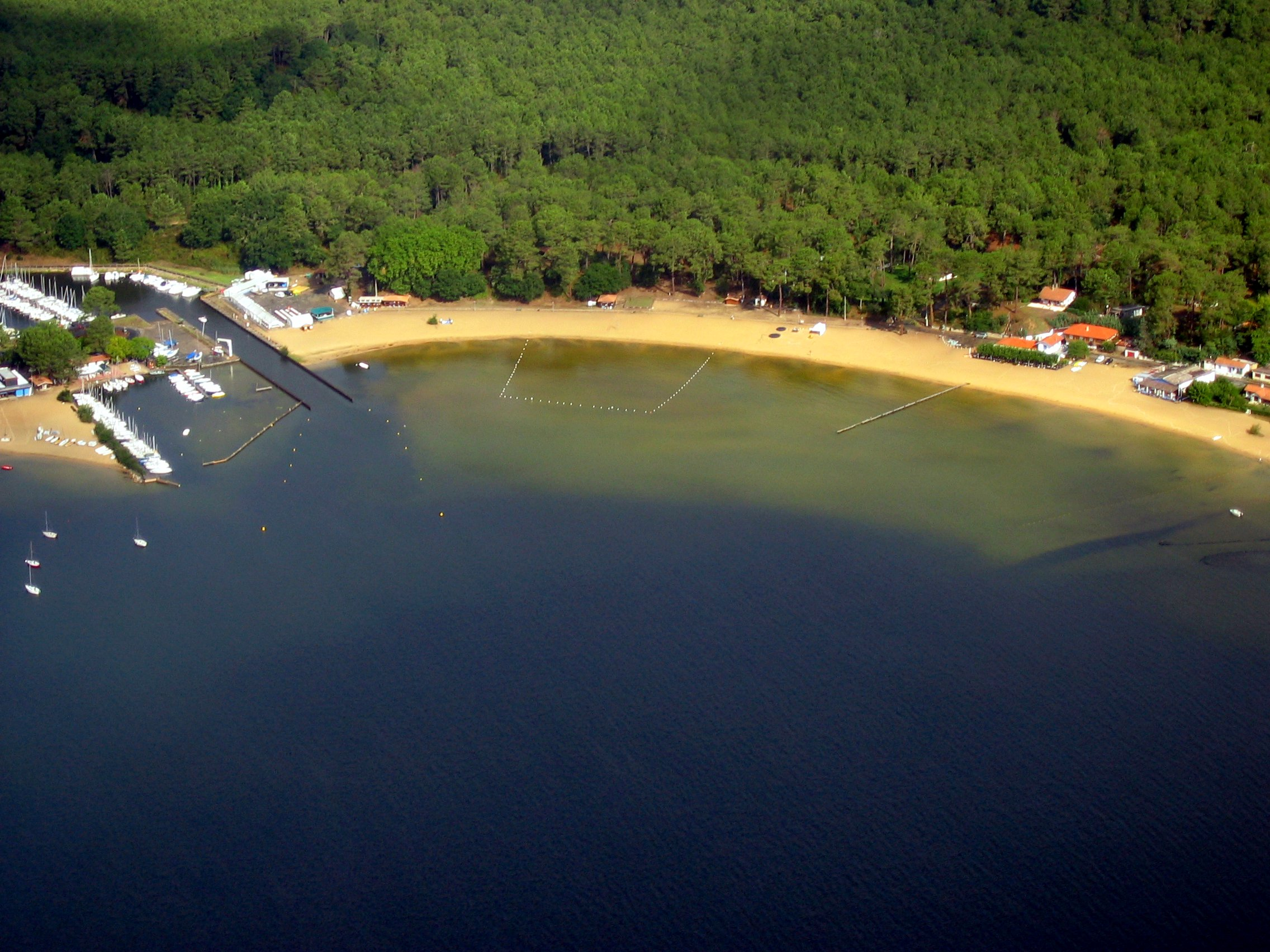

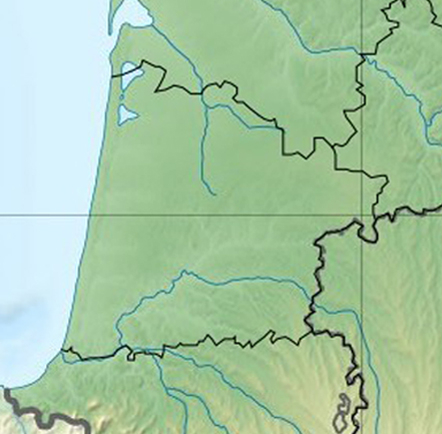
- Location within Landes (department) Location within France
- Location: Gironde, Landes
- Coordinates: 44°29′15″N 1°09′48″W
- Basin countries: France
- Surface area: 55 km^{2} (21 sq mi)
- Max. depth: 23 m (75 ft)
- Surface elevation: 12 m (39 ft)
- Settlements: Cazaux, Sanguinet

Étang de Cazaux et de Sanguinet is a lake in Gironde / Landes, France. At an elevation of 12 m, its surface area is 55 km^{2}.

The lake was formed due to the river Gorgue and the sand dunes on the coast which blocked the river thousands of years ago, leading to the formation of the lake. As the waters rose, it inundated the Roman village of Losa and the villages of Estey du Large and Put Blanc. Artifacts from diving exploration of the lake are on display at a museum in the Place de la Mairie in Sanguinet.

Étang de Cazaux et de Sanguinet is a tourist attraction and features an array of nautical sports.
