= Sainte-Eulalie-en-Born =

- Commune
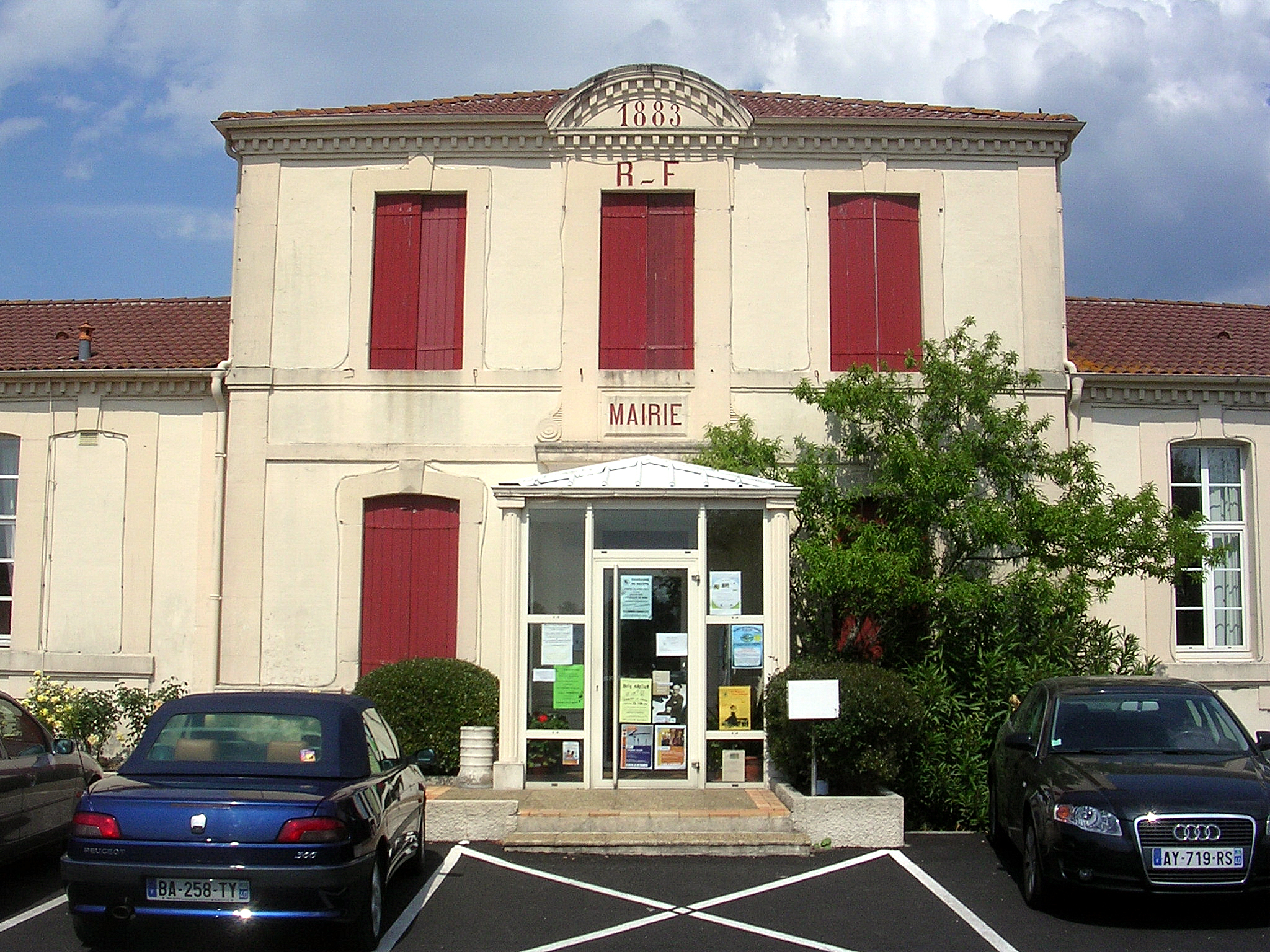
- Town hall
- Location of Sainte-Eulalie-en-Born
- Location within France Location within Nouvelle-Aquitaine
- Coordinates: 44°16′29″N 1°10′54″W
- Country: France
- Region: Nouvelle-Aquitaine
- Department: Landes
- Arrondissement: Mont-de-Marsan
- Canton: Grands Lacs
- Intercommunality: Grands Lacs

Government
  - Mayor (2020–2026): Bernard Comet
- Area^{1}: 70.83 km^{2} (27.35 sq mi)
- Elevation: 26 m (85 ft)
- Highest elevation: 62 m (203 ft)
- Lowest elevation: 2 m (6.6 ft)
- Population (2023): 1,443
  - Density: 20.37/km^{2} (52.77/sq mi)
- Time zone: UTC+01:00 (CET)
  - Summer (DST): UTC+02:00 (CEST)
- INSEE/Postal code: 40257 /40200
- ^{1} French Land Register data, which excludes lakes, ponds, glaciers > 1 km^{2} (0.386 sq mi or 247 acres) and river estuaries.

Sainte-Eulalie-en-Born (French pronunciation: [sɛ̃.t‿ølali ɑ̃ bɔʁn]; Occitan: Senta Aulàdia de Bòrn) is a commune in the Landes department in Nouvelle-Aquitaine in southwestern France.

== Population ==
Historical population
Year	Pop.	±% p.a.
1968	490	—
1975	557	+1.85%
1982	614	+1.40%
1990	773	+2.92%
1999	785	+0.17%
2007	1,017	+3.29%
2012	1,237	+3.99%
2017	1,265	+0.45%
2023	1,443	+2.22%
Source: INSEE

== See also ==
- Communes of the Landes department
