= Biscarrosse – Parentis Airport =

Biscarrosse - Parentis Airport Aérodrome de Biscarrosse - Parentis
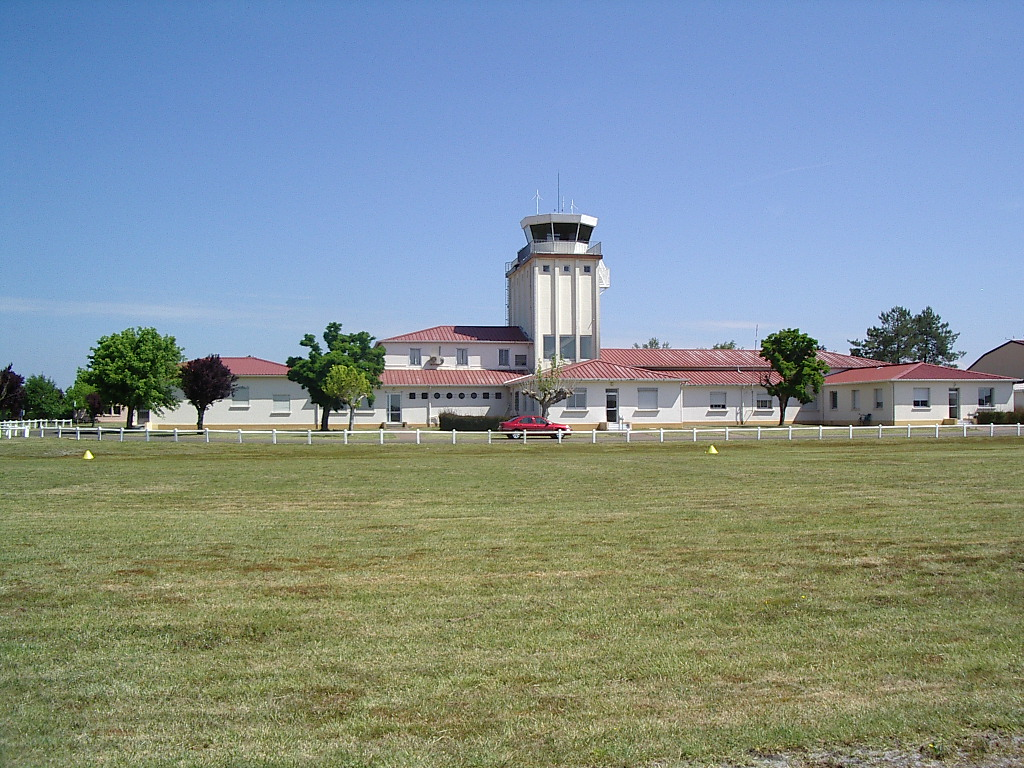
- IATA: none; ICAO: LFBS

Summary
- Airport type: Public
- Serves: Biscarrosse, France
- Location: Parentis-en-Born, France
- Elevation AMSL: 100 ft / 30 m
- Coordinates: 44°22′5″N 1°7′56″W

Map
- Location of airport in France

Runways
Direction	Length		Surface
Direction	ft	m	Surface
09/27	2,624	800	Asphalt
12/30	4,265	1,300	Grass
14/32	2,296	700	Grass
- Source: French AIP

Biscarrosse – Parentis Airport (ICAO code: LFBS) is located at Parentis-en-Born in Landes département of Nouvelle-Aquitaine region at 3,5 km south-east of Biscarrosse.

A campus of the École nationale de l'aviation civile (French civil aviation university) is located on the aerodrome.

== Facilities ==
The airport has three runways:

- 09/27, surfaced with asphalt, 800 metres (875 yd) long and 20 metres (66 ft) wide
- a grass runway also designated 09/27 and used only for glider operations, 1,300 metres (1,422 yd) long and 60 metres (197 ft) wide
- 14/32, also grass, 700 metres (766 yd) long and 60 metres (197 ft) wide

== See also ==
- List of airports in France
- Flying club
- Directorate General for Civil Aviation (France)
