= Mano, Landes =

Mano
- Commune
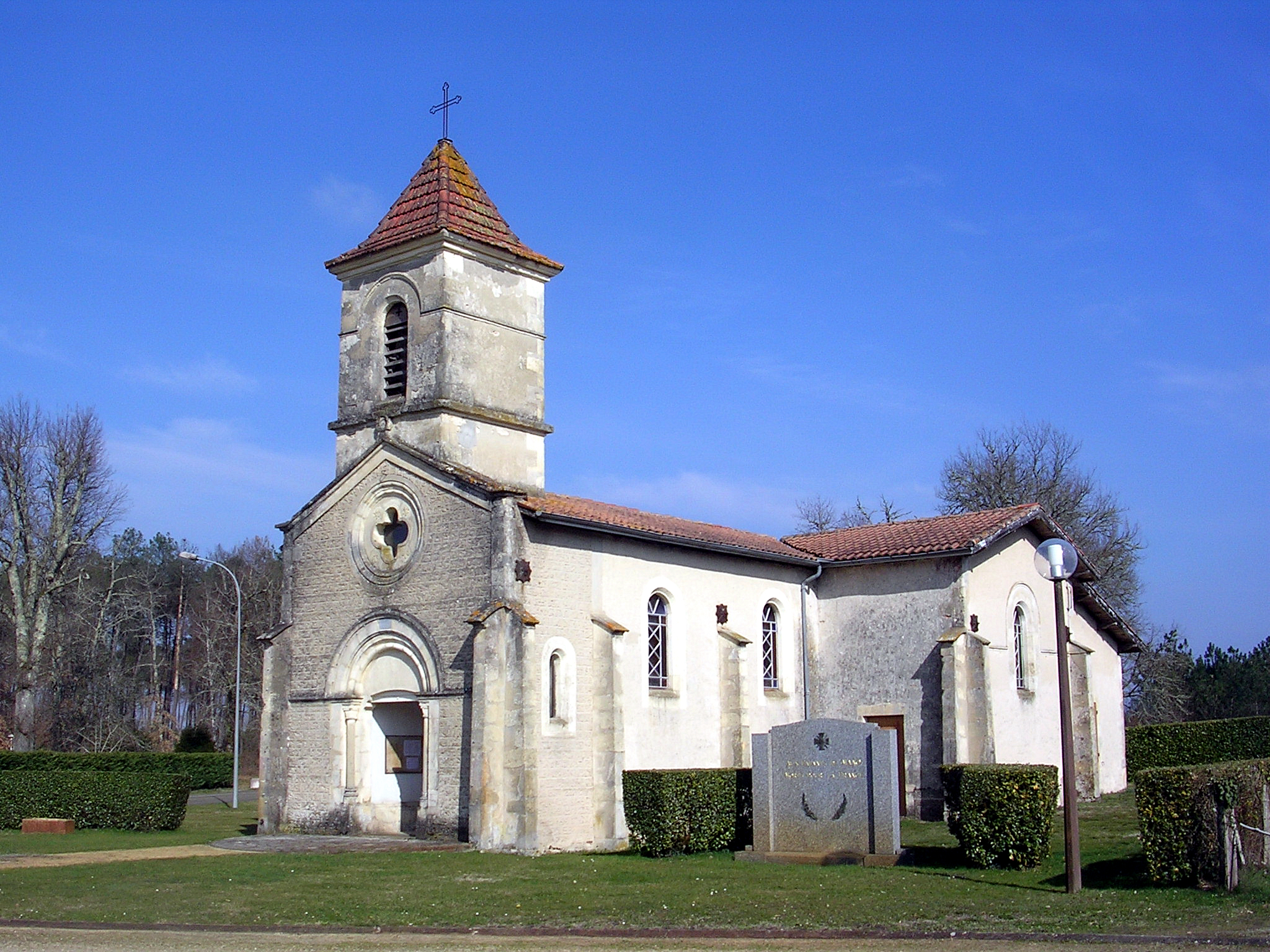
- Church at Mano
- Location of Mano
- Location within France Location within Nouvelle-Aquitaine
- Coordinates: 44°25′05″N 0°40′15″W
- Country: France
- Region: Nouvelle-Aquitaine
- Department: Landes
- Arrondissement: Mont-de-Marsan
- Canton: Grands Lacs
- Intercommunality: Cœur Haute Lande

Government
  - Mayor (2020–2026): Joëlle Boulanger-Banet
- Area^{1}: 32.27 km^{2} (12.46 sq mi)
- Elevation: 63 m (207 ft)
- Highest elevation: 74 m (243 ft)
- Lowest elevation: 38 m (125 ft)
- Population (2023): 149
  - Density: 4.62/km^{2} (12.0/sq mi)
- Time zone: UTC+01:00 (CET)
  - Summer (DST): UTC+02:00 (CEST)
- INSEE/Postal code: 40171 /40410
- ^{1} French Land Register data, which excludes lakes, ponds, glaciers > 1 km^{2} (0.386 sq mi or 247 acres) and river estuaries.

Mano (French pronunciation: [mano]; Occitan: Manòr) is a commune in the Landes department in Nouvelle-Aquitaine in south-western France.

== See also ==
- Communes of the Landes department
- Parc naturel régional des Landes de Gascogne
