= Lüe =

- Commune
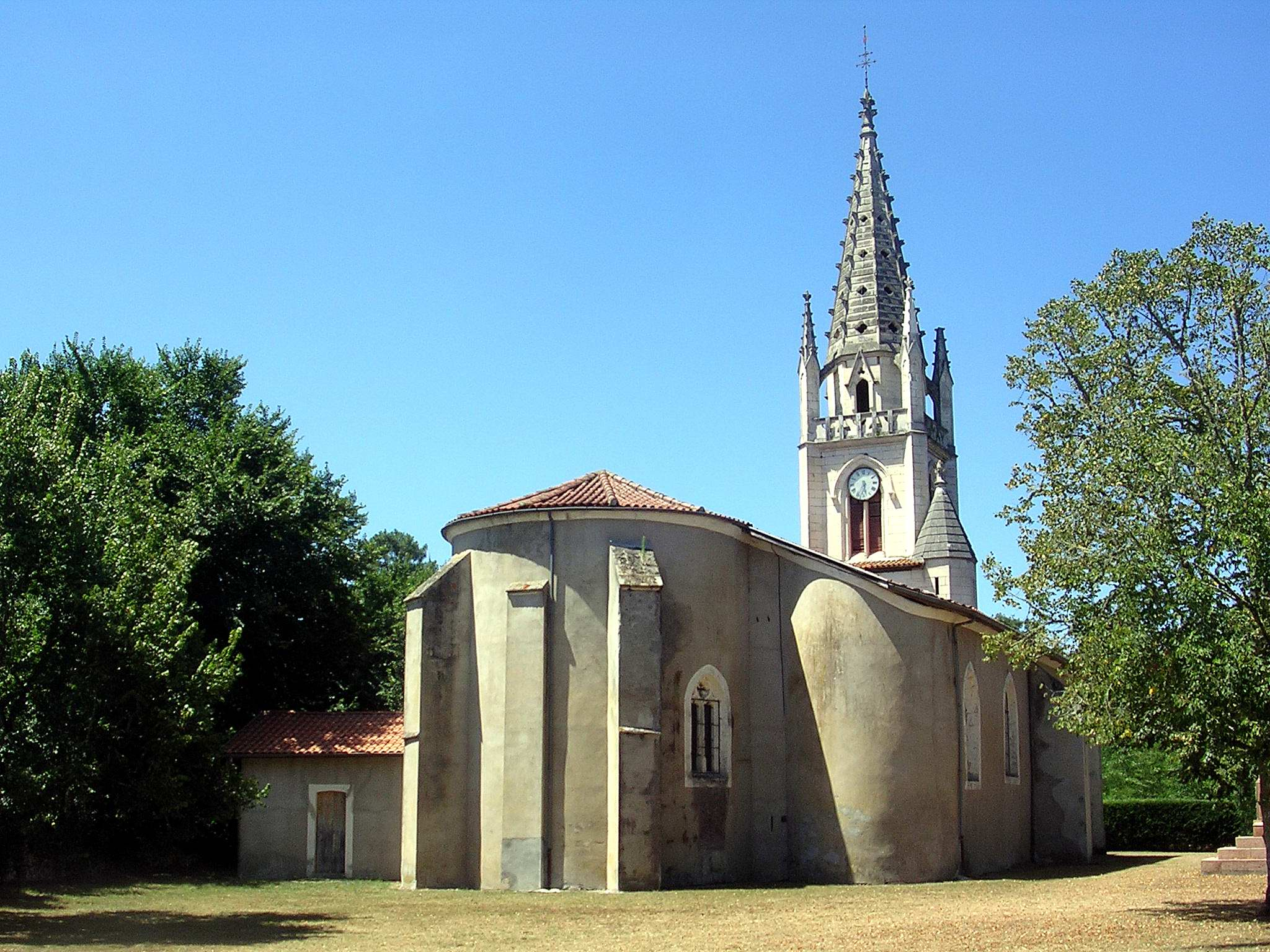
- The church in Lüe
- Location of Lüe
- Location within France Location within Nouvelle-Aquitaine
- Coordinates: 44°13′55″N 0°58′59″W
- Country: France
- Region: Nouvelle-Aquitaine
- Department: Landes
- Arrondissement: Mont-de-Marsan
- Canton: Grands Lacs

Government
  - Mayor (2020–2026): Patricia Cassagne
- Area^{1}: 96.72 km^{2} (37.34 sq mi)
- Elevation: 45 m (148 ft)
- Highest elevation: 80 m (260 ft)
- Lowest elevation: 33 m (108 ft)
- Population (2023): 621
  - Density: 6.42/km^{2} (16.6/sq mi)
- Time zone: UTC+01:00 (CET)
  - Summer (DST): UTC+02:00 (CEST)
- INSEE/Postal code: 40163 /40210
- ^{1} French Land Register data, which excludes lakes, ponds, glaciers > 1 km^{2} (0.386 sq mi or 247 acres) and river estuaries.

Lüe (French pronunciation: [ly]; Occitan: Lua) is a commune in the Landes department in Nouvelle-Aquitaine in south-western France.

== See also ==
- Communes of the Landes department
