= Bretonne Pie Noir =

French breed of cattle

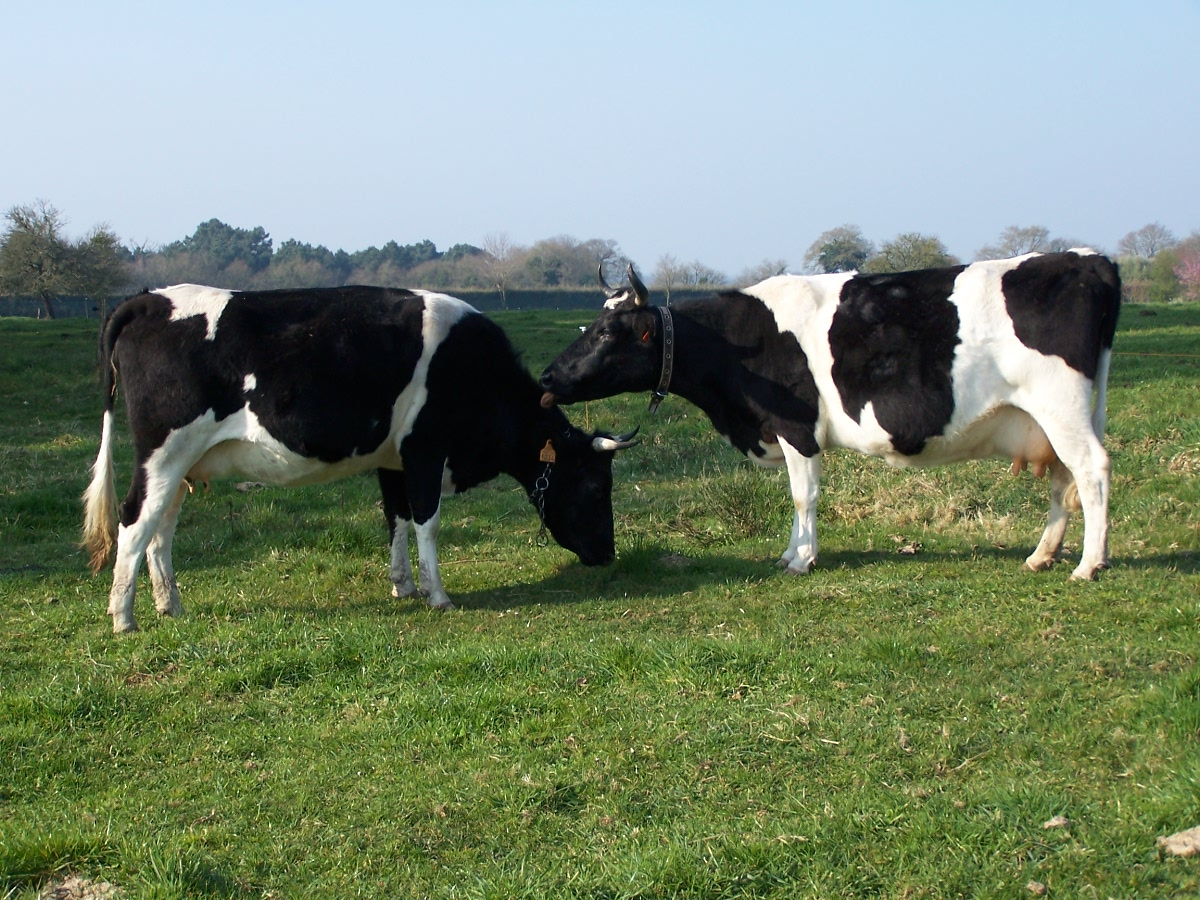
- Conservation status: FAO (2007): not listed; DAD-IS (2025): at risk/endangered
- Other names: Morbihan; Bretonne Pie Noire; Bretonne Pie-Noir; Bretonne Pie-Noire
- Country of origin: France
- Distribution: Brittany
- Use: dairy

Traits
- Weight: Male: 600 kg; Female: 450 kg
- Height: Male: 123 cm; Female: 117 cm
- Coat: pied black and white
- Horn status: horned

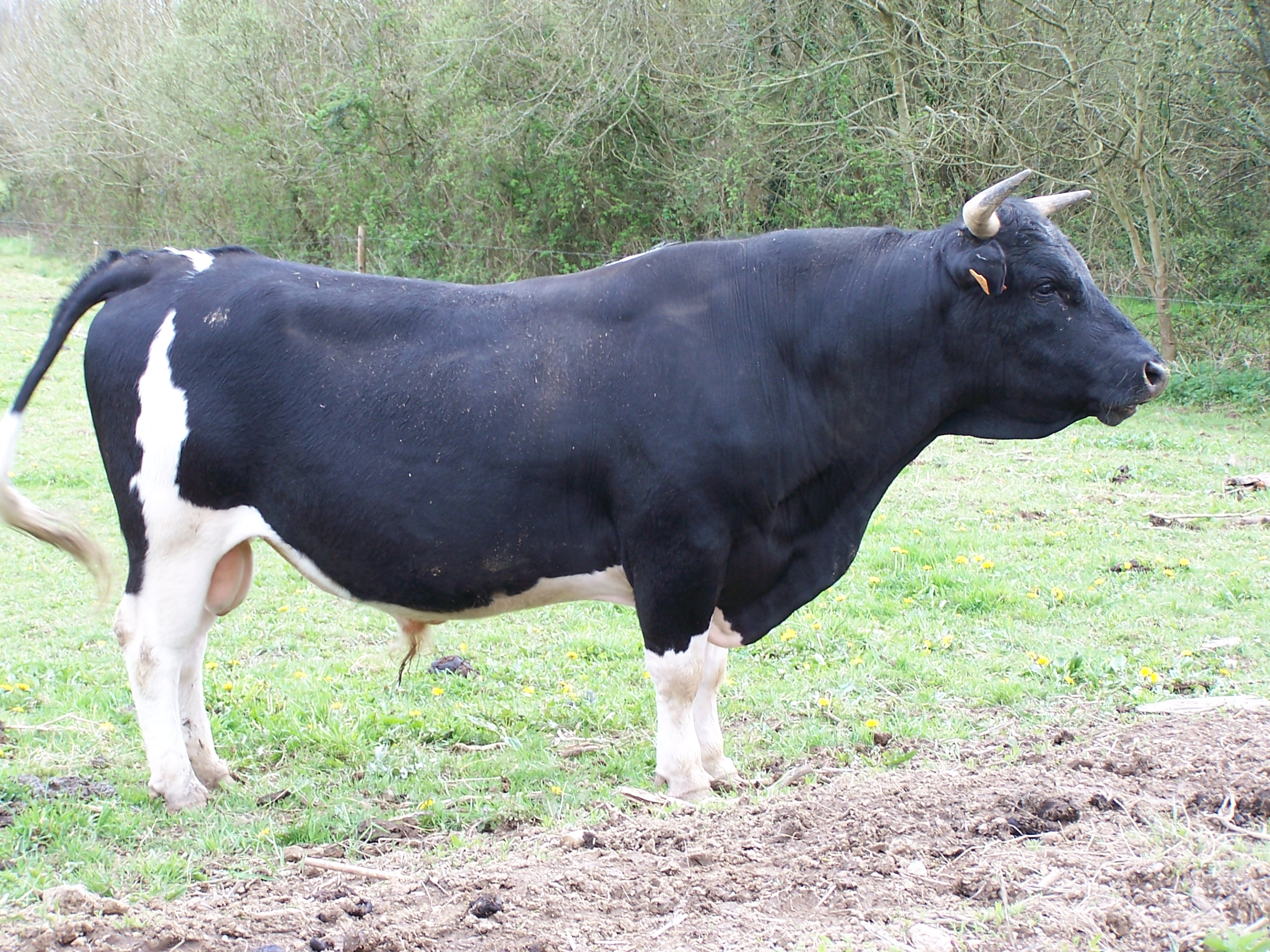
An atypically dark bull

The Bretonne Pie Noir is a French breed of small dairy cattle from Brittany, in north-western France. It originates from Cornouaille and the Pays de Vannes in the départements of Finistère and Morbihan. Due to its small size, modest requirements, good productivity and ability to exploit poor and marginal terrain, it was well suited to traditional Breton agriculture. A herdbook was established in 1886. The breed was in the past numerous; at the beginning of the twentieth century there were about 500000. Numbers fell drastically during that century, and in 1976, when about 15000 remained, a breed conservation plan was begun, the first such for any breed of cattle.

== Characteristics ==
The Bretonne Pie Noir is pied black and white; a red pied variant disappeared during the twentieth century. Height at the withers averages 123 cm for males, 117 cm for females; average weight is 600 kg for bulls, 450 kg for cows.

== Use ==
The milk yield of the Bretonne Pie Noir is about 3500 kg per lactation. The milk has 4.4% fat and 3.4% protein. Some is used to make gwell, a traditional Breton fermented milk product.
