= Parentis-en-Born =

- Commune
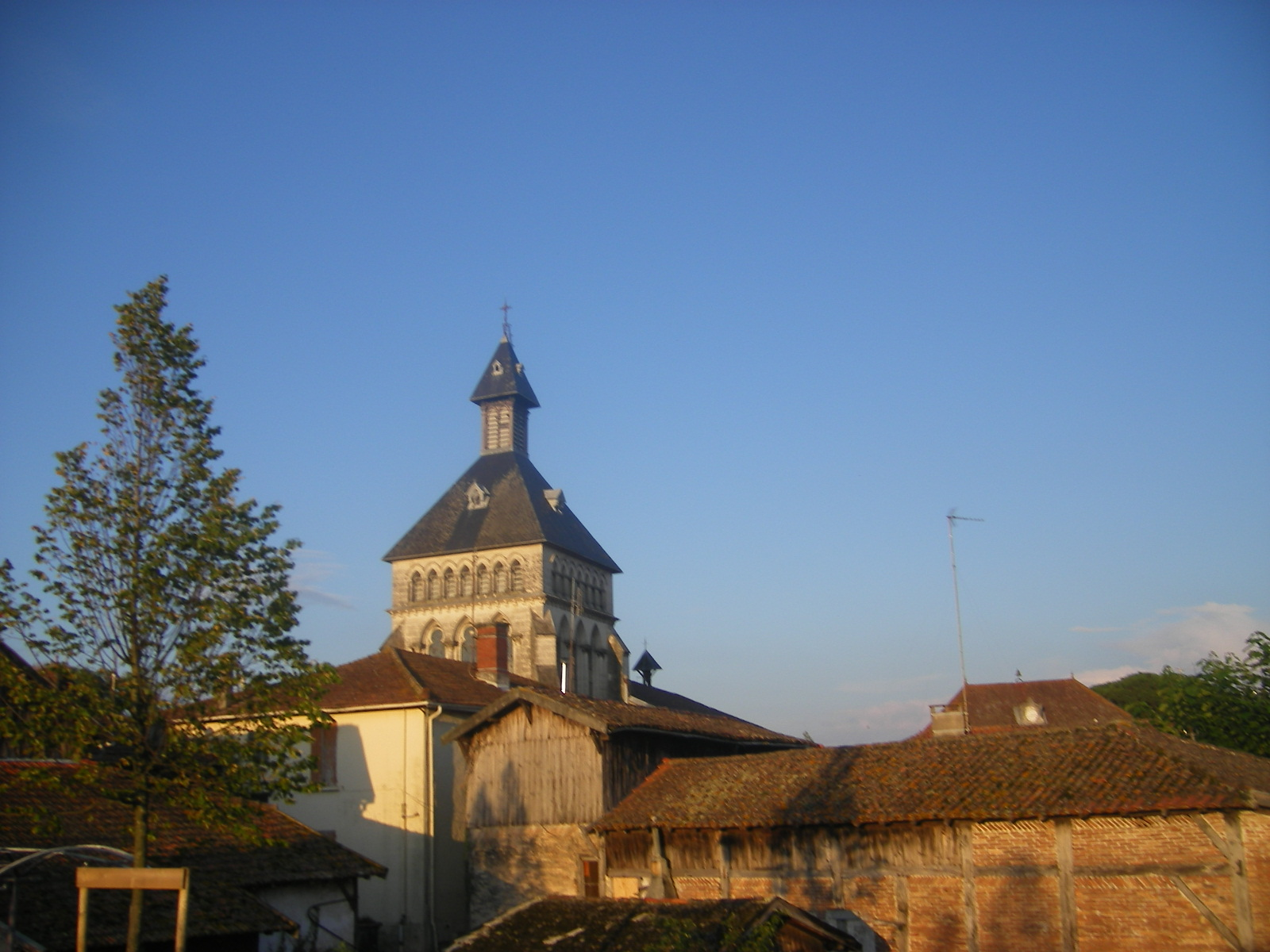

- Coat of arms
- Location of Parentis-en-Born
- Location within France Location within Nouvelle-Aquitaine
- Coordinates: 44°21′00″N 1°04′24″W
- Country: France
- Region: Nouvelle-Aquitaine
- Department: Landes
- Arrondissement: Mont-de-Marsan
- Canton: Grands Lacs
- Intercommunality: Grands Lacs

Government
  - Mayor (2020–2026): Marie-Françoise Nadau
- Area^{1}: 111.55 km^{2} (43.07 sq mi)
- Elevation: 32 m (105 ft)
- Highest elevation: 57 m (187 ft)
- Lowest elevation: 20 m (66 ft)
- Population (2023): 7,586
  - Density: 68.01/km^{2} (176.1/sq mi)
- Time zone: UTC+01:00 (CET)
  - Summer (DST): UTC+02:00 (CEST)
- INSEE/Postal code: 40217 /40160
- ^{1} French Land Register data, which excludes lakes, ponds, glaciers > 1 km^{2} (0.386 sq mi or 247 acres) and river estuaries.

Parentis-en-Born (French pronunciation: [paʁɑ̃tis ɑ̃ bɔʁn]; Occitan: Parentís) is a commune in the Landes department in Nouvelle-Aquitaine in southwestern France.

It has one of the biggest oil reserves of continental western Europe. The Biscarrosse – Parentis Airport is located in the commune.

== Population ==
Historical population

Year	Pop.	±% p.a.
1793	1,453	—
1800	1,440	−0.13%
1806	1,181	−3.25%
1821	1,604	+2.06%
1831	1,735	+0.79%
1836	1,740	+0.06%
1841	1,788	+0.55%
1846	1,918	+1.41%
1851	1,946	+0.29%
1856	2,030	+0.85%
1861	2,049	+0.19%
1866	2,028	−0.21%
1872	1,966	−0.52%
1876	1,921	−0.58%
1881	1,814	−1.14%
1886	1,930	+1.25%
1891	1,941	+0.11%
1896	1,964	+0.24%
1901	2,075	+1.11%

Year	Pop.	±% p.a.
1906	2,147	+0.68%
1911	2,165	+0.17%
1921	1,948	−1.05%
1926	1,908	−0.41%
1931	1,824	−0.90%
1936	1,785	−0.43%
1946	1,855	+0.39%
1954	2,159	+1.92%
1962	2,490	+1.80%
1968	3,769	+7.15%
1975	4,036	+0.98%
1982	4,076	+0.14%
1990	4,056	−0.06%
1999	4,429	+0.98%
2007	4,951	+1.40%
2012	5,513	+2.17%
2017	6,236	+2.50%
2023	7,586	+3.32%

Source: EHESS and INSEE (1968-2023)

== See also ==
- Communes of the Landes department
- Lac de Biscarrosse et de Parentis
