= Biscarrosse =

- Commune
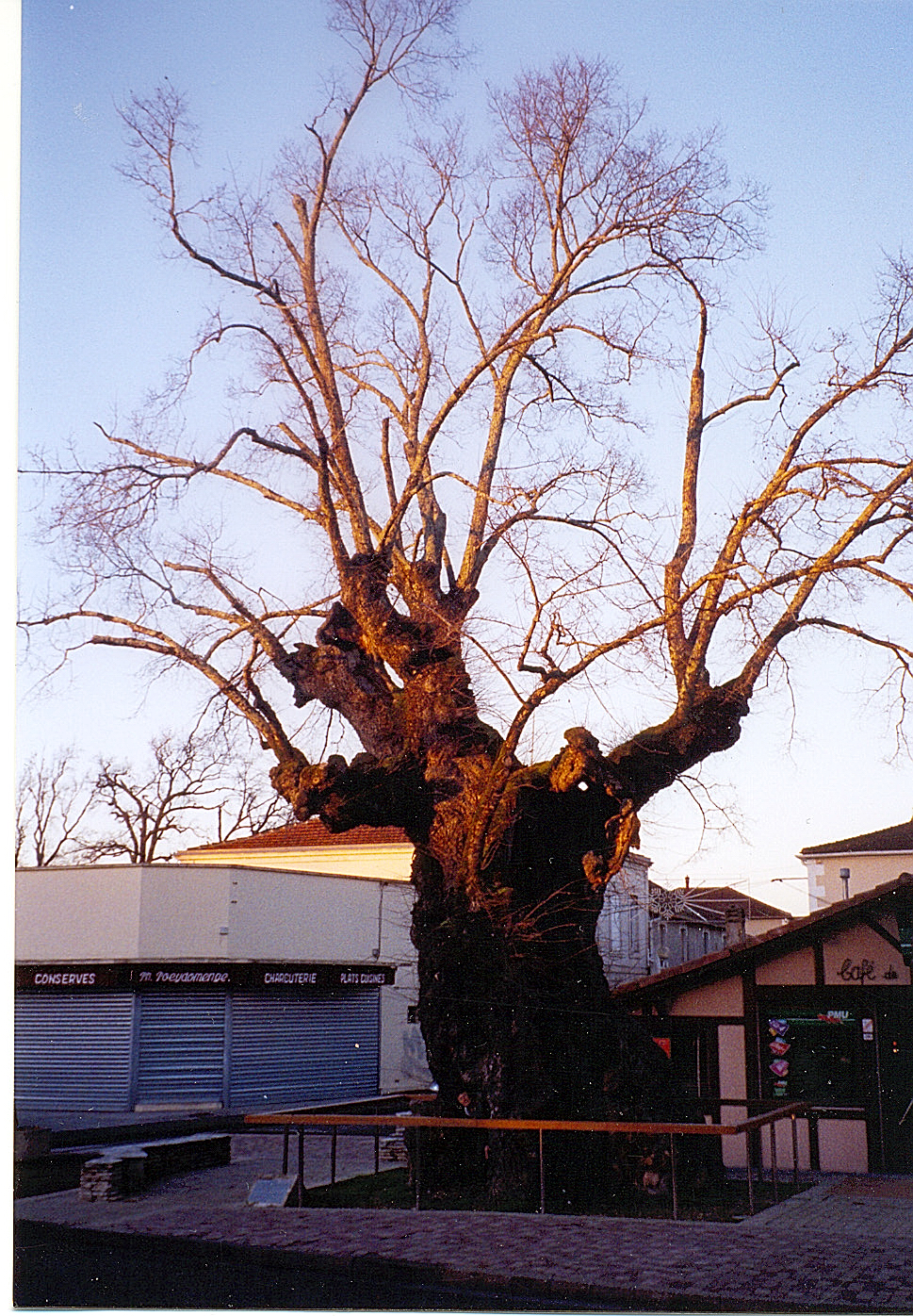
- Biscarrosse elm in January; died 2010.

- Coat of arms
- Location of Biscarrosse
- Location within France Location within Nouvelle-Aquitaine
- Coordinates: 44°23′39″N 1°09′46″W
- Country: France
- Region: Nouvelle-Aquitaine
- Department: Landes
- Arrondissement: Mont-de-Marsan
- Canton: Grands Lacs
- Intercommunality: Grands Lacs

Government
  - Mayor (2020–2026): Hélène Larrezet
- Area^{1}: 160.48 km^{2} (61.96 sq mi)
- Elevation: 26 m (85 ft)
- Highest elevation: 78 m (256 ft)
- Lowest elevation: 0 m (0 ft)
- Population (2023): 15,836
  - Density: 98.679/km^{2} (255.58/sq mi)
- Time zone: UTC+01:00 (CET)
  - Summer (DST): UTC+02:00 (CEST)
- INSEE/Postal code: 40046 /40600
- ^{1} French Land Register data, which excludes lakes, ponds, glaciers > 1 km^{2} (0.386 sq mi or 247 acres) and river estuaries.

Biscarrosse (French pronunciation: [biskaʁɔs]; Occitan: Biscarròssa) is a commune in the Landes department in Nouvelle-Aquitaine in southwestern France. It is located 65 km (40 mi) southwest of Bordeaux, and 10 km (6.2 mi) inland from the seaside resort of Biscarrosse-Plage on the Atlantic coast.

Near Biscarrosse is the CEL (national test centre) from which numerous French military rockets have been launched for test purposes. Likewise, the CEL has facilities for launching civilian rockets to study the upper atmosphere.

Near the town centre, outside the Café de l'orme, there was what is believed to have been the oldest elm tree in Europe. Planted in 1350, this field elm Ulmus minor died in 2010 after finally succumbing to Dutch elm disease. Legend has it that girls deemed promiscuous were forced to stand naked upon a barrel beneath the tree for a day. One unfortunate, unjustly accused, died of shame, the tree annually producing a corona of blanched leaves in her memory.

The commune has an airport, called Biscarrosse - Parentis Airport.

== Etymology ==
The toponym Biscarrosse derives from the Aquitanian language or directly from the Basque word bizkar, meaning 'low ridge' or 'prominence' followed by the Aquitanian suffix -ossum/-os, that was used to mark presence. Related toponyms are Biscay and Biscarrués.

== Climate ==
Climate data for Biscarrosse (1991–2020 averages)
Month	Jan	Feb	Mar	Apr	May	Jun	Jul	Aug	Sep	Oct	Nov	Dec	Year
Record high °C (°F)	23.0 (73.4)	24.8 (76.6)	27.7 (81.9)	30.8 (87.4)	35.1 (95.2)	41.7 (107.1)	42.6 (108.7)	41.1 (106.0)	37.4 (99.3)	34.5 (94.1)	27.7 (81.9)	24.2 (75.6)	42.6 (108.7)
Mean daily maximum °C (°F)	11.4 (52.5)	12.4 (54.3)	15.1 (59.2)	16.9 (62.4)	20.3 (68.5)	23.1 (73.6)	25.0 (77.0)	25.6 (78.1)	23.5 (74.3)	19.9 (67.8)	15.0 (59.0)	12.0 (53.6)	18.4 (65.1)
Daily mean °C (°F)	8.2 (46.8)	8.7 (47.7)	11.1 (52.0)	13.0 (55.4)	16.3 (61.3)	19.2 (66.6)	21.2 (70.2)	21.5 (70.7)	19.2 (66.6)	16.1 (61.0)	11.6 (52.9)	8.9 (48.0)	14.6 (58.3)
Mean daily minimum °C (°F)	5.0 (41.0)	5.0 (41.0)	7.1 (44.8)	9.1 (48.4)	12.4 (54.3)	15.3 (59.5)	17.4 (63.3)	17.5 (63.5)	14.9 (58.8)	12.3 (54.1)	8.2 (46.8)	5.8 (42.4)	10.8 (51.4)
Record low °C (°F)	−13.6 (7.5)	−7.8 (18.0)	−7.0 (19.4)	−0.6 (30.9)	2.9 (37.2)	5.2 (41.4)	8.1 (46.6)	9.2 (48.6)	5.8 (42.4)	−0.2 (31.6)	−3.6 (25.5)	−8.4 (16.9)	−13.6 (7.5)
Average precipitation mm (inches)	86.6 (3.41)	64.5 (2.54)	57.9 (2.28)	65.7 (2.59)	64.0 (2.52)	61.2 (2.41)	40.8 (1.61)	56.4 (2.22)	72.7 (2.86)	77.9 (3.07)	115.2 (4.54)	88.6 (3.49)	851.5 (33.52)
Average precipitation days (≥ 1.0 mm)	12.6	10.4	10.7	10.7	9.4	7.5	7.0	7.5	9.1	10.7	13.2	12.5	121.3
Mean monthly sunshine hours	96.7	119.7	179.8	197.7	231.5	243.0	260.7	252.2	212.4	150.4	104.4	88.7	2,137.2
Source: Meteociel

== Population ==
Historical population
Year	Pop.	±% p.a.
1968	7,159	—
1975	8,058	+1.70%
1982	8,065	+0.01%
1990	9,054	+1.46%
1999	9,281	+0.28%
2007	12,209	+3.49%
2012	13,391	+1.87%
2017	14,182	+1.15%
2023	15,836	+1.86%
Source: INSEE

== Seaplane activity ==
Nearby Hourtiquet once hosted an important seaplane base, serving the builder Latécoère and airlines Aéropostale and its successor Air France. A seaplane museum exists at the shores of the Lac de Biscarrosse et de Parentis.

During World War II the base served German military seaplanes; two Dornier 24 flying boats were recovered from the lake in 1980 and 1981.

Since 1991, the lake has seen bi-annual seaplane fly-ins.

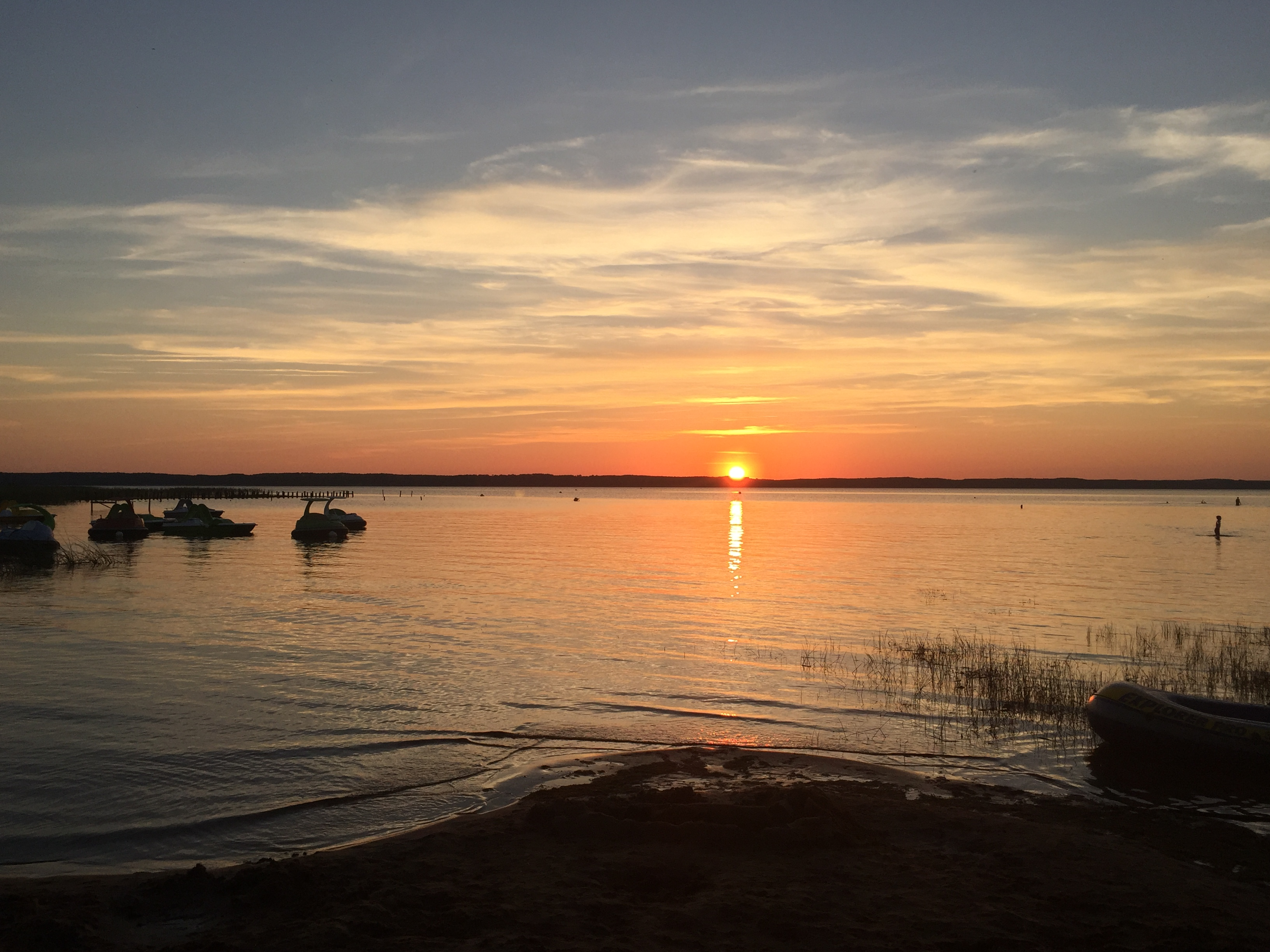
Lake Biscarrosse

== Oil exploration ==
After the demise of seaplanes after World War II, the lake gained new interest at the discovery of petroleum. It has the greatest reserve in France. Petroleum exploitation is situated on the shores of the lake, in the commune of Parentis.

== Education ==
- École nationale de l'aviation civile
