= Double-muscled cattle =

Breeds of cattle with mutations that result in enhanced muscle growth

Double-muscled cattle are breeds of cattle that carry one of seven known mutations that limits and reduces the activity of the myostatin protein. Normally, myostatin limits the number of muscle fibers present at birth, and interfering with activity of this protein causes animals to be born with higher numbers of muscle fibers, consequently augmenting muscle growth. Additionally, these mutations reduce the superficial and internal fat deposits, causing the meat to be less marbled and lower in fat content. Animals homozygous for myostatin mutation (inheriting a mutant copy of myostatin from both sire and dam) also have improved meat tenderness in some cuts of meat. The enlarged muscles of dam and calf at birth leads to increased difficulty of calving, and in some breeds frequently necessitates birth by cesarean section.

Double-muscling historically has also been known as myofibre hyperplasia, doppellender, muscular hypertrophy, a groppa doppia, and culard.

== History ==
Double muscling in cattle is caused by mutations affecting the myostatin gene, which normally regulates skeletal muscle growth. Animals with disrupted myostatin function develop significantly increased muscle mass, resulting in higher lean meat yields.

Naturally occurring double muscling has been identified in several cattle breeds. The Piedmontese breed, first documented in Italy in 1897, and the Parthenaise, identified in France in 1893, both carry myostatin mutations associated with hypermuscularity. Another well-known example is the Belgian Blue, which originated in central and upper Belgium and was established as a distinct breed in the early 20th century. Historically, Belgian Blue cattle were divided into beef and dairy strains, but modern breeding has focused almost exclusively on beef production. Although relatively recent in the United States, the breed has gained acceptance among cattle producers.

The molecular basis of double muscling was clarified in 1997 with the discovery of myostatin by Se-Jin Lee and Alexandra McPherron. Their research demonstrated that mice lacking functional myostatin developed muscle mass two to three times greater than that of normal mice. Later that year, Lee and McPherron identified naturally occurring disruptions of the myostatin locus in Piedmontese and Belgian Blue cattle, confirming the genetic basis of hypermuscularity in these breeds. Subsequent research by Lee showed that myostatin deficiency was also associated with reduced white fat deposition and that excessive myostatin activity could induce a phenotype resembling cachexia. He further demonstrated that additional molecules within the transforming growth factor beta (TGF-β) signalling pathway, including activins and follistatin, also play important roles in the regulation of skeletal muscle mass.

These findings prompted interest in myostatin as a potential therapeutic target. Although no definitive clinical applications have yet been established, myostatin inhibition has been investigated for possible benefits in conditions characterised by muscle wasting, including muscular dystrophy, cancer and chronic kidney disease.

Selective breeding for double muscling has been pursued primarily to increase meat yield and reduce fat content. Double-muscled cattle generally exhibit reduced backfat thickness and higher carcass yields compared with normally muscled animals. Meat from double-muscled cattle is also typically more tender. However, the condition is associated with husbandry challenges, including increased calving difficulties and specific management requirements. As a result, the use of double-muscled genetics remains a balance between production efficiency and animal welfare considerations within the meat industry.

== Negative effects ==
Scientific studies have found that calving ease and birth weight can in some cases be negatively impacted where both parents carry the double-muscling genes, leading to difficulty of calving and in some breeds a ~20% increased likelihood of birth by Caesarean section being required.

Affected breeds include:

- Belgian Blue
- Piedmontese
- Parthenais
- Maine-Anjou
- Limousin

In contrast, no such negative effects were noted among Charolais cattle even where both parents carried the double-muscling gene, although in this breed a different mutation (Q204X) is responsible.

== See also ==
- Myostatin
- Cattle
