= Limousin cattle =

French breed of cattle

Limousin
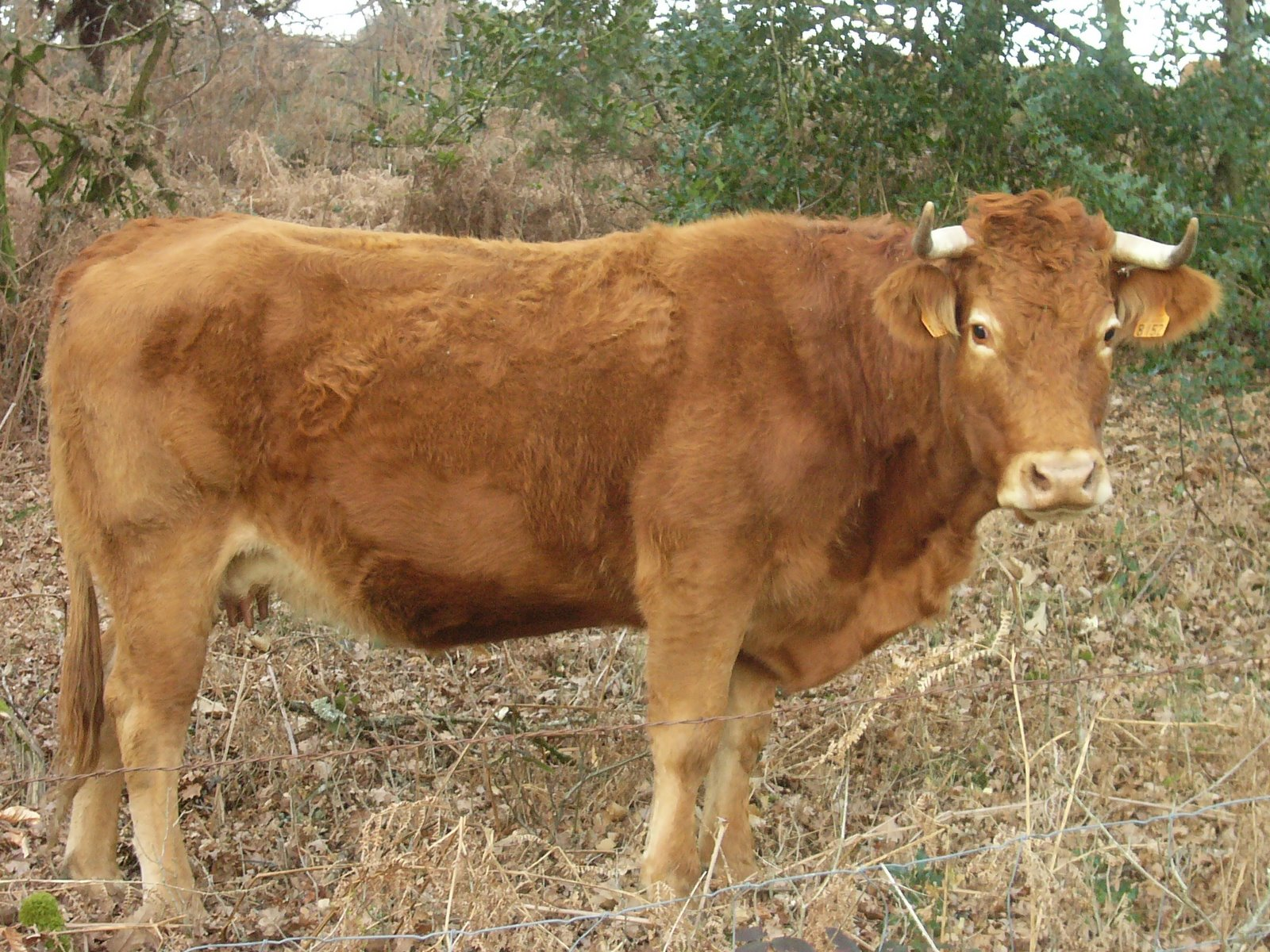
- Limousine cow
- Conservation status: FAO (2007): not at risk; DAD-IS (2020): not at risk
- Other names: Limousine
- Country of origin: France
- Distribution: about 80 countries world-wide
- Use: formerly draught; beef; crossbreeding

Traits
- Weight: Male: 1000–1300 kg; Female: 650–850 kg
- Height: Male: 140–155 cm; Female: 135–145 cm
- Coat: unicolour wheaten
- Horn status: horned in both sexes
- Cattle; Bos (primigenius) taurus

The Limousin (French: Limousine) is a French breed of beef cattle from the Limousin and La Marche former provinces of France. It was formerly used mainly as a draught animal, but in modern times is reared for beef. A herd-book was established in France in 1886. With the mechanisation of agriculture in the twentieth century, numbers declined. In the 1960s there were still more than 250 000 head, but the future of the breed was not clear; it was proposed that it be merged with the other blonde draught breeds of south-western France – the Blonde des Pyrénées, the Blonde de Quercy and the Garonnaise – to form the new Blonde d'Aquitaine. Instead, a breeders' association was formed; new importance was given to extensive management, to performance recording and to exports. In the twenty-first century the Limousin is the second-most numerous beef breed in France after the Charolais. It is a world breed, raised in about eighty countries round the world, many of which have breed associations.

== History ==
=== Origins ===
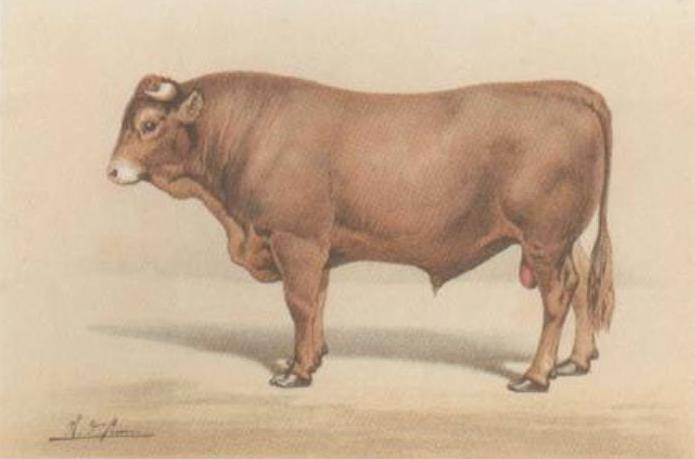
Bull, chromo-lithograph by Charles Olivier de Penne, 1863

DNA studies have identified close genetic relationships between Limousin cattle and other south-west European breeds. One study reported a possible common origin or recent gene flow between the Limousin and Charolais cattle breeds. (Note: This might be a result of limited DNA sampling detecting Charolais genetics introduced from base females incorrectly identified as Limousins.) whereas other studies indicated that a closer genetic relationship exists between Limousin, Gasconne, Aubrac, Bazadais, Salers, and Blonde d'Aquitaine cattle.

One historian reported that the Limousin breed's origins can be traced to the blonde Garonne breed of south-western France, which was merged into the Blonde d'Aquitaine in 1962.

The Limousin belongs to the blond group of European cattle, in a sub-group which also includes the Alpha 16, the Maraîchine, the Nantaise and the Parthenaise.

The Limousin originates in the Limousin, the area surrounding Limoges on the western flank of the Massif Central. It was originally a robust draught animal, used for agricultural work. As elsewhere, oxen at the end of their working lives were fattened and sent to slaughter, at times in major cities such as Bordeaux or Paris.

=== 18th and 19th centuries ===
In 1791, Jacques-Joseph Saint-Martin, an agronomist from Limoges, acknowledged the importance of Limousin cattle in the markets of cities such as Paris, Lyon, and Toulouse. Limousin cattle actually came from the departments of Charente, Dordogne, Haute-Vienne, Vienne, Lot, Corrèze, and Creuse. The market for Limousin cattle declined slightly in the early 19th century, but livestock still remained a major activity in the region.

A large variation in the agricultural systems was operating in the Limousin region, defined by three types of district. These were productive, grain-producing areas, called d'engrais, undeveloped, marginal, predominantly forested land called forestiers, and developing land called d'élèves. Cattle, in particular cows, were used extensively for all types of agricultural work.

At the beginning of the 19th century, a bonus was introduced to reward farmers who retained their best bulls, though they were not productive. The increase in weight of the animals began with improved grassland. The second half of the 19th century had the arrival of fertilizers and improved pastures such as clover and ryegrass, which not only improved the productivity of existing fields, but also transformed the moorland pasture. Vineyards affected by phylloxera were also being returned to pasture. The results were not immediate. In 1862, cattle sold at La Souterraine weighed about 600 kg. The decline of Anglomania in favour of economic pragmatism, and the criticism and fall of the aristocracy (Note: The century was dominated by the fall of the aristocratic elite, starting with the French Revolution in the last decade of the 18th century.) aided the development of Limousin cattle. The crowning moment was the honour received by the bull Achilles Caillaud to open the competition in Paris for all breeds in 1886 (the year the Limousin Herd Book was created), and the grand champion prize of all breeds won three years later by Charles Léobardy for his team. At the beginning of the 19th century, the Limousin region was characterised by the mediocrity of its animals. Texier-Olivier Louis, prefect of the Haute-Vienne, observed that Limousin cattle weighed 300 to 350 kg and measured 1.5 m at the withers. The defect was considered to be attributable to poor genetics, nutrition and breeding practices. In competitions, Limousin cattle were among the worst performers. The breed was considered to be a working breed, but poorly shaped and with poor milk.

To improve the breed, some Limousin breeders tried to cross their animals with Agenais, (Note: The Agenais breed no longer exists. It was merged into the Garonne breed, which was subsequently combined into the Blonde d'Aquitaine.) Norman or Charolais cattle, which were better shaped.

The Limousin breed was also not immune to the wave of Anglomania affecting France in the middle of the 19th century. Some wealthy farmers maintained Durham cattle, which were prized by the elite of the time. However, this practice was criticised by the agricultural society of Limoges. The society encouraged farmers to continue selecting animals that were most consistent with the characteristics of the Limousin breed, which was perfectly adapted to the region's environment, rather than trying to adapt other breeds. Furthermore, the vast majority of Limousin breeders could not afford to raise livestock in addition to their working animals, as was the case on larger properties that practiced crossing with Durham cattle.

Finally, the marginalisation of English animals in competitions from the late 1860s reinforced the case to improve the breed by itself. A herd-book was started in 1886.

=== 20th and 21st centuries ===
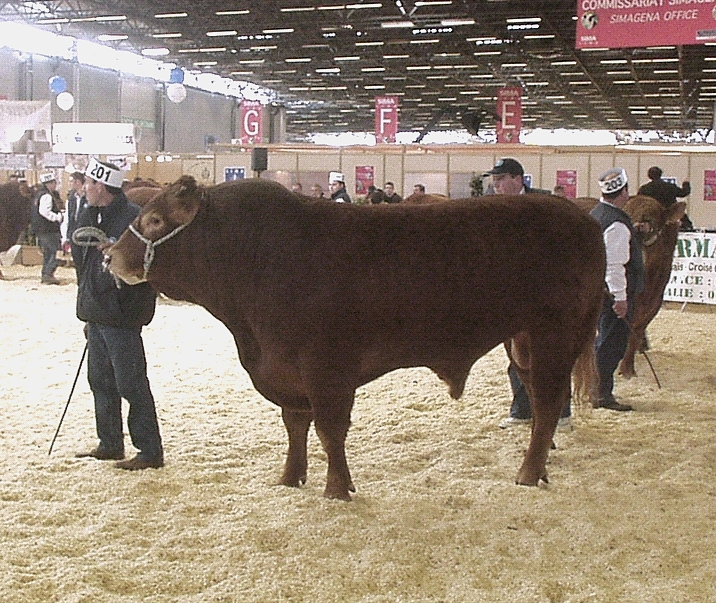
Bull at the Salon International du Machinisme Agricole in Paris, 2007

The First World War slowed down the growth of the Limousin breed, which carried through the interwar years despite a reorganisation of the herd book in 1923. Herd book registrations grew slowly, from 600,000 animals in 1890 to 800,000 in 1940.

The Limousin breed almost disappeared when the French government planned to combine it with the Garonne, Quercy, and Blonde des Pyrenées breeds, during the formation of the Blonde d'Aquitaine breed in 1962. All of these cattle belonged to the "blond and red" branch of cattle. Limousin breeders fiercely opposed the merger and the Limousin breed was retained.

The Limousin breed resumed its growth in the 1960s. The size of the French Limousin herd has increased sharply in recent years, with a 50% increase in numbers in France in 15 years. Today, it is the second-most numerous French beef breed, behind Charolais and ahead of Blonde d'Aquitaine. In 2004, of about 900,000 Limousin cows, 63,000 were recorded in the herd book. At that time, 20,000 bulls were used for breeding, 10% through artificial insemination, and 1,600 were recorded in the Herd Book. (Note: Animals not entered in the herd book are not certified as being of the Limousin breed. However, this does not mean they do not belong to the breed – only that they are not recorded and performance monitored. Indeed, recording in the herd book is not routinely sought by breeders who have no interest in competitions and in breeding and selling breeding animals, since recording represents a significant cost.) France's Limousin herd grew by 2.6% in 2014 to 2.69 million head as of 31 Dec., including 1.09 million cows.

== The herd-book ==
=== Significance ===
The purest form of Limousins have ancestors that can all be traced to "Full French" entries in the herd-book (known in France as Le livre généalogique). These Limousins are known by different names. In the US, and Canada they are known as Fullbloods, in Australia and New Zealand as French Pure, and in European countries such as Britain as purebred or simply Limousin.

In France, two Full French Herd Book classes exist, namely Pureblood (pur sang in French, also translated to Fullblood) and Pure Bred (race pure in French). The Full French Pure Bred Herd Book class, as with all European Union (EU) member countries' herd books, is controlled by EU legislation.

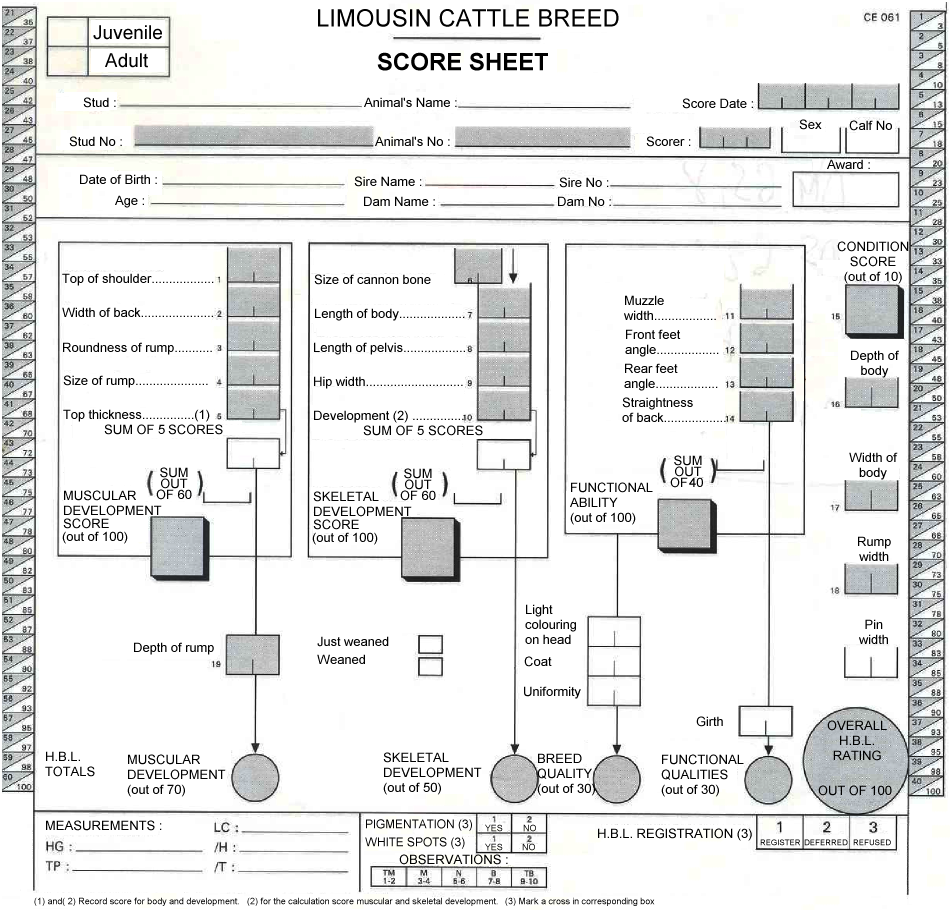
English translation of score sheet used by French assessors to determine if an animal is of appropriate quality to be certified Full French and recorded in the Herd Book

Full French is a term used by the French Limousin breeders' association (known in France as Herd Book Limousin, abbreviated to HBL) to describe cattle that comply with:

- Bred by French active member-associates of the HBL: The strictly enforced rules of the HBL require breeders to conduct on-farm performance testing of their animals and to have selected animals independently tested by approved official bodies.
- Independently inspected and certified to be Full French according to the Breed Standard. (Note: See score sheet appearing on page 2 of the associated reference translated from French into English.)
- Cattle excluded from Full French certification include those imported into France, cattle that are polled (in French sans corne), and cattle that have undesirable double muscling genes (in French gene culard) inherited from non-Limousin base animals.

A less pure form of Limousin is bred up (also known as graded up) from a base animal (Note: A base animal does not need to be a Limousin.) over a defined number of generations. A parent of each generation's progeny must be registered as a Limousin in the respective country's herd book. In the US, Canada, Australia, and New Zealand, a graded up Limousin, after three generations for females and four generations for males, is known (confusingly with the legal European definition) as purebred, which is then eligible for recording in the respective countries' herd books alongside Fullblood and French Pure Limousins. Unlike the US, Canada, Australia, and New Zealand, which allow both purebred and Full French bulls and dams to be used for grading up, in Britain, grading up can only occur using Full French bulls. British graded up females when they reach fourth generation from a non-Limousin base cow can then be registered as Limousins in the British Limousin Pedigree Register. The British Limousin Pedigree Register is separate from the British Limousin Herd Book, which is reserved for animals that have complete Full French ancestry.

=== Evolution of Herd Book ===
==== Prior to July 2007 ====
The herd-book was destroyed in the Second World War. When the French Government decided to merge the Limousin breed into the new Blonde d'Aquitaine breed in the 1960s, which was fiercely opposed by French Limousin breeders, the impetus to re-establish the herd-book was provided. Inspectors were appointed to identify "true to type" Limousins from the Limousin region. These were admitted to the new herd-book as foundation animals (in French titre initial, abbreviated to T.I.).

Following its re-establishment, the Herd Book was opened from time to time for the admission of T.I. females that on inspection satisfied the Full French breed standard. These animals were identified by the letters T.I. placed after their name. The process of admitting new T.I. animals to the Herd Book continued until June 2008. The Limousins recorded in the herd-book were known as Pureblood (literal translation of the French pur sang). The French: pur sang is normally the name given to English thoroughbred horses, although in the context of Limousins the English translation Fullblood is commonly used.

==== July 2007 to June 2008 ====
EU legislation, pressure from French breeders of polled stock, and other developments, including requirements of European Limousin associations (the 11 countries of EUROLIM), contributed to a restructuring of the herd-book that commenced in July 2007.

During the period July 2007 to June 2008, the herd-book comprised a main section (section principale in French) divided into the original Pureblood (pur sang) class and a newly created Purebred (race pure) class. The Purebred class was added to enable the recording of polled animals, those that carried a double-muscling gene (muscle hypertrophy abbreviated to MH, or gene culard in French), and those that did not comply fully with the French Breed standard.

==== After June 2008 ====
EU legislation allowed a supplementary section (section annexe in French) to be used to introduce genetics into existing breeds from other breeds in a grading up process aimed at "progressive improvement". According to the legislation, only females whose mother and maternal grandmother entered in a supplementary section, and whose father and two grandfathers are entered in the main section, can be regarded as purebred and entered in the main section of a herd book. Although this appears to be a simple two-stage grading up process, base females that start a new grading up line were also required by EU legislation to "be judged to conform to the breed standard". Since 2007, EU legislation allowed base animals to be males but infusion of their genetics into the main section is still only possible through their female progeny.

The restructured French Herd Book is described as having a third section called certified purebred (race pure certifié in French) intermediate between the first two for recording animals that do not comply with the breed standard (for example incorrectly coloured hair in certain places), have double muscling genes, or are polled. Limousins imported into France that comply with Council Directive 2009/157 are also recorded in sub-class 2 (sous-classe 2 in French) of the certified purebred class because they do not comply with the French HBL requirement of being Full French.

Base animals selected for the two-stage grading up process to any EU herd book purebred class require a minimum of 3/4 Limousin content. (Note: Indicated by the 3/4 appearing in the figure.) Graded up females using the two-stage process then become eligible for entry into the main section of all EU herd book purebred classes as initial registration (or T.I.) Limousins when they reach 15/16 Limousin content. They are then legally identified as Limousin (i.e. 100% Limousin) – the breed code 34 often substitutes for the word Limousin in French discussions and reports on cattle breeding.

Only the Certified Purebred sub-class 2 and Registered Purebred class are identified as Limousin in France because cattle of non-Limousin origin had been introduced into the supplementary section of the Pureblood class. The growth and spread of the Limousin breed in France since the early 1980s meant that a past practice of selecting a base female on appearance alone was no longer a guarantee of its breed origin because of the potential for "crossing absorption". Base females inadvertently assessed as Limousin and recorded as T.I. animals in the main section of the Pureblood class included Parthenais and Charolais, which were presumably the source of the double-muscling genes found in the French Limousin Pureblood population. In 2008, the double muscling gene had been found in 3% of active bulls in France.

Currently, only cattle recorded in the French Limousin Certified Purebred sub-class 2 and Registered Purebred class satisfy the requirements of EU law on herd books and can be transferred as Limousins, including indirectly through their genetics (for example semen and embryos), to other EU countries and recorded in the respective herd books. Outside of the EU, the rules and regulations of Limousin breed associations do not yet differentiate between the French Pureblood and Purebred classes, with the Pureblood class remaining the origin of, and standard for, the purest form of Limousin.

Since the 1960s and until 2008, the French Pureblood class defined the standard against which Limousins throughout the world were measured. Although it would seem appropriate to preserve the integrity of the herd-book as the international Limousin breed standard by preventing the EU-mandated entry of animals that do not meet the Full French standard, restrictions to such entries remain forbidden under EU law and subsequent interpretations by the European Court of Justice.

Immediately prior to the restructuring of the herd-book in 2008, French breeders had two months to nominate the class (Pureblood or Purebred) in which they wanted their cattle to be registered. Pureblood cattle have higher business value than Purebreds because they are preferred by French breeders. Also, Full French cattle benefit under a branded meat marketing label known as Blason Prestige Label Rouge, which has around 800 outlets in France.

==== Future ====
EU legislation on dehorning practices is expected to place greater pressure to breed polled cattle, which is being pursued in France by the GIE Polled Excellence group. Because no French Limousins had been identified with the polled gene, a breeding programme commenced in 2005 with polled Canadian bulls of phenotype closest to the French breed standard.

French breeders of polled Limousins claimed that the breed standard that prevented their animals being recorded in the French Herd Book provided an unfair export advantage to foreign countries that do not have similar restrictions. The French recording ban was removed in July 2007 with the introduction of the Purebred class, but so far no polled Limousin have yet been accepted and registered as Full French.

== Characteristics ==
=== Limousin breed standard ===
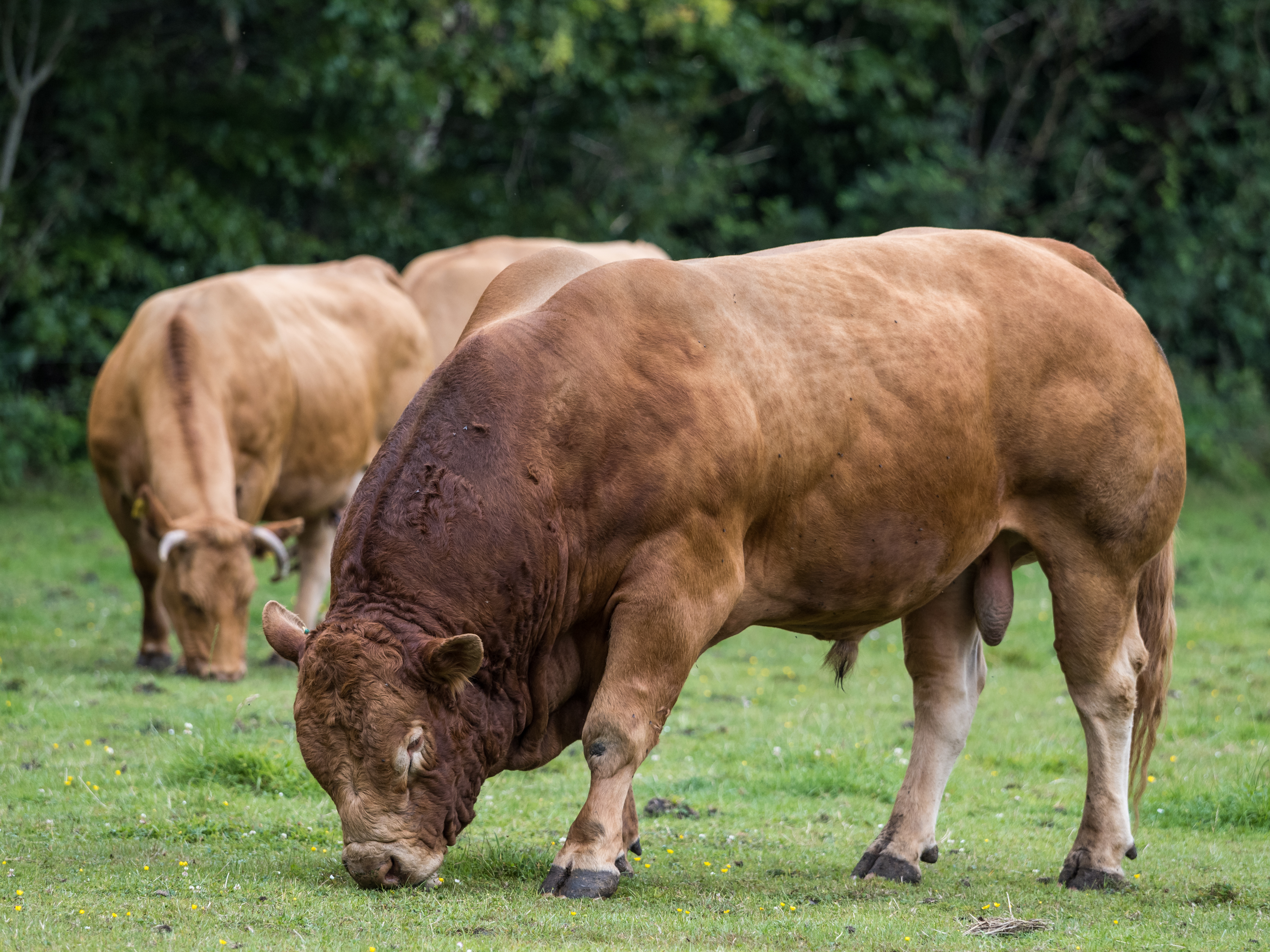
Bull in Lower Saxony

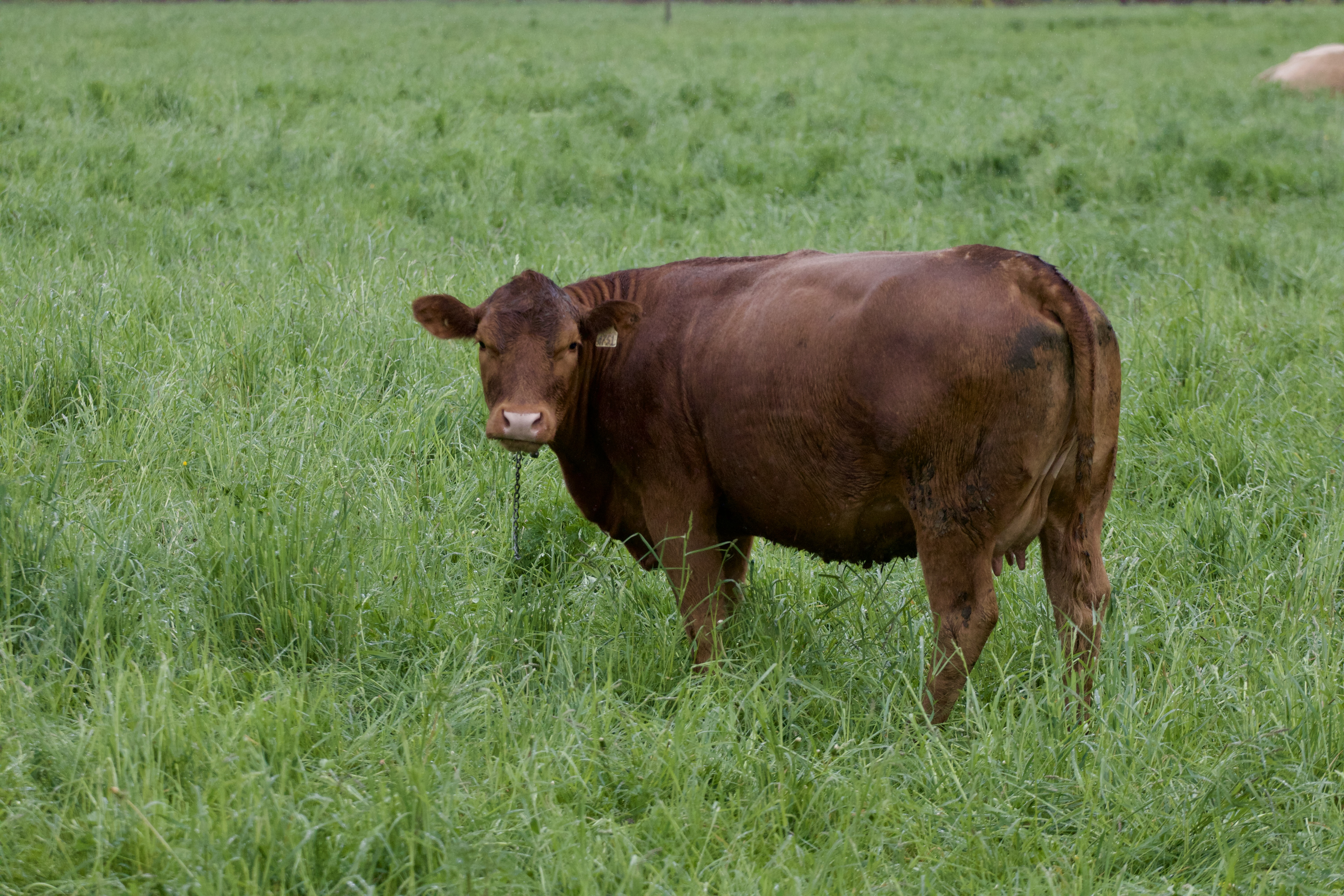
Cow in a field in Magog, Quebec

The French Limousin breed standard is described in Article 1 of Title I of the Rules of Procedure of the French Limousin herd-book, 1 August 1991: (Note: Translated from the breed standard appearing in the French language Limousin Wikipedia article.)

The Limousin is a large framed breed of beef cattle with a bright wheat-coloured coat, not too dark, a little lighter on the belly, the rear of the thighs, between the legs, on the anus, around the testicles or udder, and the tail tip. Absence of any spots or pigmentation, with pink mucous membranes. Short head, broad forehead and muzzle, lighter area around the eyes and muzzle, fine horns curved forward and slightly raised at the tip (if present). Short neck. Chest broad and rounded. Side round. Pelvis wide, especially at the pin bones, not too inclined. Bones of lower back and hips slightly protruding. Forequarter well-muscled, wide above and very muscular. Hindquarters thick, deep and rounded. Horns and hooves lighter coloured. Correct limbs. Fine supple hide.

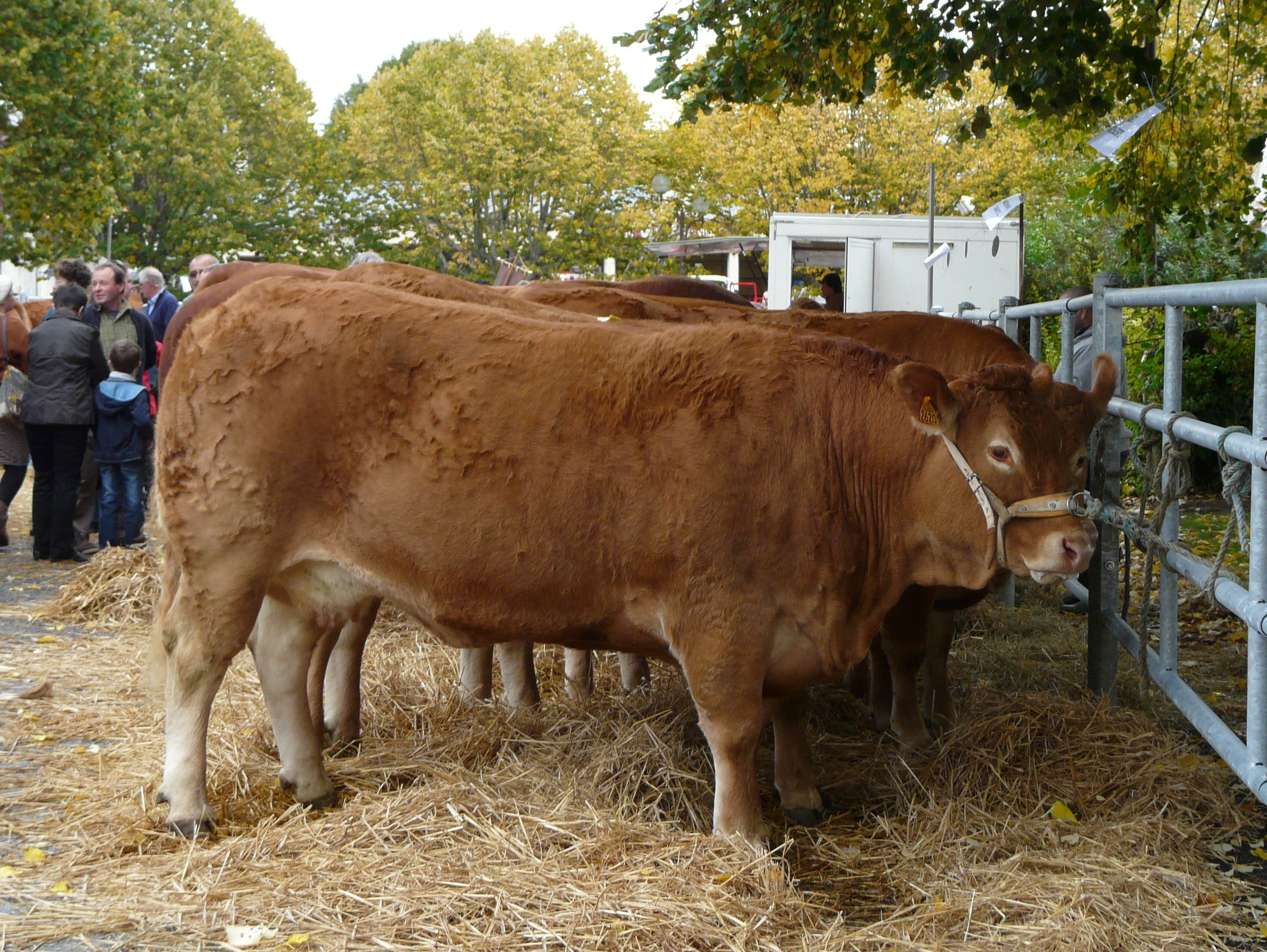
Cow at an agricultural show in Lanouaille, in the Dordogne

Characteristics considered unacceptable in the French breed standard:

- Any pigmentation or black spots on muzzle, black or white hairs anywhere on the coat, particularly in the ears, at the end of the tail and around the muzzle.
- White hairs anywhere.
- An eliminating count of less than five for any of the different breed standard points.
- A difficult or vicious disposition (tranquilising is forbidden).
- Any obvious physical malformation.

The French Limousin breed standard is applied by international breed associations in slightly different forms. These range from mandatory compliance before an animal can be recorded in a country's herd book (mainly European countries) to voluntary application in others. For example, in Belgium, application of its breed standard mirrors in most detail the French use, and in the UK, compliance with its version of the Limousin breed standard is required by the UK breed association's bye-laws.

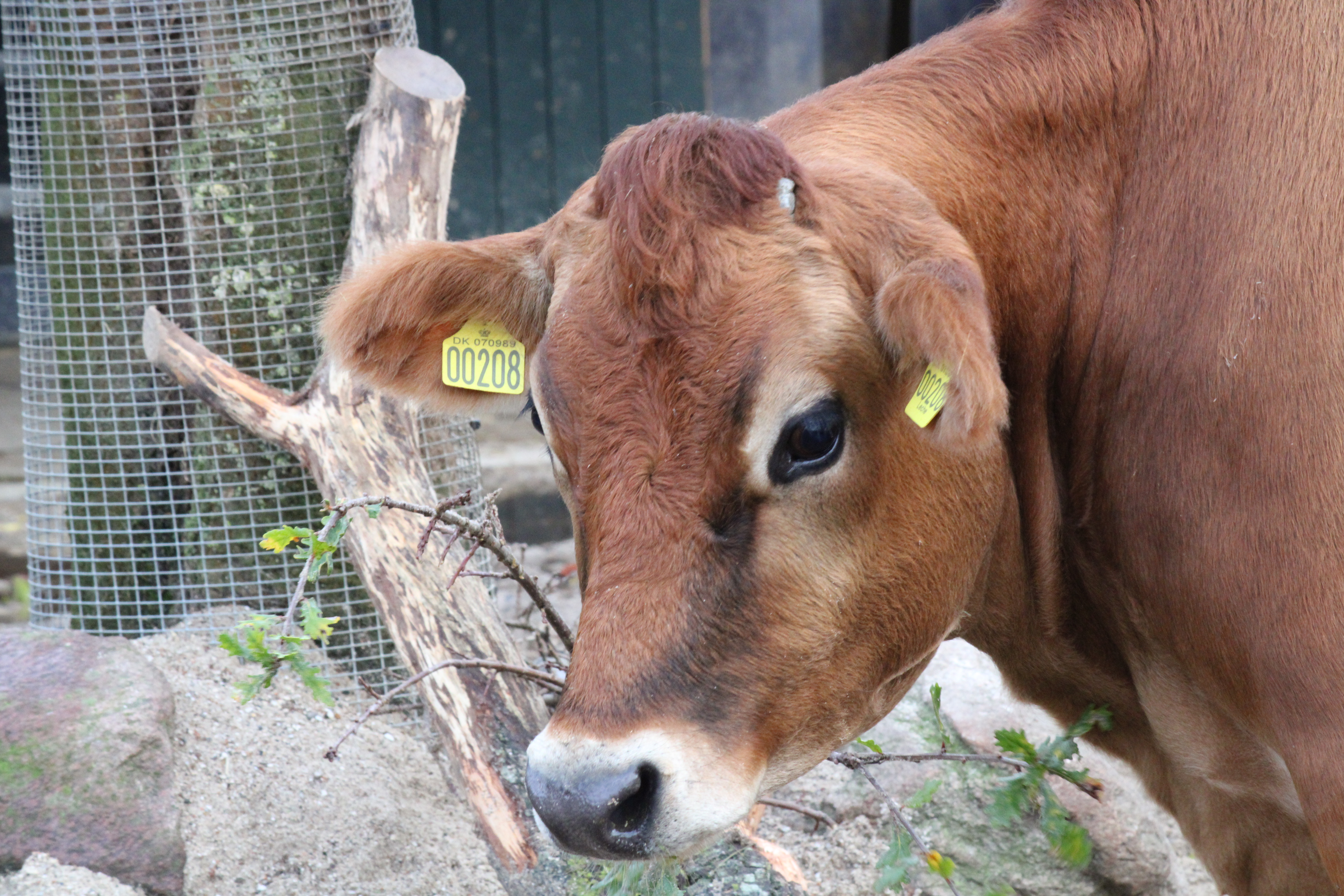
Close-up of head in Copenhagen

The USA, Canadian, Australian and New Zealand breed associations do not define a breed standard in their regulations, and application of any standard is voluntary. The only requirement for registration as a Fullblood in both North American herd book registers is that ancestors should have "full French ancestry", or trace directly to the "Herd Book Limousin in France". In Australia and New Zealand the French Pure herd book classification requires that animals carry "100% Pure French genetics". USA, Australian and New Zealand breed association regulations also allow graded up animals to be registered in their herd books as purebreds without a requirement to comply with a minimum French Limousin content. Grading up using these purebreds over base or lower grade animals has resulted in the gradual reduction in the French Limousin content of some purebreds, and an observable divergence from the French breed standard. The Canadian breed association by regulation prevents loss of French Limousin content from its registered purebreds by requiring that they "contain 90% or more Limousin blood".

In the US, Canada, Australia and New Zealand, breed development and selection is influenced principally by performance recording and genetic selection.

=== French performance recording and genetic prediction ===
Breeding scheme applied to the Limousin breed

The breed standard in France is applied in parallel to an intensively applied system of selection, performance recording and genetic prediction that was established gradually across the country commencing in the 1980s. The system appears to be similar to that used in Denmark.

All females recorded in the French Herd Book are controlled under this system, which focuses mainly on maternal qualities derived from measurements of calving ease, and growth and structure of calves. Females that achieve the best indexes for particular traits are then examined in detail by HBL technicians who assign grades based on morphology. The best females receive the qualification Reproductive Recognised (in French Reproductrice Reconnue, abbreviated to RR), which is awarded to the top 10%, or Reproductive Recommended (in French Reproductrice Recommandée, abbreviated to RRE) awarded to the top 1%. The qualifications aid the identification of superior animals.

For males, selection of the best breeders is more complex. The first step is weaning, when the morphology of calves and the known qualities of their parents are used to make an initial selection of animals that receive the qualification Reproductive Hope (in French Reproducteur Espoir, abbreviated to Espoir). Annually in excess of about 700 bull calves are then selected to enter the national evaluation station at Lanaud, close to Limoges, just after weaning, when they are about seven months old. At Lanaud the animals are grouped together to compare their performance under identical feeding and environmental conditions to the age of 13–14 months. The differences observed between the animals are then related principally to their genetics, which is of interest to breeders because this is what is transmitted to a bull's progeny.

After completing evaluation at Lanaud, half of the young bulls are awarded the qualification Reproductive young (in French Reproducteur jeune, abbreviated to RJ) by the HBL. Most of these bulls are intended for natural service, and the best are subjected to evaluations of their progeny. In the same way as for females, the best bulls receive the qualification "Reproductive Recognised" (RR), awarded to the top 10%, or "Reproductive Recommended" (RRE), awarded to the top 1%.

In parallel with the Lanaud evaluation station there are three local stations at La Souterraine in the Creuse department of the Limousin region, Saint-Jal in Corrèze, also in the Limousin region, and Naucelle in Aveyron in the south of France. The local stations provide commercial beef producers in their region with bulls of high production potential for use by commercial farmers whose herds are not necessarily registered in the French herd book.

The best bulls go to artificial insemination (AI) cooperatives where semen is taken. AI allows the wide distribution of a bulls' genetics to the benefit of more farmers. However, in order to guarantee their genetic qualities, the bulls are subject to a strict selection scheme to increase the accuracy of the different genetic indexes. The best bulls identified at Lanaud are sent to another test station at Naves in Corrèze. Here they are tested more accurately and evaluated for feed conversion efficiency, growth and muscle development. Progeny of the top 10 bulls out of this testing, and the best natural service bulls, are then evaluated. Cows are inseminated to produce 60 to 80 calves per bull tested, which are in turn evaluated.

Male progeny go to a station in Pépieux in the south of France, where they are fed a ration of corn silage before being slaughtered at the age of 16 months. In addition to evaluations of growth and conformation in the live animals, carcases, including fat composition, are evaluated. The best bulls identified in progeny testing are formally given the award Young Beef Cattle (in French Viande Jeunes Bovins, abbreviated to JB). Female progeny go to a test station in Moussour in Corrèze, where they are inseminated with the same bulls and calve at two years in confinement before being put out to pasture with their calves. The test station evaluates weight, growth, morphology, fertility, calving ability and milking ability in order to assess their maternal qualities. The best bulls following the tests on their daughters are identified as Maternal Qualities (in French Qualités Maternelles, abbreviated to QM).

The qualifications RR and RRE are recorded with an animal's description in sales' catalogues and other promotional literature. As a further aid to purchasers of French Limousin genetics, additional qualifications provide a guide to the greatest likely production benefit based on an animal's genetics estimated from on-farm progeny testing. The qualifications are aligned with French market specifications for Limousin beef:

- VS – awarded to sires recognised or recommended for weaner production.
- VB – awarded to AI sires recognised or recommended for vealer production.
- JB – awarded to AI sires recognised or recommended for general beef production.
- QM – awarded to AI sires recognised or recommended for breeding stock production.
- M – awarded to AI sires recognised or recommended for both general beef and breeding stock production.
- P – awarded to females recognised or recommended for the production of early developing progeny.
- T – awarded to females recognised or recommended for the production of late developing progeny.

=== Genetic basis for muscling in Limousin cattle ===
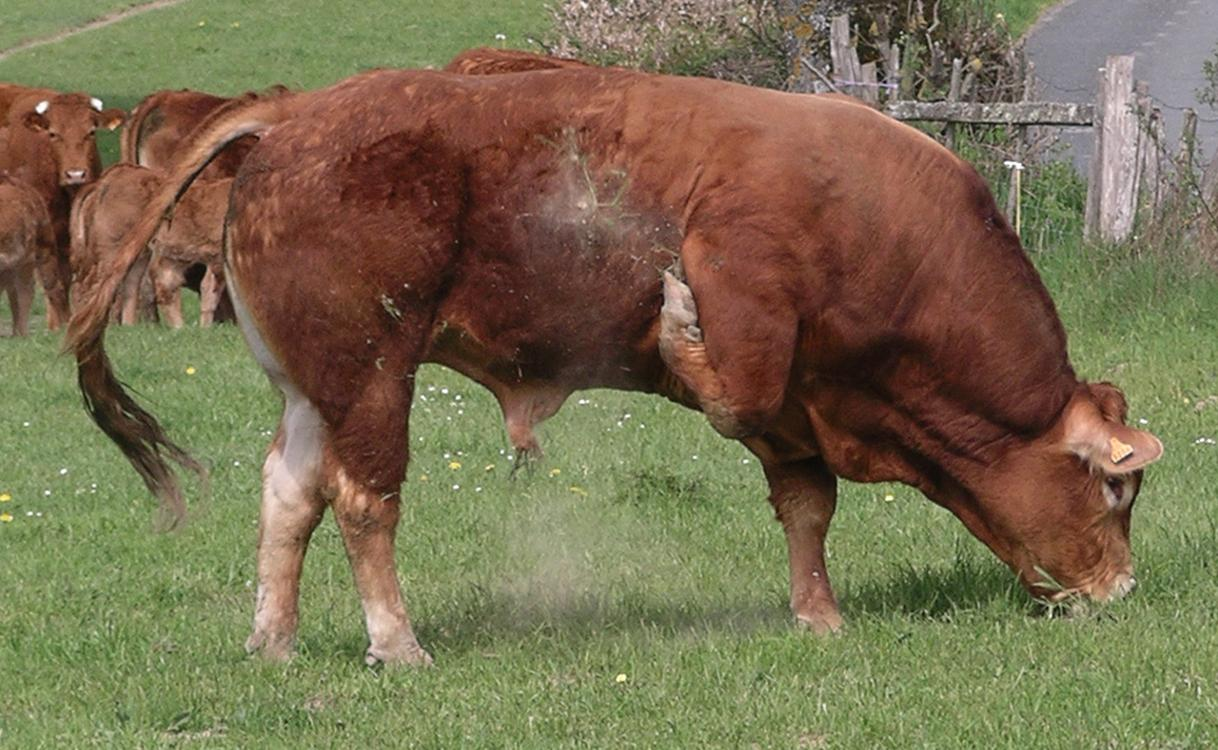
Limousin bull and herd near Bourg d'Hem in Limousin

The Limousin cattle breed has been popular in France for more than two centuries because of its meat qualities and the breed's production efficiency. Since the early 1990s scientists have quantified these breed characteristics in comparisons with other breeds, and identified a natural variant of the myostatin gene found in Limousins which has a significant influence on them. The myostatin gene is found in all mammals and influences the production of a protein that controls muscle development. Variants of the gene produce proteins that are less effective at controlling muscle development, which results in increased muscle mass.

Limousin muscling is intermediate to that of British cattle breeds such as Aberdeen Angus, Hereford, and Shorthorn and the extreme double muscling found in the European Belgian Blue and Piedmontese breeds. Studies of double-muscled cattle identified natural mutations of the myostatin gene which produce inactivated proteins that are unable to control muscle development. In Belgian Blue and Piedmontese cattle this causes an increase in muscle mass of 20–25%. Subsequent studies identified a less extreme myostatin mutation known as F94L associated with Limousins. The resulting partially active protein results in Limousins having intermediate muscle development, which avoids the extreme muscling and associated disadvantages of double muscled cattle.

A Limousin/Jersey backcross study conducted in Australia and New Zealand to investigate the effects of the F94L myostatin variant concluded that the mutation had no significant effect on birth-weight and growth traits. Averaged over all backcross calves in the trial (total of 766), animals homozygous for the mutation had approximately 6% heavier carcases than animals without the mutation, 15% larger eye muscle (also known as rib eye) area, 13% heavier silverside weight, and 13% heavier total meat weight. Increased meat weight and size was accompanied by a 15% reduction in intra-muscular fat and 25% reduction in total fat weight. No other significant effects were observed. A second backcross study conducted in Japan of Limousin and Japanese Black breeds identified similar changes to meat and fat quantities in cattle homozygous for the F94L mutation.

Although the Australian/New Zealand study found that the F94L mutation was partially to significantly recessive in most traits, meaning cattle heterozygous for the mutation express less to significantly less than half of the effects noted for homozygous cattle, the Japanese study found that the meat and fat quantities in cattle heterozygous for the mutation were about midway between the two extremes.

=== Distribution of F94L myostatin variants in Limousin cattle ===
A number of international breed associations have been testing the F94L status of cattle registered in their herd books. The absence of F94L genes in some tested cattle might be a result of a sire or dam ancestor that had double muscling (MH) genes, or more likely that the myostatin gene was the normal or wild type variant found most commonly in beef cattle. In the latter case, loss of the F94L variant will arise when grading up to purebred when base animals are not Limousins.

==== Europe ====
Of the 14 Limousins tested during the research that led to the discovery of the F94L variant, 12 cattle were homozygous for the variant and two were heterozygous. The second myostatin genes in both heterozygous cases were each different myostatin MH variants of types normally found in Belgian Blue and Charolais cattle.

==== Britain ====
British test results of sale bulls in February 2010 indicated that of 142 animals tested, just under 90% were homozygous for the F94L mutation, about 8.5% were heterozygous, and 1.5% did not have the mutation.

==== USA ====
Test results of approximately 1,100 cattle recorded in the North American Limousin Foundation herd book show the following distributions for three classes of animal. About 94.4% of Fullbloods, 62.3% of purebreds and 5.3% of Lim-Flex were homozygous for the F94L mutation.

Distribution of F94L variants in tested US Limousins (29 May 2010)
	Homozygous	Heterozygous	None	Total tested
Fullblood	67 (94.4%)	2 (2.8%)	2 (2.8%)	71
Purebred	524 (62.3%)	256 (30.4%)	61 (7.3%)	841
Lim-Flex	10 (5.3%)	106 (55.8%)	74 (38.9%)	190

==== Australia and New Zealand ====
Test results of 1028 cattle recorded in the Australian and New Zealand herd book indicate that 96.7% of Fullbloods (known in Australia as French Pure), 88.0% of purebreds, and 33.3% of a limited sample of Lim-Flex were homozygous for the F94L mutation.

Distribution of F94L variants in tested Australian and New Zealand Limousins (7 December 2012)
	Homozygous	Heterozygous	None	Total tested
Fullblood (French Pure)	260 (96.7%)	9 (3.3%)	0	269
Purebred	657 (88.0%)	84 (11.2%)	6 (0.8%)	747
Lim-Flex	4 (33.3%)	8 (66.7%)	0	12

==== Implications for cattle heterozygous for the F94L variant ====
Cattle heterozygous for the F94L myostatin mutation have a 50% probability of passing the mutation to their progeny. Because the mutation has greatest effect on carcase traits, only 50% of progeny of a heterozygous parent will inherit increased muscling associated with the mutation.

Furthermore, best linear unbiased prediction (BLUP) techniques used to estimate the genetic merit of stud cattle (for example, estimated breeding values (EBVs) and expected progeny differences (EPDs)) will be incorrect because they assume that no dominant genes contribute to modelled traits.

Inconsistent inheritance of myostatin mutations (for example, F94L in Limousins, nt821 in Angus, and Q204X in Charolais) by progeny is expected to result in possible BLUP prediction errors for EBVs and EPDs equalling or exceeding worst case standard errors of prediction. For example, average rib eye area for Limousins in US Meat Animal Research Center (USMARC) trials during the 1980s and early 1990s is reported to be 12.3 in^{2}, and the reported possible difference in rib eye area in progeny arising from inheritance of either two F94L mutations or two normal myostatin genes from heterozygous parents is estimated to be 1.8 in^{2} (12.3 in^{2} × 15%). This difference, which is unpredictable without DNA testing, is nearly four times the possible change value for a 0% BIF accuracy, reported to be 0.46 in^{2} for the rib eye EPD.

When one parent is heterozygous for the mutation, and the other homozygous for the mutation or the normal form of the myostatin gene, the expected average difference in rib eye area of progeny will be about 0.9 in^{2} (12.3 in^{2} × 7.5%), depending on whether the mutation or normal form of the gene is inherited from the heterozygous parent. In this case, the unpredictable variation in rib eye area represents about twice the possible change value for a 0% BIF accuracy.

Standard errors of prediction, also known as accuracy or possible change value in the context of EBV and EPD predictions, are dependent on the quality of information used to predict an animal's EBV or EPD for a given trait. Errors in estimating genetic merit are being addressed in research programmes that aim to supplement phenotypic data extensively used in current BLUP predictions with genotypic data.

=== Comparisons with other breeds ===
A USMARC long-term multi-breed study of Limousins, three British (Red Poll, Hereford, Aberdeen Angus) and five other continental European (Braunvieh, Pinzgauer, Gelbvieh, Simmental, Charolais) cattle breeds reported that Limousin cattle were the most efficient and fastest of all breeds at converting feed into saleable meat even though Limousin's live weight growth was the slowest. This arose because saleable meat yield expressed as percentage of live weight was significantly higher in Limousins than in most other cattle breeds. Saleable meat yield was an average 34.9% of live weight for the three British cattle breeds, compared with 40.4% for the five other continental European breeds, and 46.0% for Limousins, for two market end points of 225 kg saleable meat at 8mm fat trim, and 210 kg saleable meat at 0mm fat trim. Live weight gain for the Limousins averaged 1.27 kg/day, compared with an average 1.29 kg/day for the British breeds and 1.38 kg/day for the other continental European cattle. Limousin saleable meat gain averaged 585g/day, with the balance being 687g/day of low value or waste product, such as bone, trimmed fat, internal organs, and hide. The British breeds produced significantly less saleable meat (average 451g/day) and significantly more low value product (841g/day), while consuming about twice the feed of the Limousins from entry to the trial (weaning) to the market end point (slaughter). The other continental European breeds produced on average less saleable meat (556g/day) and more low cost product (819g/day) while consuming about 25% more feed than the Limousins. Although the Simmental and Charolais produced marginally more saleable meat (590g/day) than Limousins, they produced significantly more low cost product (847g/day) and consumed 18% more feed.

For a market end point of 333 kg carcase weight, the Limousin carcases in the USMARC study were estimated to be on average 63.5% of live weight, compared with an average 59.7% (range 58.6% – 60.4%) for the eight other breeds. Similar figures for Limousin meat yield are reported in other sources.

The USMARC study indicated that Limousins were significantly the slowest of all breeds to achieve market end points of two measures of marbling score (70 to 160 days longer than the British breeds, and 65 to 70 days longer than the other continental European breeds) while feed conversion efficiency based on live weight gain was marginally poorer (12% less than the British breeds and comparable with the other continental European breeds). When feed conversion efficiency is adjusted to weight of saleable meat divided by feed consumed, Limousin feed conversion efficiency then exceeds both British and continental European breeds by 10–25%. The USMARC study also indicated that Limousins were very significantly the slowest of all breeds to achieve market specifications of three measures of rib eye fat (300 to 400 days longer than the British breeds, and 170 to 220 days longer than the other continental European breeds) while feed conversion efficiency based on live weight gain was poorer (25–30% less than the British breeds and 12–16% less than the other continental European breeds). When corrected to saleable meat divided by feed consumed, feed conversion efficiency was similar or marginally better for Limousins. At these end points, Limousins finished at markedly heavier live weights (up to 490 kg heavier than the British breeds, and 190 kg heavier than the other continental European breeds).

The latest USMARC study of Limousins, two of the British breeds and three of the continental European breeds from the original study, reported similar saleable meat yields/live weight for the British breeds (average 36.3%, compared with the earlier 34.9%) and other continental European breeds (average 38.7%, compared with 40.4%), but a significant reduction for Limousin (39.4% compared with 46.0%). However, feed conversion to saleable meat for Limousins for the six reported market end points still exceeded the average of the other two breed groups by up to one-fifth.

Live weight and daily live weight gain are the simplest and most common of all traits to be measured and reported, which continues to mask Limousin's superior saleable meat production efficiency.

Breed differences are expected to have reduced since the USMARC studies in the 1980s and 1990s because of the wide-scale introduction and use of performance recording and genetic improvement programmes. The reduction in yield reported for Limousins is possibly a result of the loss of French Limousin content and of F94L myostatin mutations from the US purebred population, which would be an expected result of the purebred grading up process practiced there. Earlier USMARC studies are reported to have evaluated high content pure French Limousins.

Breed comparison studies of performance-tested bulls report Limousin's more efficient conversion of feed into live weight and confirm the breed's slower live weight gain when compared with other beef cattle breeds.

Limousins generally have lower levels of intra-muscular fat (marbling) and subcutaneous fat when compared with British breed cattle grown in similar conditions. Marbling, together with tenderness and flavour, has been associated with eating quality in some countries, and attracts a higher quality grading with associated premiums, although the link between marbling and palatability is not universally supported. In some countries, Limousin's lean, tender meat is considered to be of outstanding quality and marketed through specialist outlets. Beef producers targeting the higher marbling specifications of some markets, but who have concerns over the poorer feed conversion efficiency and yield associated with higher marbling British breed cattle, use Limousin sires over British breed cows, or British breed sires over Limousin cows, in crossbreeding programmes that aim to achieve a balance between the different and conflicting production demands.

=== Crossbreeding with Limousins ===
Crossbreeding increases production efficiency because of hybrid vigour, and allows complementary traits of parents to be combined to produce progeny better suited to different environments or markets. Crossbreeding through the use of Limousin terminal sires in purebred British breed cow herds allows the complementary traits of higher marbling and fat cover provided by the British breed cows, and required or preferred by some markets, to be combined with the higher yield and feed conversion efficiency of Limousin sires.

Crossbred cows produce up to, and in some cases in excess of, 20% more weaned calf weight as a result of increased reproductive performance and maternal ability. Crossbred cow longevity is also increased by up to two years when compared with straightbred cows. However, the benefits of hybrid vigour in a crossbred cow decline in subsequent generations if progeny are mated to cattle of parentage similar to the cow, and increase if a new breed is introduced. Although studies acknowledge that the major production benefits of hybrid vigour occur in crossbred cow herds, the main use of Limousins outside of Europe continues to be as terminal sires in purebred British breed cow herds.

==== Genetic basis for crossbreeding ====
Progeny of two parents of different breeds are termed F1 hybrids, F1 crosses or first crosses. F1 hybrids generally have an extremely uniform phenotype and benefit from hybrid vigour. These advantages are observed in the breeding of a wide variety of animals and plants, and arise because progeny inherit one of each paired gene from each parent. When both parents are homozygous for different variants of genes (known as alleles), which is likely to be the case when a breed has been developed and selected over several generations, progeny will inherit both gene variants present in the parents. The F1 hybrid progeny will then be heterozygous for each gene variant, which in turn increases the likelihood that the genes will code for an optimal protein or enzyme. This is the genetic basis of hybrid vigour. While many gene variants have effects that are of little consequence to beef production, a few, such as the myostatin variants found in different cattle breeds, have a major effect.

Loss of hybrid vigour occurs and phenotype varies greatly in subsequent generations if F1 hybrids are interbred or backcrossed with animals genetically similar to the F1 parent. Interbred F1 hybrids produce progeny that can be either heterozygous for each gene variant, homozygous for one gene variant, or homozygous for the other gene variant. When one of the variants has a large effect on a trait, for example the effect of myostatin variants on muscularity, larger phenotypic variation will occur among the progeny. Backcross progeny have less phenotypic variation and comprise animals that are either heterozygous for each gene variant or homozygous for the variant found in the original F1 backcross parent.

A third form of progeny arises when F1 hybrids are bred with animals genetically dissimilar to their parents. If heterozygosity is maintained or increased as a result, hybrid vigour and other production benefits occurring in the F1 generation will be maintained or increased. Maintenance of heterozygosity is the key to maintaining the highest levels of hybrid vigour. This requires complex breeding programmes and high levels of management. Simplified crossbreeding programmes have been developed using hybrid or composite bulls, which was the motivation behind the development of Lim-Flex hybrids.

The two major Limousin hybrids are Brahmousin (a cross between Brahman and Limousin cattle) and Lim-Flex (a cross between Angus and Limousin cattle), which were both developed before the significance of the F94L myostatin variant had been quantified. When Limousins homozygous for the F94L myostatin mutation are used in crossbreeding, only one of the mutations will be inherited (that is, progeny will be heterozygous for the mutation), and a high level of phenotypic uniformity and hybrid vigour would be expected in the progeny. However, breeding using heterozygous animals as parents, which could include purebred Limousins of low percentage Full French content, (Note: Statistically, in the absence of other selection pressures, the three-generation for females, and four-generation for males, purebred Limousin grading up process used in Canada, USA, Australia, and New Zealand will result in the loss of homozygous F94L carriers from the purebred population at about twice the rate of loss of Full French Limousin content.) and Lim-Flex and Brahmousin hybrids that have not been bred to a uniform (homozygous) standard over several generations, would produce progeny with inconsistent carcase characteristics and production value depending upon whether or not the F94L mutation was inherited.

The use of Lim-Flex and Brahmousin sires over a third breed of cow would benefit most from increased hybrid vigour, which should minimise any reduction in carcase value arising from the loss of the F94L mutation.

According to research into the effects of the F94L mutation, live weights of progeny are unaffected by random inheritance of the mutation.

==== Brahmousin ====
Brahmousin cattle are a hybrid purebred breed of Brahman and Limousin first created in the US in the late 1970s. The goal was to blend the best of the Limousin and Brahman traits to create a breed that has reproductive efficiency, mothering ability, good muscling and growth traits, and adaptability to varying environmental conditions. Brahmousin are now bred in the US, Indonesia, El Salvador, and Australia.

The first Brahmousin cattle were produced from a multiple embryo transfer from a French-imported Limousin dam. The resulting progeny were then crossed with Brahman cattle to achieve an F1 hybrid. Further crosses over a broader base led to the production of the 5/8 Limousin – 3/8 Brahman Brahmousin purebred, a mix which has been found to be the most widely accepted and most useful for the majority of the US. The American Brahmousin Council allows animals that are not purebred to be recorded as percentage animals as long as they are at least one-quarter Limousin and one-quarter Brahman. To be recorded as a purebred Brahmousin, the animal must then be sired by a registered purebred or fullblood Limousin bull, registered Brahman bull, or a registered purebred Brahmousin bull.

In Australia, Brahmousin are between one-quarter and three-quarters of the parent breeds with the objective of combining the muscle growth and meat quality of Limousins with the heat and parasite resistance, fast growth, and good mothering ability of the Brahman. Brahmousin is formally recognised as a cattle breed in Australia.

==== Lim-Flex ====
Unlike the Brahmousin, Lim-Flex does not have purebred breed status in any participating countries, which includes the US, Australia, New Zealand, and Canada. The need for the Lim-Flex hybrid arose in 2000 out of a perceived need by North American commercial cattle breeders for hybrid bulls that would assist in achieving end-product targets.

Lim-Flex is a registered certification mark awarded to Limousin:Angus crossbred or hybrid cattle in the US with content between 25% and 75% Limousin pedigree blood, and between 25% and 75% of either Angus or Red Angus pedigree blood, with a maximum allowable 1/8th of unknown or other breed. Lim-Flex provide genetic options ranging from high content fullblood and purebred Limousin with high levels of muscle and efficiency, to blended options with higher marbling and maternal characteristics associated with Angus cattle, to meet the needs of crossbreeding programmes.

The Lim-Flex certification mark has been adopted in Australia and New Zealand, where "commercial Lim-Flex must be 25 to 75 percent Limousin and 25 to 75 percent Angus or Red Angus", and in Canada, where they "must be 37.5 to 75 percent Limousin and 25 to 62.5 percent Angus or Red Angus, with a maximum allowance of another breed or unknown breed composition of 12.5 percent (1/8th)".

=== Appearance ===
Most Limousin cattle's coloration varies from light wheat to darker golden-red. Other coloration, mainly black, has been developed through cross-breeding and grading up from other breeds of cattle. In addition to altering natural coloration, other traits, such as polled (a genetic lack of horns), have been introduced through crossbreeding. Angus cattle have been the dominant source of black and polled genes now present in graded-up, high-content Limousins found throughout the world.

=== Temperament ===
Since the mid-1990s, Limousin breeders have worked extensively on improving disposition issues in Europe, North America, Australia and New Zealand. This has been aided by the high heritability of temperament and by the development of genetic measures of docility (among many other traits) predicted from field measurements and subsequent analysis using BLUP techniques to produce docility EBVs and EPDs. Significant improvement has been recorded in the temperament of Limousins, as can be observed from trait trends published by various international breed associations.

== Distribution outside France ==
=== Initial exports ===
Following the creation of the French Limousin Herd-Book in 1886, Limousins were exported to Brazil (1886), New Caledonia (1902), Uruguay (1910), Madagascar (1922), Argentina (1924), and Portugal (1929). However, the only herd that became established outside France during this period was in New Caledonia, which continued to import Limousins. It was not until after the reform of Limousin breeding in France in 1962 that significant numbers were exported around the world. Limousins were reintroduced in Argentina (1966) and Brazil (1978), and imported to other European countries such as Spain (1965), Italy (1968), the Netherlands (1969), Denmark (1970), and the United Kingdom (1971). Their introduction to the United Kingdom provided opportunities for Australia and New Zealand to import semen in 1972. Soon after, New Zealand allowed the importation of Limousins from both Ireland and the United Kingdom, and the first Full French cattle were imported to Australia from New Zealand in 1975.

An essential step in the global spread of the Limousin breed was made in 1968 with the importation of the first bull, Prince Pompadour, to Canada. The semen of this bull was made available to the United States in 1969. During the early 1970s, imports of animals to North America started to grow strongly. Today, the North American Limousin Foundation is the largest global Limousin breeders' association.

=== Current situation ===
Limousins' ability to adapt to different environments has contributed greatly to the breed's current success outside France. In most cases, Limousin bulls or their semen are now imported to improve locally bred Limousins. Today, the breed is present in about 70 countries around the world, and in all latitudes ranging from Finland in the north to South Africa in the south. Limousin breeders' associations exist in many of these countries, and 29 of these are members of the International Limousin Council (ILC). The ILC was founded at Limoges in 1973 by Louis de Neuville, the Limousin breed ambassador. In 1989, EUROLIM was formed to bring together all of the herd books of European Limousins.

Limousins in different countries are bred according to different selection practices or objectives, and are only connected by limited international gene flows. Poor genetic connectedness between countries makes it hard to estimate accuracies of international genetic prediction programmes. As a result of genetic drift or different selection, each country's population of Limousins is becoming genetically differentiated, but this is partly counterbalanced by gene flows from other countries. A study of over 2.4 million Limousin pedigree files of five European countries (France, Denmark, Ireland, Sweden, United Kingdom) showed moderate gene flows from France to the United Kingdom and Denmark, but negligible gene flows to Sweden. Except for gene flows originating from France, and some limited gene flows between Denmark and Sweden in the 1990s, bull and semen exchanges between European countries have been scarce, especially since about 2000. Cow and embryo flows have been even scarcer. Conversely, the genetic contribution of North American Limousins to European countries has increased since the late 1990s, because of their use in breeding programmes to introduce the polled gene.

International Limousin genetics are now widely available in many countries for use in artificial insemination programmes. This has been facilitated by many companies that specialise in the export and import of semen. Details of semen are published in extensively distributed catalogues.
