= North American Piedmontese =

Breed of cattle

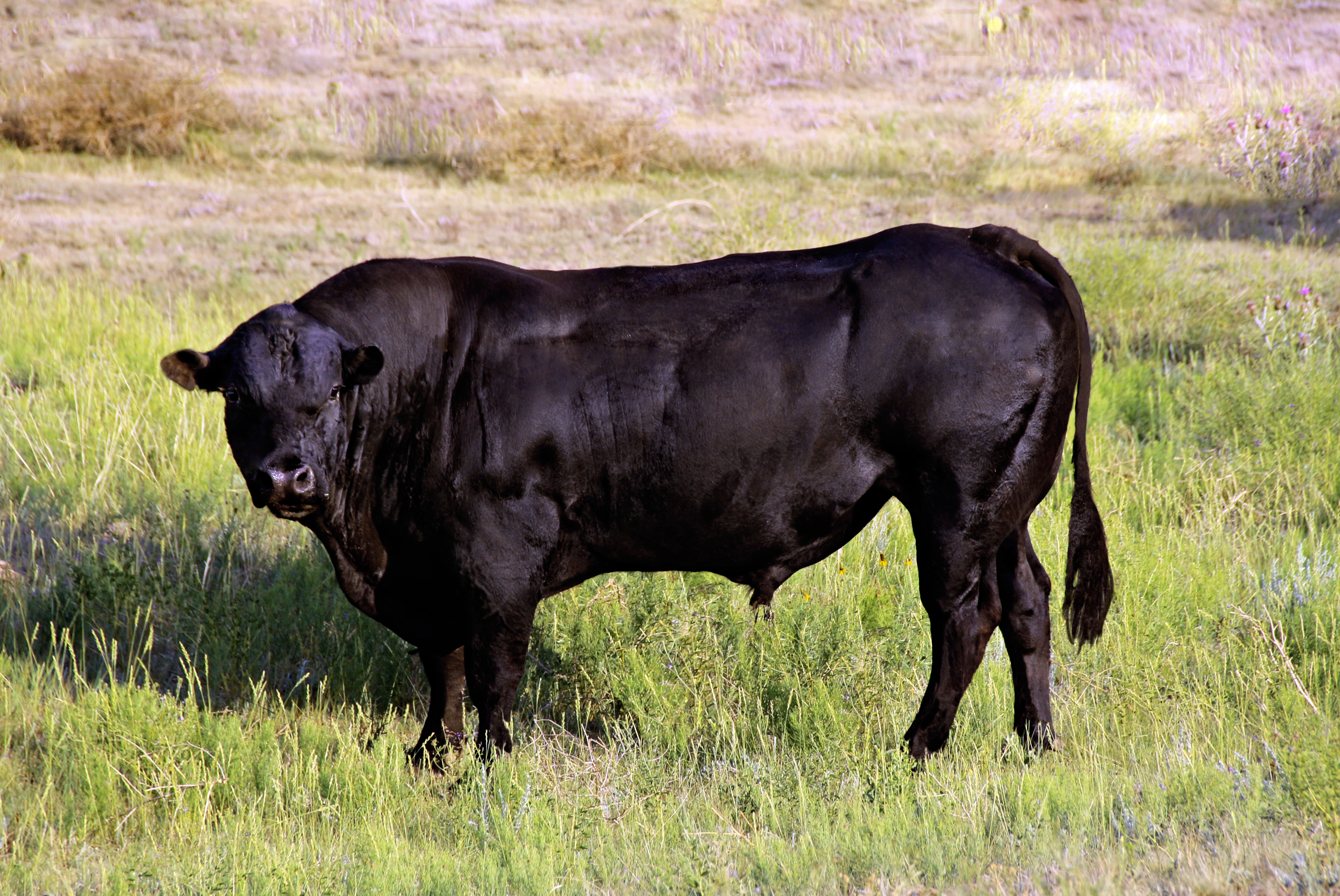
- National Champion MLF Unforgettable 911W
- Other names: Fullblood Piedmontese, and Naturalean Homozygous
- Country of origin: North America
- Distribution: Canada, United States
- Standard
- Use: Raised primarily for meat

Traits
- Weight: Male: to 2,090 lb (950 kg); Female: to 1,430 lb (650 kg)
- Height: Male: to 4.76 ft (145 cm); Female: to 4.43 ft (135 cm)
- Skin color: Fullblood are black Naturalean are black or reddish
- Coat: Fullblood are gray, some black hairs on head and spots over body Naturalean are solid black, or solid red
- Horn status: Fullblood are horned Naturalean may be polled

North American Piedmontese cattle are a breed of domestic beef cattle originating from an imported herd of select Italian purebred Piedmontese cattle (Piemontese or razza bovina Piemontese). The foundation line of breeding stock was first imported from Italy into Canada in 1979, and into the United States in the early 1980s. Piedmontese cattle are distinguished by a unique, naturally occurring gene identified as the myostatin allele mutation, or inactive myostatin gene. Myostatin prohibits muscle growth whereas an inactive gene has the opposite effect. Purebred Piedmontese are homozygous, (2 copy), which means they have two identical alleles present for this unique gene. Research indicates the presence of the myostatin allele mutation produces morphological characteristics unique to the breed, such as double-muscling, (Note: Double muscling does not mean the cattle have twice the muscle, rather it means they have increased muscle fibers.) beef tenderness, reduced fat content and high yield. According to the North American Piedmontese Association (NAPA), they are the first breed registry to base animal registration requirements on the presence of this specific gene which can be easily verified by DNA testing.

== Evolution and history ==
North American Piedmontese cattle originated from a line of Italian purebred Piedmontese cattle, (Italian: Piemontese or razza bovina Piemontese), in the region of Piedmont in northwest Italy. They continue to be cultivated in Italy as a "dual-purpose animal...having very rich milk used for specialty cheese production and beef marketed as a premium product." There is much speculation on the breed's evolution, but Italian professor Silvano Maletto theorizes — based on evidence obtained from fossil records and cave writings — that the breed descends from ancient Aurochs cattle and the Pakistan Zebu cattle. Reports of the first historical evidence for breeding Piedmontese cattle dates back only to the late 1800s, and credits the work of another Italian professor, Domenico Vallada.

In 1979, the Piedmontese Breeding Co-operative, Ltd. of Saskatchewan, Canada (PBL Co-op of Canada) began preparations to import the first Piedmontese cattle into North America. There had been prior attempts at importation of the breed by the PBL Co-op of Canada and other cattle breeders, but the Italian Association was reluctant to sell any of their purebred breeding stock. Health protocols also created substantial levels of difficulty. The first successful importation occurred in the fall of 1979 with the arrival of five animals into Canada. (Note: The imports included a bull called "Brindisi", and four females named "Biba", "Banana", "Binda" and "Bisca".) Obtaining authorization and transfers to import the first five animals was the culmination of a half decade of effort, the cost of which is estimated at $100,000 per animal based on 2014 values. The following year, Canada received more Italian imports of Piedmontese cattle, including five more bulls. (Note: These imported bulls were named "Champ", "Captain", "Camino", "Corallo", and "Domingo".) The next year, Italian imports arrived in the US, including three additional sire lines and two cows. (Note: The bulls "Imbuto", "Instinto", and "Iosè" and two females, "Gazza" and "India".) It was from that genetic base that the North American breed of Piedmontese cattle began. In 1983, the Canadian Piedmontese Association (CPA) was formed, followed by the Piedmontese Association of the United States (PAUS) in 1984. By the 1990s, imports of semen and embryos were more substantial. Today there are several bloodlines available to cattle raisers in North America.

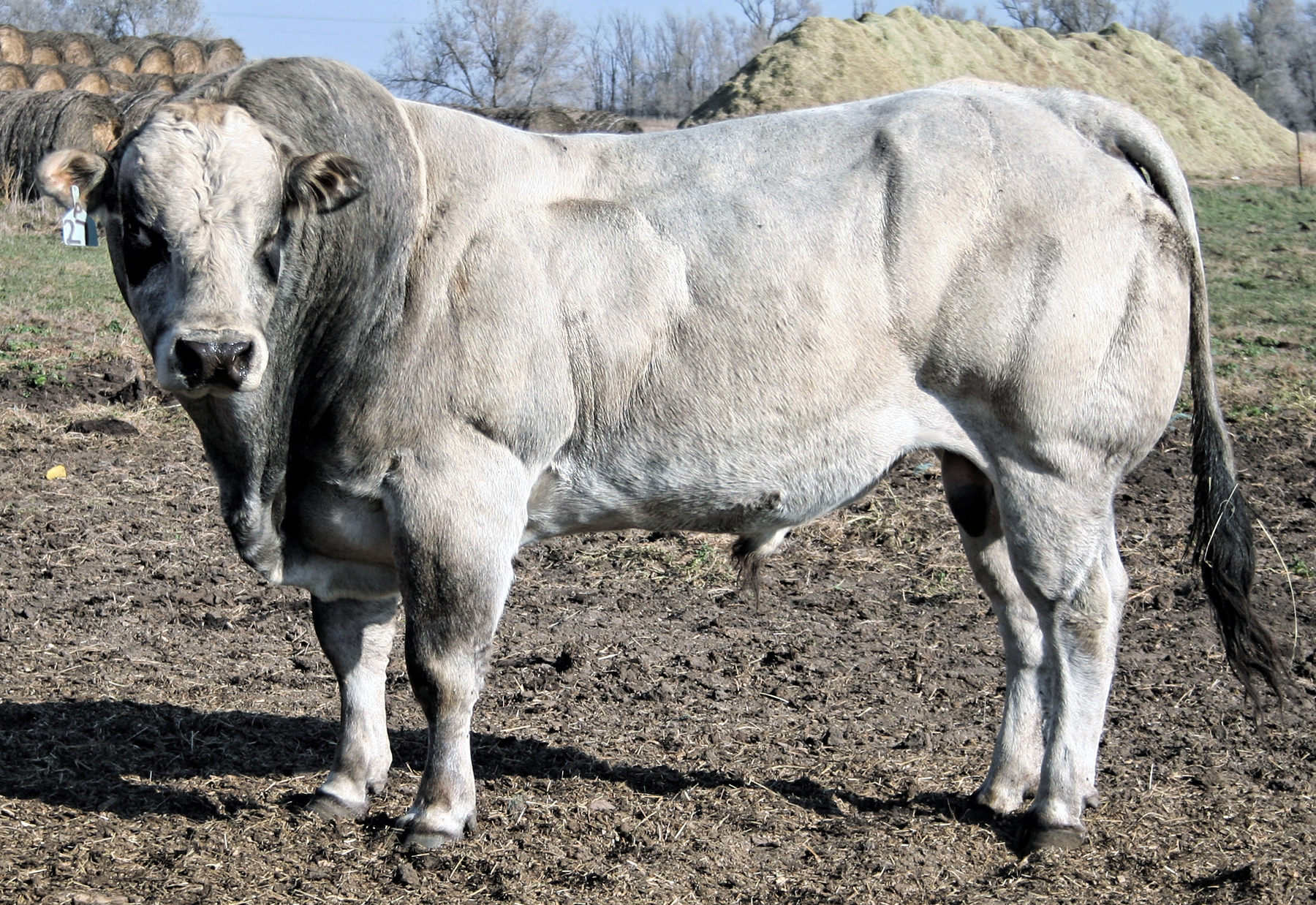
Dakota 27P, Fullblood North American Piedmontese bull

== Genetics and crossbreeding ==
Like the original Italian Piedmontese, North American Piedmontese cattle are distinguished genetically by the presence of the myostatin allele mutation which causes the breed's hypertrophic muscle growth, or "double muscling". According to an evaluation program at the U.S. Meat Animal Research Center, the birthing and survival rates of half-blood Piedmontese cattle were similar to Hereford x Angus cross calves, producing an average birth weight of 80.2 lbs. with 92.5% unassisted calving. The survival rate to weaning was 91.1%.

Compared with normal breeds of beef cattle, North American Piedmontese cattle are more proficient in converting feed into lean muscle. They also produce a higher percentage of the most desirable cuts of meat. They average 20% more muscle with less bone and fat. Research indicates that there is less connective tissue within the muscle of "double-muscled" cattle; this would imply less background toughness and therefore more tender meat.

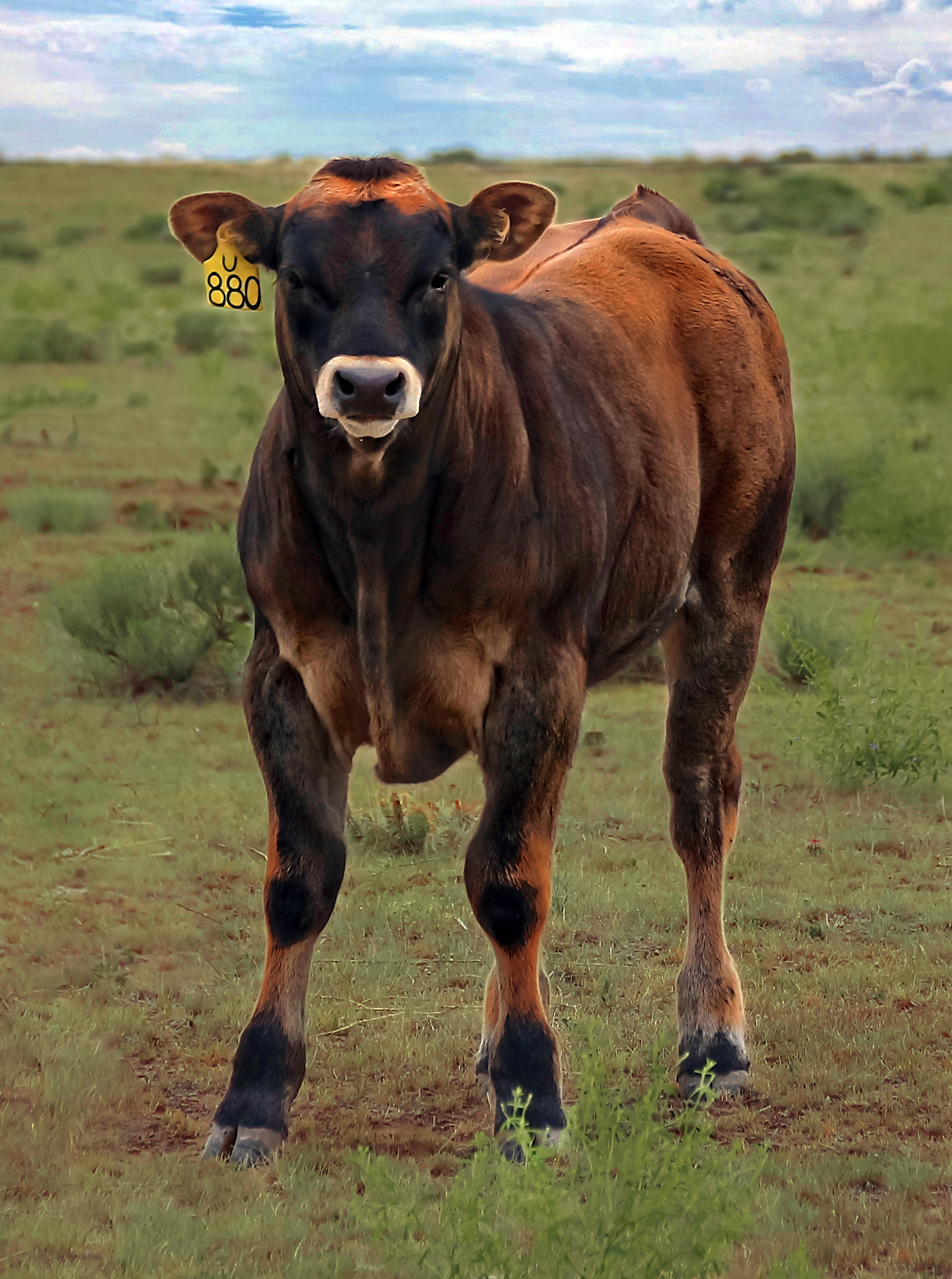
Naturalean bull calf already showing desired double muscling

== Prevalence among United States cattle ==
There are an estimated 28–30 million head of cattle currently in the United States. Of that total, nearly 70% of all beef cattle are derived from Angus cattle. Less than one-half of one percent are Piedmontese, or bred to Piedmontese cattle. As of 2014, the number of registered Piedmontese pure-blood breeding stock in the United States is estimated to be around 2,900 head.

In the United States Piedmontese beef is regulated by the USDA, which requires that organisations involved in the sale of Piedmontese beef meet labeling and nutritional verification requirements.

== Characteristics ==
The color of fullblood Piedmontese males is gray-white with a considerable amount of black hairs on the head, most notable around the eyes, neck, shoulders, and on the distal regions of the legs. They occasionally have dark stains or spots on their hind legs or lateral faces of the trunk. The cows are primarily white with varying shades of gray or light red. Calves are born a pale fawn color which changes to gray-white as they mature. Fullbloods are naturally horned, and have black pigmentation on the muzzle, eyelids, ears, tongue, tassel of the tail, anal opening, and on the outer skin of the sexual organs.

The color of Naturalean composites or crossbred cattle can be solid black or solid red with black or reddish pigmentation in the same areas as the pigmentation on fullbloods. They may be horned or polled, and homozygous (2 copy), or heterozygous (1 copy). Fullbloods and Naturalean bulls are often crossed with traditional beef breeds like Black Angus or Hereford cattle because of substantial benefits in the crossbred results, including a higher protein meat that is lower in saturated fat, improved tenderness, and an approximate 7% yield increase in salable carcass. Calving problems are also reduced in the crossbreds.

== North American Piedmontese Association (NAPA) ==
The North American Piedmontese Association (NAPA) was organized in September 2000, and is one of two official breed registry for North American Piedmontese cattle. It is a member-based, nonprofit breed registry headquartered in Washington, U.S., and the first cattle breed registry with mandatory registration requirements based on the presence of the Piedmontese-specific myostatin allele mutation. There are different categories of registration and recordation within the registry. Only homozygous animals (2 copy) can be registered, therefore breed true, and are eligible for registration in either the Fullblood (based on pedigree record), or Naturalean divisions.

The Naturalean division is for Piedmontese cattle that are either crossbred or could have qualified for Fullblood registration but failed to meet the pedigree requirements, perhaps because of unregistered or unverified parentage. Prior to registration or recording, DNA testing is required to confirm the animal carries at least 1 copy of the Piedmontese-specific myostatin gene. (Note: According to NAPA, "Naturalean™ registration papers are printed on grey paper, and carry the registration number prefix of 'N' or 'NU'. The 'NU' prefix indicates that the registered pedigree information is in-complete." Fullblood registrations are printed on white paper and do not have a prefix before the registration number, unless the animal is designated Embryo Transfer (ET).) Naturalean animals that are DNA tested heterozygous (1-copy) are not registered, rather they are issued a registration number with the prefix "recorded". The 0-copy (non-carriers) cattle are ineligible for registration in any category.

According to the North American Piedmontese Cattle Association, in the last decade of the 20th century, there was a noticeable upsurge in the importation of genetic material (i.e., embryos and semen). Thus, it is said that "there are now a wealth of blood lines" available from which to choose.

== See also ==
- Belgian Blue
