= Piemontese (disambiguation) =

Piemontese (English Piedmontese) is a Romance language spoken in northwestern Italy.

Piemontese may also refer to:

- People or things relating to Piedmont (Piemonte in Italian)
- Piemontese cattle
- Tarocco Piemontese, a tarot card deck

== See also ==
- French frigate Piémontaise (1804)
- Piedmontese (disambiguation)
