= Piedmontese (disambiguation) =

Piedmontese is a Romance language spoken in northwestern Italy.

Piedmontese may also refer to:

- People or things of or relating to Piedmont
- Piedmontese (cattle), a specific breed

== See also ==
- Piemontese (disambiguation)
- French frigate Piémontaise (1804)
