= Myostatin =

Mammalian and avian protein

MSTN

Identifiers
- Aliases: MSTN, GDF8, MSLHP, myostatin
- External IDs: OMIM: 601788; MGI: 95691; GeneCards: MSTN
Available structures
PDB	Ortholog search: PDBe RCSB
PDB	List of PDB id codes 3HH2, 3SEK

Gene location (Human)
Chr.	Chromosome 2 (human)
Band	2q32.2	Start	190,055,700 bp
Band	2q32.2	End	190,062,729 bp

Gene location (Mouse)
Chr.	Chromosome 1 (mouse)
Band	1 C1.1|1 26.99 cM	Start	53,100,799 bp
Band	1 C1.1|1 26.99 cM	End	53,107,238 bp
RNA expression pattern
Bgee	Human / Mouse (ortholog); Top expressed in: testicle; vastus lateralis muscle; biceps brachii; muscle of thigh; ventricular zone; skeletal muscle tissue; gastrocnemius muscle; deltoid muscle; right adrenal cortex; left adrenal gland / Top expressed in: gastrocnemius muscle; muscle of thigh; quadriceps femoris muscle; extensor digitorum longus muscle; extraocular muscle; plantaris muscle; masseter muscle; tibialis anterior muscle; thoracic diaphragm; zone of skin; More reference expression data
BioGPS	n/a
Gene ontology
Molecular function	cytokine activity; heparin binding; protein binding; transforming growth factor beta receptor binding; growth factor activity; signaling receptor binding; protein homodimerization activity; identical protein binding
Cellular component	cytoplasm; extracellular region; extracellular space
Biological process	regulation of apoptotic process; negative regulation of protein kinase B signaling; negative regulation of myoblast differentiation; regulation of MAPK cascade; SMAD protein signal transduction; muscle cell cellular homeostasis; cell development; response to testosterone; positive regulation of pathway-restricted SMAD protein phosphorylation; muscle organ development; response to glucocorticoid; response to heat; response to electrical stimulus; negative regulation of myoblast proliferation; ovulation cycle process; cellular response to dexamethasone stimulus; negative regulation of muscle hypertrophy; response to estrogen; negative regulation of skeletal muscle satellite cell proliferation; positive regulation of transcription, DNA-templated; response to gravity; negative regulation of insulin receptor signaling pathway; skeletal muscle tissue regeneration; skeletal muscle atrophy; negative regulation of satellite cell differentiation; response to ethanol; negative regulation of skeletal muscle tissue growth; transforming growth factor beta receptor signaling pathway; response to muscle activity; negative regulation of kinase activity; regulation of signaling receptor activity; positive regulation of lamellipodium assembly; positive regulation of macrophage chemotaxis; myoblast migration involved in skeletal muscle regeneration
Sources:Amigo / QuickGO
Orthologs
Databases	NCBI: entry; OMA: entry
Species	Human	Mouse
Entrez	2660	17700
Ensembl	ENSG00000138379	ENSMUSG00000026100
UniProt	O14793	O08689
RefSeq (mRNA)	NM_005259	NM_010834
RefSeq (protein)	NP_005250	NP_034964
Location (UCSC)	Chr 2: 190.06 – 190.06 Mb	Chr 1: 53.1 – 53.11 Mb
PubMed search
- Wikidata
View/Edit Human	View/Edit Mouse

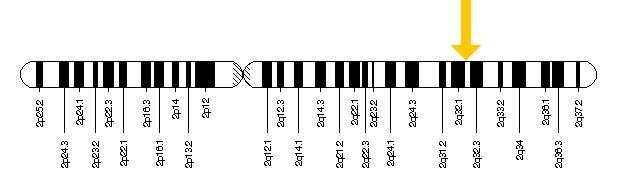
In humans, the MSTN gene is located on the long (q) arm of chromosome 2 at position 32.2.

Myostatin (also known as growth differentiation factor 8, abbreviated GDF8) is a protein that in humans is encoded by the MSTN gene. Myostatin is a myokine that is produced and released by myocytes and acts on muscle cells to inhibit muscle growth. Myostatin is a secreted growth differentiation factor that is a member of the TGF beta protein family.

Myostatin is assembled and produced in skeletal muscle before it is released into the blood stream. Most of the data regarding the effects of myostatin comes from studies performed on mice.

Animals either lacking myostatin or treated with substances that block the activity of myostatin have significantly more muscle mass. Furthermore, individuals who have mutations in both copies of the myostatin gene (popularly called the "Hercules gene") have significantly more muscle mass and are stronger than normal. There is hope that studies into myostatin may have therapeutic application in treating muscle wasting diseases such as muscular dystrophy.

== Discovery and sequencing ==
The gene encoding myostatin was discovered in 1997 by geneticists Se-Jin Lee and Alexandra McPherron who produced a knockout strain of mice that lack the gene, and have approximately twice as much muscle as normal mice. These mice were subsequently named "mighty mice".

Naturally occurring deficiencies of myostatin of various sorts have been identified in some breeds of cattle, sheep, whippets, and humans. In each case the result is a dramatic increase in muscle mass.

== Structure and mechanism of action ==
Human myostatin consists of two identical subunits, each consisting of 109 (NCBI database claims human myostatin is 375 residues long) amino acid residues [note the full length gene encodes a 375AA prepro-protein which is proteolytically processed to its shorter active form]. Its total molecular weight is 25.0 kDa. The protein is inactive until a protease cleaves the NH2-terminal, or "pro-domain" portion of the molecule, resulting in the active COOH-terminal dimer. Myostatin binds to the activin type II receptor, resulting in a recruitment of either coreceptor Alk-3 or Alk-4. This coreceptor then initiates a cell signaling cascade in the muscle that includes the activation of transcription factors in the SMAD family—SMAD2 and SMAD3. These factors then induce myostatin-specific gene regulation. When applied to myoblasts, myostatin inhibits their proliferation and either initiates differentiation or stimulates quiescence.

In mature muscle, myostatin inhibits Akt, a kinase that is sufficient to cause muscle hypertrophy, in part through the activation of protein synthesis while stimulating the production of ubiquitin ligases, proteins that regulate muscle protein breakdown. However, Akt is not responsible for all of the observed muscle hypertrophic effects, which are mediated by myostatin inhibition. Thus myostatin acts in two ways: by inhibiting Akt-induced protein synthesis and stimulating ubiquitin-regulated protein degradation.

== Biological advantage ==
Many different mammalian (including human) and avian species produce myostatin, indicating that the ability to produce myostatin was positively selected for.

== Effects in animals ==
=== Mutations ===
Mutations in myostatin do more than just affect the amount of muscle mass an organism can produce; they also have variable effects on other phenotypes for different species. For example, a Belgian Blue bovine with a mutation that inhibits myostatin production will exhibit a dramatic increase in muscle mass but will also lead to dystocia. Other species with myostatin deficiency mutation such as humans or Whippet dogs do not get obstructed labor.

=== Double-muscled cattle ===
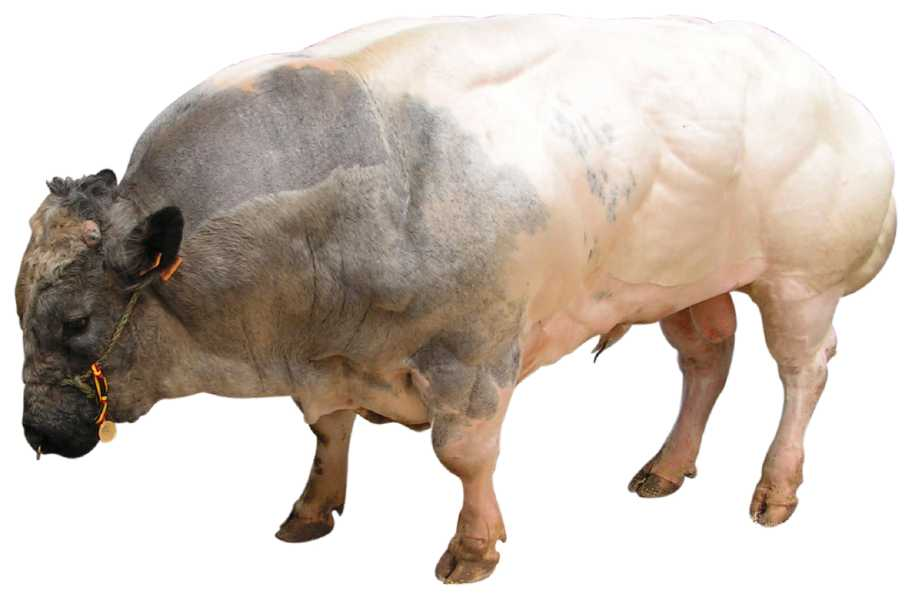
Belgian Blue cattle

After the discovery of the gene encoding myostatin in 1997, several laboratories cloned and established the nucleotide sequence of a myostatin gene in two breeds of cattle, Belgian Blue and Piedmontese. They found mutations in the myostatin gene (various mutations in each breed) which in one way or another lead to absence of functional myostatin. Unlike mice with a damaged myostatin gene, in these cattle breeds, muscle cells multiply rather than enlarge. People describe these cattle breeds as "double-muscled", but the total increase in all muscles is no more than 40%.

Animals lacking myostatin or animals treated with substances such as follistatin that block the binding of myostatin to its receptor have significantly larger muscles. Thus, reduction of myostatin could potentially benefit the livestock industry, with even a 20 percent reduction in myostatin levels potentially having a large effect on the development of muscles.

However, the animal breeds developed as homozygous for myostatin deficiency have reproduction issues due to their unusually heavy and bulky offspring, and require special care and a more expensive diet to achieve a superior yield. This negatively affects economics of myostatin-deficient breeds to the point where they do not usually offer an obvious advantage. While hypertrophic meat (e.g. from Piedmontese beef) has a place on the specialist market due to its high palatability and tenderness, at least for purebred myostatin-deficient strains the expenses and (especially in cattle) necessity of veterinary supervision place them at a disadvantage in the bulk market.

=== Whippets ===
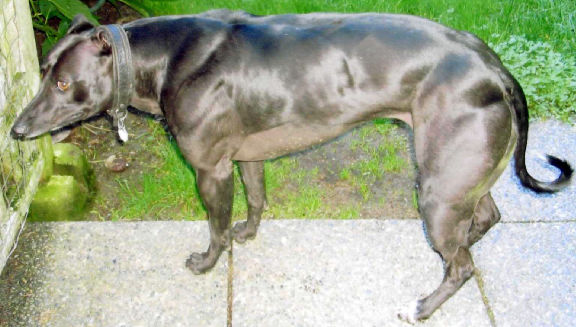
A "bully whippet" with a homozygous mutation in myostatin

Whippets can have a mutation of the myostatin which involves a two-base-pair deletion, and results in a truncated, and likely inactive, myostatin protein.

Animals with a homozygous deletion have an unusual body shape, with a broader head, pronounced overbite, shorter legs, and thicker tails, and are called "bully whippets" by the breeding community. Although significantly more muscular, they are less able runners than other whippets. However, whippets that were heterozygous for the mutation were significantly over-represented in the top racing classes. In 2015 scientist used CRISPR/Cas9 to have the same homozygous deletion in Beagles that appears in "bully whippets".

=== Mice ===
Mice that produce large amounts of myostatin exhibit a significant loss of skeletal muscle and body fat compared to normal mice. Comparatively, mice that produced decreased levels of myostatin had more muscle mass, less adipose tissue, and were double the size of wild type mice.

=== Rabbits and goats ===
In 2016, the CRISPR/Cas9 system was used to genetically engineer rabbits and goats with no functional copies of the myostatin gene. In both cases the resulting animals were significantly more muscular. However, rabbits without myostatin also exhibited an enlarged tongue, a higher rate of still births, and a reduced lifespan.

=== Pigs ===
A South Korean–Chinese team has engineered "double muscle" pigs, as with cattle, aiming for cheaper breeds for the meat market. Similar health problems have resulted as with other mammals, such as birthing difficulties due to excessive size.

=== Fish ===
Myostatin-disabled red sea breams grow to 1.2 the natural average size with the same amount of food and are sold as food in Japan by a startup.

== Clinical significance ==
=== Mutations ===
A technique for detecting mutations in myostatin variants has been developed. Mutations that reduce the production of functional myostatin lead to an overgrowth of muscle tissue. Myostatin-related muscle hypertrophy has an incomplete autosomal dominance pattern of inheritance. People with a mutation in both copies of the MSTN gene in each cell (homozygotes) have significantly increased muscle mass and strength. People with a mutation in one copy of the MSTN gene in each cell (heterozygotes) have increased muscle bulk, but to a lesser degree.

=== In humans ===
In 2004, a German boy was diagnosed with a mutation in both copies of the myostatin-producing gene, making him considerably stronger than his peers. His mother has a mutation in one copy of the gene.

An American boy born in 2005 was diagnosed with a clinically similar condition, but with a somewhat different cause: his body produces a normal level of functional myostatin, but because he is stronger and more muscular than most others his age, a defect in his myostatin receptors is thought to prevent his muscle cells from responding normally to myostatin. He appeared on the television show World's Strongest Toddler.

=== Therapeutic potential ===
Further research into myostatin and the myostatin gene may lead to therapies for muscular dystrophy. The idea is to introduce substances that block myostatin. A monoclonal antibody specific to myostatin increases muscle mass in mice and monkeys.

A two-week treatment of normal mice with soluble activin type IIB receptor, a molecule that is normally attached to cells and binds to myostatin, leads to a significantly increased muscle mass (up to 60%). It is thought that binding of myostatin to the soluble activin receptor prevents it from interacting with the cell-bound receptors. In September 2020 scientists reported that suppressing activin type 2 receptors-signalling proteins myostatin and activin A via activin A/myostatin inhibitor ACVR2B – tested preliminarily in humans in the form of ACE-031 in the early 2010s – can protect against both muscle and bone loss in mice. The mice were sent to the International Space Station and could largely maintain their muscle weights – about twice those of wild type due to genetic engineering for targeted deletion of the myostatin gene – under microgravity. Treating progeric mice with soluble activin receptor type IIB before the onset of premature ageing signs appear to protects against muscle loss and delay age related signs in other organs.

It remains unclear as to whether long-term treatment of muscular dystrophy with myostatin inhibitors is beneficial, as the depletion of muscle stem cells could worsen the disease later on. As of 2012, no myostatin-inhibiting drugs for humans are on the market. An antibody genetically engineered to neutralize myostatin, stamulumab, which was under development by pharmaceutical company Wyeth, is no longer under development. Some athletes, eager to get their hands on such drugs, turn to the internet where fake "myostatin blockers" are being sold.

Resistance exercise and creatine supplementation lead to greater decreases in myostatin levels.

Myostatin levels can be temporarily reduced using a cholesterol-conjugated siRNA gene knockdown.

=== Athletic use ===
Inhibition of myostatin leads to muscle hypertrophy. Myostatin inhibitors can improve athletic performance and therefore there is a concern these inhibitors might be abused in the field of sports. However, studies in mice suggest that myostatin inhibition does not directly increase the strength of individual muscle fibers. Myostatin inhibitors are specifically banned by the World Anti-Doping Agency (WADA). In an August 12, 2012, interview with NPR, Carlon Colker stated "when the myostatin inhibitors come along, they'll be abused. There's no question in my mind."

=== Lifestyle effects on myostatin ===
Myostatin expression is decreased in physically active individuals, while obesity is linked to having a higher level myostatin as well as plasma in circulation.

== Effects ==
=== On bone formation ===
Due to myostatin's ability to inhibit muscle growth, it can indirectly inhibit bone formation by decreasing the load on the bone. It has a direct signalling effect on bone formation as well as degradation. Knockdown of myostatin has been shown to reduce formation of osteoclasts (multinucleated cells responsible for the breakdown of bone tissue) in mice modeling rheumatoid arthritis. Rheumatoid arthritis is an autoimmune disorder that, among other effects, leads to the degradation of the bone tissue in affected joints. Myostatin has not, however, been shown to be solely sufficient for the formation of mature osteoclasts from macrophages, only an enhancer.

Myostatin expression is increased around the site of a fracture. Suppression of myostatin at the fracture site leads to increased callus and overall bone size, further supporting the inhibitory effect of myostatin on bone formation. One study by Berno Dankbar et al., 2015 found that myostatin deficiency leads to a notable reduction in inflammation around a fracture site. Myostatin affects osteoclastogenesis by binding to receptors on osteoclastic macrophages and causing a signalling cascade. The downstream signalling cascade enhances the expression of RANKL-dependent integrin αvβ3, DC-STAMP, calcitonin receptors, and NFATc1 (which is part of the initial intracellular complex that starts the signaling cascade, along with R-Smad2 and ALK4 or ALK5).

An association between osteoporosis, another disease characterized by the degradation of bony tissue, and sarcopenia, the age-related degeneration of muscle mass and quality have also been found. Whether this link is a result of direct regulation or a secondary effect through muscle mass is not known.

A link in mice between the concentration of myostatin in the prenatal environment and the strength of offspring's bones, partially counteracting the effects of osteogenesis imperfecta (brittle bone disease) has been found. Osteogenesis imperfecta is due to a mutation that causes the production of abnormal Type I collagen. Mice with defective myostatin were created by replacing sequences coding for the C-terminal region of myostatin with a neomycin cassette, rendering the protein nonfunctional. By crossbreeding mice with the abnormal Type I collagen and those with the knockout myostatin, the offspring had "a 15% increase in torsional ultimate strength, a 29% increase in tensile strength, and a 24% increase in energy to failure" of their femurs as compared to the other mice with osteogenesis imperfecta, showing the positive effects of decreased myostatin on bone strength and formation.

=== On the heart ===
Myostatin is expressed at very low levels in cardiac myocytes. Although its presence has been noted in cardiomyocytes of both fetal and adult mice, its physiological function remains uncertain. However, it has been suggested that fetal cardiac myostatin may play a role in early heart development.

Myostatin is produced as promyostatin, a precursor protein kept inactive by the latent TGF-β binding protein 3 (LTBP3). Pathological cardiac stress promotes N-terminal cleavage by furin convertase to create a biologically active C-terminal fragment. The mature myostatin is then segregated from the latent complex via proteolytic cleavage by BMP-1 and tolloid metalloproteinases. Free myostatin is able to bind its receptor, ActRIIB, and increase SMAD2/3 phosphorylation. The latter produces a heteromeric complex with SMAD4, inducing myostatin translocation into the cardiomyocyte nucleus to modulate transcription factor activity. Manipulating the muscle creatinine kinase promoter can modulate myostatin expression, although it has only been observed in male mice thus far.

Myostatin may inhibit cardiomyocyte proliferation and differentiation by manipulating cell cycle progression. This argument is supported by the fact that myostatin mRNA is poorly expressed in proliferating fetal cardiomyocytes. In vitro studies indicate that myostatin promotes SMAD2 phosphorylation to inhibit cardiomyocyte proliferation. Furthermore, myostatin has been shown to directly prevent cell cycle G1 to S phase transition by decreasing levels of cyclin-dependent kinase complex 2 (CDK2) and by increasing p21 levels.

Growth of cardiomyocytes may also be hindered by myostatin-regulated inhibition of protein kinase p38 and the serine-threonine protein kinase Akt, which typically promote cardiomyocyte hypertrophy. However, increased myostatin activity only occurs in response to specific stimuli, such as in pressure stress models, in which cardiac myostatin induces whole-body muscular atrophy.

Physiologically, minimal amounts of cardiac myostatin are secreted from the myocardium into serum, having a limited effect on muscle growth. However, increases in cardiac myostatin can increase its serum concentration, which may cause skeletal muscle atrophy. Pathological states that increase cardiac stress and promote heart failure can induce a rise in both cardiac myostatin mRNA and protein levels within the heart. In ischemic or dilated cardiomyopathy, increased levels of myostatin mRNA have been detected within the left ventricle.

As a member of the TGF-β family, myostatin may play a role in post-infarct recovery. It has been hypothesized that hypertrophy of the heart induces an increase in myostatin as a negative feedback mechanism in an attempt to limit further myocyte growth. This process includes mitogen-activated protein kinases and binding of the MEF2 transcription factor within the promoter region of the myostatin gene. Increases in myostatin levels during chronic heart failure have been shown to cause cardiac cachexia. Systemic inhibition of cardiac myostatin with the JA-16 antibody maintains overall muscle weight in experimental models with pre-existing heart failure.

Myostatin also alters excitation-contraction (EC) coupling within the heart. A reduction in cardiac myostatin induces eccentric hypertrophy of the heart, and increases its sensitivity to beta-adrenergic stimuli by enhancing Ca^{2+} release from the SR during EC coupling. Also, phospholamban phosphorylation is increased in myostatin-knockout mice, leading to an increase in Ca^{2+} release into the cytosol during systole. Therefore, minimizing cardiac myostatin may improve cardiac output.

== See also ==
- Muscular dystrophy
- Muscle hypertrophy
- Myostatin-related muscle hypertrophy
- Superhuman strength
