= Belgian Blue =

Belgian breed of beef cattle

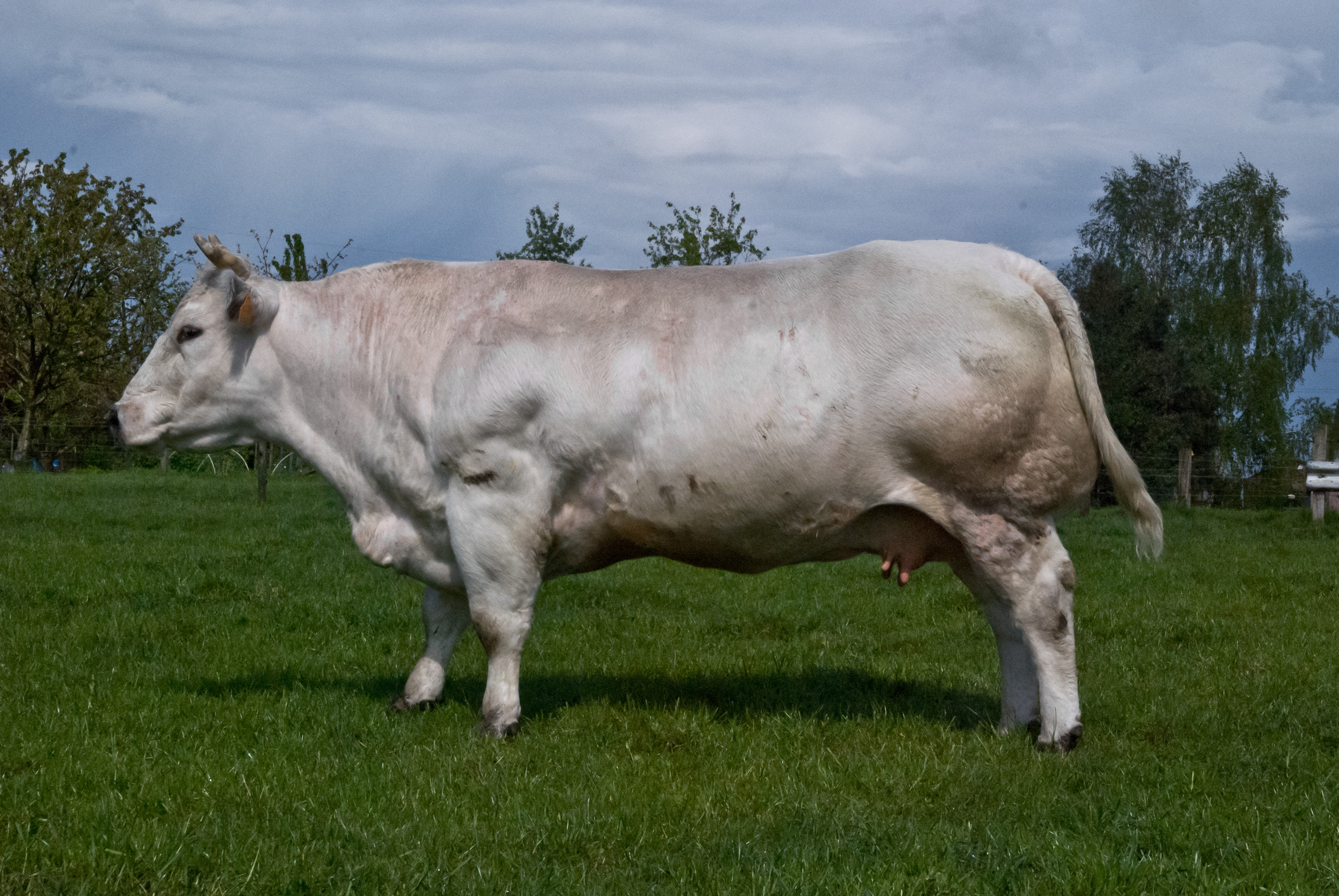
- Conservation status: FAO (2007): not at risk; DAD-IS (2022): not at risk
- Country of origin: Belgium
- Distribution: Africa, Americas, Europe, Oceania
- Standard: Herd-Book Blanc-Bleu Belge (in French)
- Use: two types, beef and dual-purpose

Traits
- Weight: Male: average 1200 kg; Female: average 700 kg
- Height: Male: average 148 cm; Female: average 132 cm
- Cattle; Bos (primigenius) taurus

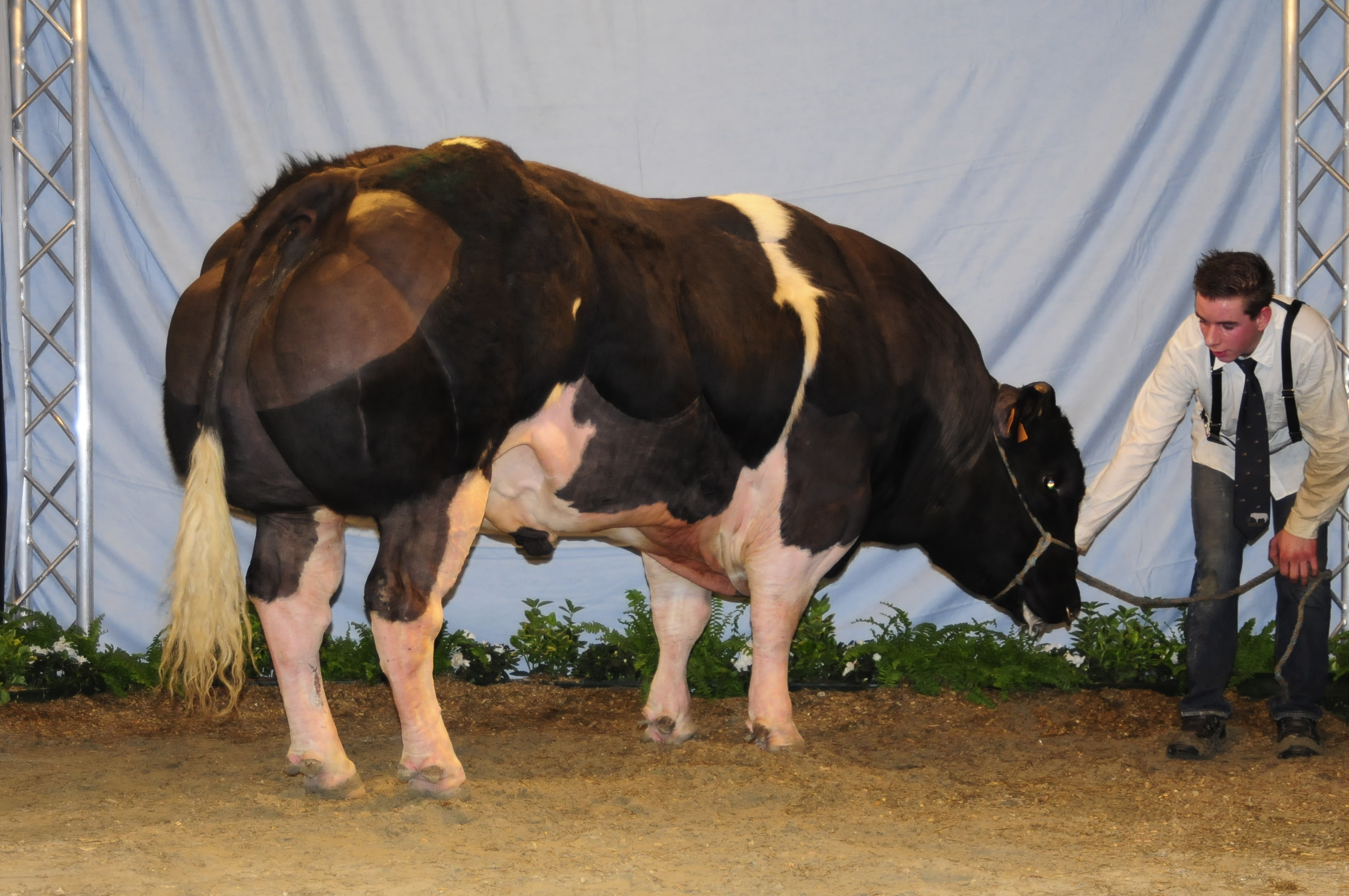
Belgian Blue bull

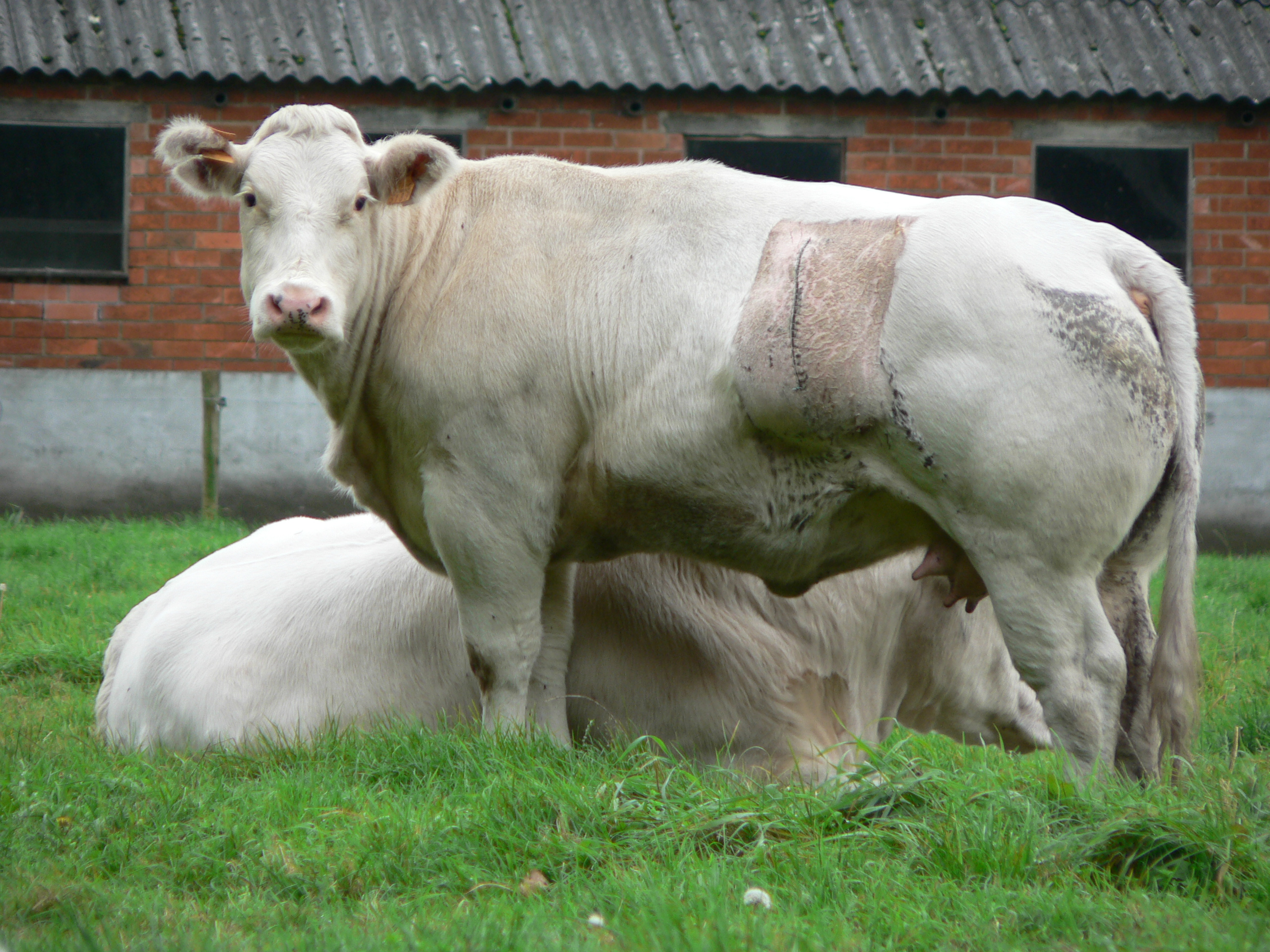
Cow with the scars from caesarean sections

The Belgian Blue (French: 'Blanc-Bleu Belge', Dutch: 'Belgisch Witblauw', both literally meaning "Belgian White-Blue") is a breed of beef cattle from Belgium. It may also be known as the Race de la Moyenne et Haute Belgique, or dikbil (lit. "fat buttocks" in Dutch). Alternative names for this breed include Belgian Blue-White; Belgian White and Blue Pied; Belgian White Blue; Blue; and Blue Belgian. The Belgian Blue's extremely lean, hyper-sculpted, ultra-muscular physique is termed "double-muscling". The double-muscling phenotype is a heritable condition caused by a deletion in the myostatin gene, resulting in an increased number of muscle fibres (hyperplasia), instead of the (normal) enlargement of individual muscle fibres (hypertrophy).

This particular trait is shared with another breed of cattle known as Piedmontese. Both of these breeds have an increased ability to convert feed into lean muscle, which causes these particular breeds' meat to have a reduced fat content and increased tenderness. The Belgian Blue is named after its typically blue-grey mottled hair colour; however, its actual colour can vary from white to black.

== History ==
The breed originated in central and upper Belgium in the 19th century, from crossing local breeds with a Shorthorn breed of cattle from the United Kingdom. Charolais cattle possibly were cross-bred, as well. Belgian Blue cattle were first used as a dairy and beef breed. The modern beef breed was developed in the 1950s by Professor Hanset, working at an artificial insemination centre in Liège Province. The breed's characteristic gene mutation was maintained through linebreeding to the point where the condition was a fixed property in the Belgian Blue breed. In 1978, Belgian Blue cattle were introduced to the United States by Nick Tutt, a farmer from central Canada who emigrated to West Texas and showed the cattle to universities in the region.

The Belgian Blue has been exported to many parts of the world; it is reported to DAD-IS by twenty-four countries, in Africa, the Americas, Europe and Oceania. Of these, ten report population data; in 2022 the worldwide population was estimated to be 107875.

== Characteristics ==
The Belgian Blue has a natural mutation in the myostatin gene which codes for the protein, myostatin ("myo" meaning muscle and "statin" meaning stop). Myostatin is a protein that inhibits muscle development. This mutation also interferes with fat deposition, resulting in very lean meat. The truncated myostatin gene is unable to function in its normal capacity, resulting in accelerated lean muscle growth. Muscle growth is due primarily to physiological changes in the animal's muscle cells (fibres) from hypertrophy to a hyperplasia mode of growth. This particular type of growth is seen early in the fetus of a pregnant dam, which results in a calf that is born with two times the number of muscle fibres at birth than a calf with no myostatin gene mutation. In addition, a newborn double-muscled calf's birth weight is significantly greater than that of a normal calf.

Belgian Blue cattle have improved feed conversion ratio (FCR) due to lower feed intake compared to weight gain due to an altered composition of body weight gain which includes increased protein and decreased fat deposition. The Belgian Blue's bone structure is the same as normal cattle, albeit holding a greater amount of muscle, which causes them to have a greater meat to bone ratio. These cattle have a muscle yield around 20% more on average than cattle without the genetic myostatin mutation. Because of this breed's increased muscle yield, a diet containing higher protein is required to compensate for the altered mode of weight gain. During finishing, this breed requires high-energy (concentrated) feeds, and will not yield the same results if put on a high-fibre diet.

== Breed problems ==
Double-muscled cows routinely experience dystocia – difficulty in parturition – even when bred to normal beef bulls or dairy bulls, because of a narrower birth canal; the birth weight and width of the calf also may be higher than in animals without the double-muscling gene. Calves are commonly born by Caesarean section; cows may be able to survive five or six deliveries of this type.

In bulls, testicular weight and semen quantity and quality are lower than in other cattle, perhaps because of the greater amount of connective tissue in the testicles. However, this is less of an issue when compared to the dam's difficulties in calving.

== Economic efficiency ==
The economics of breeding and raising Belgian Blue cattle are inconclusive because of complications experienced during parturition and metabolic demand for more concentrated feeds. The breed's increased need to have Caesarean sections when calving means increased cost and added work, and can become a welfare issue. However, the carcass value of double-muscled animals may be enhanced due to increased dressing yield, lean carcass content, and upgrading of some cuts leading to a higher proportion of higher valued cuts. The slower rate of fat deposition causes slaughtering to be delayed in most cases, which means an increase in maintenance costs in those animals. Belgian Blue cattle require more skilled management and do not thrive in harsh environments. For these reasons and others, the breed's overall production efficiency in an economic sense is still unclear.
