= Piedmontese cattle =

Breed of cattle

Piedmontese
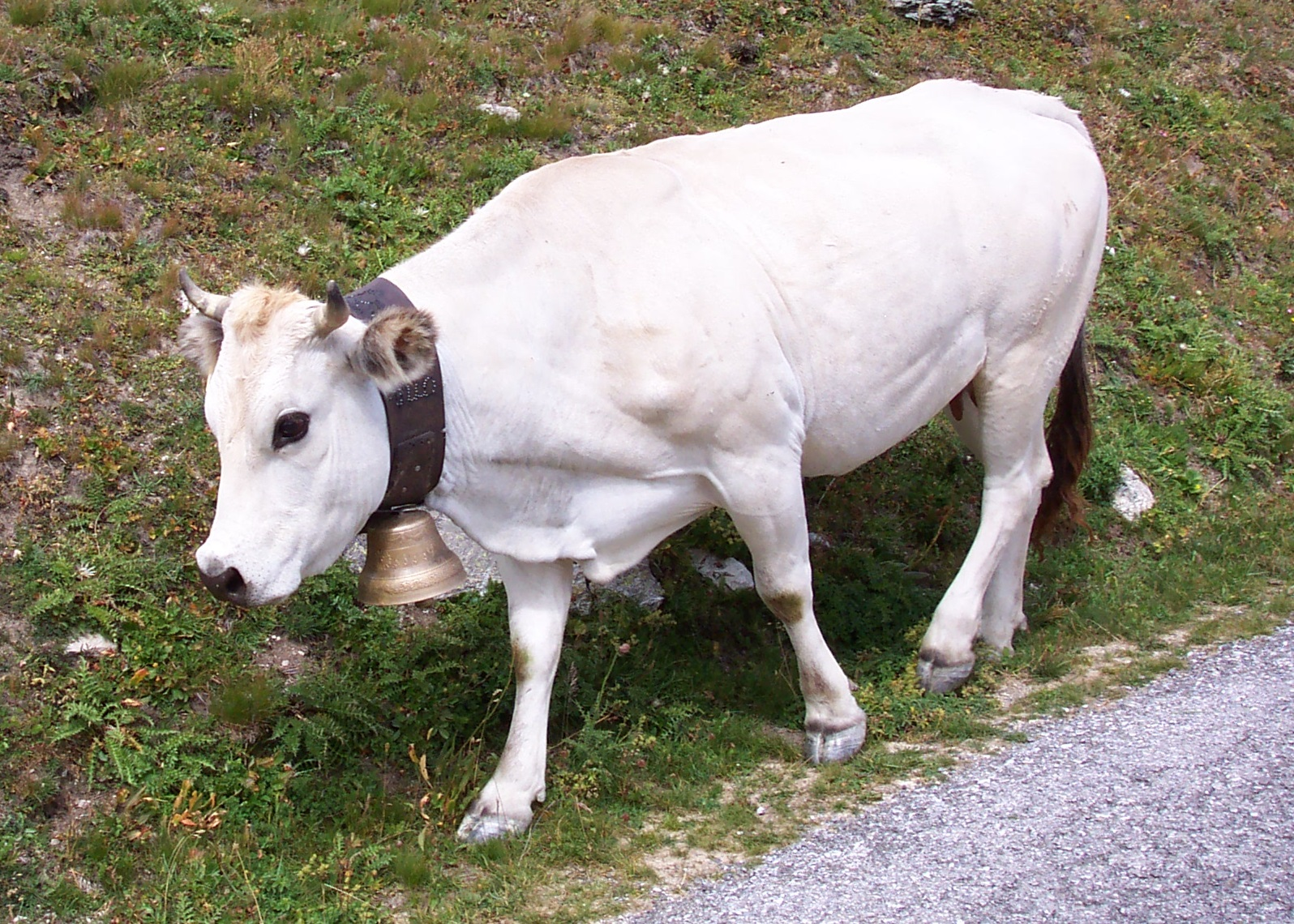
- A Piedmontese cow on Alpine pasture near Castelmagno
- Other names: Piemontese
- Country of origin: Italy: Piemonte region
- Distribution: world-wide
- Standard: ANABORAPI (Italy)
- Use: Formerly triple-purpose, draught, meat and milk; now raised primarily for meat

Traits
- Weight: Male: 700–850 kg; Female: 520–550 kg
- Height: Male: 130–135 cm; Female: 131–132 cm
- Coat: white or wheaten with grey shading; black skin and switch
- Horn status: horned

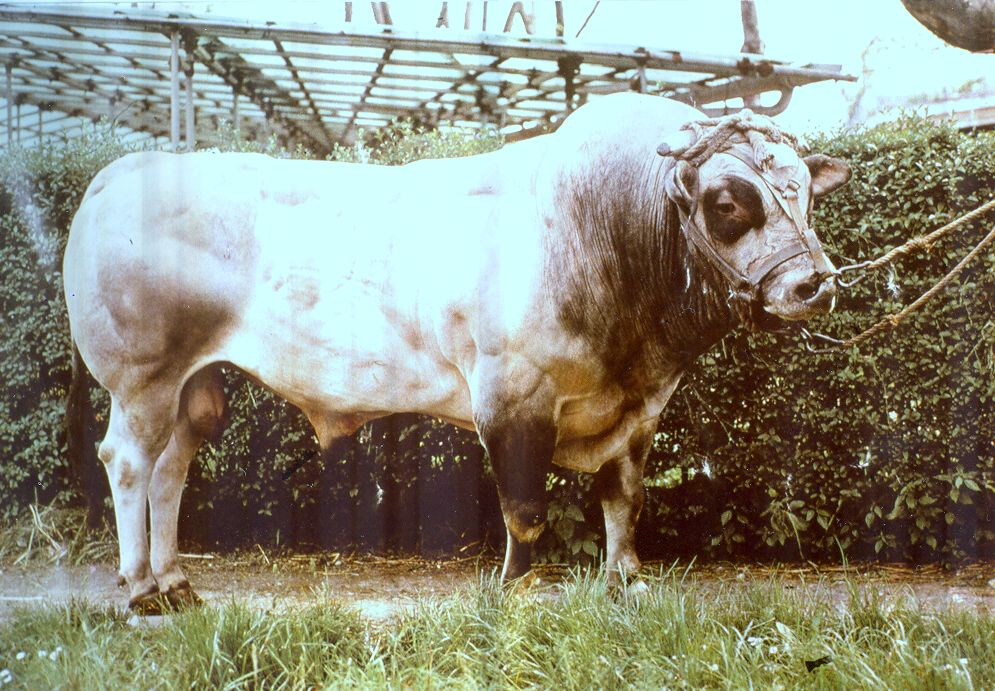
A Piedmontese bull

The Piedmontese (Italian: Piemontese or razza bovina Piemontese) is a breed of domestic cattle that originated in the region of Piedmont, in north-west Italy. The calves are born fawn coloured, and turn grey-white as they mature. Piedmontese cattle carry a unique gene mutation (also present in Belgian Blue), identified as an inactive myostatin allele that causes hypertrophic muscle growth, or double muscling. Purebred Piedmontese cattle are homozygous, meaning they have two identical alleles present for this unique gene. They have garnered attention from breeders of beef cattle in other parts of the world, including North and South America. A small group of select Piedmontese bulls and cows were imported into Canada in the late 1970s, and into the United States in the early 1980s, and were used as the foundation breeding stock to develop a new breed of beef cattle known as North American Piedmontese cattle.

== History ==
Until the late nineteenth century there were numerous local types of Piedmontese cattle, including the Canavese, the Della Langa, the Demonte, the Ordinario di Pianura and the Scelta di Pianura. They were triple-purpose cattle, raised principally for draught power, but valued also for meat and milk. A herd-book was opened in 1877, selective breeding towards a dual-purpose type began, and the Piedmontese became relatively uniform in character. The postpartum hypertrophic muscle growth characteristic, known as "groppa di cavallo" or "horse rump", first appeared in 1886 in the comune of Guarene d'Alba. It was not in accordance with the then breed standard, and only later attracted the interest of breeders and scientists.

At the beginning of the twentieth century there were about 680,000 Piedmontese cattle in Italy; by 1985 this had fallen to about 600,000. In 1957 the number registered in the herd-book was 851; by the end of 2011 it had risen to 267,243. In 2008 the total number in Italy was estimated at 300,000, of which 230,000 were registered.

== Use ==
In Italy, the Piedmontese is a dual-purpose breed: the cattle are raised for their milk, which is used in the production of several traditional cheeses of the region, including Castelmagno, Bra, Raschera, and Toma Piemontese; and are also raised for meat, as beef from Piedmontese cattle is seen as a premium product.

== Muscular hypertrophy ==
Piedmontese beef is meat from cattle having one or two copies of the inactive myostatin gene. This attribute provides a higher lean-to-fat ratio, as well as less marbling with less connective tissue than meat from cattle having the "active" version of the gene. The active-myostatin gene acts as a "governor" on muscle growth; myostatin is a protein that instructs muscles to stop growing. In effect, when inactive, as it is with Piedmontese cattle, it no longer prevents muscle development which is what allows for the hypertrophic condition sometimes referred to as "double muscling".

Animal breeds developed as homozygous for myostatin deficiency may have reproduction problems due to their unusually heavy and bulky offspring, and require a more expensive diet and special care, including veterinary supervision. These factors may make it uneconomic to raise them. Piedmontese beef has a place in the specialist market because of its unusual properties, but may be at a disadvantage in the bulk market.

== See also ==
- Belgian Blue
