= Pie Rouge des Plaines =

French breed of cattle

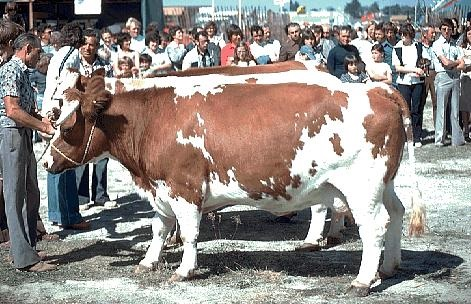
- Country of origin: France
- Distribution: Brittany; Normandy; Massif Central
- Use: dual-purpose, milk and meat

Traits
- Weight: Male: 900–1100 kg; Female: 700–800 kg
- Height: Male: 155 cm; Female: 144 cm
- Skin colour: beige
- Coat: red-pied
- Horn status: horned in both sexes
- Cattle; Bos (primigenius) taurus

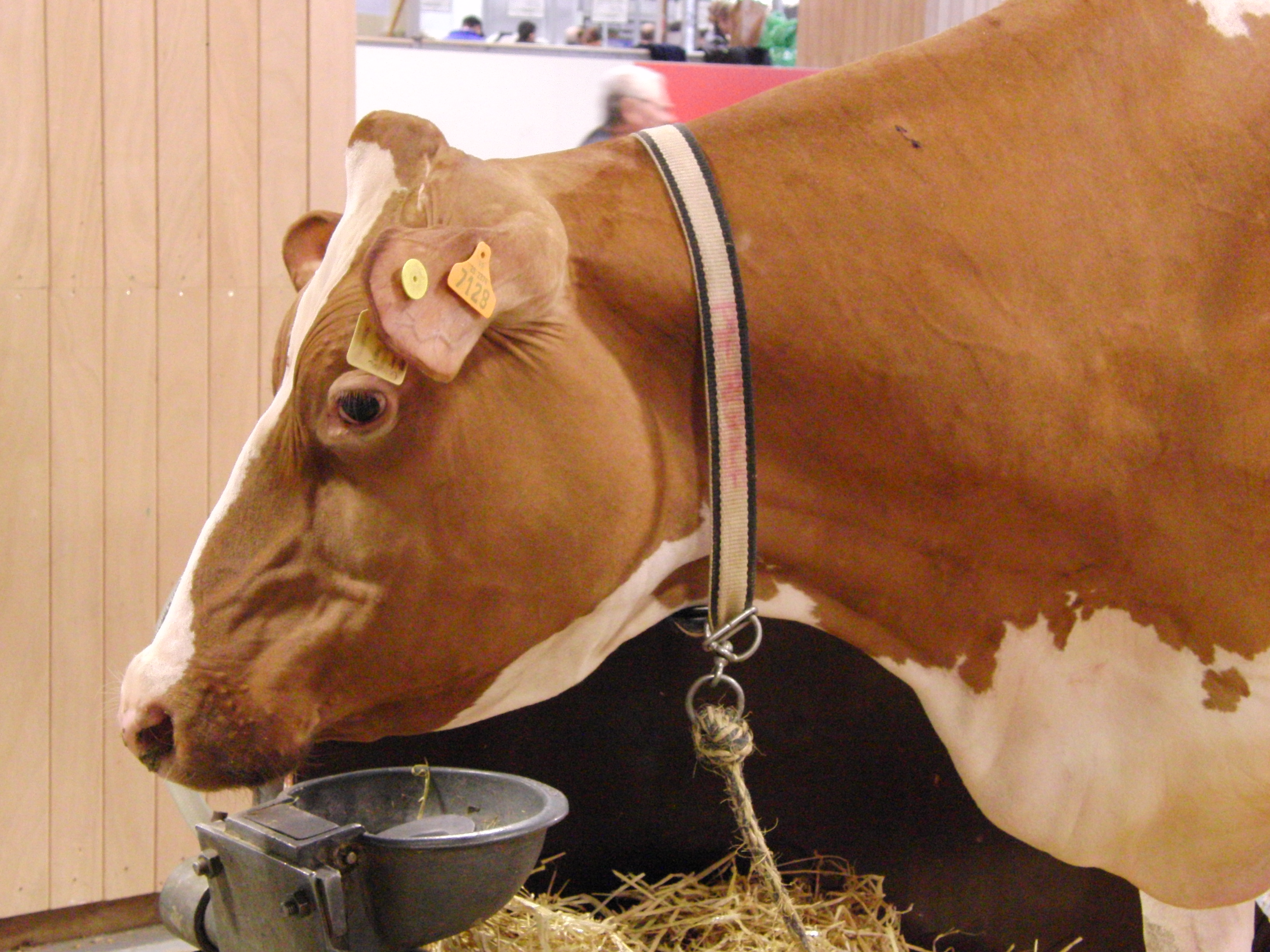
Cow at the Salon International de l'Agriculture in Paris in 2014

The Pie Rouge des Plaines (French pronunciation: [pi ʁuʒ de plɛn]) is a modern French breed of dairy cattle. It was created in about 1970 by cross-breeding the traditional Armorican cattle of Brittany, in north-western France, with red-pied cattle of the Dutch Meuse-Rhine-Yssel and German Deutsche Rotbunte breeds.

== History ==
The Pie Rouge des Plaines is a modern breed. In 1970, farmers raising the traditional red-pied Armorican cattle in the three western départements of Brittany – Côtes-d'Armor, Finistère and the Morbihan – took the decision to merge their breed with red-pied cattle of Germany and the Netherlands, through a programme of extensive cross-breeding with German Rotbunt and Dutch Meuse-Rhine-Yssel stock, to create a new dairy breed with good meat-producing qualities. A breeders' association, the Eleveurs de la Race Française Pie Rouge des Plaines, was formed, and a herd-book was opened for the new breed in 1970 or 1971. From 1982 an attempt was made to increase size and udder quality by introducing Red Holstein blood; however, the resulting stock was less successful for beef production.

The Pie Rouge des Plaines is concentrated mainly in Brittany, where about 80% of the total herd is found; it is also distributed in Normandy, and – to a lesser extent – in the Massif Central. In 2015 the total population was estimated to be in the range 62500–67500, with approximately 25000 breeding cows, of which about 3500 were registered in the herd-book. Frozen semen from some 150 bulls was available for artificial insemination.

The original Armorican breed has become rare: it was listed by the FAO as "critically endangered" in 2007. The population was estimated in 2005 to be in the range 230–248 head, and in 2014 was reported at 263.

== Characteristics ==
The Pie Rouge des Plaines is red-pied, with short crescent-shaped horns. The skin, muzzle and mucosa are pale. Cows have good resistance to mastitis.

== Use ==
Pie Rouge des Plaines has good dairy aptitude: milk yield is of the order of 8000 kg in a lactation of 329 days; the milk has 4.3% fat and 3.3% protein. Meat production also contributes to profitability.
