= Violette Pianel-Couriaut =

French ice hockey player (born 2006)

- Born: May 9, 2006 (age 20) Annecy, France
- Height: 1.73 m (5 ft 8 in)
- Weight: 68 kg (150 lb; 10 st 10 lb)
- Position: Goaltender
- Catches: Left
- U20 Élite team: Villard-de-Lans Ours
- National team: France

Violette Pianel-Couriaut (born 9 May 2006) is a French ice hockey goaltender. She plays for Villard-de-Lans Ours and has represented France internationally, including at the women's ice hockey tournament at the 2026 Winter Olympics.

== Early life ==
Pianel-Couriaut is from Annecy and developed as a goaltender in France before joining the Villard-de-Lans programme.

== Playing career ==
=== Club ===
Pianel-Couriaut has played in the Villard-de-Lans system and has also appeared in French junior competitions, including the U20 level.

=== International ===
Pianel-Couriaut has represented France internationally at the under-18 level and at the 2026 Winter Olympics. At the 2026 Olympic women's tournament, she appeared in two games for France.

== Career statistics ==
=== Regular season and playoffs ===
			Regular season								Playoffs
Season	Team	League	GP	W	L	T	SO	GAA	SV%	TOI	GP	W	L	T	SO	GAA	SV%	TOI
2023–24	Villard-de-Lans U17	France U17	8	1	5	0	0	5.21	—	427	—	—	—	—	—	—	—	—
2024–25	Villard-de-Lans U20	France U20	10	2	4	0	0	4.96	—	412	—	—	—	—	—	—	—	—

=== International ===
Year	Team	Event	Result	GP
2024	France	U18 (Div I-A)	—	—
2026	France	Olympics	10th	2
