= Villard-de-Lans (cattle breed) =

French cattle breed

Villarde-de-Lans
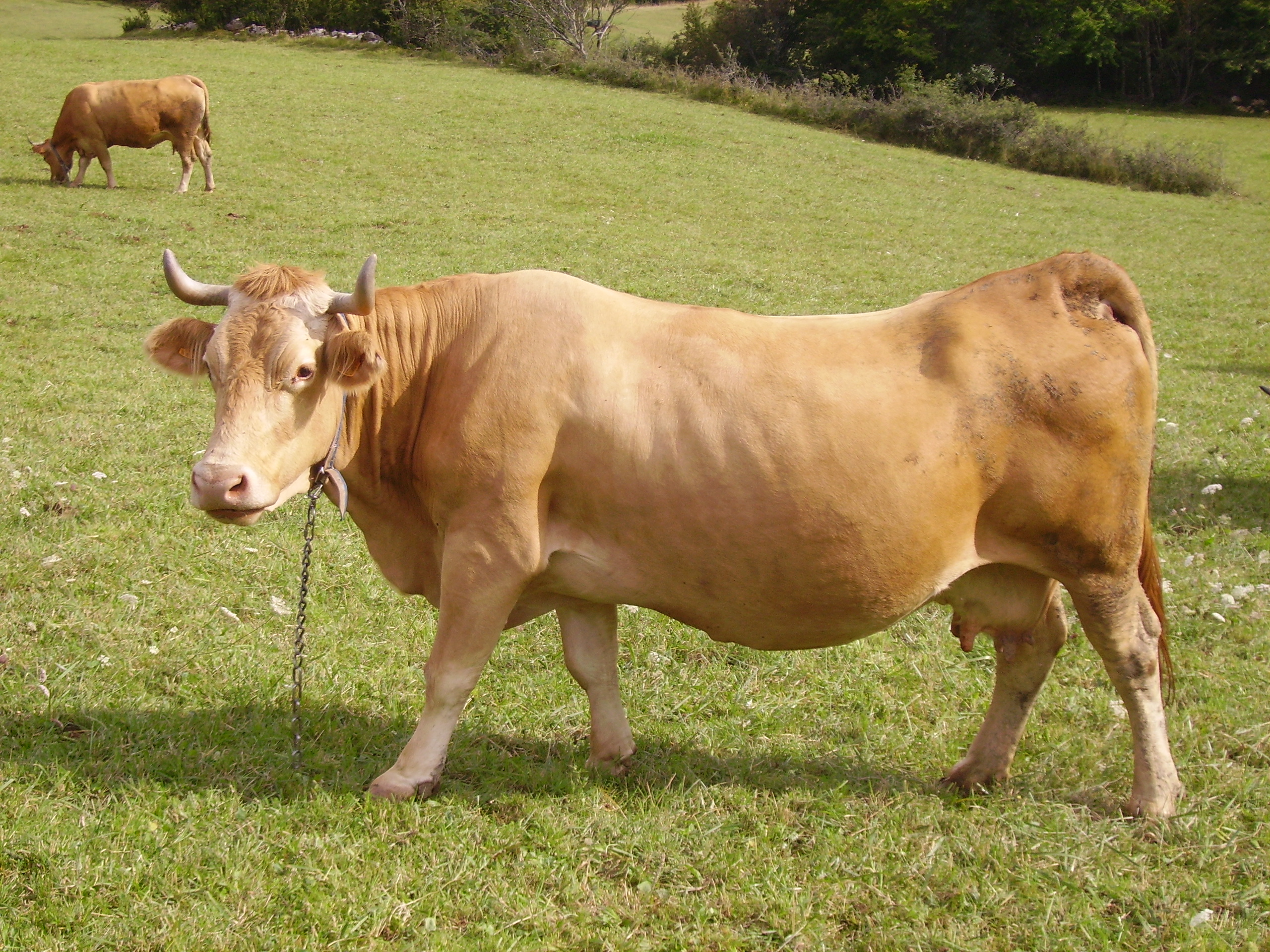
- Villarde-de-Lans cow
- Country of origin: France, Vercors region.
- Use: Mixed

Traits
- Height: Tall
- Coat: Uniform

Notes
- Local diffusion, preserved breed

The Villard-de-Lans, or villarde, is a French cattle breed native to the outskirts of the homonymous town in the Vercors mountain pass within the French Prealps. This wheat-colored cow was for many years used for agricultural labor, milking and meat production, before World War II and the industrialization of cattle breeds led to its decline.

From the late 1970s onwards, efforts began to save this breed. By the early 21st century, numbers were slowly increasing again. Today, the breed is mainly used for milk production and is one of the breeds authorized to produce the AOC Bleu du Vercors-Sassenage cheese.

== History ==
=== Origins ===
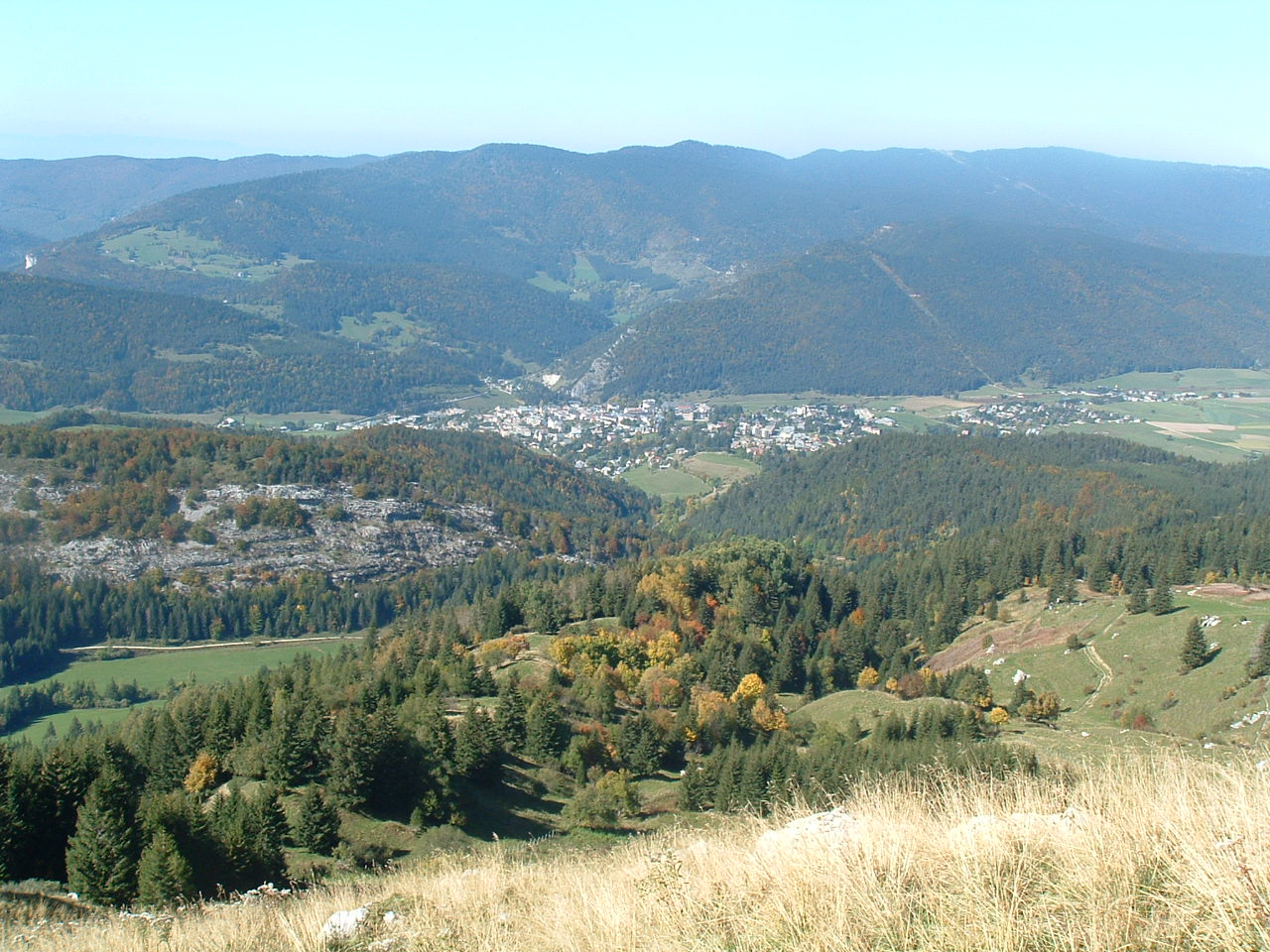
Villard-de-Lans and its surroundings, birthplace of the eponymous breed.

The origin of the Villard-de-Lans is a controversial topic. Some link it to the now extinct Mézine breed, and thus to the breeds of the Massif Central. It would then be the last representative of the southeastern blond breed, a variety to the blond et rouge breed, which is widely represented in southern Europe. However, only its color is similar to that of the Mezenc breed, which has a very different morphology. For this reason, the Villard-de-Lans is frequently associated with animals from the Jurassic branch, that is, the ones related to the Jura Mountains. Some authors even state that it is the result of crosses between cattle from the Jurassic branch and Alpine cattle. Nevertheless, it is generally agreed that the breed's creation is linked to the relative isolation of the animals in northern Vercors, a mountain chain in the southern Alps, whose main town is named after the breed. It was here that the population slowly settled down to develop their own distinct breed.

In the 19th century, cattle breeding was well established in the Vercors, particularly in the northern part of the mountain chain, in the Villard-de-Lans canton. By 1748, there were 260 oxen and 576 cows, whereas, in the southern part of the mountain chain, there were mainly oxen imported from the Vivarais region and very few cows. The high percentage of cows is linked to the importance of milk production in the canton, which is far less isolated than the southern part of the massif and therefore more suited to this type of activity. As a result, milk production developed strongly in the second half of the 18th century. Between 1748 and 1809, the number of cows in the communes of Villard-de-Lans, Lans-en-Vercors and Méaudre rose from 402 to 1,603.

The breed was first mentioned in 1832, when a Grenoble veterinary surgeon observed several cattle with similar characteristics grouped together, notably in the former Villard-de-Lans canton. In 1862, a request was made to have the breed officially recognized. Following consultation with experts from the National Veterinary School in Lyon, a positive response was received in 1863, but official recognition was not granted until 1864.

=== Rise ===
The creation of the Villard-de-Lans breed corresponds to the development of the Grenoble urban area. The ever-growing population of the city and its suburbs consumed meat and dairy products from neighboring rural cantons such as Villard-de-Lans. As a result, cattle production took off in this canton, supplanting sheep and goats, which were reputed to be responsible for the erosion and disappearance of forests. Fruitières were built to process milk production.

From 1864 onwards, the Villard-de-Lans was ever-present at competitions. That year, 153 Villard-de-Lans were shown for the first time at the Grenoble regional show, among 420 animals exhibited. The proportion of Villard-de-Lans entries increased steadily over time. In 1895, the breed was admitted to the national show in Paris, and a special section was opened in 1912. A special breed competition was also held in Grenoble between 1894 and 1914. During this period, the breed developed strongly, reaching 15,000 heads at its peak in 1943, of which almost 7,000 were bred in the Villard-de-Lans canton.

=== Fall ===
The breed went into rapid decline from the end of the Second World War, for a number of reasons. Firstly, it fell victim to German repression of the Battle of Vercors in the summer of 1944. The Germans devastated the plateau, stealing many of its resources, including livestock. It is estimated that around 2,700 animals, or almost a quarter of the livestock in the region comprising the Villard-de-Lans canton and the Vercors-Drôme, disappeared at that time. These animals were either slaughtered to feed the occupying troops, or exported to Germany to be bred as purebreds or crossbred with local breeds. In addition to losses directly linked to German kidnappings, farmers were forced to reduce their herds as their stocks and crops were destroyed. At the end of the war, the government tried to compensate for the losses by introducing new animals, notably French Simmentals, but these were little appreciated by local breeders and thus rejected.

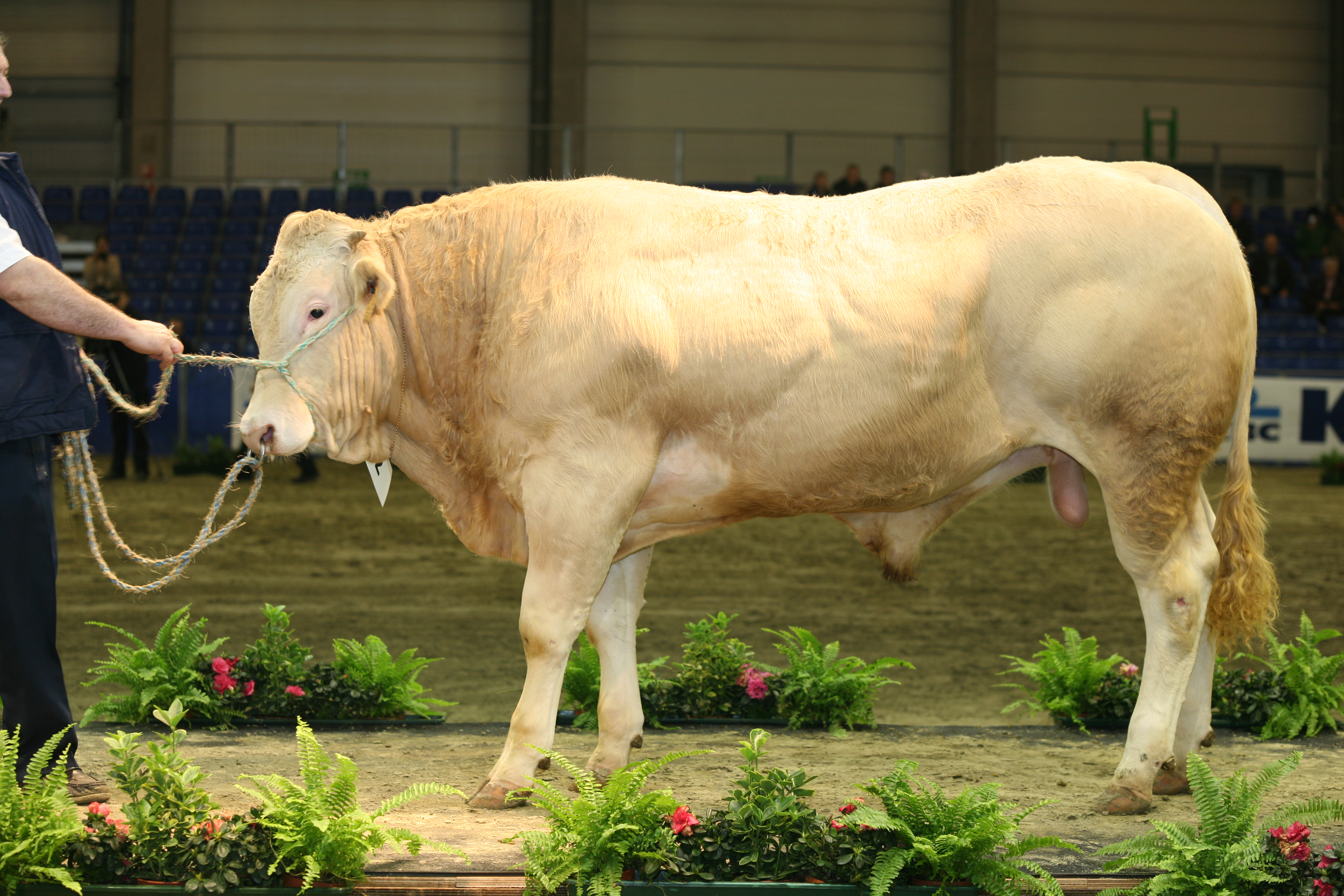
Blonde d'Aquitaine breed. An abandoned crossbreed.

Although this marked the beginning of the breed's decline, losses during World War II were not the only reason for the drop in numbers. Agricultural mechanization also played a major role in the decline. The arrival of horses between the end of the war and the 1950s initially removed the villarde's function as a plough animal, but without threatening it. But the arrival of tractors in the 1960s posed a new problem. To justify their purchase, farms had to improve their productivity. As a result, farms began to expand and specialize in dairy production, often opting for the Montbéliarde breed, which is more productive than the Villard-de-Lans.

Ultimately, the decline of this breed, although well suited to both meat and milk production, was linked to the specialization of cattle breeds in the 1960s. Villard-de-Lans, which did not yet have a breed registry and had neither specialized in meat nor milk production, was no longer of interest to the authorities of the time, who preferred to concentrate their efforts on a few other high-performance breeds. As a result, this breed no longer received any subsidies, and its bulls were no longer approved for artificial insemination, leading to its rapid decline. Despite the resistance of a few passionate breeders, the region gradually saw the arrival of highly productive Montbeliarde animals, which sealed the fate of the local breed. By 1968, there were just 1,000 Villard-de-Lans cows left.

To preserve the breed, a group of stockbreeders decided in 1967 to include the Villard-de-Lans in the Blonde d'Aquitaine breed registry. This breed is in fact quite close to the villarde in terms of its phenotype, and actually also originated from the combination of various breeds from south-west France: the blonde du Quercy, the garonnaise and the blonde des Pyrénées. The Villard-de-Lans would then have contributed its dairy performance to this specialized butcher's breed. However, the first crossbreeding campaign suggests a gradual integration of the villarde into the blonde d'Aquitaine, rather than a contribution to the creation of the new breed. These crosses marked a further stage in the breed's decay, and were eventually discontinued.

=== Protection ===
The 1966 law on livestock breeding mentions for the first time the importance of protecting and safeguarding local animal breeds. Thanks to this more advantageous context, public authorities once again took an interest in the breed in 1976, at a time when its situation was critical and there were only around 50 animals left. The Institut Technique de l'Elevage Bovin (I.T.E.B), now the Institut de l'Elevage, took a census of Villard-de-Lans cattle in April of that year, before setting up a conservation program to try and save it.

A breed registry was created in 1978. However, despite the introduction of a conservation program, herd numbers stagnated in the 1980s, standing at just 136 mother cows in 1990. This was in fact a transitional period, during which the herd was getting younger and some older breeders were going out of business. From the 1990s onwards, efforts began to bear fruit, with 286 cows in 2000 and 358 in 2006. A core group of livestock breeders has preserved the variety, and its revival is sought through the AOC Bleu du Vercors-Sassenage cheese, which has listed it among the breeds suitable for its production. After the 1980s, when numbers fluctuated around the one hundred mark, they reached 800 livestock in 2004, including 202 registered cows and 80 registered bulls. Around 80% of the females produce purebred cattle.

== Morphology ==
When the breed was first mentioned in 1832, it was described as "a strongly built cow, a good milker, of very advantageous size, also very good for ploughing, with a well-shaped body, spacious abdomen, well-developed pelvis, very voluminous udder and very ample dewlap". When the breed was made official in 1864, the commission of farmers charged with assessing the potential of the newly created breed drew up a more detailed description, which was subsequently refined on several occasions. Here is the 1914 version, published for the breed's special competition:

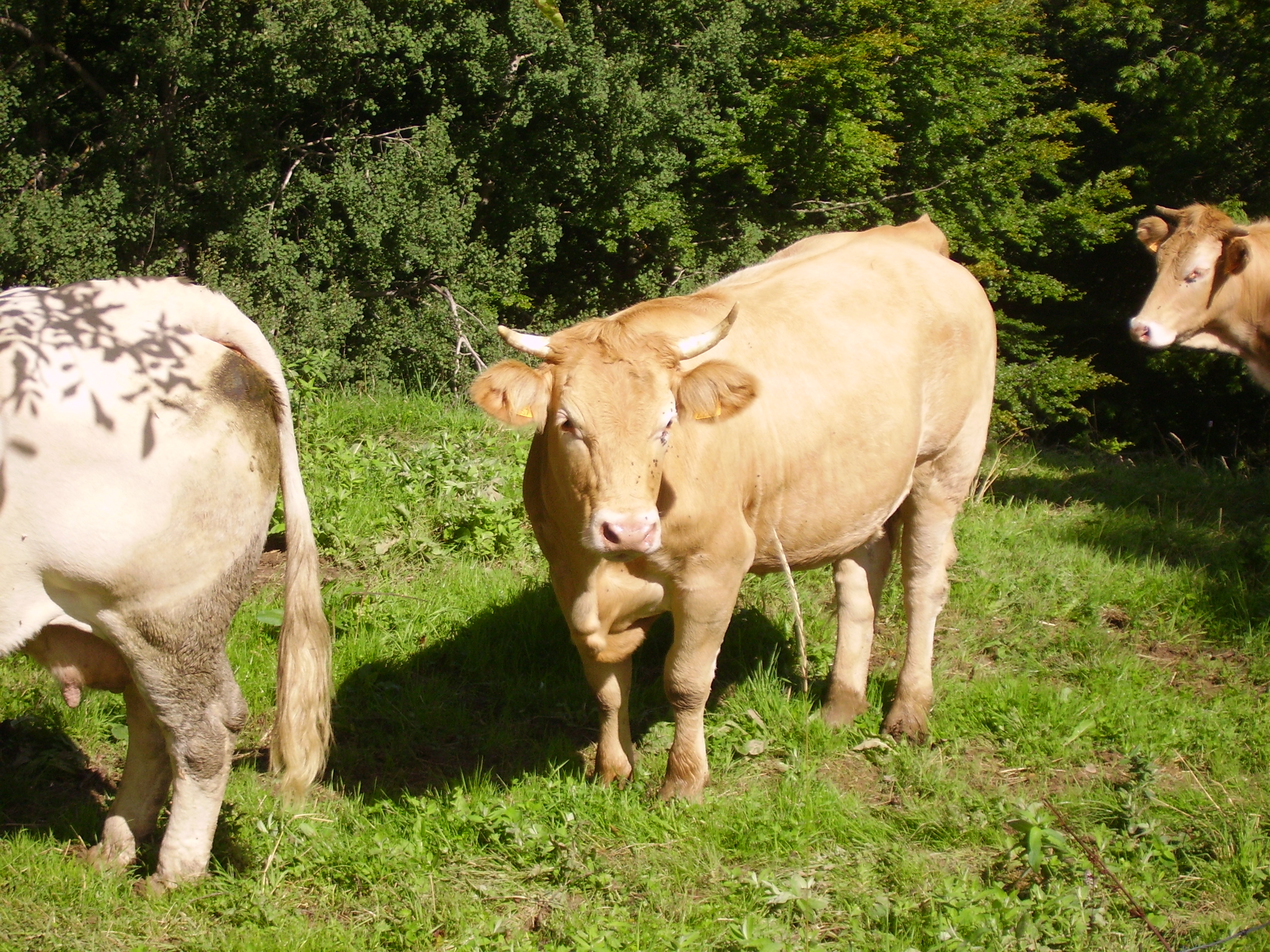
Villard-de-lans cows.

- "Uniformly wheat-colored coat of medium shade, free of white and black hairs;
- Mucous membranes of nose, mouth, anus, and vulva fully pink and without black markings;
- Well placed, fairly fine horns, whitish across their entire length, slightly upturned and a little darker towards the tip, pointing laterally;
- Well-developed toupet;
- Flat or slightly recessed forehead;
- Straight nasal bridge, more pronounced than curved;
- Long, loose mane;
- Slightly flat ribs;
- Moderately broad, horizontal back;
- Large loins;
- Lowered rear, not very prominent;
- Somewhat protruding tail attachment;
- Strong, healthy limbs, rather long than short;
- Good stance;
- Strong bones;
- Supple skin;
- Moderate dairy markings and a double-edged, curve-lined, rather flandrine escutcheon;
- Fairly large, above-average size."

Program for the Villard-de-Lans special breed competition, Grenoble, 1914.

== Aptitudes ==
Villard-de-Lans is characterized above all by its hardiness. It is a breed that is well adapted to the Vercors Massif, its traditional environment, and is not very susceptible to diseases.

=== Triple aptitude ===
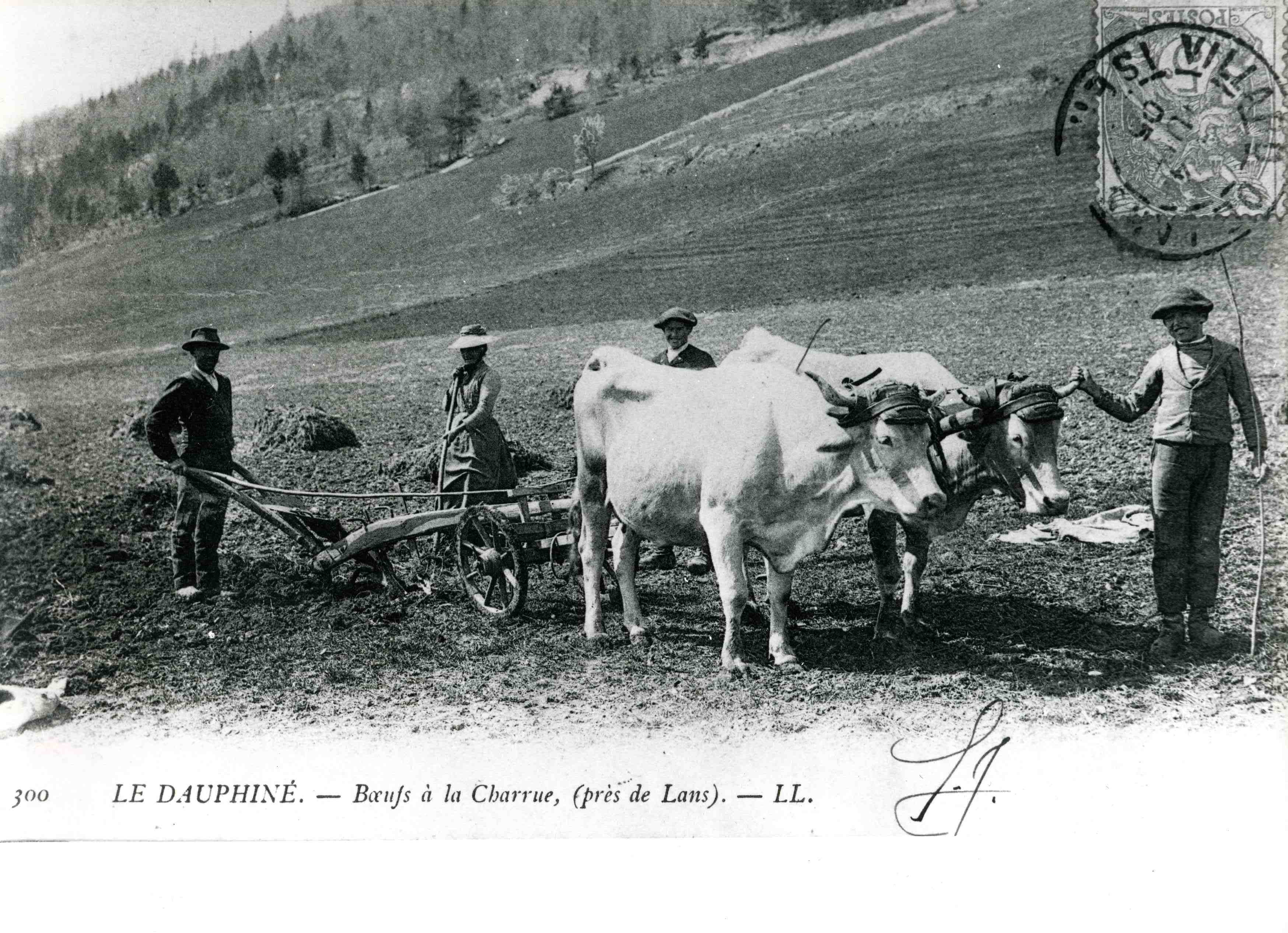
Oxen, presumably from Villard-de-Lans, in action. 1905.

The Villard-de-Lans was once a breed with a triple purpose, producing milk, meat and ploughing. Today, it is used for milk production or as a lactating cow. In the 19th century, cattle were the only means of animal traction used in the Villard-de-Lans canton. Cows were used exclusively, to work in the fields and help with logging operations such as skidding, without milking or reproduction being compromised. The heifers were prepared for these tasks at a very early age, while the males were sold on the surrounding plains, where they were much sought after for field work before being fattened up at around 4 or 5 years of age. The arrival of horses on the plateau in the 1930s was not enough to dethrone the cow as a traction tool. It was only the arrival of tractors in the 1950s that sparked its demise.

The Villard-de-Lans breed is also selected for its butchery qualities, and thus its milk production is rather limited. In 1864, milk production was estimated at 1,500 liters per lactation. By the 1920s, a study of 24 animals revealed an average production of 1,800 liters of milk, but with five animals exceeding 3,000 liters. The ability of certain villard families to produce milk in interesting quantities led some breeders to raise them solely for their milk. They sold the milk to the dairy farms that settled on the plateau at the beginning of the 20th century, and the fat-rich milk was used to make butter and cheese. Laffond advocated selecting the breed on its dairy performance and turning it into a fully-fledged dairy breed, but farmers rarely followed his advice. It has a production of around 4,000 liters of milk per lactation. With an average butyric content of 41 g/l and an average protein content of 32 g/l, this breed is well suited to cheese-making.

In 1864, the Villard-de-Lans attracted public interest primarily for its meat production. This breed had a higher meat yield than other common breeds in the region, such as the Fribourgeoise, Schwitz and Tarentaise (55% to 56% versus an average of 53% for these latter breeds), and was easier to fatten. Thanks to selection based on these butchery qualities, its meat carcass rates were further improved, and in 1929 yield rates of 60% to 64% were attributed to steers, 57% to 60% to heifers and 52% to 54% to cull cows. Its meat is also highly appreciated and sought after by butchers in the region, as its muscle fibers are reputed to be fine.

=== Milk production ===
Nowadays, the breed specializes in milk production, to distinguish itself from the Blonde d'Aquitaine, to whom it was almost merged. Average production per cow is estimated at 2,500 liters of milk, which remains low. However, there is considerable heterogeneity between each individual animal, with one cow achieving a production of 7,000 liters in one lactation. Moreover, because control mechanisms are weak, these results are somewhat biased. The milk is quite rich, with 41 g/l butter content and 32 g/l protein content, and is therefore well suited to cheese-making. The Villard-de-Lans is also one of the breeds accepted by the specifications for producing the AOC Bleu du Vercors-Sassenage.

=== Meat value ===
Villard-de-Lans milk-fed calves are renowned for their excellent taste. The animals have a respectable growth rate: they weigh around 161 kg at 120 days and 232 kg at 210 days, compared with 178 kg and 292 kg respectively of Charolais cattle. Villard-de-Lans meat is renowned for its finesse and flavor. In addition, the breed has a very good carcass yield (between 60 and 65% for cull animals).

== Selection and conservation policy ==
=== 19th century breed's improvement ===
Following the discovery of the breed in 1832, the Conseil Général de l'Isère quickly became interested in the possibilities of improving it. At the time, cattle breeds were mainly improved by crossing with other breeds. For this reason, the Conseil Général decided to subsidize the import of Salers cattle and Swiss bulls. The latter were quickly abandoned, as farmers considered them to be too demanding in terms of feeding. These import campaigns, which lasted 20 years, were not a real success in the Villard-de-Lans region, where only 2 bulls were introduced. In addition, the results of these crosses were often criticized.

Given the inefficiency of the crossbreeding policy, the breed turned to purebred selection in the second half of the 19th century. The officialization of the breed in 1864 marked this desire to work on the breed as it was, to improve it. To create synergy in the agricultural world, an annual competition was created for the breed, with the winner receiving 2,000 F from the Isère General Council and 1,000 F from the French State. However, the breed made little progress and, in 1875, the administration decided to create a breeding station devoted entirely to improving the Villard-de-Lans and breeding methods in the region. The station proved itself capable of applying severe selection to the animals, helping to refine the breed standard.

=== Conservation programme ===
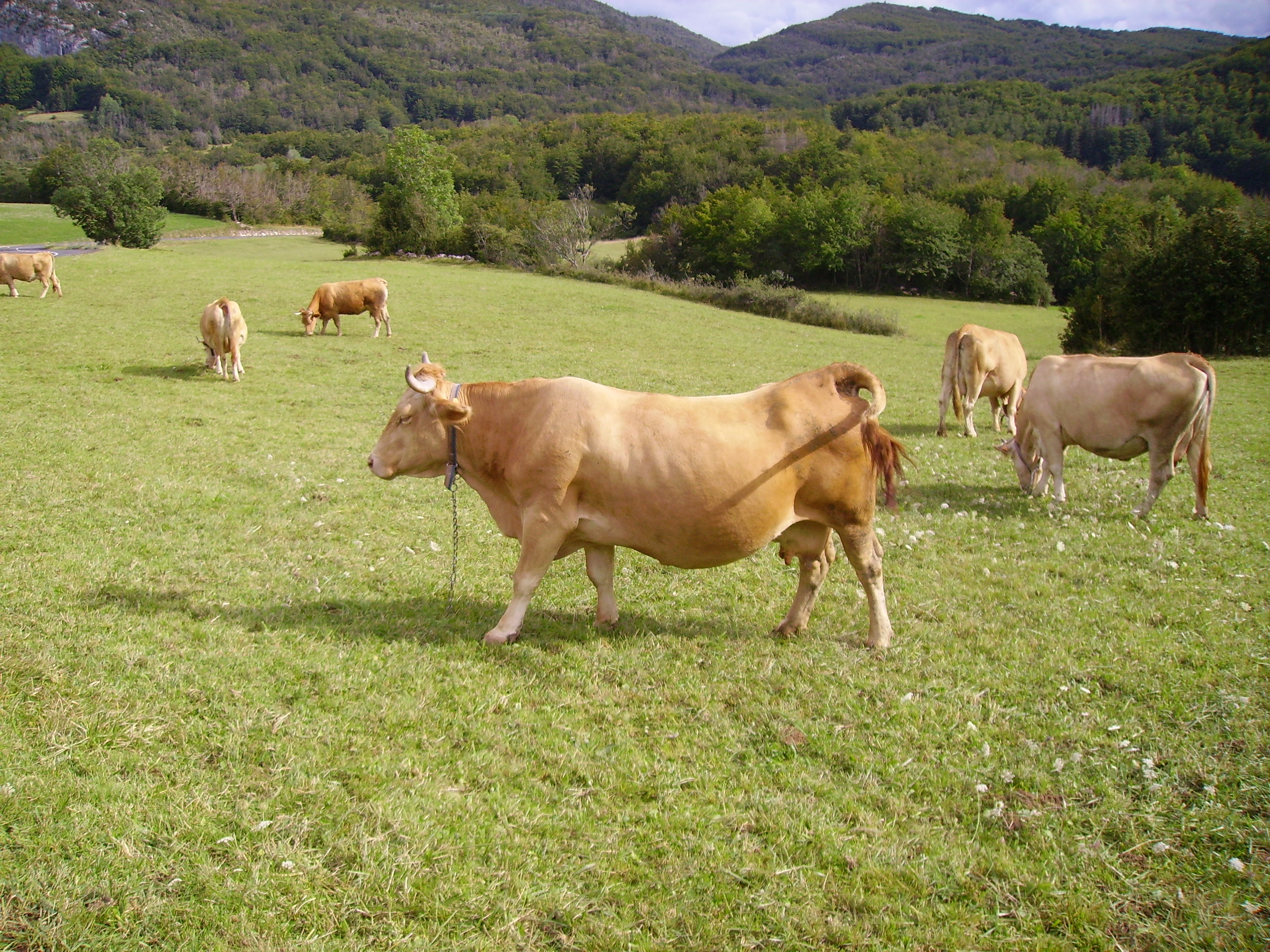
Herd of villardes in the Vercors massif.

Many local organizations are involved in the program, which was set up in 1976, including the UPRA Blonde d'Aquitaine, the Parc du Vercors, the Chambre d'agriculture de l'Isère and the Union des coopératives d’élevage et d’insémination de la région Alpes-Rhône (UCEAR), the Insémination artificielle du bassin grenoblois, the ITEB, l'EDE (Établissement départemental de l'élevage) de l'Isère and the Centre technique du génie rural des Eaux et Forêts (CTGREF). The main measures of this conservation plan are based on the collection and preservation of Villard-de-Lans bull semen by the insemination centers, and the maintenance of a breeding females base enabled by contracts signed with breeders. In return, the latter are relieved of the costs of artificial insemination and milk recording for these Villard-de-Lans cows under contract, and benefit from technical support in managing their mating plans and herds. The cost of these measures is covered by the State, which allocates 30,000 F to the program until 1983. It was then taken over at regional level by other bodies such as the Fond interministériel de développement et d'aménagement rural (FIDAR), which granted 38,000 F in 1983.

The first action of the breed conservation program was to take an inventory of the existing animals. They were mainly found in the Vercors massif by breeders who had been loyal to the breed for a long time, in the Grésivaudan massif where breeding with Charolais cattle was common, and in neighboring regions. It was decided not to impose a strict mating schedule on the breeders, so as not to discourage them from this time-consuming practice. Only the mating of bull mothers was organized. Another important action in the conservation program is the semen preservation of male cattle from the breed. In the beginning, the low number of males was a problem. It was difficult to make a real selection. This is why the different males taken at the beginning of the breed were put to reproduction with older cows, with well-known ancestry and sometimes from purebred herds, which made it possible to obtain animals conforming to the breed's standard. Villarde does not have its own breeding system, instead benefiting from a common system for thirteen breeds in conservation, grouping together the Armoricaine, Béarnaise, Bordelaise, Bretonne Pie Noir, Aure-et-saint-girons, Ferrandaise, Froment du Léon, Lourdaise, Maraîchine, Mirandaise, Nantaise, Saosnoise and Villard-de-Lans breeds. Its management is entrusted to the Institut de l'élevage, but its board is composed of stockbreeders of the aforementioned breeds. The first initiative of the breeding organization was to present these thirteen breeds at the Paris International Agricultural Show in 2010.

== Breeding ==
Most Villard-de-Lans breeders also keep animals of other breeds, and thus have a mixed herd. Only 25% of farms are purebred. It should also be noted that most breeders keep a limited number of animals, generally fewer than 5. Breeding systems are quite varied, although often traditional, with animals fed mainly on hay, and housed in stanchion barns. 20% of breeders milk their animals, while the others use them as a suckler breed. They often value their production through direct sales, especially if they are located in suburban areas.

== Geographical distribution ==
Vercors Massif. To the north, the "Quatre Montagnes" region.

Villard-de-Lans comes from a cattle population originally located in the "Quatre Montagnes" or "Montagnes de Lans" region, north of the Vercors Massif in the Isère department. This territory covers the communes of Villard-de-Lans, Lans-en-Vercors, Méaudre, Autrans and Corrençon-en-Vercors.

When the breed took off at the end of the 19th century, it spread to adjacent regions, thanks in particular to the development of means of transport. It gradually spread to the Grenoble region, to the banks of the Bièvre in the valleys of Saint-Geoire-en-Valdaine and Pont-de-Beauvoisin, and to the plains of Lyon and sub-Vienna. Between the two world wars, the breed moved into the Vercors-Drôme region and spread to the Valence and Romans-sur-Isère areas, as well as parts of the Ardèche and Loire regions, where it was sought after as a draught animal. It was even exported further afield, to Bresse to help improve local livestock, or to the Tarn and Haute-Garonne regions, but there was no real long-term follow-up.

Today, only 50 Villardes can be found in the "Quatre Montagnes" region, representing around 15% of the original herd. Villardes are mainly scattered in the Rhône-Alpes region, which accounts for 86% of the total, mainly in Isère (60% of the animals) and Drôme. There are also 22 Villard-de-Lans cows on a farm in Germany.

== In popular culture ==
The preservation of the Villard-de-Lans has been possible thanks to a few passionate breeders who have managed to preserve a few cows of this emblematic breed from the Villard-de-Lans region over the years. Today, the Villard-de-Lans is an emblematic cow of the Vercors Regional Park and is also associated with Bleu du Vercors-Sassenage, a cheese promoted to AOC status.

=== Statue ===
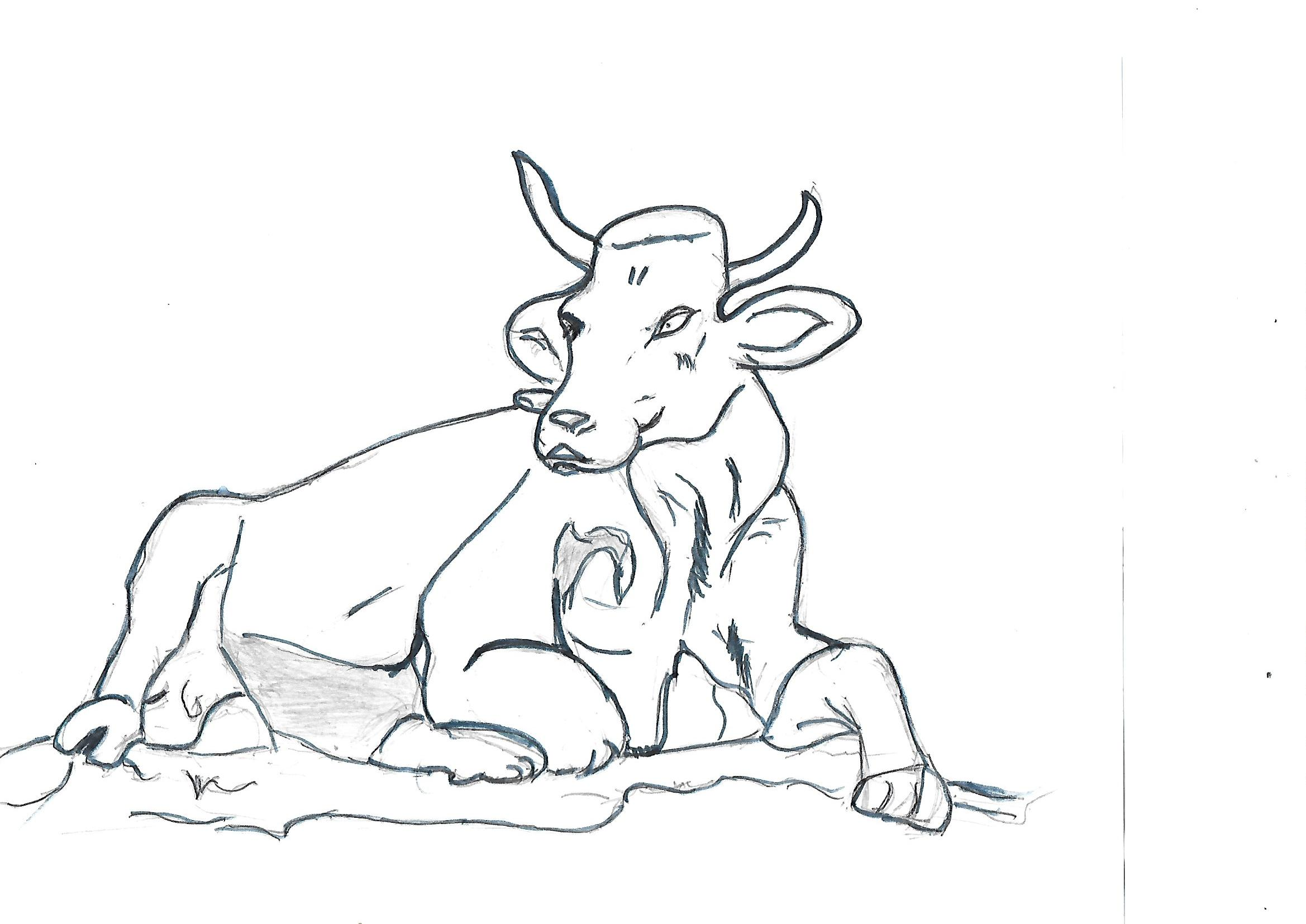
Drawing of "Sysimbre", based on the statue in Villard-de-Lans.

In January 2015, all the members of the Villard-de-Lans town council presided over by its mayor, Chantal Carlioz, asked sculptor Serge Lombard, to create a statutory set in honor of the "Villarde" to be installed on the Bréduire traffic circle at the entrance to Villard-de-Lans, from the road to Choranche and the Gorges de la Bourne.

The main subject, named "Sisymbre" was installed on this square on August 3, 2015, a calf was added a few days later. Her name was "Flavie". Both sculptures were made from "local stone", Vercors Urgonian Limestone, brought down from the mountains high above Villard-de-Lans and dating from the end of the Ice Age.

=== Philately ===
A postage stamp celebrating and depicting Villard-de-Lans was issued on February 22, 2014, by La Poste, the French postal services operator on the occasion of the Paris Agricultural Show. It went on general sale on March 3, 2014. The face value of this stamp on the date of issue was €0.61, corresponding to the national lettre verte tariff for a maximum weight of 20g.

Printed in rotogravure, 3,500,000 copies were issued by the postal administration.

The stamp, designed by artist Mathilde Laurent, was officially celebrated on March 7, 2014, in the center of Villard-de-Lans, attended by the town council, the Association pour la Réhabilitation et la Relance de la Race Bovine Villard-de-Lans (Association for the Rehabilitation and Revival of the Villard-de-Lans Cattle Breed) and the Association Philatélique du Plateau (Plateau Philatelic Association). It is part of the philatelic collection entitled "les vaches de nos régions".

== Appendix ==
=== See also ===
- List of French cattle breeds
- Bos taurus
- Pastoral farming
- List of cattle breeds
- History of French cattle breeding

=== Bibliography ===
- Denis Chevallier (publishing director), Le Temps des villardes : Une race bovine de montagne, Lyon, La Manufacture, coll. « L'Homme et la nature » (n^{o} 5), 1986, 86 p., in 8 ISBN 978-2-904638-76-3>
- Valérie Fouvez, ? (jury chairman), Sylvie Chastant-Maillard (dir. and jury member) et Jean-François Courreau (assessor and jury member), La race bovine Villard-de-Lans : Évolution historique (Thesis for veterinary doctorate), École nationale vétérinaire d'Alfort, 2008, (127 views) 120 (read onlinearchive)

=== External links ===
- Association pour la promotion des agriculteurs du parc naturel régional du Vercors, "La villarde: Une vache pas comme les autres!" archive, on Parc naturel régional du Vercors (accessed November 28, 2015)
