= Armoricaine =

French breed of cattle

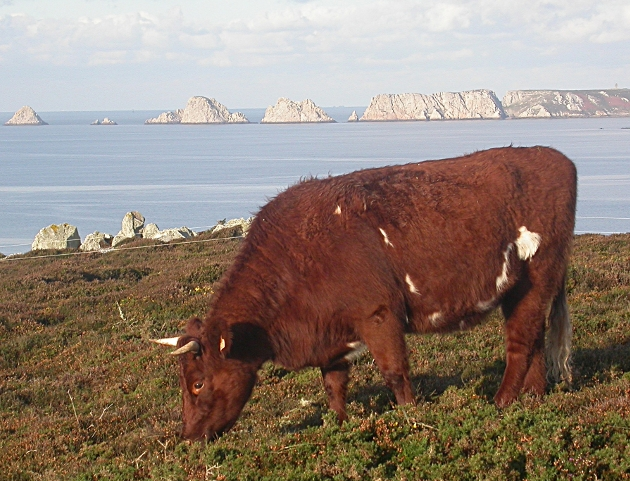

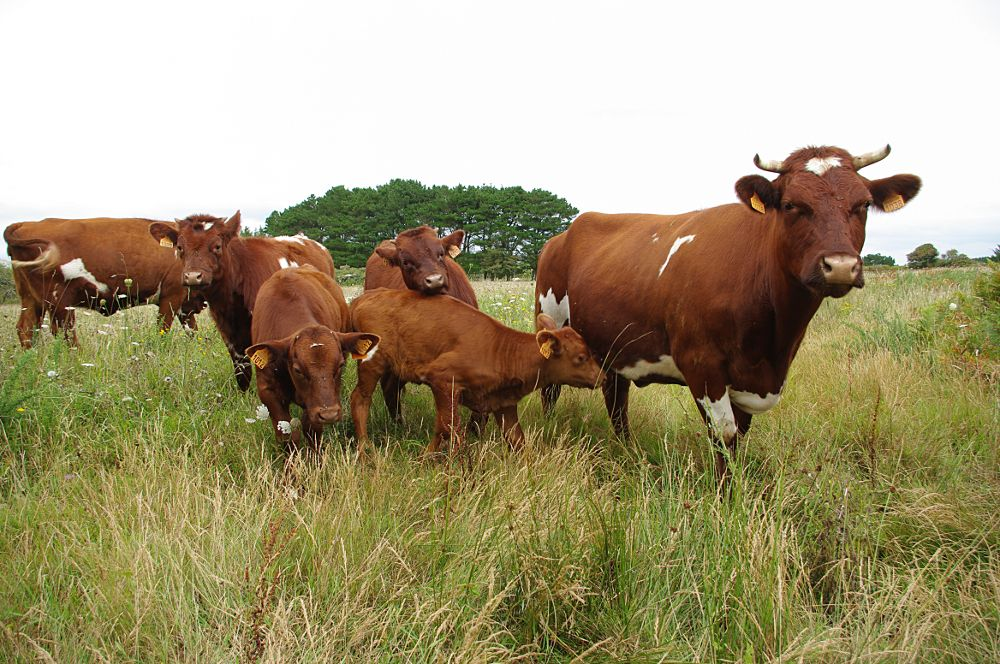
- Cows and calves
- Conservation status: FAO (2007): critical; DAD-IS (2025): at risk/endangered-maintained
- Other names: Armorican
- Country of origin: France
- Distribution: Brittany
- Use: dual-purpose, meat and milk

Traits
- Weight: Male: 800–1000 kg; Female: 600–700 kg
- Height: 130–140 cm; Female: 138 cm
- Skin colour: pale
- Coat: red with some white markings
- Horn status: horned in both sexes
- Cattle; Bos (primigenius) taurus

The Armoricaine or Armorican is an endangered French breed of domestic cattle. It originated in Brittany in the nineteenth century. It has a red coat with white markings, and has short horns.

== History ==
The Armoricaine was created in the nineteenth century by cross-breeding animals of the local Froment du Léon and the now-extinct Pie Rouge de Carhaix breeds with imported Durham (now known as Shorthorn) stock from the United Kingdom. A herd-book was started in 1919, and the Armoricaine breed name came into use in 1923.

The Armoricaine was used, with Meuse-Rhine-Issel and Rotbunt stock, in the creation of the Pie Rouge des Plaines breed of dairy cattle in the 1960s. In the later twentieth century it became rare; by 1978 there were no more than forty cows remaining. Following the discovery of a reserve of frozen semen in the 1980s, a programme of recovery was launched. In 2001 there were 61 cows registered, and 10 bulls; semen from 18 bulls was preserved and available for artificial insemination.

The breed was listed by the FAO as "critically endangered" in 2007. The population was estimated in 2005 to be in the range 230–248 head, and in 2020 was reported as 301 cows on 81 farms. The population reported for 2023 was 1799 head in 82 farms; this included 597 breeding cows and 50 active bulls. The conservation status of the breed in 2025 was "at risk/endangered-maintained".

== Characteristics ==
The coat is red, with some white markings. The horns are short. Cows weigh about 650 kg, and stand about 138 cm at the withers.

== Use ==
The Armoricaine is a dual-purpose breed, and may be raised both for meat and for milk. Cows produce some 4500 kg of milk in a lactation of about 305 days. The young grow quickly, and mature animals fatten fast.
