= Dutch Improved Red Pied =

Dutch breed of beef cattle

- Conservation status: FAO (2007): not at risk; DAD-IS (2022): endangered-maintained
- Other names: Dutch: Verbeterd Roodbont; Dutch: Verbeterd Roodbont Vleesras; Improved Red and White
- Country of origin: Netherlands
- Standard: Verbeterd Roodbont Vleesvee Stamboek
- Use: beef

Traits
- Height: Male: minimum 133 cm
- Cattle; Bos (primigenius) taurus

The Dutch Improved Red Pied, Dutch: Verbeterd Roodbont, is a recently-developed Dutch breed of beef cattle. It derives from the dual-purpose Meuse-Rhine-Issel breed, and is characterised by a high incidence of the double-muscling gene. A breed association was started in 1988.

== History ==
The Dutch Improved Red Pied derives from the Meuse-Rhine-Issel, a dual-purpose breed reared both for milk and for beef. The muscular hyperplasia known as double muscling was first observed in that breed in 1937, but because of the associated dystocia was regarded as undesirable or as a defect. With the greater availability of antibiotics in the years after the Second World War, it became possible to deliver calves by Caesarian section, and from the 1960s semen from double-muscled Meuse-Rhine-Issel bulls became available for artificial insemination. Selection of these animals for beef production alone led to the creation of the Verbeterd Roodbont, for which a breed association was started in 1988.

In the twenty-first century, a research project aimed to reduce the proportion of births requiring delivery by Caesarian section to less than half by 2020.

In 2006 there were about 8000 of the cattle in the hands of approximately 200 breeders, and in 2007 the conservation status of the breed was listed by the FAO as 'not at risk'. In 2019 the total number was reported to DAD-IS as 700–900, and the conservation status listed as 'at risk'/'endangered-maintained'.

== Characteristics ==
The cattle are red pied and of medium size. Increased size is one of the aims of selection in the breed; breeding bulls should reach a height at the withers of at least 133 cm by the age of three.
