= Bleu du Vercors-Sassenage =

French cheese

Bleu du Vercors-Sassenage (French pronunciation: [blø dy vɛʁkɔʁ sasənaʒ]) is a mild pasteurized natural rind cow's milk blue cheese originally produced by monks in the Rhône-Alpes region of France in the 14th century. It is named for the Vercors Massif and the town of Sassenage.

The cheese has been a protected Appellation d'Origine Contrôlée since 1998. As a requirement, the cheese must be composed of milk from Montbéliard, Abondance or Villard cows, and produced within an area within the Vercors Massif covering 13 towns in the Drôme département, and 14 from the département of Isère. Despite its name, the area of production does not include the town of Sassenage.

== Characteristics ==
Bleu du Vercors-Sassenage is a sweet and creamy semi-soft blue cheese. It is produced in wheels with a diameter of 27 to 30cm and a height of 7 to 9cm, weighing 4 to 4.5kg. The fat content is around 28%. The cheese is unpressed and uncooked and contains the mold Penicillium roqueforti. In Larousse's Grand Dictionnaire Universel of the 19th century, King Francis I is described as being quite fond of the cheese.

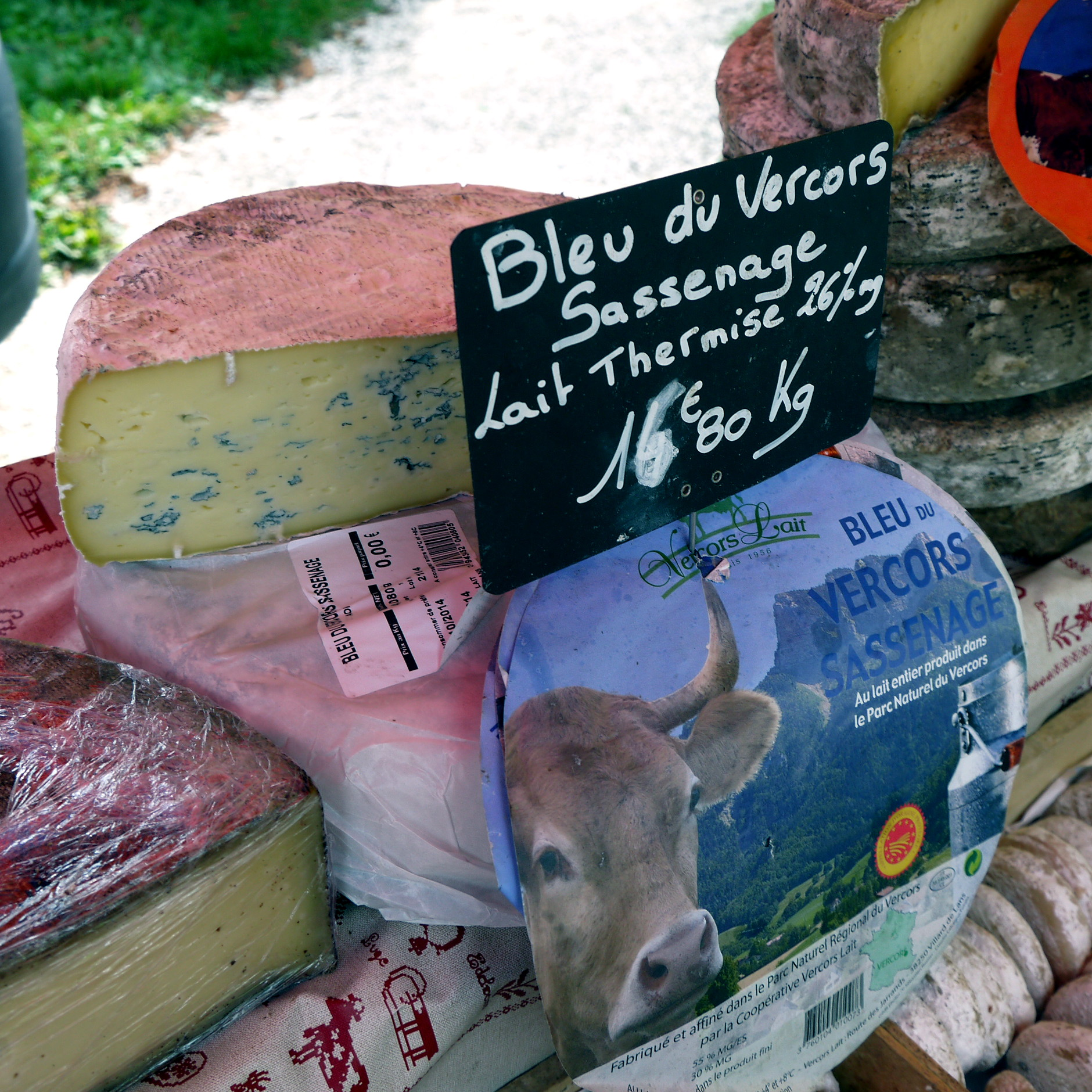

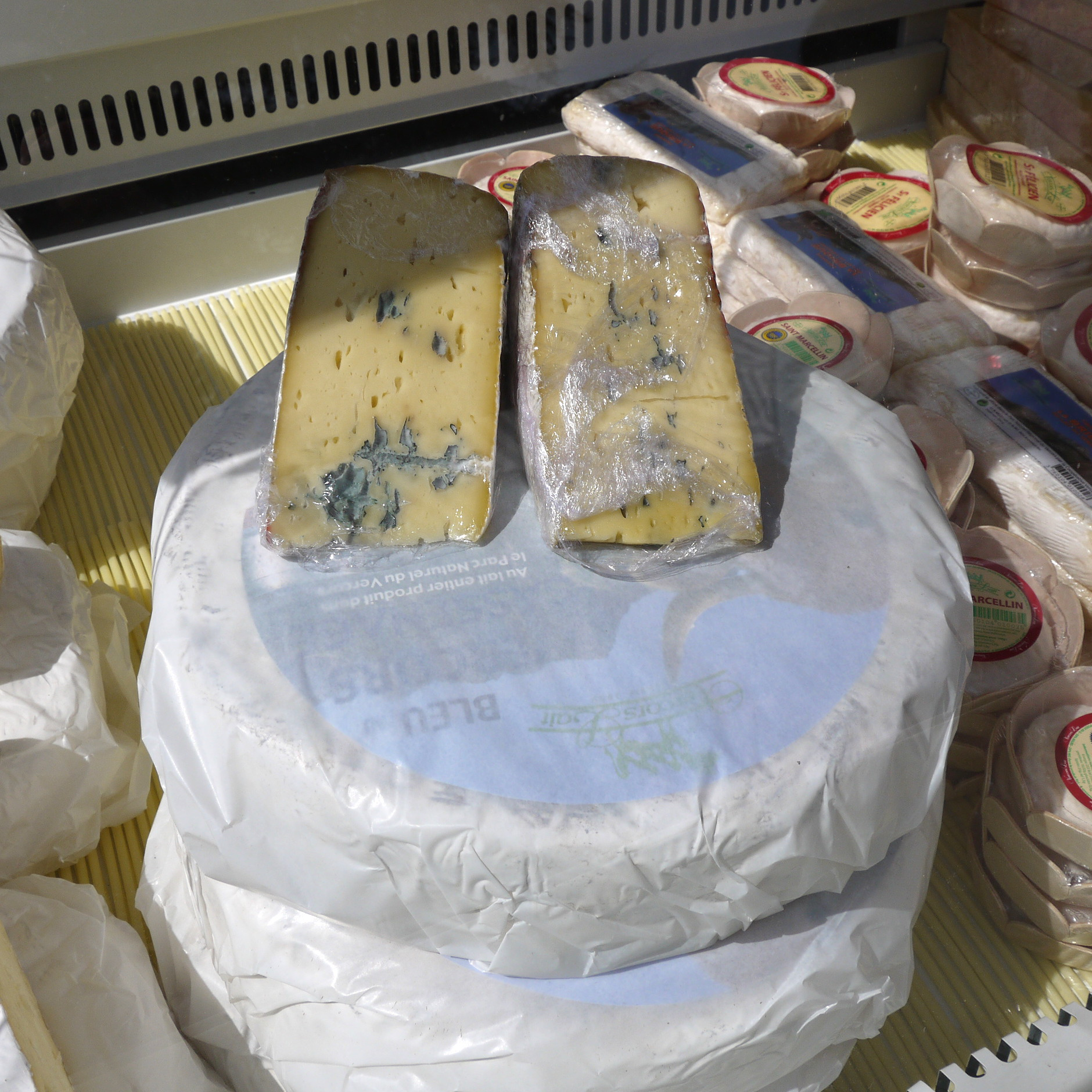

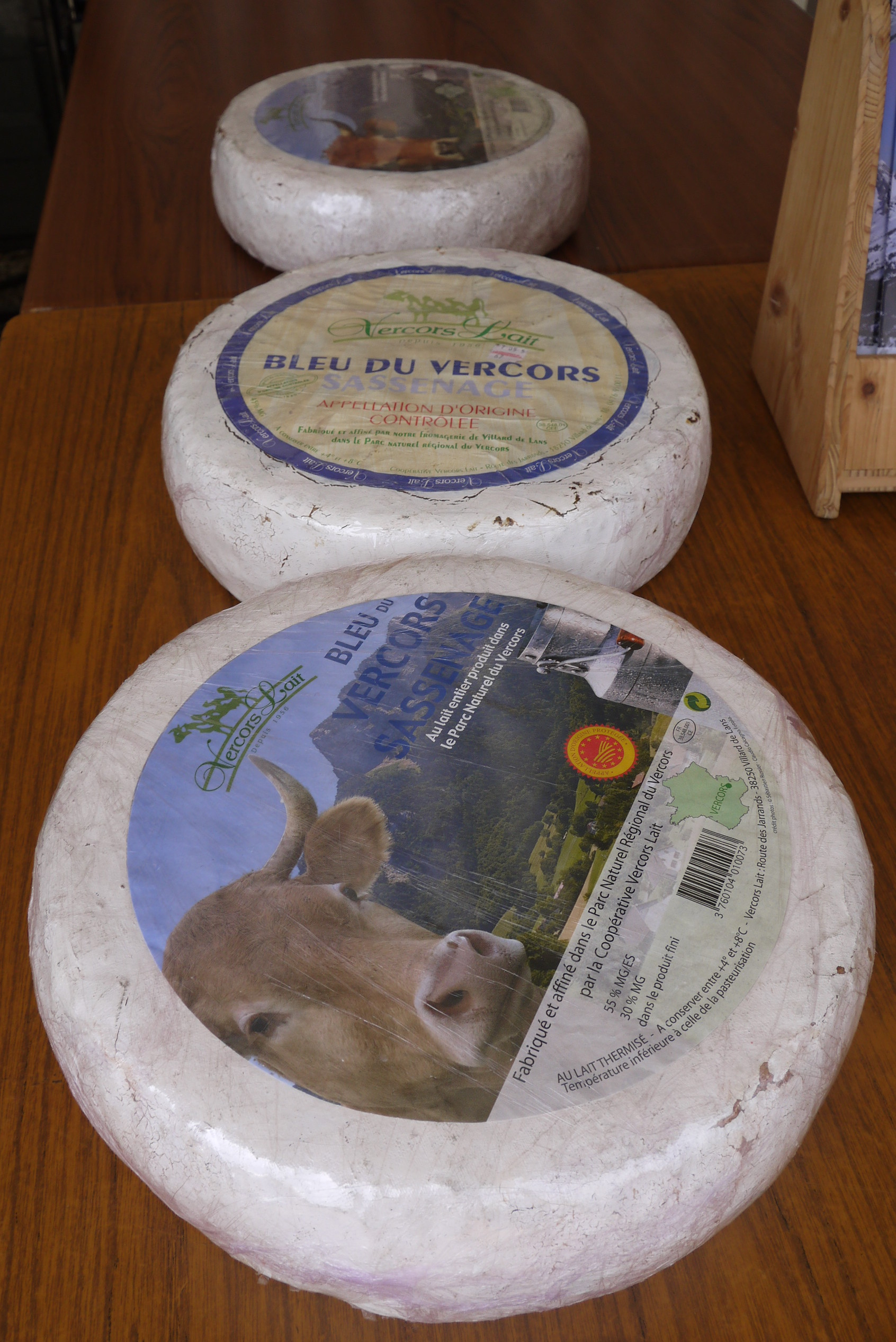

== See also ==
- List of cheeses
- Villard-de-Lans (cattle breed)
