= Deutsche Rotbunte =

German breed of cattle

The German Red Pied (German: Deutsche Rotbunte, Rotbuntes Niederungsvieh or Rotbuntes Niederungsrind) is a breed of cattle from Germany.

The development of the breed occurred in several regions in Germany during the 19th century, and in 1934 Meuse-Rhine-Issel blood was introduced. The females average 1.35 metres (4 ft 5 in) in height and weigh 700 kilograms (1,500 lb). Bulls average 1.45 metres (4 ft 9 in) and 1,000 kilograms (2,200 lb).
