= Villard-de-Lans =

- Commune
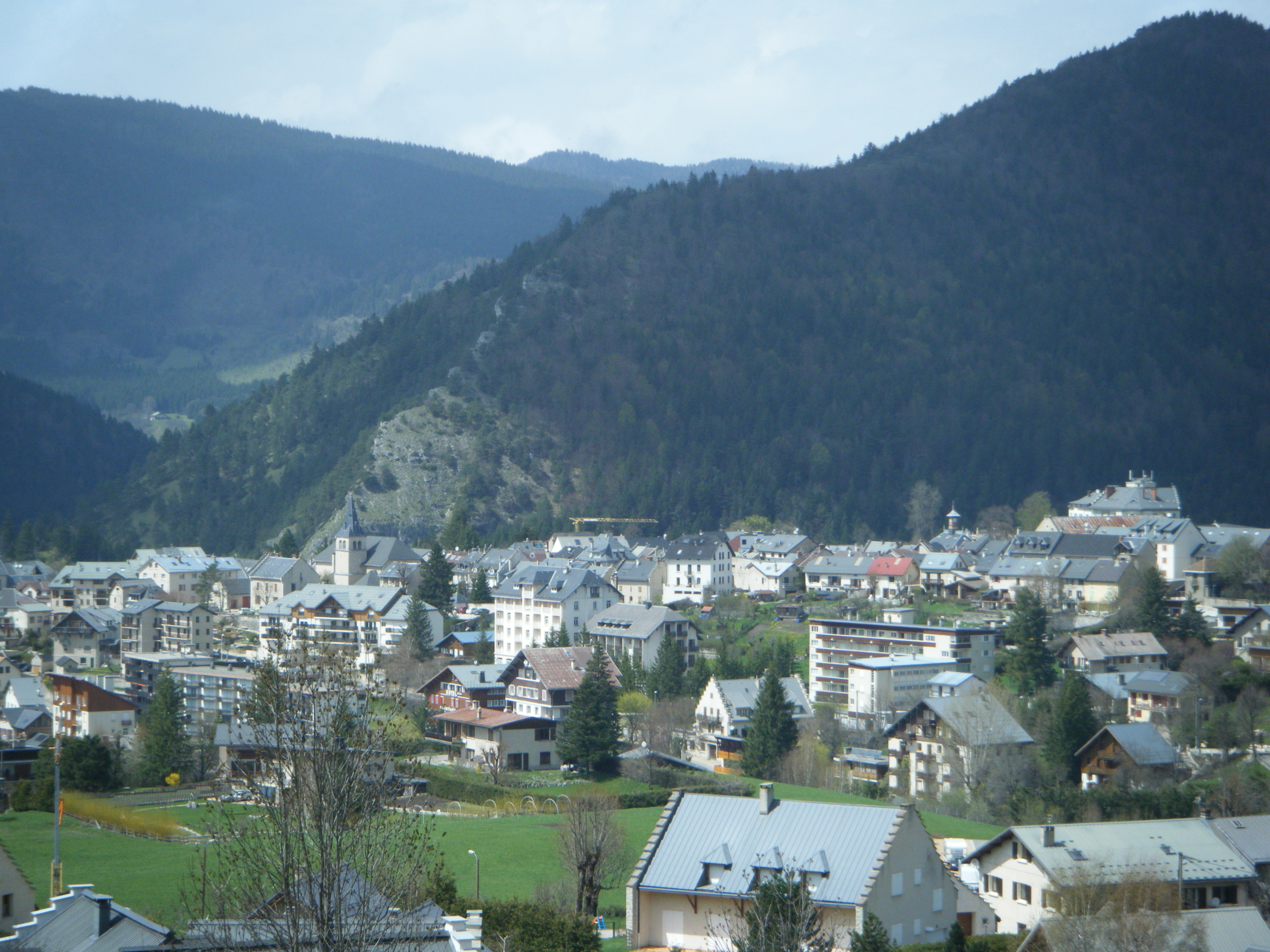
- A general view of Villard-de-Lans

- Coat of arms
- Location of Villard-de-Lans
- Location within France Location within Auvergne-Rhône-Alpes
- Coordinates: 45°04′15″N 5°33′05″E
- Country: France
- Region: Auvergne-Rhône-Alpes
- Department: Isère
- Arrondissement: Grenoble
- Canton: Fontaine-Vercors
- Intercommunality: Massif du Vercors

Government
  - Mayor (2020–2026): Arnaud Mathieu
- Area^{1}: 67.20 km^{2} (25.95 sq mi)
- Highest elevation: 2,286 m (7,500 ft)
- Lowest elevation: 720 m (2,360 ft)
- Population (2023): 4,328
  - Density: 64.40/km^{2} (166.8/sq mi)
- Time zone: UTC+01:00 (CET)
  - Summer (DST): UTC+02:00 (CEST)
- INSEE/Postal code: 38548 /38250
- ^{1} French Land Register data, which excludes lakes, ponds, glaciers > 1 km^{2} (0.386 sq mi or 247 acres) and river estuaries.

Villard-de-Lans (French pronunciation: [vilˈaʁ də lˈɑ̃s], literally Villard of Lans; Vivaro-Alpine: Lo Vilar de Lanç) is a commune in the Isère department of the Auvergne-Rhône-Alpes region in southeastern France. The town is also situated in the Vercors Massif. It was the administrative centre of the eponymous canton until the departmental elections of 2015. After the elections, Villard-de-Lans and the communes of its former canton were all incorporated into the new canton of Fontaine-Vercors. The town remains the seat of the Community of Communes in the Vercors Massif (CCMV).

The town is a centre for skiing in winter, as well as hiking and hot air ballooning during the other seasons. It is also the town with the largest amount of available lodging in the entire Vercors Regional Natural Park.

== Population ==
Historical population

Year	Pop.	±% p.a.
1793	2,058	—
1821	2,131	+0.12%
1846	2,500	+0.64%
1872	1,970	−0.91%
1901	1,801	−0.31%
1926	1,631	−0.40%
1946	3,990	+4.57%
1962	2,760	−2.28%
1968	3,085	+1.87%

Year	Pop.	±% p.a.
1975	3,258	+0.78%
1982	3,224	−0.15%
1990	3,346	+0.47%
1999	3,798	+1.42%
2007	4,023	+0.72%
2012	4,051	+0.14%
2017	4,210	+0.77%
2023	4,328	+0.46%

Source: EHESS and INSEE (1968-2023)

== History ==
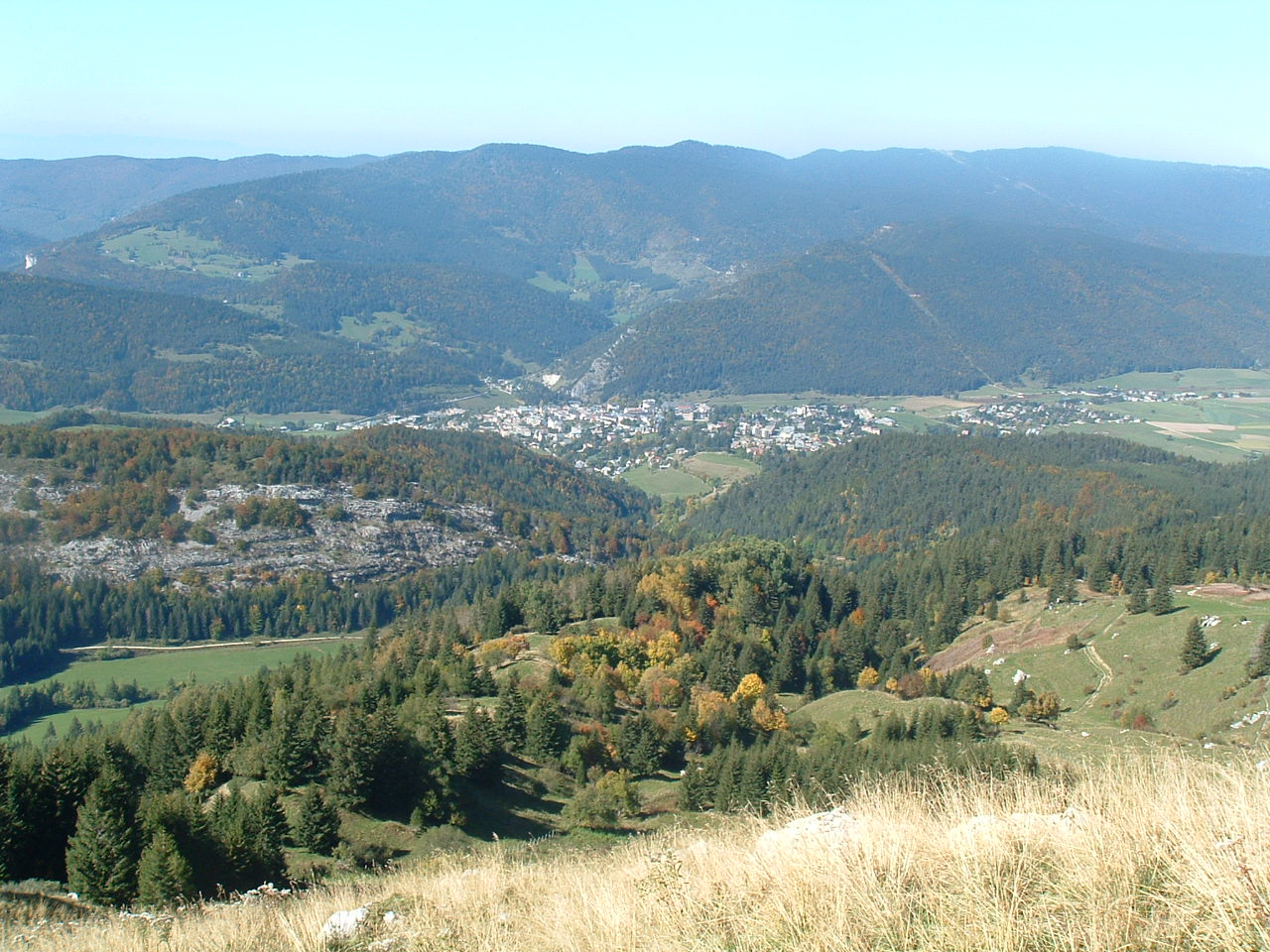
Villard from Clos du Four

Starting in 1906, the town of Villard-de-Lans was recognized as a ski resort. More facilities were built during the 1920s that allowed the town to host its first bobsled and luge competition in 1931.

For over a decade, the town was connected to the prefecture centre of Grenoble by a tram called the Tramway Grenoble - Villard-de-Lans. The tram, which also serviced the towns of Lans-en-Vercors and Saint-Nizier-du-Moucherotte, had completely seized operations by 1949.

=== World War II ===
During World War II, Villard-de-Lans was host to the only Polish high school in Occupied Europe. There is a plaque on the old building memorializing the names of the numerous students and teachers who were deported to camps by the occupying force during the war.

The region was home to several thousand Poles, people in hiding, military defectors and evaders, as well as members of the French Resistance. Due to these circumstances, and its proximity to Grenoble, the historically rural and mountainous commune of Villar-de-Lans became a refuge for the resistance against the German occupation and led to the formation of the Maquis du Vercors, a group of fighters that were part of the French Forces of the Interior.

After the war, Charles de Gaulle paid homage to the fighters of the Vercors by visiting Villard-de-Lans in 1948. During his visit, de Gaulle gave a speech in which he tried to discuss the controversy, which was still very strong at the time, vis-à-vis the attitude of Free France's leader and allies regarding the Maquis du Vercors.

=== 1968 Winter Olympics ===
During the 1968 Winter Olympics held in neighbouring Grenoble, Villard-de-Lans played host to the luge events. Costing FRF 3,190,000 to complete, the Olympic luge track was completed using 1,400 cubic metres (49,000 cubic feet) of earthwork and 1,800 cubic metres (64,000 cubic feet) of reinforced concrete. The facility had three start houses, 132 lighting posts, telephone circuitry, 40 loudspeakers, and a signalling system for the competitors.

Physical statistics
Sport	Length (meters)	Turns	Vertical drop (start to finish)	Average grade (%)
Luge - men's singles	1000	11	110	11

No turn names are given for the track. Data from the women's singles or men's doubles also not given.

== Tourism ==
=== Winter Sports ===
Villard-de-Lans has many options to participate in Winter Sports including:

- "Côte 2000" - ski resort with 50 runs and 18 lifts.
- "Site nordique du Haut Vercors" - Nordic skiing area
- "Luge and Ski-Parc de la Colline des Bains" - small hill which is used for young skiers just starting out, as well as for sledding.

== International relations ==
Villard-de-Lans is twinned with Mikołajki, Poland.

== See also ==
- Communes of the Isère department
- Parc naturel régional du Vercors
- Villard-de-Lans (cattle breed)
