= Meuse-Rhine-Issel =

Dutch breed of cattle

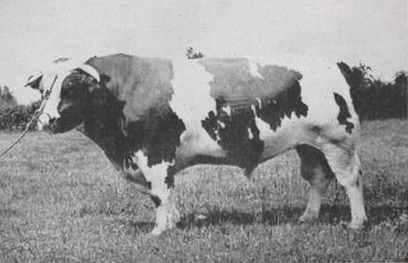
- Bull, photograph from circa 1938
- Conservation status: FAO (2007): not at risk; CGN (2020): declining; DAD-IS (2022): not at risk
- Other names: Meuse-Rhine-Yssel; Maas-Rijn-IJssel; Maas-Rijn-IJsselvee
- Country of origin: Netherlands
- Use: dairy

Traits
- Weight: Female: 700 kg
- Height: Male: 145 cm; Female: 137 cm
- Coat: red pied, often with little red
- Cattle; Bos (primigenius) taurus

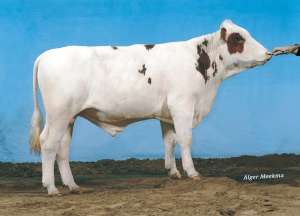
Breeding bull, 2007

The Meuse-Rhine-Issel or Meuse-Rhine-Yssel (Dutch: Maas-Rijn-IJssel) is a Dutch breed of dual-purpose cattle, reared both for meat and for milk. It falls within the Lowland-Pied group of North European cattle; it is red-pied, and of medium-large size.

== History ==
The Meuse-Rhine-Issel developed principally in two areas of Holland: the eastern part of the province of Noord-Brabant in the southern part of the country, where the rivers Meuse and Rhine flow; and the area of the river IJssel in the east, mainly in Salland and Twente in the province of Overijssel, but extending southwards into the Achterhoek of Gelderland and northwards into the province of Drenthe. It is named for the three rivers.

It was registered in the herd-book of the Nederlands Rundvee Syndicaat from 1874; it was recognised as a breed in 1905, and a separate herd-book was started.

Numbers are in steep decline: in the 1970s there were more than half a million of the cattle, representing approximately a quarter of the total number of dairy cattle in the Netherlands; numbers fell to 31000 in 1999 and to 14000 in 2004. In 2021 the total population reported to DAD-IS was 9938. Over 925000 doses of semen are kept in cryo-conservation; they represent almost 250 bulls, of which about one-fifth are from before 1980.

In the twentieth century the Meuse-Rhine-Issel was one of the five breeds approved for cross-breeding with the British Dairy Shorthorn, leading to the development of the Blended Red-and-White Shorthorn and the virtual disappearance of the traditional Shorthorn breed. The Dutch Improved Red Pied (Dutch: Verbeterd Roodbont Vleesras) is a modern meat breed derived from dual-purpose Meuse-Rhine-Issel stock. The Brandrood IJsellvee is a modern breed which preserves the old colouring of the Meuse-Rhine-Issel, dark red with little white.

== Characteristics ==
The Meuse-Rhine-Issel falls within the Lowland-Pied group of North European cattle; it is red-pied, and of medium-large size.
